= Morvilliers =

Morvilliers is the name of several communes in France:

- Morvilliers, Aube in the Aube department
- Morvilliers, Eure-et-Loir, in the Eure-et-Loir department
