= Les Ressuintes =

- Commune
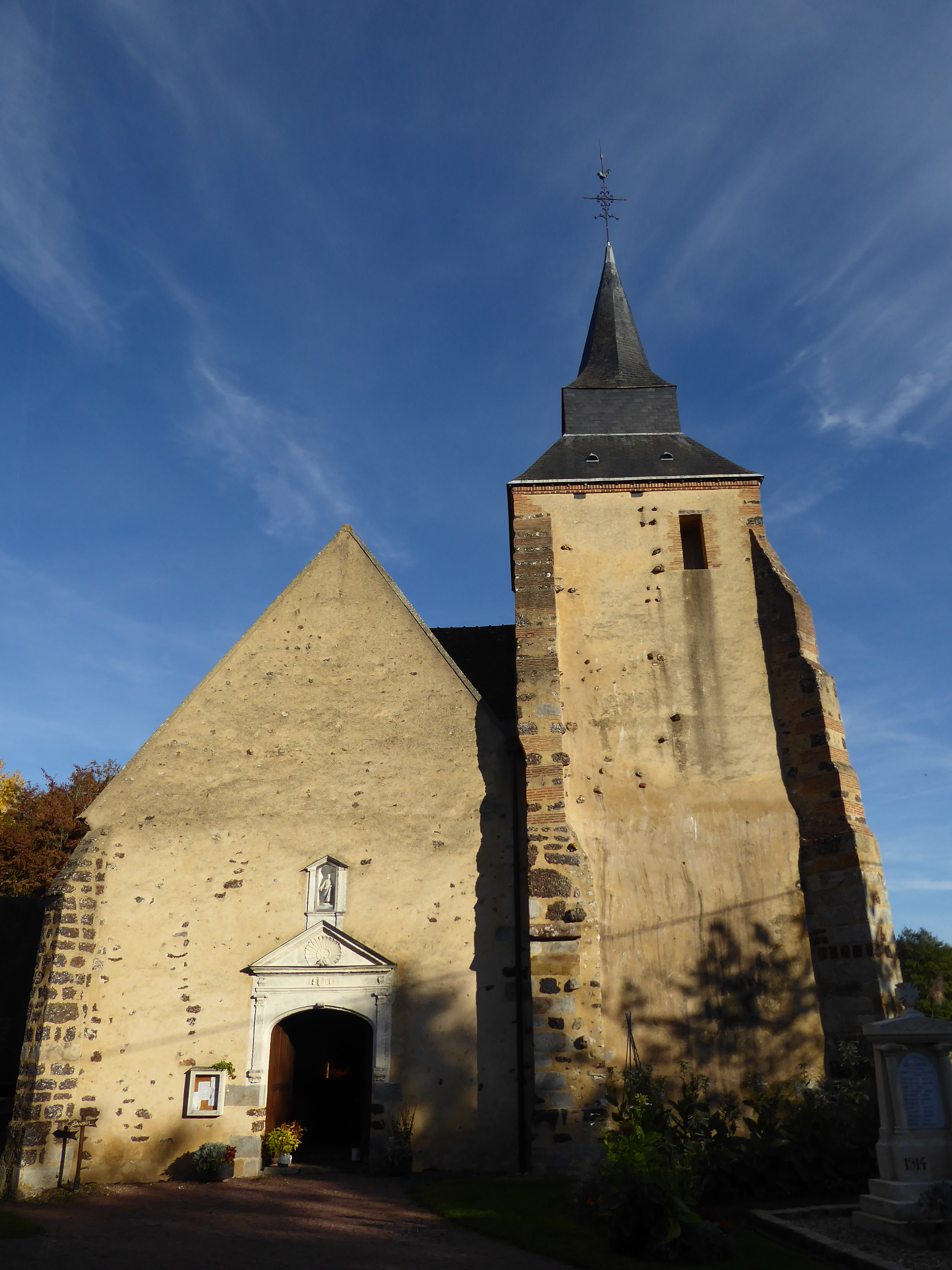
- The church in Les Ressuintes
- Location of Les Ressuintes
- Location within France Location within Centre-Val de Loire
- Coordinates: 48°36′21″N 0°56′19″E
- Country: France
- Region: Centre-Val de Loire
- Department: Eure-et-Loir
- Arrondissement: Dreux
- Canton: Saint-Lubin-des-Joncherets
- Intercommunality: Forêts du Perche

Government
  - Mayor (2020–2026): Kristell Chevreau
- Area^{1}: 7.46 km^{2} (2.88 sq mi)
- Elevation: 242 m (794 ft)
- Highest elevation: 281 m (922 ft)
- Lowest elevation: 224 m (735 ft)
- Population (2023): 152
  - Density: 20.4/km^{2} (52.8/sq mi)
- Time zone: UTC+01:00 (CET)
  - Summer (DST): UTC+02:00 (CEST)
- INSEE/Postal code: 28314 /28340
- ^{1} French Land Register data, which excludes lakes, ponds, glaciers > 1 km^{2} (0.386 sq mi or 247 acres) and river estuaries.

Les Ressuintes is a commune in the Eure-et-Loir department in northern France.

== Geography ==
The Commune along with another 70 communes shares part of a 47,681 hectare, Natura 2000 conservation area, called the Forêts et étangs du Perche.

== Population ==
Historical population
Year	Pop.	±% p.a.
1968	115	—
1975	100	−1.98%
1982	101	+0.14%
1990	79	−3.02%
1999	127	+5.42%
2007	149	+2.02%
2012	134	−2.10%
2017	122	−1.86%
2023	152	+3.73%
Source: INSEE

== See also ==
- Communes of the Eure-et-Loir department
