= Le Boullay-les-Deux-Églises =

- Commune
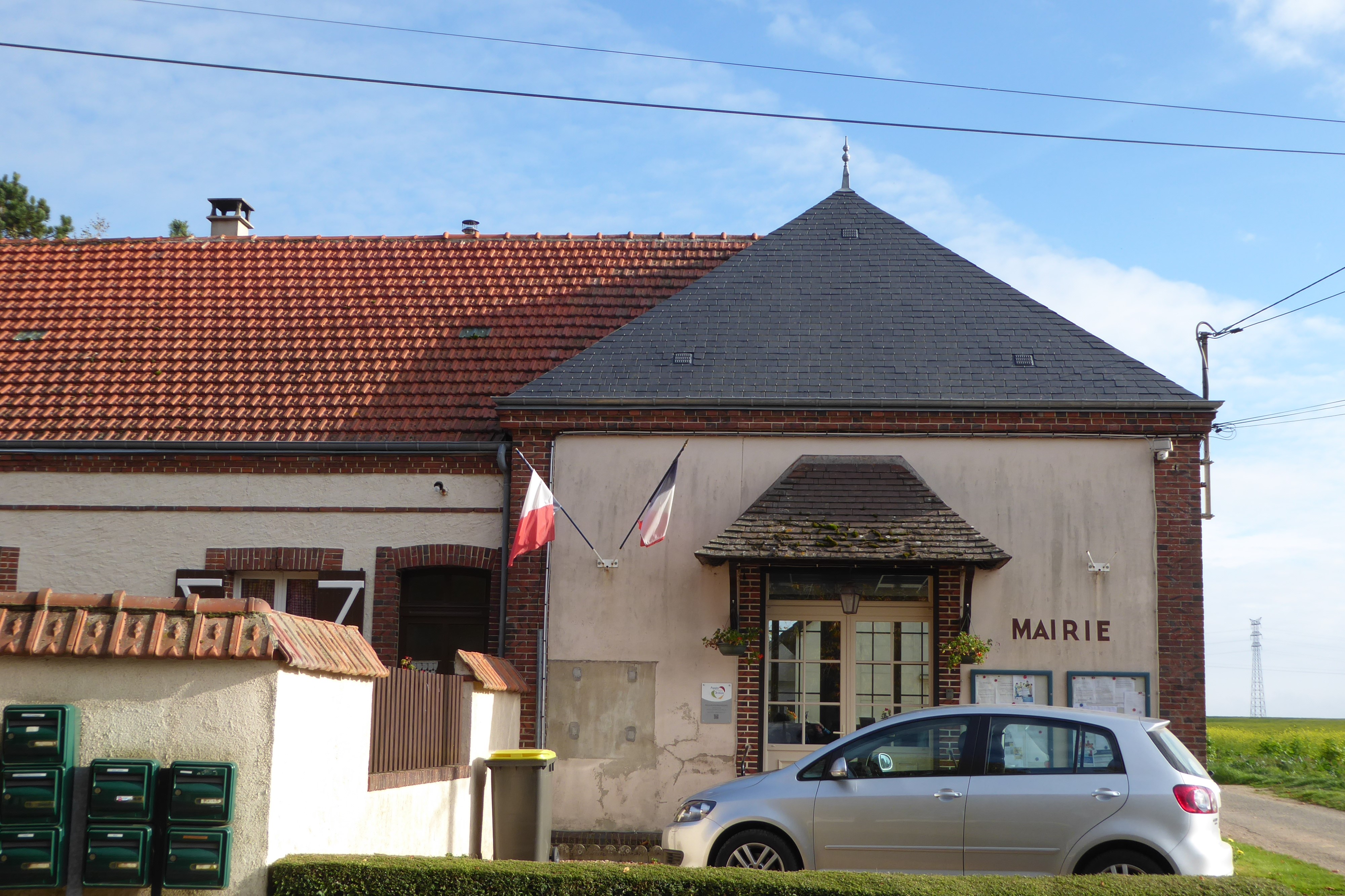
- The town hall in Le Boullay-les-Deux-Églises
- Location of Le Boullay-les-Deux-Églises
- Location within France Location within Centre-Val de Loire
- Coordinates: 48°37′39″N 1°19′48″E
- Country: France
- Region: Centre-Val de Loire
- Department: Eure-et-Loir
- Arrondissement: Dreux
- Canton: Saint-Lubin-des-Joncherets
- Intercommunality: CA Pays de Dreux

Government
  - Mayor (2020–2026): Béatrice Pierron
- Area^{1}: 13.82 km^{2} (5.34 sq mi)
- Elevation: 175 m (574 ft)
- Highest elevation: 188 m (617 ft)
- Lowest elevation: 127 m (417 ft)
- Population (2023): 242
  - Density: 17.5/km^{2} (45.4/sq mi)
- Time zone: UTC+01:00 (CET)
  - Summer (DST): UTC+02:00 (CEST)
- INSEE/Postal code: 28053 /28170
- ^{1} French Land Register data, which excludes lakes, ponds, glaciers > 1 km^{2} (0.386 sq mi or 247 acres) and river estuaries.

Le Boullay-les-Deux-Églises (French pronunciation: [lə bulɛ le dø.z‿eɡliz], literally Le Boullay the Two Churches) is a commune in the Eure-et-Loir department in northern France.

== Population ==
Historical population
| Year | Pop. | ±% p.a. |
|---|---|---|
| 1968 | 164 | — |
| 1975 | 150 | −1.27% |
| 1982 | 178 | +2.48% |
| 1990 | 187 | +0.62% |
| 1999 | 213 | +1.46% |
| 2007 | 231 | +1.02% |
| 2012 | 258 | +2.24% |
| 2017 | 261 | +0.23% |
| 2023 | 242 | −1.25% |
Source: INSEE

== See also ==
- Communes of the Eure-et-Loir department
