= Saint-Sauveur-Marville =

- Commune
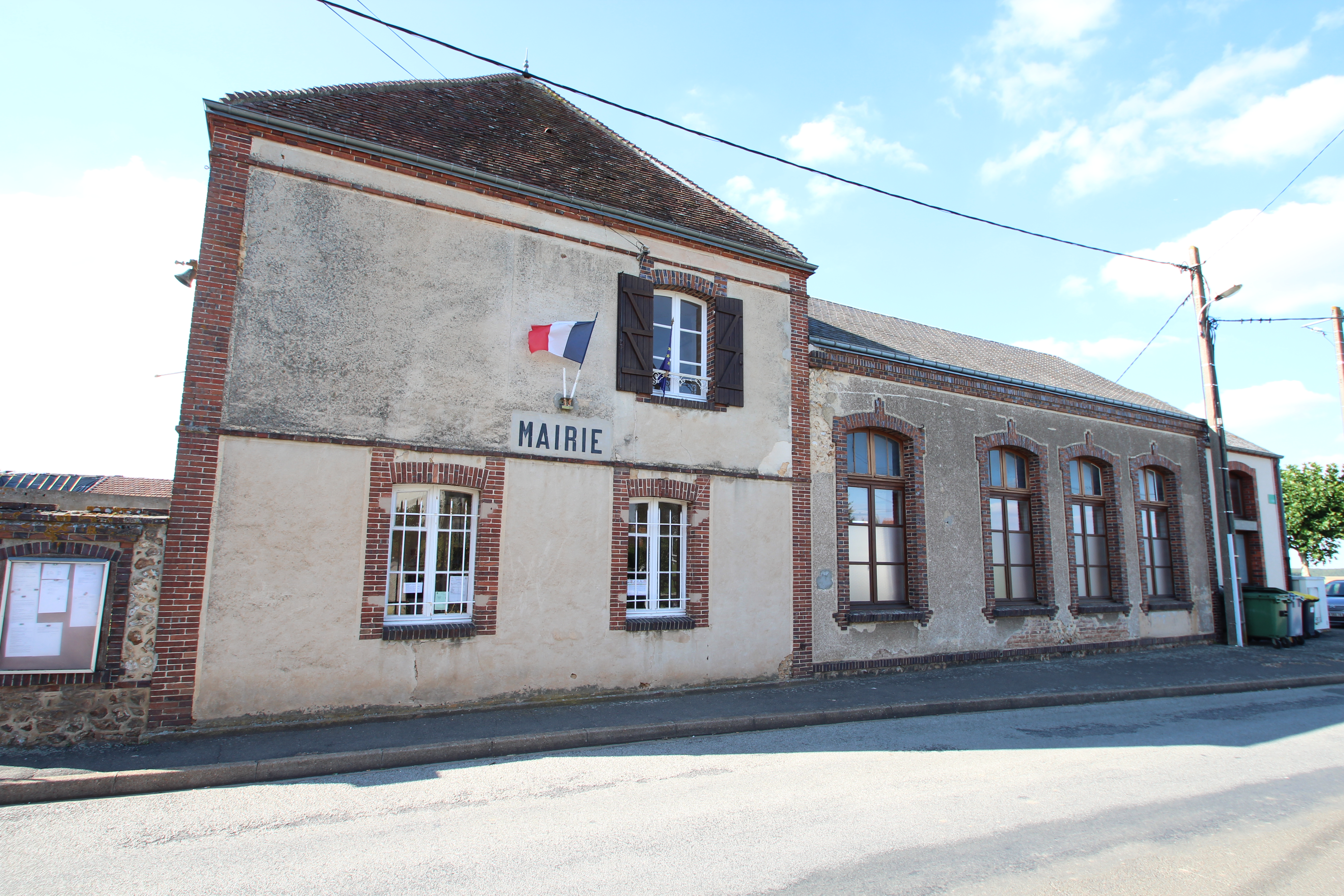
- The town hall in Saint-Sauveur-Marville
- Location of Saint-Sauveur-Marville
- Location within France Location within Centre-Val de Loire
- Coordinates: 48°35′46″N 1°16′48″E
- Country: France
- Region: Centre-Val de Loire
- Department: Eure-et-Loir
- Arrondissement: Dreux
- Canton: Saint-Lubin-des-Joncherets
- Intercommunality: CA Pays de Dreux

Government
  - Mayor (2020–2026): Gilles Blanchard
- Area^{1}: 18.84 km^{2} (7.27 sq mi)
- Elevation: 187 m (614 ft)
- Highest elevation: 202 m (663 ft)
- Lowest elevation: 134 m (440 ft)
- Population (2023): 921
  - Density: 48.9/km^{2} (127/sq mi)
- Time zone: UTC+01:00 (CET)
  - Summer (DST): UTC+02:00 (CEST)
- INSEE/Postal code: 28360 /28170
- ^{1} French Land Register data, which excludes lakes, ponds, glaciers > 1 km^{2} (0.386 sq mi or 247 acres) and river estuaries.

Saint-Sauveur-Marville (French pronunciation: [sɛ̃ sovœʁ maʁvil]) is a commune in the Eure-et-Loir department in northern France. It was created in 1972 by the merger of two former communes: Marville-les-Bois and Saint-Sauveur-Levasville.

== Geography ==
The Commune along with another 70 communes shares part of a 47,681 hectare, Natura 2000 conservation area, called the Forêts et étangs du Perche.

== Population ==
Historical population
Year	Pop.	±% p.a.
1968	411	—
1975	390	−0.75%
1982	447	+1.97%
1990	640	+4.59%
1999	755	+1.85%
2007	933	+2.68%
2012	921	−0.26%
2017	925	+0.09%
2023	921	−0.07%
Source: INSEE

== See also ==
- Communes of the Eure-et-Loir department
