= Saint-Jean-de-Rebervilliers =

- Commune
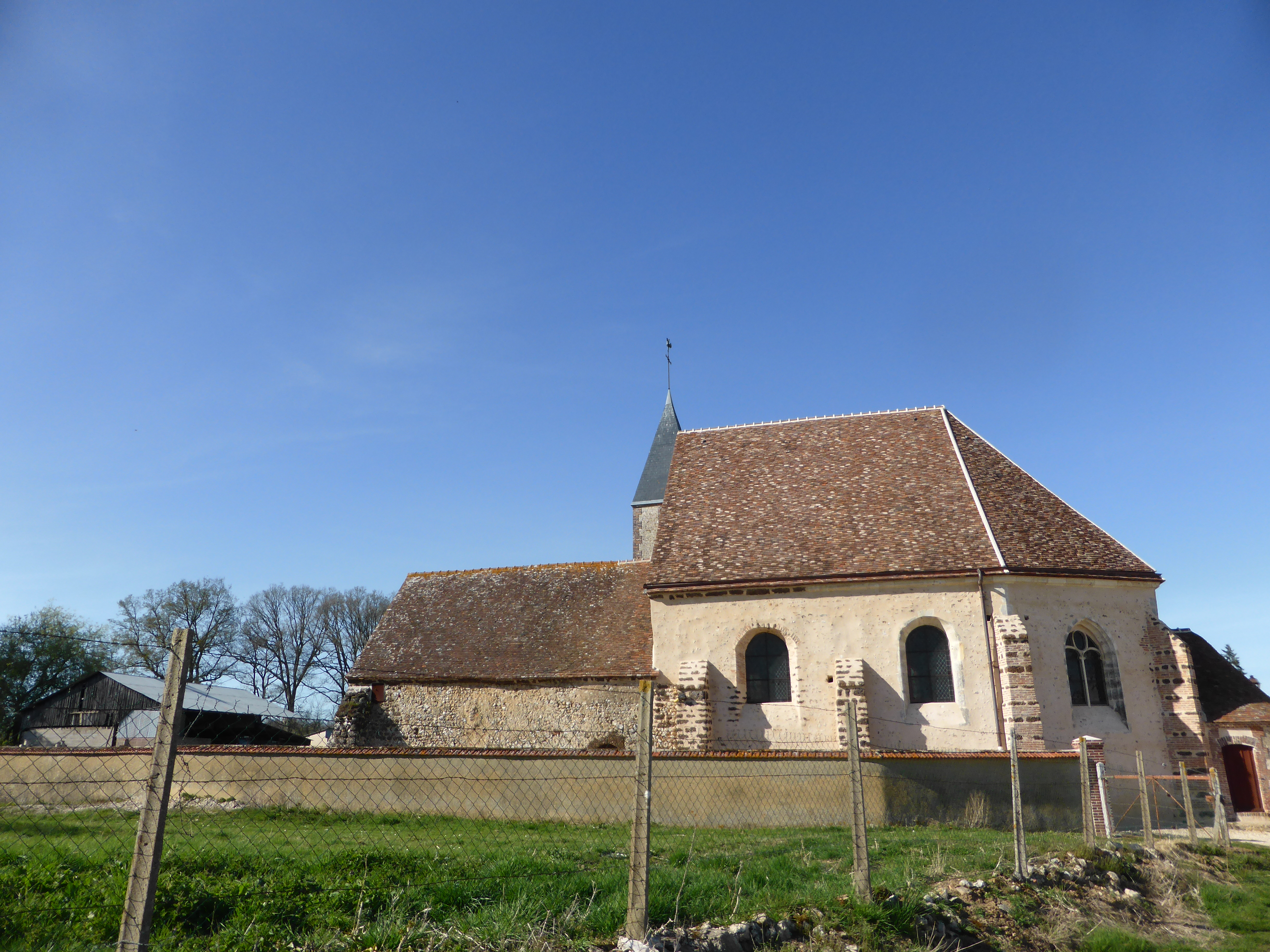
- The church in Saint-Jean-de-Rebervilliers

- Coat of arms
- Location of Saint-Jean-de-Rebervilliers
- Location within France Location within Centre-Val de Loire
- Coordinates: 48°36′44″N 1°15′06″E
- Country: France
- Region: Centre-Val de Loire
- Department: Eure-et-Loir
- Arrondissement: Dreux
- Canton: Saint-Lubin-des-Joncherets
- Intercommunality: CA Pays de Dreux

Government
  - Mayor (2020–2026): Caroline Barré
- Area^{1}: 11.03 km^{2} (4.26 sq mi)
- Elevation: 190 m (620 ft)
- Highest elevation: 186 m (610 ft)
- Lowest elevation: 134 m (440 ft)
- Population (2023): 235
  - Density: 21.3/km^{2} (55.2/sq mi)
- Time zone: UTC+01:00 (CET)
  - Summer (DST): UTC+02:00 (CEST)
- INSEE/Postal code: 28341 /28170
- ^{1} French Land Register data, which excludes lakes, ponds, glaciers > 1 km^{2} (0.386 sq mi or 247 acres) and river estuaries.

Saint-Jean-de-Rebervilliers (French pronunciation: [sɛ̃ ʒɑ̃ də ʁəbɛʁvilje]) is a commune in the Eure-et-Loir department in northern France.

== Geography ==
The Commune along with another 70 communes shares part of a 47,681 hectare, Natura 2000 conservation area, called the Forêts et étangs du Perche.

== Population ==
Historical population
Year	Pop.	±% p.a.
1968	92	—
1975	103	+1.63%
1982	118	+1.96%
1990	161	+3.96%
1999	181	+1.31%
2007	215	+2.18%
2012	229	+1.27%
2017	241	+1.03%
2023	235	−0.42%
Source: INSEE

== See also ==
- Communes of the Eure-et-Loir department
