= Rohaire =

- Commune
- Location of Rohaire
- Location within France Location within Centre-Val de Loire
- Coordinates: 48°40′15″N 0°51′02″E
- Country: France
- Region: Centre-Val de Loire
- Department: Eure-et-Loir
- Arrondissement: Dreux
- Canton: Saint-Lubin-des-Joncherets

Government
  - Mayor (2020–2026): Christian Bichon
- Area^{1}: 10.01 km^{2} (3.86 sq mi)
- Elevation: 199 m (653 ft)
- Highest elevation: 218 m (715 ft)
- Lowest elevation: 185 m (607 ft)
- Population (2023): 132
  - Density: 13.2/km^{2} (34.2/sq mi)
- Time zone: UTC+01:00 (CET)
  - Summer (DST): UTC+02:00 (CEST)
- INSEE/Postal code: 28316 /28340
- ^{1} French Land Register data, which excludes lakes, ponds, glaciers > 1 km^{2} (0.386 sq mi or 247 acres) and river estuaries.

Rohaire (French pronunciation: [ʁɔɛʁ]) is a commune in the Eure-et-Loir department in northern France.

== Population ==
Historical population
Year	Pop.	±% p.a.
1968	138	—
1975	118	−2.21%
1982	136	+2.05%
1990	120	−1.55%
1999	147	+2.28%
2007	129	−1.62%
2012	157	+4.01%
2017	127	−4.15%
2023	132	+0.65%
Source: INSEE

== See also ==
- Communes of the Eure-et-Loir department
