= Saint-Lubin-de-Cravant =

- Commune
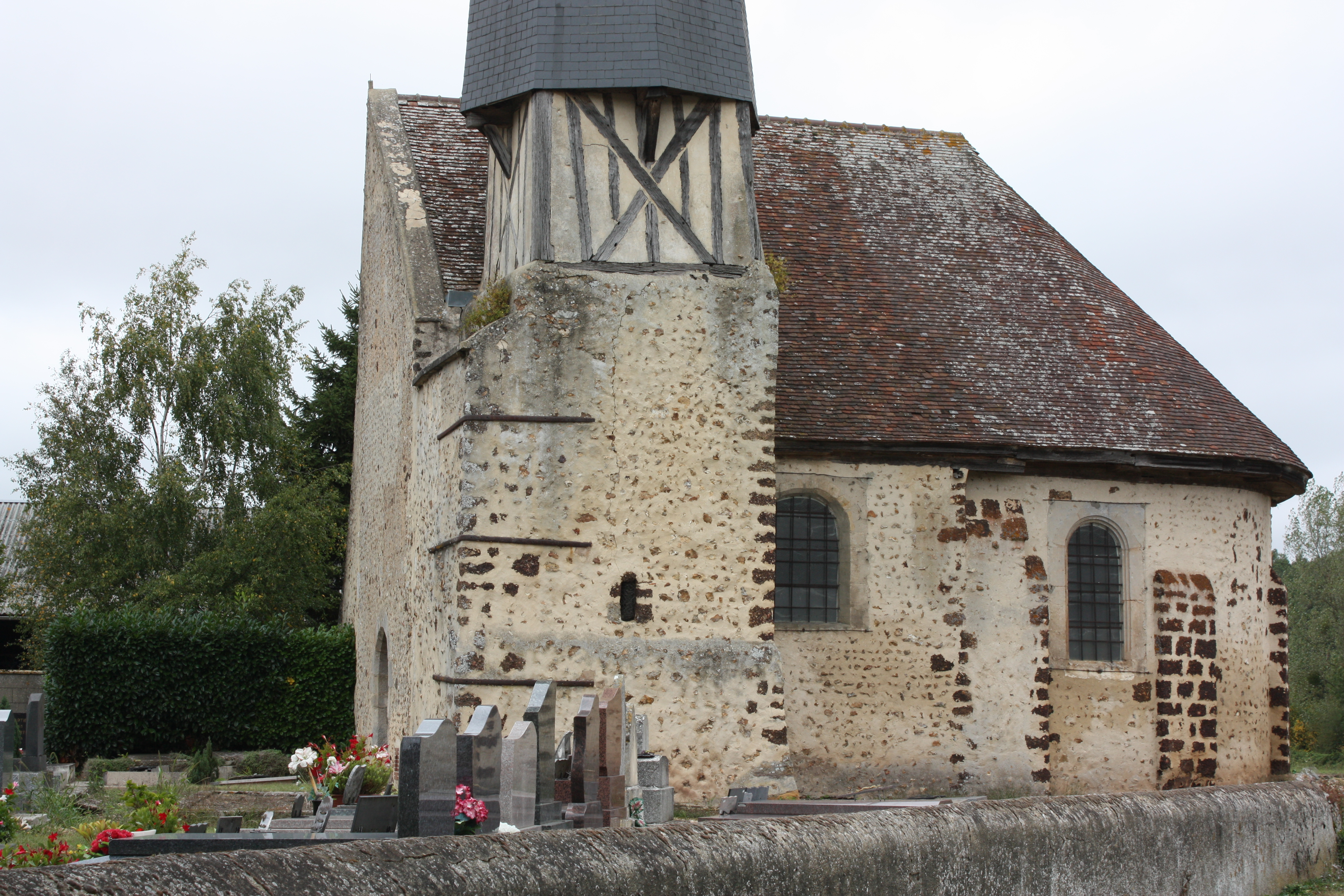
- The church in Saint-Lubin-de-Cravant
- Location of Saint-Lubin-de-Cravant
- Location within France Location within Centre-Val de Loire
- Coordinates: 48°42′43″N 1°05′19″E
- Country: France
- Region: Centre-Val de Loire
- Department: Eure-et-Loir
- Arrondissement: Dreux
- Canton: Saint-Lubin-des-Joncherets
- Intercommunality: CA Pays de Dreux

Government
  - Mayor (2020–2026): Pascal Baelen
- Area^{1}: 6.93 km^{2} (2.68 sq mi)
- Elevation: 152 m (499 ft)
- Highest elevation: 183 m (600 ft)
- Lowest elevation: 140 m (460 ft)
- Population (2023): 54
  - Density: 7.8/km^{2} (20/sq mi)
- Time zone: UTC+01:00 (CET)
  - Summer (DST): UTC+02:00 (CEST)
- INSEE/Postal code: 28346 /28270
- ^{1} French Land Register data, which excludes lakes, ponds, glaciers > 1 km^{2} (0.386 sq mi or 247 acres) and river estuaries.

Saint-Lubin-de-Cravant (French pronunciation: [sɛ̃ lybɛ̃ də kʁavɑ̃]) is a commune in the Eure-et-Loir department in northern France.

== Population ==
Historical population
Year	Pop.	±% p.a.
1968	57	—
1975	51	−1.58%
1982	53	+0.55%
1990	48	−1.23%
1999	60	+2.51%
2007	63	+0.61%
2012	56	−2.33%
2017	58	+0.70%
2023	54	−1.18%
Source: INSEE

== See also ==
- Communes of the Eure-et-Loir department
