= Bérou-la-Mulotière =

- Commune
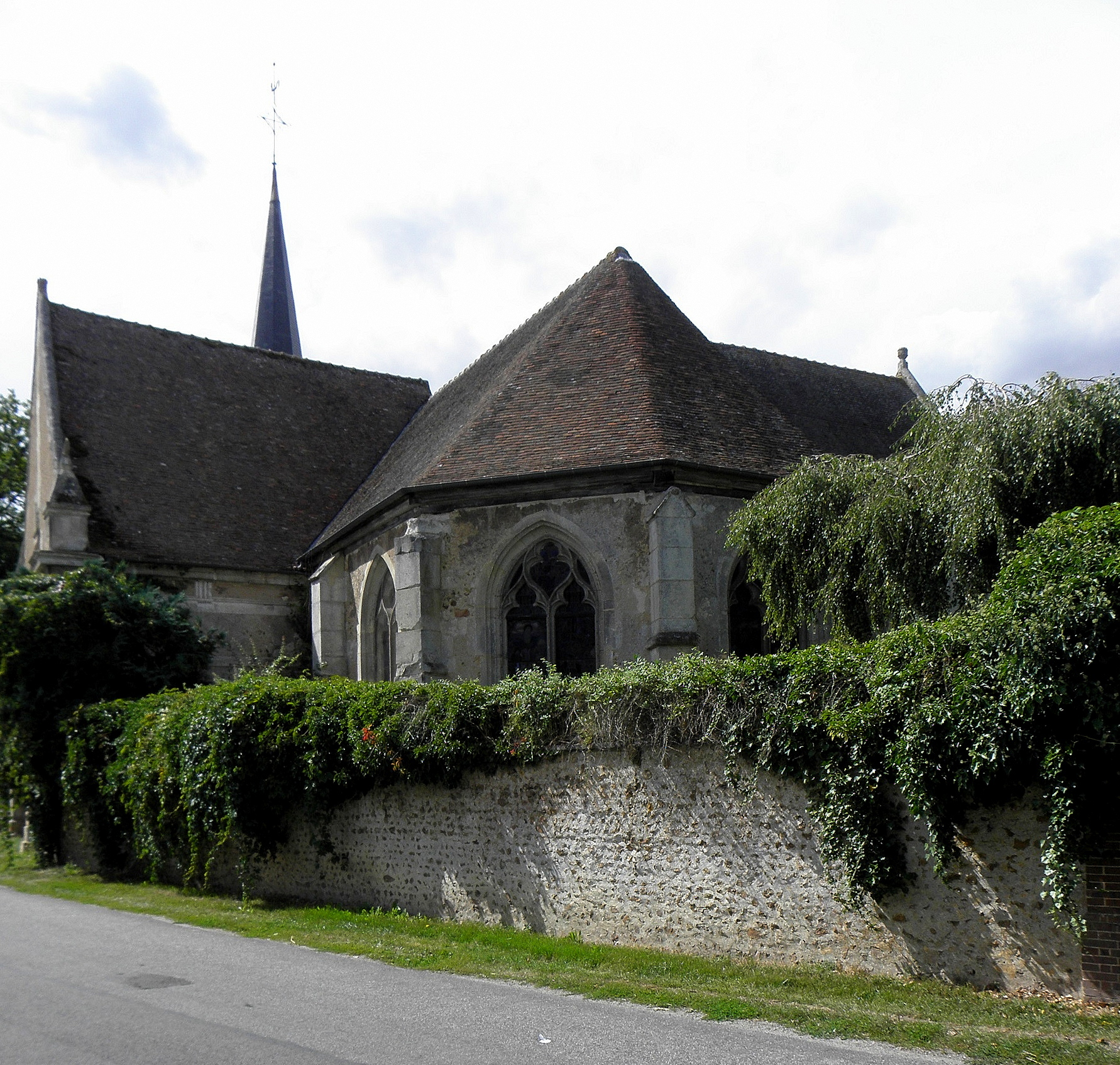
- The church in Bérou-la-Mulotière
- Location of Bérou-la-Mulotière
- Location within France Location within Centre-Val de Loire
- Coordinates: 48°44′44″N 1°02′54″E
- Country: France
- Region: Centre-Val de Loire
- Department: Eure-et-Loir
- Arrondissement: Dreux
- Canton: Saint-Lubin-des-Joncherets
- Intercommunality: CA Pays de Dreux

Government
  - Mayor (2020–2026): Dagmar Bernitt
- Area^{1}: 13.2 km^{2} (5.1 sq mi)
- Elevation: 330 m (1,080 ft)
- Highest elevation: 182 m (597 ft)
- Lowest elevation: 122 m (400 ft)
- Population (2023): 345
  - Density: 26.1/km^{2} (67.7/sq mi)
- Time zone: UTC+01:00 (CET)
  - Summer (DST): UTC+02:00 (CEST)
- INSEE/Postal code: 28037 /28270
- ^{1} French Land Register data, which excludes lakes, ponds, glaciers > 1 km^{2} (0.386 sq mi or 247 acres) and river estuaries.

Bérou-la-Mulotière (French pronunciation: [beʁu la mylɔtjɛʁ]) is a commune in the Eure-et-Loir department in northern France.

== Population ==
Historical population
Year	Pop.	±% p.a.
1968	222	—
1975	193	−1.98%
1982	255	+4.06%
1990	312	+2.55%
1999	298	−0.51%
2007	326	+1.13%
2012	332	+0.37%
2017	337	+0.30%
2023	345	+0.39%
Source: INSEE

== See also ==
- Communes of the Eure-et-Loir department
