= Escorpain =

- Commune
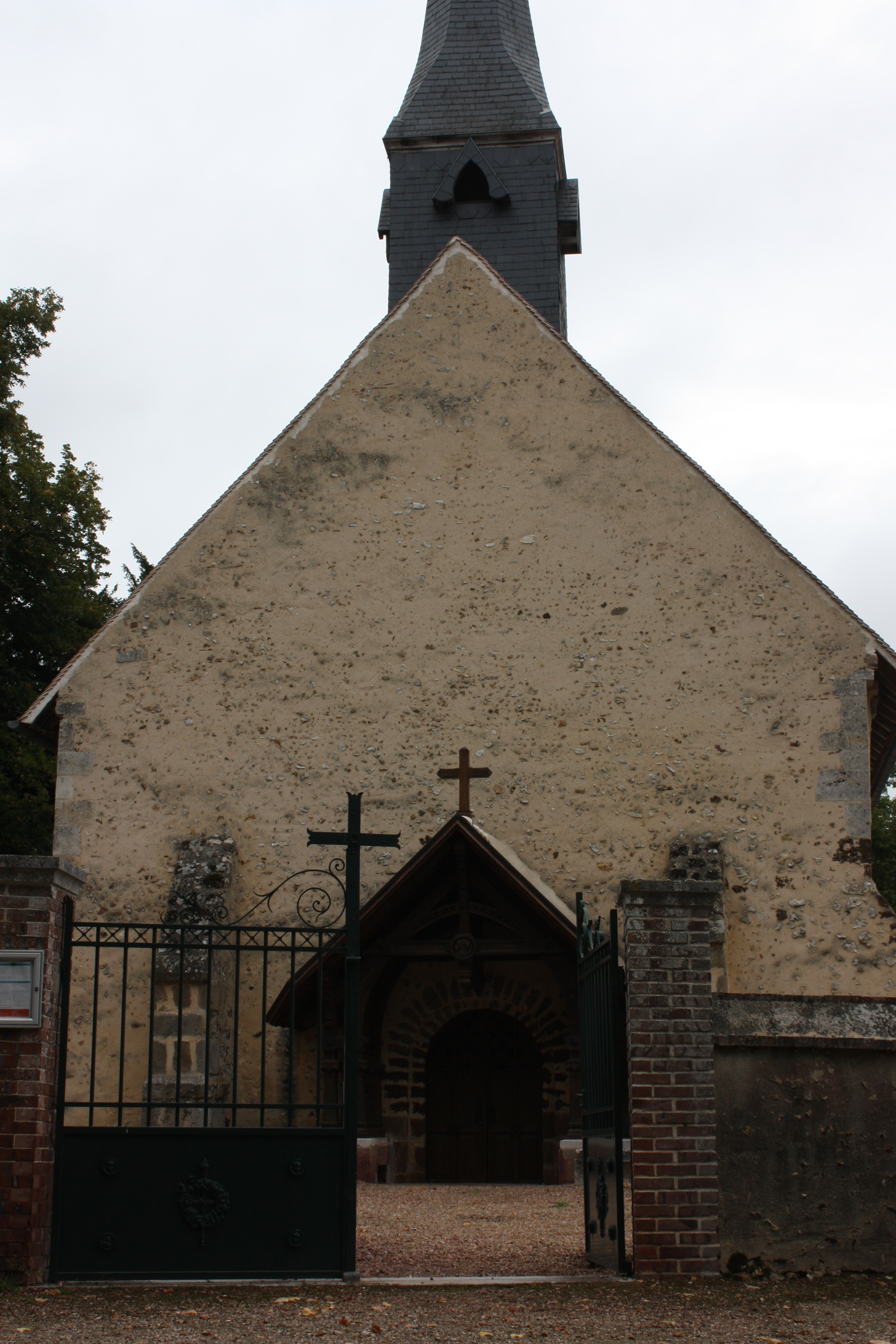
- The church in Escorpain
- Location of Escorpain
- Location within France Location within Centre-Val de Loire
- Coordinates: 48°43′20″N 1°12′33″E
- Country: France
- Region: Centre-Val de Loire
- Department: Eure-et-Loir
- Arrondissement: Dreux
- Canton: Saint-Lubin-des-Joncherets
- Intercommunality: CA Pays de Dreux

Government
  - Mayor (2020–2026): Stéphan Debacker
- Area^{1}: 9.42 km^{2} (3.64 sq mi)
- Elevation: 140 m (460 ft)
- Highest elevation: 167 m (548 ft)
- Lowest elevation: 129 m (423 ft)
- Population (2023): 223
  - Density: 23.7/km^{2} (61.3/sq mi)
- Time zone: UTC+01:00 (CET)
  - Summer (DST): UTC+02:00 (CEST)
- INSEE/Postal code: 28143 /28270
- ^{1} French Land Register data, which excludes lakes, ponds, glaciers > 1 km^{2} (0.386 sq mi or 247 acres) and river estuaries.

Escorpain is a commune in the Eure-et-Loir department in northern France.

== Population ==
Historical population
Year	Pop.	±% p.a.
1968	159	—
1975	133	−2.52%
1982	136	+0.32%
1990	175	+3.20%
1999	225	+2.83%
2007	259	+1.77%
2012	255	−0.31%
2017	248	−0.56%
2023	223	−1.76%
Source: INSEE

== See also ==
- Communes of the Eure-et-Loir department
