= Les Châtelets =

- Commune
- Coat of arms
- Location of Les Châtelets
- Location within France Location within Centre-Val de Loire
- Coordinates: 48°39′06″N 1°00′46″E
- Country: France
- Region: Centre-Val de Loire
- Department: Eure-et-Loir
- Arrondissement: Dreux
- Canton: Saint-Lubin-des-Joncherets
- Intercommunality: CA Pays de Dreux

Government
  - Mayor (2020–2026): Guillaume Barat
- Area^{1}: 9.92 km^{2} (3.83 sq mi)
- Elevation: 180 m (590 ft)
- Highest elevation: 202 m (663 ft)
- Lowest elevation: 163 m (535 ft)
- Population (2023): 111
  - Density: 11.2/km^{2} (29.0/sq mi)
- Time zone: UTC+01:00 (CET)
  - Summer (DST): UTC+02:00 (CEST)
- INSEE/Postal code: 28090 /28270
- ^{1} French Land Register data, which excludes lakes, ponds, glaciers > 1 km^{2} (0.386 sq mi or 247 acres) and river estuaries.

Les Châtelets (French pronunciation: [le ʃatlɛ]) is a commune in the Eure-et-Loir department in northern France.

== Population ==
Historical population
Year	Pop.	±% p.a.
1968	122	—
1975	96	−3.37%
1982	82	−2.23%
1990	111	+3.86%
1999	92	−2.06%
2007	106	+1.79%
2012	94	−2.37%
2017	99	+1.04%
2023	111	+1.93%
Source: INSEE

== See also ==
- Communes of the Eure-et-Loir department
