= Boissy-lès-Perche =

- Commune
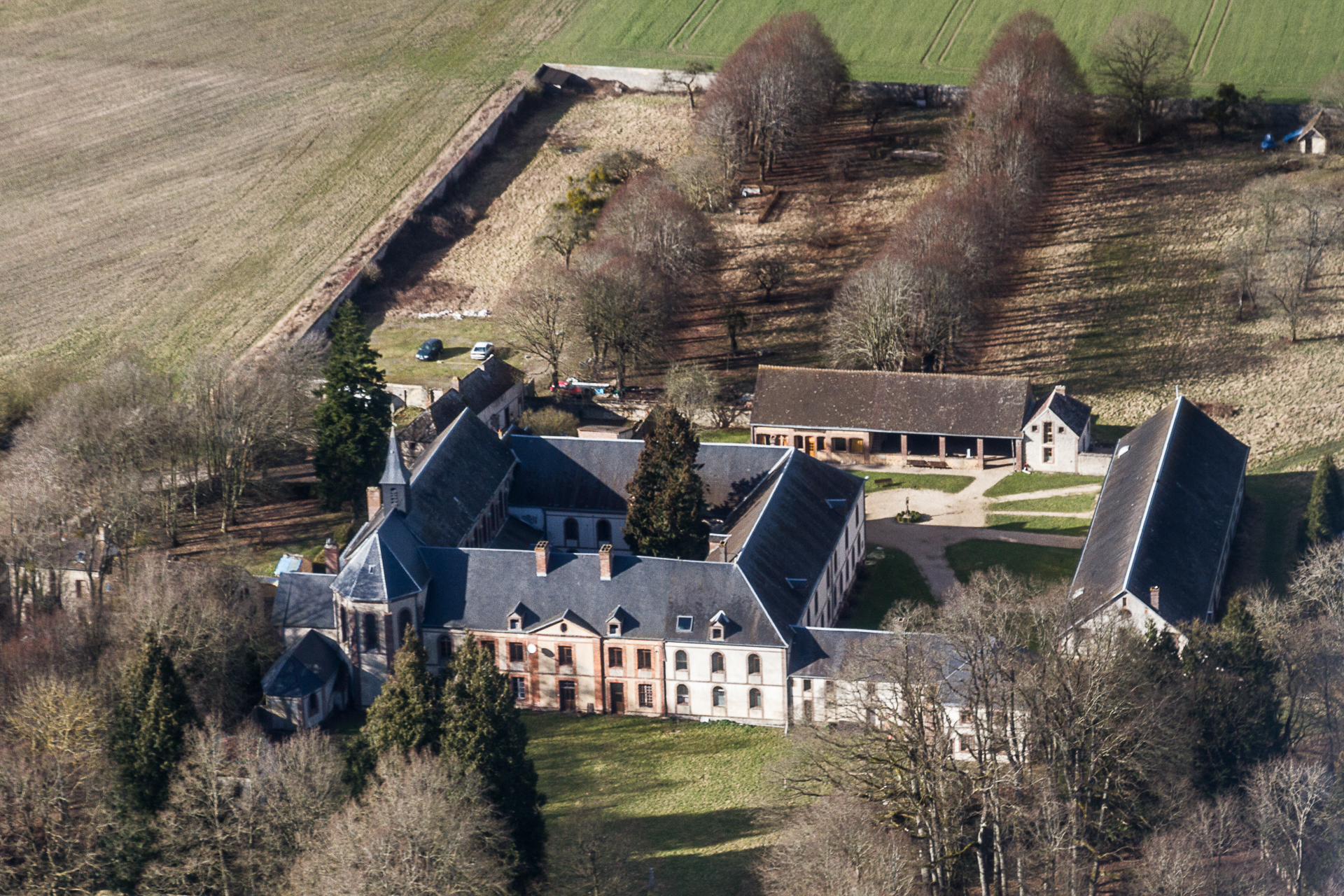
- An aerial view of the Cour Pétral
- Location of Boissy-lès-Perche
- Location within France Location within Centre-Val de Loire
- Coordinates: 48°41′09″N 0°53′21″E
- Country: France
- Region: Centre-Val de Loire
- Department: Eure-et-Loir
- Arrondissement: Dreux
- Canton: Saint-Lubin-des-Joncherets
- Intercommunality: Forêts du Perche

Government
  - Mayor (2020–2026): Christophe Lefébure
- Area^{1}: 33.66 km^{2} (13.00 sq mi)
- Elevation: 188 m (617 ft)
- Highest elevation: 233 m (764 ft)
- Lowest elevation: 165 m (541 ft)
- Population (2023): 497
  - Density: 14.8/km^{2} (38.2/sq mi)
- Time zone: UTC+01:00 (CET)
  - Summer (DST): UTC+02:00 (CEST)
- INSEE/Postal code: 28046 /28340
- ^{1} French Land Register data, which excludes lakes, ponds, glaciers > 1 km^{2} (0.386 sq mi or 247 acres) and river estuaries.

Boissy-lès-Perche (French pronunciation: [bwasi lɛ pɛʁʃ], literally Boissy near Perche) is a commune in the Eure-et-Loir department in northern France.

== Population ==
Historical population
Year	Pop.	±% p.a.
1968	474	—
1975	418	−1.78%
1982	507	+2.80%
1990	513	+0.15%
1999	534	+0.45%
2007	518	−0.38%
2012	519	+0.04%
2017	498	−0.82%
2023	497	−0.03%
Source: INSEE

== See also ==
- Communes of the Eure-et-Loir department
