= Lamblore =

- Commune
- Location of Lamblore
- Location within France Location within Centre-Val de Loire
- Coordinates: 48°37′33″N 0°55′10″E
- Country: France
- Region: Centre-Val de Loire
- Department: Eure-et-Loir
- Arrondissement: Dreux
- Canton: Saint-Lubin-des-Joncherets

Government
  - Mayor (2020–2026): Gérard Le Balc'h
- Area^{1}: 10.8 km^{2} (4.2 sq mi)
- Elevation: 232 m (761 ft)
- Highest elevation: 252 m (827 ft)
- Lowest elevation: 214 m (702 ft)
- Population (2023): 318
  - Density: 29.4/km^{2} (76.3/sq mi)
- Time zone: UTC+01:00 (CET)
  - Summer (DST): UTC+02:00 (CEST)
- INSEE/Postal code: 28202 /28340
- ^{1} French Land Register data, which excludes lakes, ponds, glaciers > 1 km^{2} (0.386 sq mi or 247 acres) and river estuaries.

Lamblore (French pronunciation: [lɑ̃blɔʁ]) is a commune in the Eure-et-Loir department in northern France.

== Geography ==
The Commune along with another 70 communes shares part of a 47,681 hectare, Natura 2000 conservation area, called the Forêts et étangs du Perche.

== Population ==
Historical population
Year	Pop.	±% p.a.
1968	268	—
1975	214	−3.16%
1982	319	+5.87%
1990	358	+1.45%
1999	375	+0.52%
2007	397	+0.72%
2012	372	−1.29%
2017	333	−2.19%
2023	318	−0.77%
Source: INSEE

== See also ==
- Communes of the Eure-et-Loir department
