= Saint-Maixme-Hauterive =

- Commune
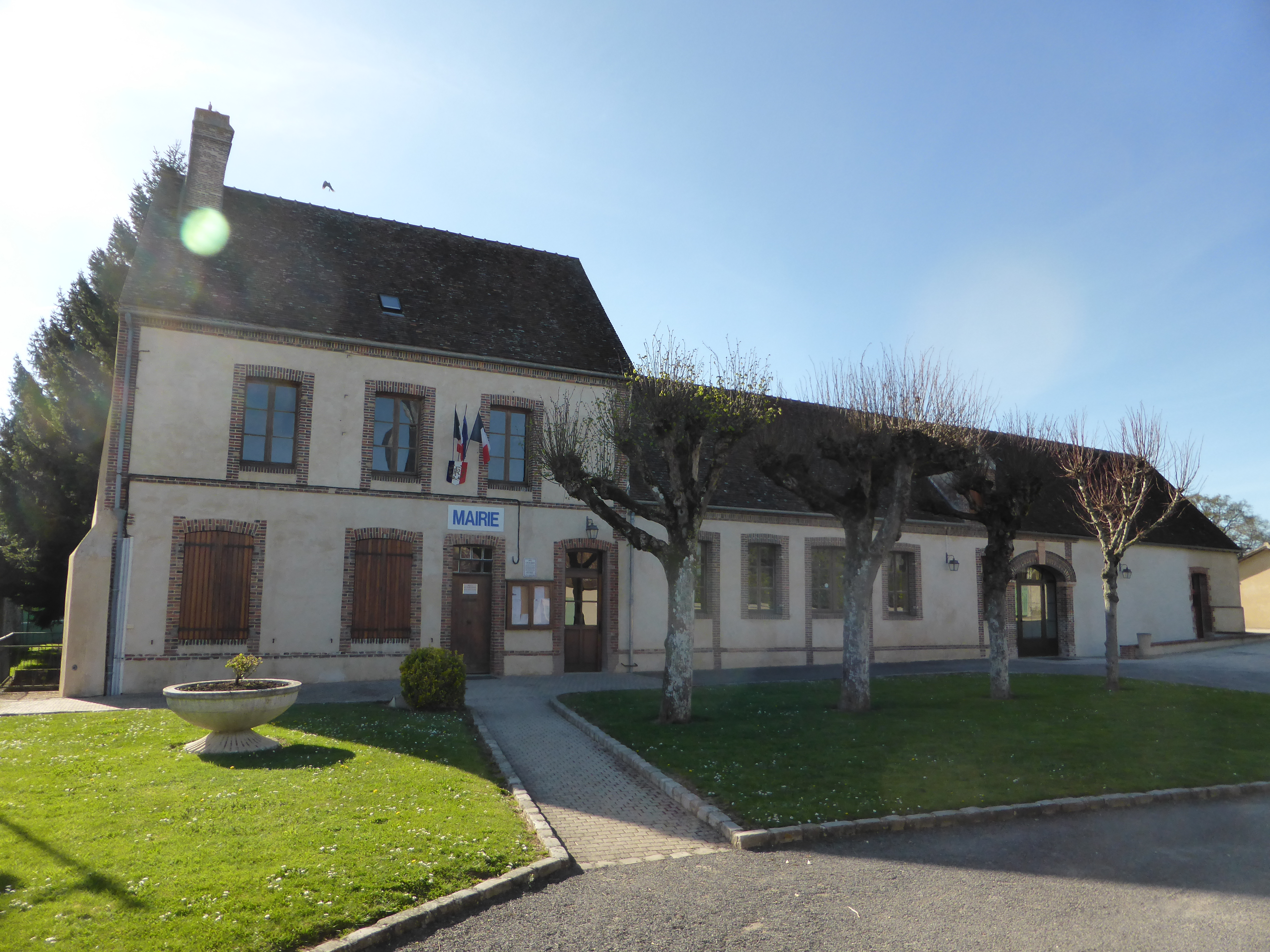
- The town hall in Saint-Maixme-Hauterive
- Location of Saint-Maixme-Hauterive
- Location within France Location within Centre-Val de Loire
- Coordinates: 48°35′19″N 1°10′59″E
- Country: France
- Region: Centre-Val de Loire
- Department: Eure-et-Loir
- Arrondissement: Dreux
- Canton: Saint-Lubin-des-Joncherets
- Intercommunality: CA Pays de Dreux

Government
  - Mayor (2020–2026): Christophe Helias
- Area^{1}: 31.95 km^{2} (12.34 sq mi)
- Highest elevation: 224 m (735 ft)
- Lowest elevation: 151 m (495 ft)
- Population (2023): 420
  - Density: 13/km^{2} (34/sq mi)
- Time zone: UTC+01:00 (CET)
  - Summer (DST): UTC+02:00 (CEST)
- INSEE/Postal code: 28351 /28170
- ^{1} French Land Register data, which excludes lakes, ponds, glaciers > 1 km^{2} (0.386 sq mi or 247 acres) and river estuaries.

Saint-Maixme-Hauterive (French pronunciation: [sɛ̃ mɛm otʁiv]) is a commune in the Eure-et-Loir department in northern France.

== Geography ==
The Commune along with another 70 communes shares part of a 47,681 hectare, Natura 2000 conservation area, called the Forêts et étangs du Perche.

== Population ==
Historical population
Year	Pop.	±% p.a.
1968	234	—
1975	243	+0.54%
1982	265	+1.25%
1990	316	+2.22%
1999	349	+1.11%
2007	427	+2.55%
2012	443	+0.74%
2017	418	−1.16%
2023	420	+0.08%
Source: INSEE

== See also ==
- Communes of the Eure-et-Loir department
