= Puiseux, Eure-et-Loir =

Puiseux
- Commune
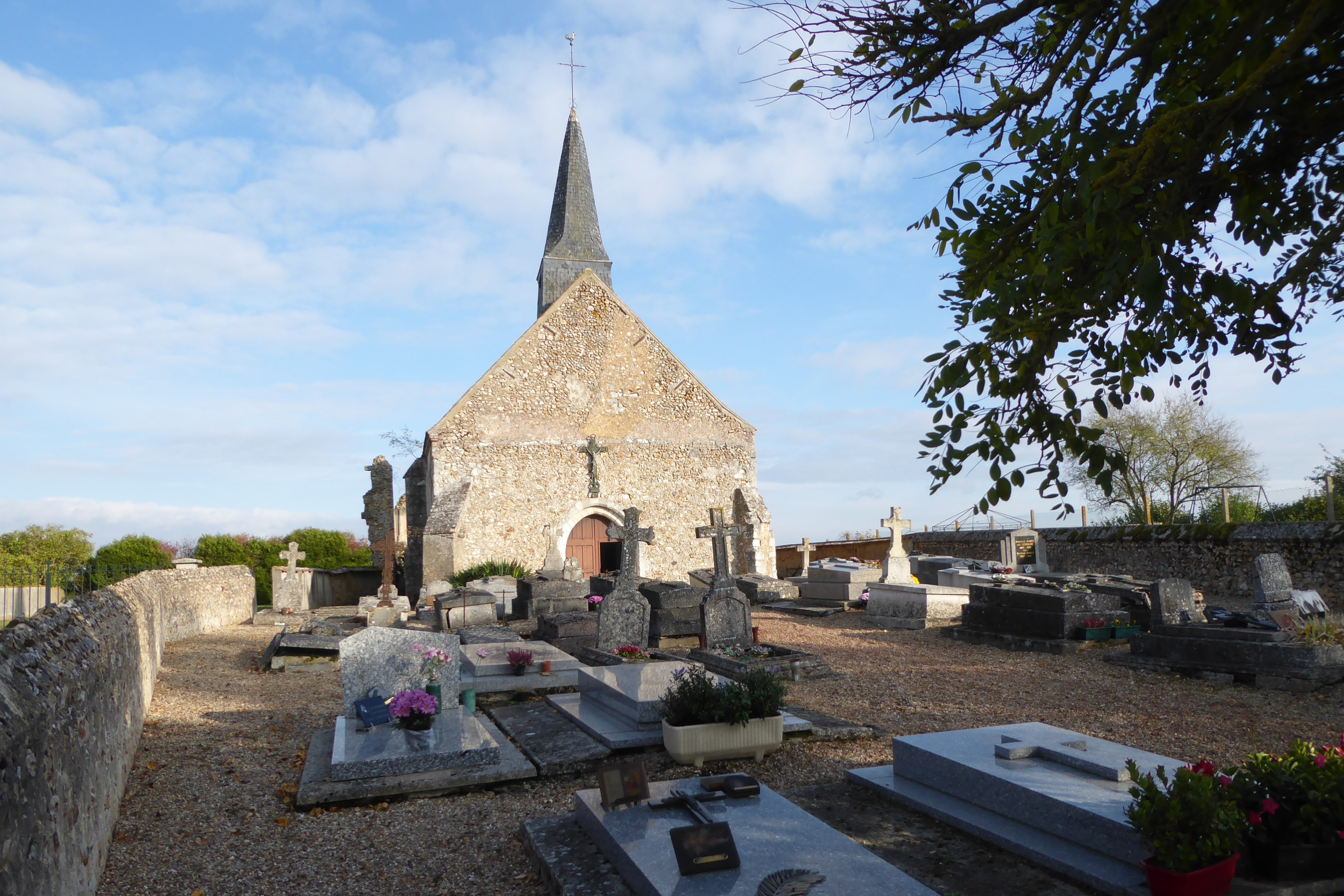
- The church in Puiseux

- Coat of arms
- Location of Puiseux
- Location within France Location within Centre-Val de Loire
- Coordinates: 48°38′16″N 1°22′33″E
- Country: France
- Region: Centre-Val de Loire
- Department: Eure-et-Loir
- Arrondissement: Dreux
- Canton: Saint-Lubin-des-Joncherets
- Intercommunality: CA Pays de Dreux

Government
  - Mayor (2020–2026): Pervenche Chauvin
- Area^{1}: 5.22 km^{2} (2.02 sq mi)
- Elevation: 154 m (505 ft)
- Highest elevation: 183 m (600 ft)
- Lowest elevation: 142 m (466 ft)
- Population (2023): 136
  - Density: 26.1/km^{2} (67.5/sq mi)
- Time zone: UTC+01:00 (CET)
  - Summer (DST): UTC+02:00 (CEST)
- INSEE/Postal code: 28312 /28170
- ^{1} French Land Register data, which excludes lakes, ponds, glaciers > 1 km^{2} (0.386 sq mi or 247 acres) and river estuaries.

Puiseux (French pronunciation: [pɥizø]) is a commune in the Eure-et-Loir department in northern France.

== Population ==
Historical population
Year	Pop.	±% p.a.
1968	70	—
1975	110	+6.67%
1982	100	−1.35%
1990	108	+0.97%
1999	113	+0.50%
2007	111	−0.22%
2012	135	+3.99%
2017	136	+0.15%
2023	136	+0.00%
Source: INSEE

== See also ==
- Communes of the Eure-et-Loir department
