= Le Mesnil-Thomas =

- Commune
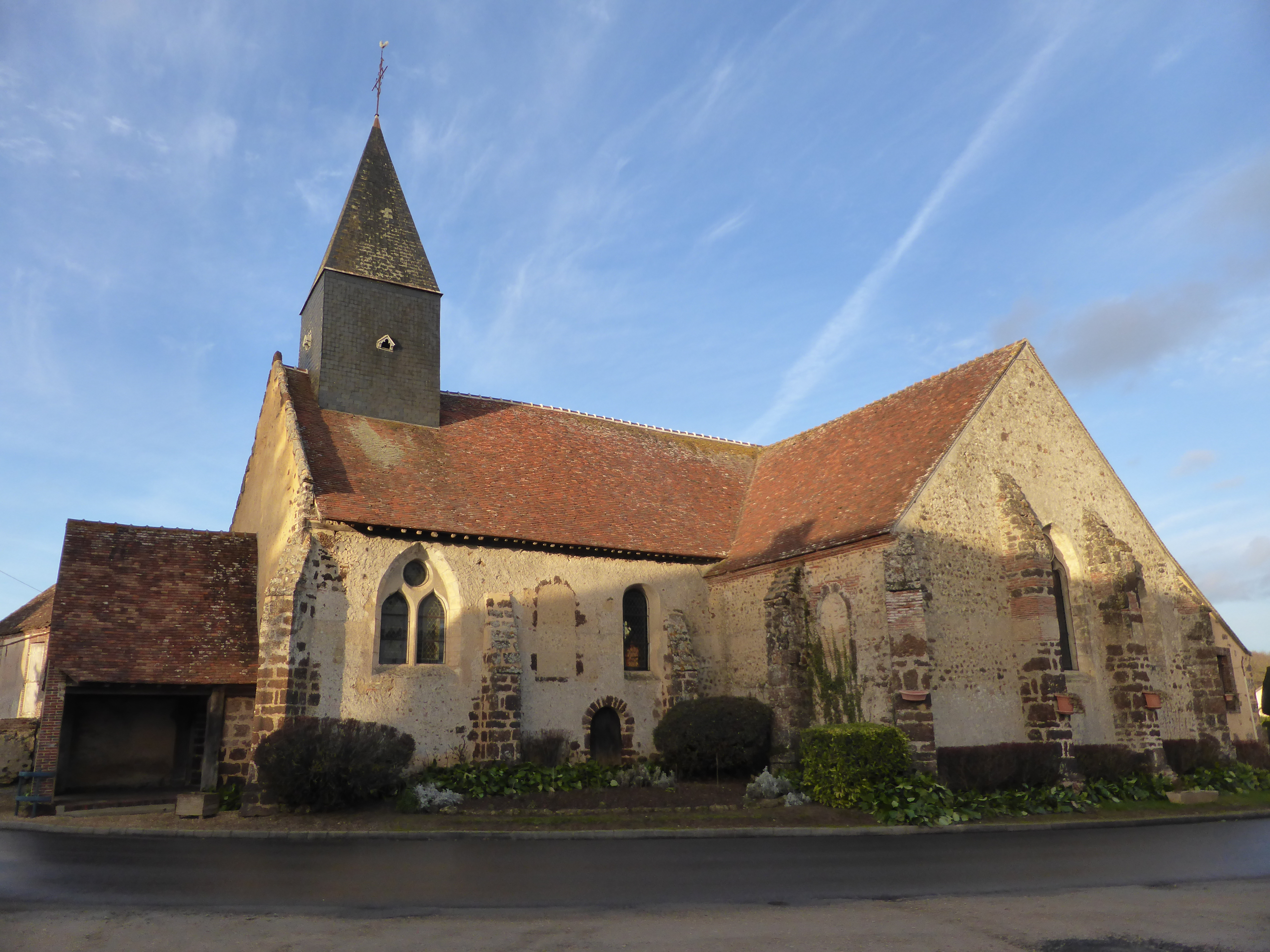
- The church in Le Mesnil-Thomas
- Location of Le Mesnil-Thomas
- Location within France Location within Centre-Val de Loire
- Coordinates: 48°36′02″N 1°05′48″E
- Country: France
- Region: Centre-Val de Loire
- Department: Eure-et-Loir
- Arrondissement: Dreux
- Canton: Saint-Lubin-des-Joncherets
- Intercommunality: Forêts du Perche

Government
  - Mayor (2020–2026): Laurent Bourgeois
- Area^{1}: 16.34 km^{2} (6.31 sq mi)
- Elevation: 190 m (620 ft)
- Highest elevation: 224 m (735 ft)
- Lowest elevation: 168 m (551 ft)
- Population (2023): 335
  - Density: 20.5/km^{2} (53.1/sq mi)
- Time zone: UTC+01:00 (CET)
  - Summer (DST): UTC+02:00 (CEST)
- INSEE/Postal code: 28248 /28250
- ^{1} French Land Register data, which excludes lakes, ponds, glaciers > 1 km^{2} (0.386 sq mi or 247 acres) and river estuaries.

Le Mesnil-Thomas (French pronunciation: [lə mɛnil tɔmɑ]) is a commune in the Eure-et-Loir department in northern France.

== Population ==
Historical population
Year	Pop.	±% p.a.
1968	301	—
1975	254	−2.40%
1982	286	+1.71%
1990	250	−1.67%
1999	290	+1.66%
2007	325	+1.43%
2012	348	+1.38%
2017	335	−0.76%
2023	335	+0.00%
Source: INSEE

== See also ==
- Communes of the Eure-et-Loir department
