= La Puisaye =

- Commune
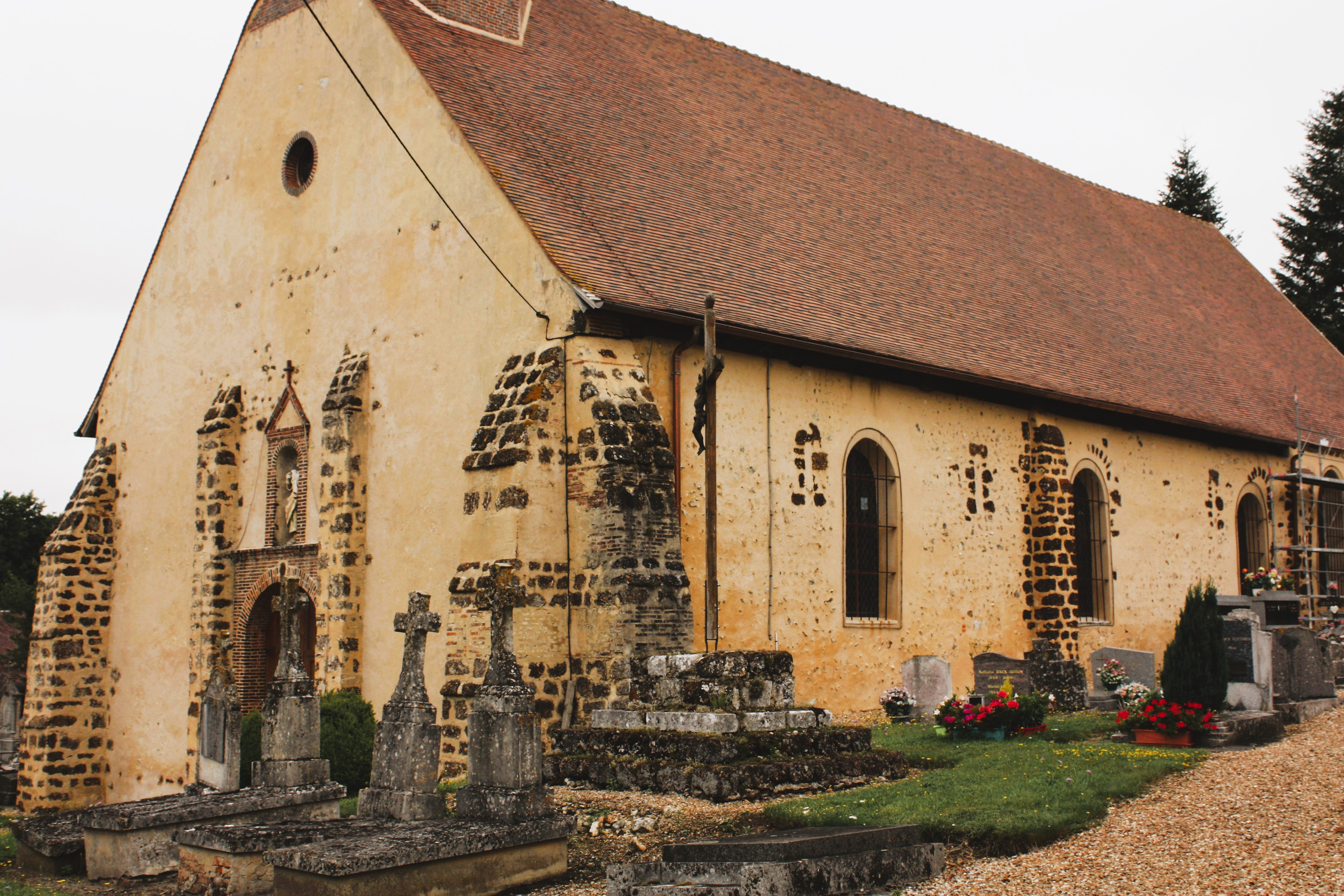
- The church in La Puisaye
- Location of La Puisaye
- Location within France Location within Centre-Val de Loire
- Coordinates: 48°36′35″N 0°57′25″E
- Country: France
- Region: Centre-Val de Loire
- Department: Eure-et-Loir
- Arrondissement: Dreux
- Canton: Saint-Lubin-des-Joncherets
- Intercommunality: Forêts du Perche

Government
  - Mayor (2020–2026): Philippe Debatisse
- Area^{1}: 20.5 km^{2} (7.9 sq mi)
- Elevation: 236 m (774 ft)
- Highest elevation: 252 m (827 ft)
- Lowest elevation: 194 m (636 ft)
- Population (2023): 248
  - Density: 12.1/km^{2} (31.3/sq mi)
- Time zone: UTC+01:00 (CET)
  - Summer (DST): UTC+02:00 (CEST)
- INSEE/Postal code: 28310 /28250
- ^{1} French Land Register data, which excludes lakes, ponds, glaciers > 1 km^{2} (0.386 sq mi or 247 acres) and river estuaries.

La Puisaye (French pronunciation: [la pɥizɛ]) is a commune in the Eure-et-Loir department in northern France.

== Geography ==
The Commune along with another 70 communes shares part of a 47,681 hectare, Natura 2000 conservation area, called the Forêts et étangs du Perche.

== Population ==
Historical population
Year	Pop.	±% p.a.
1968	308	—
1975	259	−2.44%
1982	259	+0.00%
1990	208	−2.70%
1999	225	+0.88%
2007	247	+1.17%
2012	270	+1.80%
2017	278	+0.59%
2023	248	−1.89%
Source: INSEE

== History ==
The Romans gave to the land of the Puisaye Podiacia name, due to unevenness of the surface that word (says the Encyclopedia) meaning a mountainous country It was covered with thick forests, and believed to have been the center "of Gaul, where the Druids held their meetings of annuals. ' Francais It is believed that the name Puisaye or Puisaye from the lords whom he fell in sharing during the conquest of Gaul and the establishment of the monarchy. Although the conduct and the end of this major war against the king, were also glorious to Louis le Gros, the results were advantageous to him - himself and his descendants, it seems the false policy which brought modern historians to distort even the names of the leaders of the Confederacy.

== See also ==
- Communes of the Eure-et-Loir department
