= Dampierre-sur-Avre =

- Commune
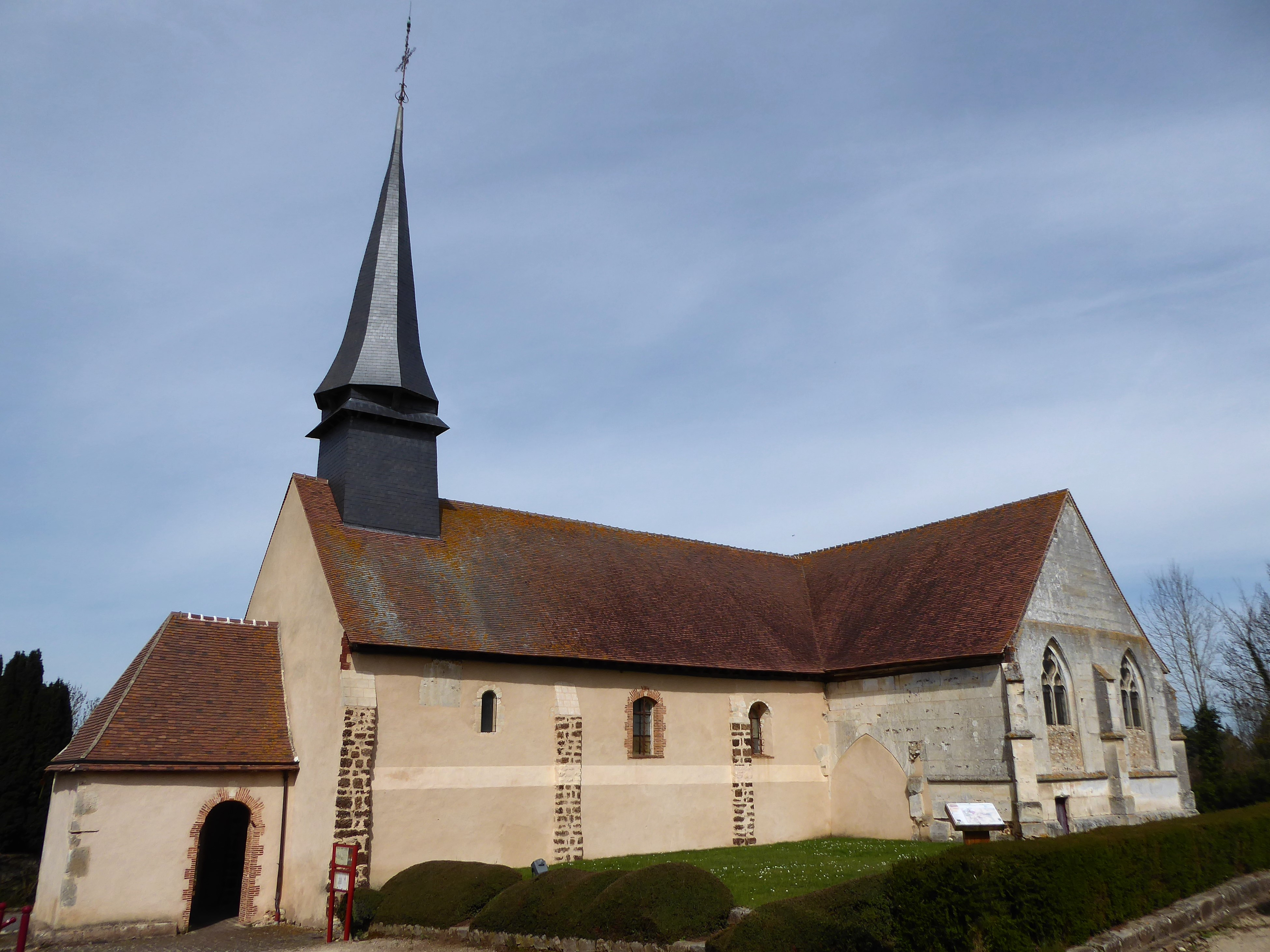
- The church in Dampierre-sur-Avre
- Location of Dampierre-sur-Avre
- Location within France Location within Centre-Val de Loire
- Coordinates: 48°45′48″N 1°09′02″E
- Country: France
- Region: Centre-Val de Loire
- Department: Eure-et-Loir
- Arrondissement: Dreux
- Canton: Saint-Lubin-des-Joncherets
- Intercommunality: CA Pays de Dreux

Government
  - Mayor (2020–2026): Philippe Lechevallier
- Area^{1}: 18.27 km^{2} (7.05 sq mi)
- Elevation: 151 m (495 ft)
- Highest elevation: 177 m (581 ft)
- Lowest elevation: 106 m (348 ft)
- Population (2023): 756
  - Density: 41.4/km^{2} (107/sq mi)
- Time zone: UTC+01:00 (CET)
  - Summer (DST): UTC+02:00 (CEST)
- INSEE/Postal code: 28124 /28350
- ^{1} French Land Register data, which excludes lakes, ponds, glaciers > 1 km^{2} (0.386 sq mi or 247 acres) and river estuaries.

Dampierre-sur-Avre (French pronunciation: [dɑ̃pjɛʁ syʁ avʁ], literally Dampierre on Avre) is a commune in the Eure-et-Loir department in northern France.

== Population ==
Historical population
Year	Pop.	±% p.a.
1968	275	—
1975	248	−1.47%
1982	320	+3.71%
1990	532	+6.56%
1999	611	+1.55%
2007	692	+1.57%
2012	694	+0.06%
2017	742	+1.35%
2023	756	+0.31%
Source: INSEE

== See also ==
- Communes of the Eure-et-Loir department
