= Châtaincourt =

- Commune
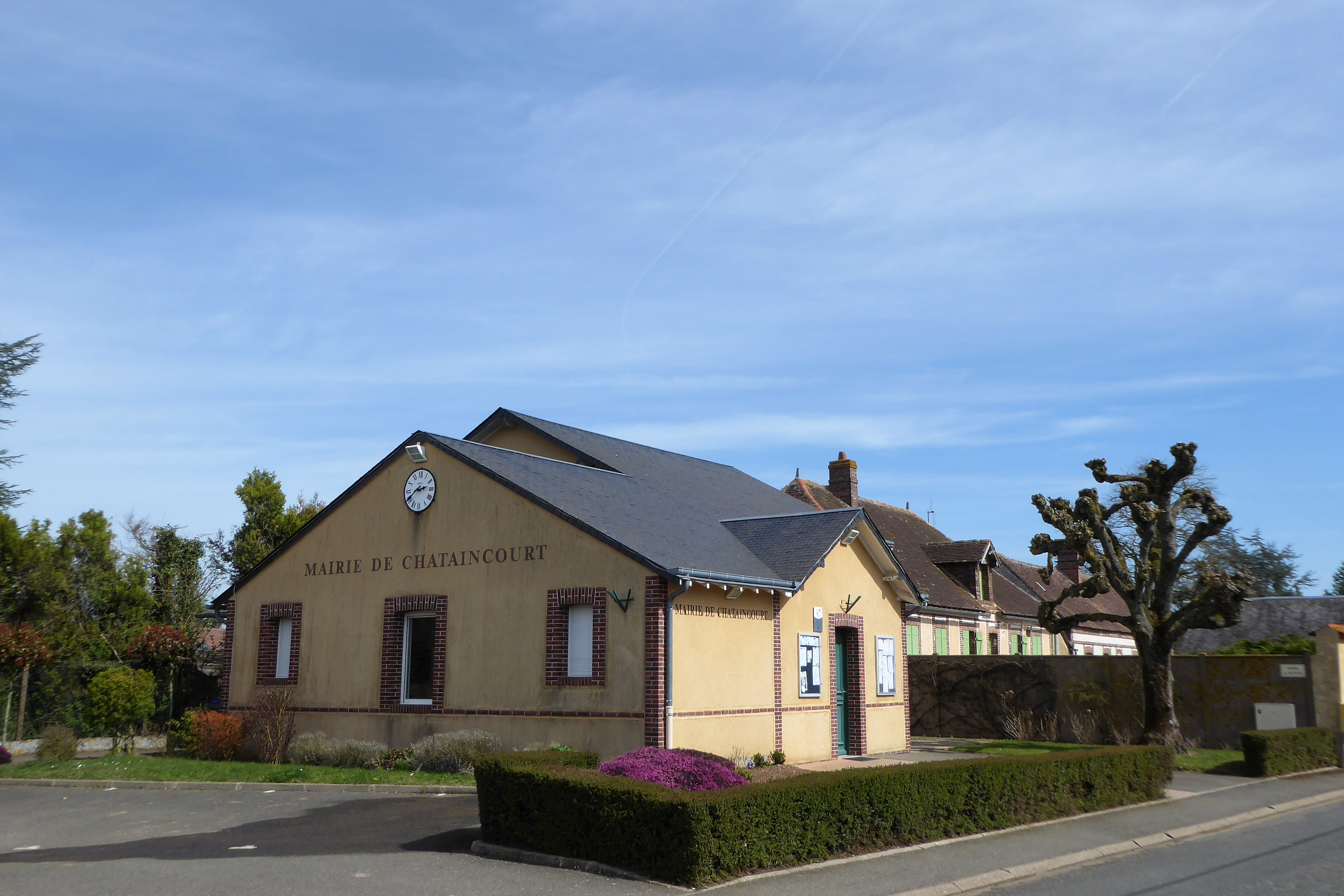
- The town hall in Châtaincourt
- Location of Châtaincourt
- Location within France Location within Centre-Val de Loire
- Coordinates: 48°41′43″N 1°13′42″E
- Country: France
- Region: Centre-Val de Loire
- Department: Eure-et-Loir
- Arrondissement: Dreux
- Canton: Saint-Lubin-des-Joncherets
- Intercommunality: CA Pays de Dreux

Government
  - Mayor (2020–2026): Emmanuel Bridron
- Area^{1}: 14.82 km^{2} (5.72 sq mi)
- Elevation: 160 m (520 ft)
- Highest elevation: 176 m (577 ft)
- Lowest elevation: 139 m (456 ft)
- Population (2023): 221
  - Density: 14.9/km^{2} (38.6/sq mi)
- Time zone: UTC+01:00 (CET)
  - Summer (DST): UTC+02:00 (CEST)
- INSEE/Postal code: 28087 /28270
- ^{1} French Land Register data, which excludes lakes, ponds, glaciers > 1 km^{2} (0.386 sq mi or 247 acres) and river estuaries.

Châtaincourt (French pronunciation: [ʃatɛ̃kuʁ]) is a commune in the Eure-et-Loir department in northern France.

== Population ==
Historical population
Year	Pop.	±% p.a.
1968	169	—
1975	143	−2.36%
1982	190	+4.14%
1990	237	+2.80%
1999	262	+1.12%
2007	247	−0.73%
2012	241	−0.49%
2017	239	−0.17%
2023	221	−1.30%
Source: INSEE

== See also ==
- Communes of the Eure-et-Loir department
