= Laons =

- Commune
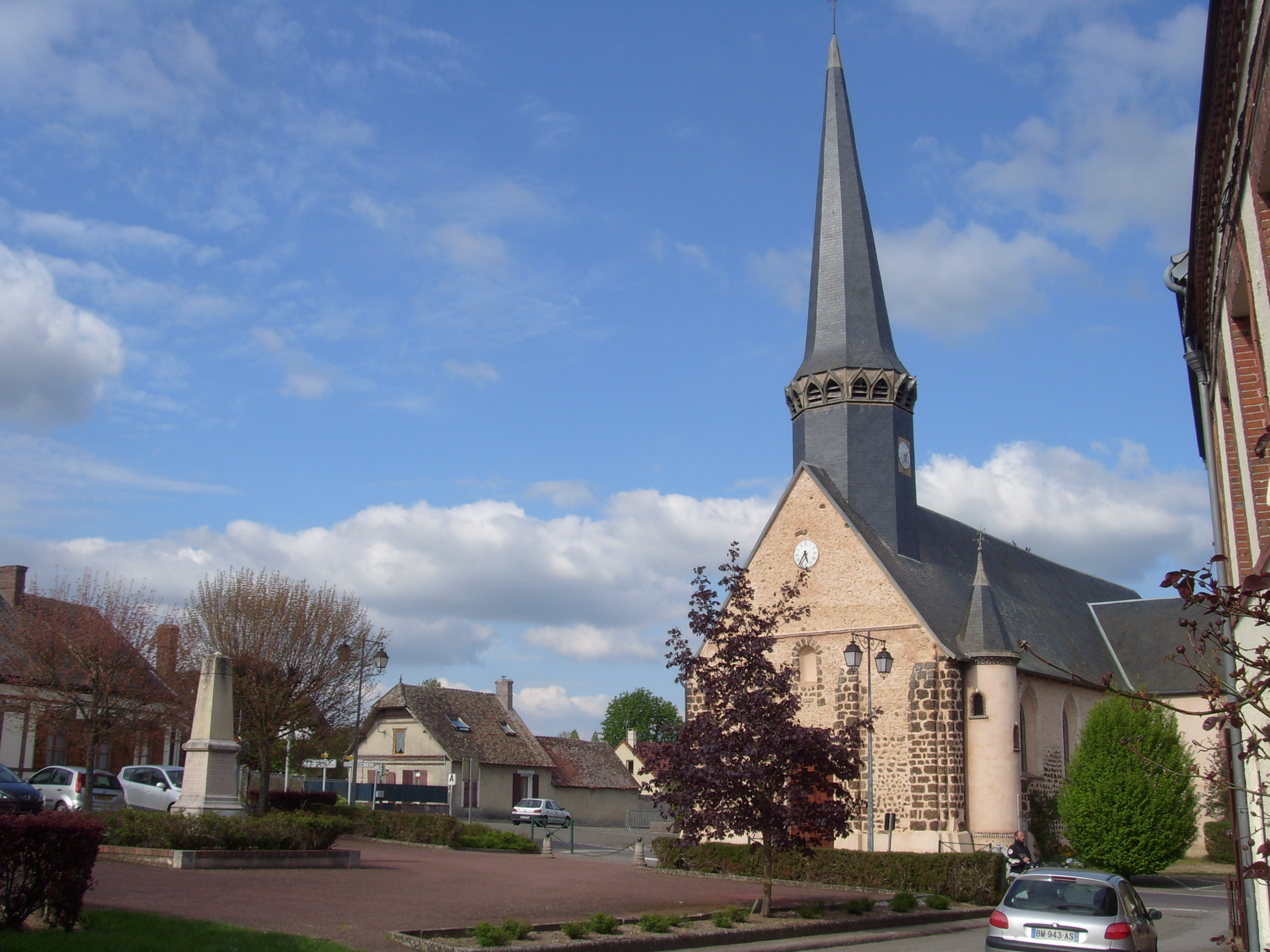
- The church and surroundings in Laons
- Location of Laons
- Location within France Location within Centre-Val de Loire
- Coordinates: 48°42′16″N 1°10′37″E
- Country: France
- Region: Centre-Val de Loire
- Department: Eure-et-Loir
- Arrondissement: Dreux
- Canton: Saint-Lubin-des-Joncherets
- Intercommunality: CA Pays de Dreux

Government
  - Mayor (2020–2026): Laurent Tremblay
- Area^{1}: 15.78 km^{2} (6.09 sq mi)
- Elevation: 166 m (545 ft)
- Highest elevation: 180 m (590 ft)
- Lowest elevation: 149 m (489 ft)
- Population (2023): 648
  - Density: 41.1/km^{2} (106/sq mi)
- Time zone: UTC+01:00 (CET)
  - Summer (DST): UTC+02:00 (CEST)
- INSEE/Postal code: 28206 /28270
- ^{1} French Land Register data, which excludes lakes, ponds, glaciers > 1 km^{2} (0.386 sq mi or 247 acres) and river estuaries.

Laons is a commune in the Eure-et-Loir department in northern France.

== Population ==
Historical population
Year	Pop.	±% p.a.
1968	426	—
1975	488	+1.96%
1982	494	+0.17%
1990	523	+0.72%
1999	660	+2.62%
2007	719	+1.08%
2012	725	+0.17%
2017	687	−1.07%
2023	648	−0.97%
Source: INSEE

== See also ==
- Communes of the Eure-et-Loir department
