= Communauté d'agglomération du Pays de Dreux =

Pays de Dreux
- Communauté d'agglomération
- Interactive map of Pays de Dreux
- Country: France
- Region: Centre-Val de Loire, Normandy
- Department: Eure, Eure-et-Loir
- No. of communes: 81
- Established: 2014
- Area: 1,055.7 km^{2} (407.6 sq mi)
- Population (2017): 115,181
  - Density: 109.10/km^{2} (282.58/sq mi)
- Website: www.dreux-agglomeration.fr

Communauté d'agglomération du Pays de Dreux is an intercommunal structure, centred on the city of Dreux. It is located in the Eure-et-Loir and Eure departments, in the Centre-Val de Loire and Normandy regions, northern France. It was created in January 2014. Its seat is in Dreux. Its area is 1055.7 km^{2}. Its population was 115,181 in 2017, of which 31,044 in Dreux proper.

== Composition ==
The communauté d'agglomération consists of the following 81 communes, of which 6 in the Eure department:

1. Abondant
2. Allainville
3. Anet
4. Ardelles
5. Aunay-sous-Crécy
6. Beauche
7. Berchères-sur-Vesgre
8. Bérou-la-Mulotière
9. Boissy-en-Drouais
10. Boncourt
11. Le Boullay-les-Deux-Églises
12. Le Boullay-Mivoye
13. Le Boullay-Thierry
14. Brezolles
15. Broué
16. Bû
17. La Chapelle-Forainvilliers
18. Charpont
19. Châtaincourt
20. Châteauneuf-en-Thymerais
21. Les Châtelets
22. La Chaussée-d'Ivry
23. Cherisy
24. Crécy-Couvé
25. Crucey-Villages
26. Dampierre-sur-Avre
27. Dreux
28. Écluzelles
29. Escorpain
30. Ézy-sur-Eure
31. Favières
32. Fessanvilliers-Mattanvilliers
33. Fontaine-les-Ribouts
34. Garancières-en-Drouais
35. Garnay
36. Germainville
37. Gilles
38. Guainville
39. Ivry-la-Bataille
40. Laons
41. Louvilliers-en-Drouais
42. Louye
43. Luray
44. La Madeleine-de-Nonancourt
45. Maillebois
46. La Mancelière
47. Marchezais
48. Marville-Moutiers-Brûlé
49. Le Mesnil-Simon
50. Mézières-en-Drouais
51. Montreuil
52. Nonancourt
53. Ormoy
54. Ouerre
55. Oulins
56. Prudemanche
57. Puiseux
58. Revercourt
59. Rouvres
60. Rueil-la-Gadelière
61. Saint-Ange-et-Torçay
62. Sainte-Gemme-Moronval
63. Saint-Georges-Motel
64. Saint-Jean-de-Rebervilliers
65. Saint-Lubin-de-Cravant
66. Saint-Lubin-des-Joncherets
67. Saint-Maixme-Hauterive
68. Saint-Ouen-Marchefroy
69. Saint-Rémy-sur-Avre
70. Saint-Sauveur-Marville
71. Saulnières
72. Saussay
73. Serazereux
74. Serville
75. Sorel-Moussel
76. Thimert-Gâtelles
77. Tremblay-les-Villages
78. Tréon
79. Vernouillet
80. Vert-en-Drouais
81. Villemeux-sur-Eure
