= La Chapelle-Fortin =

- Commune
- Location of La Chapelle-Fortin
- Location within France Location within Centre-Val de Loire
- Coordinates: 48°38′42″N 0°51′57″E
- Country: France
- Region: Centre-Val de Loire
- Department: Eure-et-Loir
- Arrondissement: Dreux
- Canton: Saint-Lubin-des-Joncherets
- Intercommunality: Forêts du Perche

Government
  - Mayor (2020–2026): Gérard Desvaux
- Area^{1}: 14.41 km^{2} (5.56 sq mi)
- Elevation: 222 m (728 ft)
- Highest elevation: 240 m (790 ft)
- Lowest elevation: 199 m (653 ft)
- Population (2023): 167
  - Density: 11.6/km^{2} (30.0/sq mi)
- Time zone: UTC+01:00 (CET)
  - Summer (DST): UTC+02:00 (CEST)
- INSEE/Postal code: 28077 /28340
- ^{1} French Land Register data, which excludes lakes, ponds, glaciers > 1 km^{2} (0.386 sq mi or 247 acres) and river estuaries.

La Chapelle-Fortin (French pronunciation: [la ʃapɛl fɔʁtɛ̃]) is a commune in the Eure-et-Loir department in northern France.

== Geography ==
The Commune along with another 70 communes shares part of a 47,681 hectare, Natura 2000 conservation area, called the Forêts et étangs du Perche.

== Population ==
Historical population
Year	Pop.	±% p.a.
1968	206	—
1975	171	−2.63%
1982	163	−0.68%
1990	139	−1.97%
1999	159	+1.50%
2007	171	+0.91%
2012	188	+1.91%
2017	189	+0.11%
2023	167	−2.04%
Source: INSEE

== See also ==
- Communes of the Eure-et-Loir department
