= Beauche =

- Commune
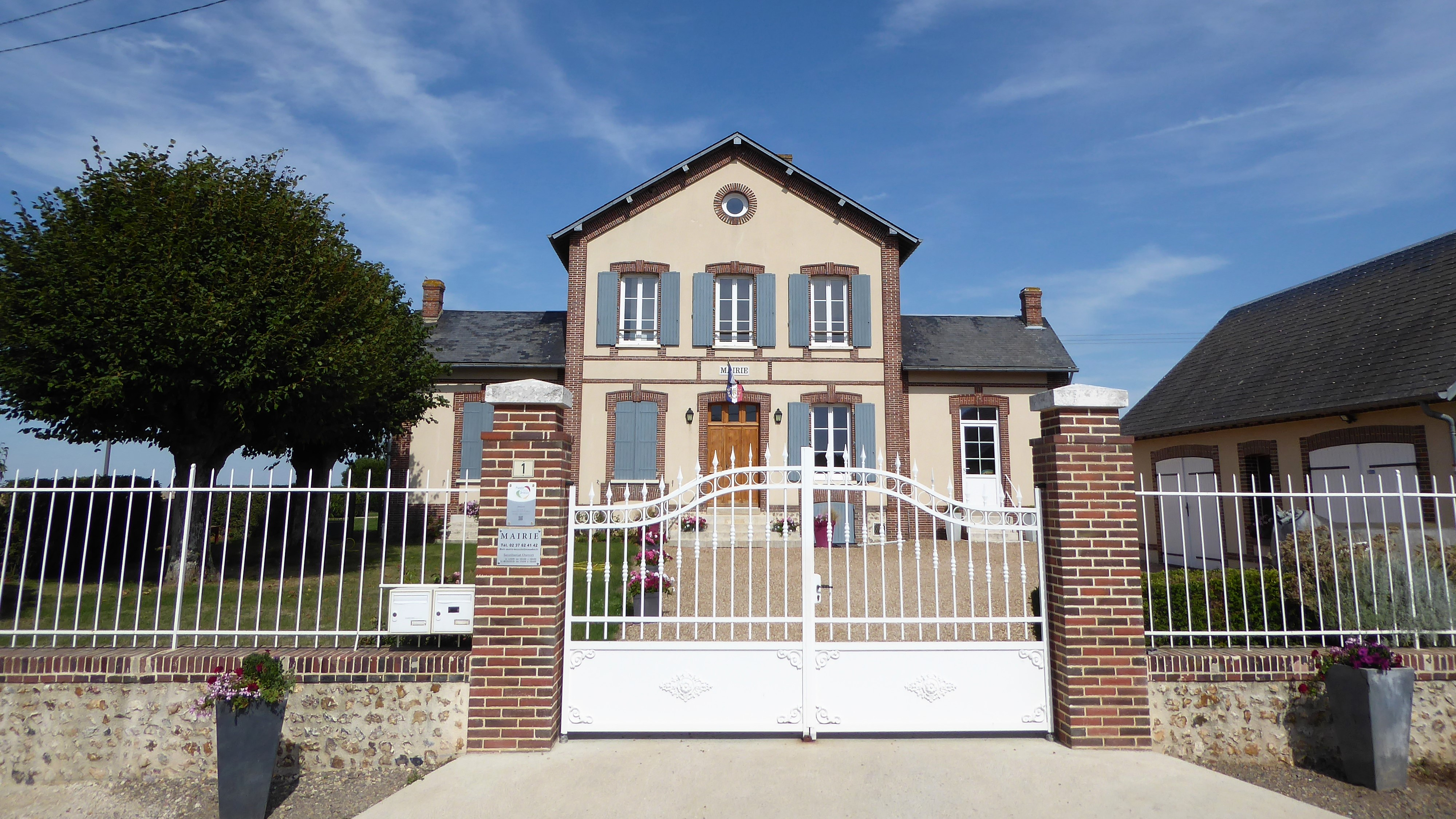
- Town hall

- Coat of arms
- Location of Beauche
- Location within France Location within Centre-Val de Loire
- Coordinates: 48°41′08″N 0°58′00″E
- Country: France
- Region: Centre-Val de Loire
- Department: Eure-et-Loir
- Arrondissement: Dreux
- Canton: Saint-Lubin-des-Joncherets
- Intercommunality: CA Pays de Dreux

Government
  - Mayor (2020–2026): Myriam Galko
- Area^{1}: 16.6 km^{2} (6.4 sq mi)
- Elevation: 180 m (590 ft)
- Highest elevation: 208 m (682 ft)
- Lowest elevation: 168 m (551 ft)
- Population (2023): 279
  - Density: 16.8/km^{2} (43.5/sq mi)
- Time zone: UTC+01:00 (CET)
  - Summer (DST): UTC+02:00 (CEST)
- INSEE/Postal code: 28030 /28270
- ^{1} French Land Register data, which excludes lakes, ponds, glaciers > 1 km^{2} (0.386 sq mi or 247 acres) and river estuaries.

Beauche (French pronunciation: [boʃ]) is a commune in the Eure-et-Loir department in northern France.

== Demography ==
Historical population
Year	Pop.	±% p.a.
1968	183	—
1975	155	−2.34%
1982	211	+4.50%
1990	284	+3.78%
1999	310	+0.98%
2007	302	−0.33%
2012	285	−1.15%
2017	274	−0.78%
2023	279	+0.30%
Source: INSEE

== See also ==
- Communes of the Eure-et-Loir department
