= Revercourt =

- Commune
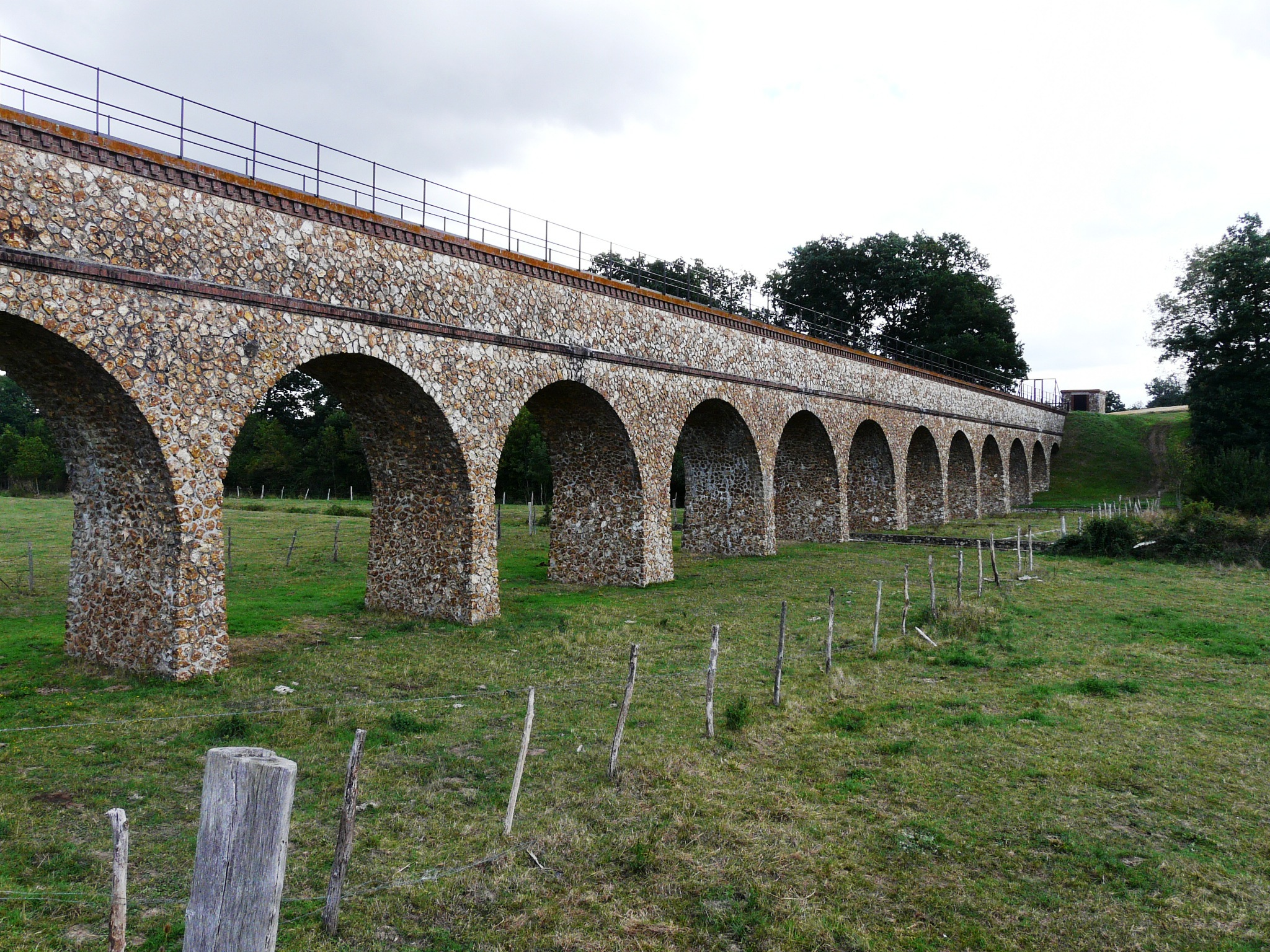
- The Avre aqueduct in Revercourt
- Location of Revercourt
- Location within France Location within Centre-Val de Loire
- Coordinates: 48°43′20″N 1°05′07″E
- Country: France
- Region: Centre-Val de Loire
- Department: Eure-et-Loir
- Arrondissement: Dreux
- Canton: Saint-Lubin-des-Joncherets
- Intercommunality: CA Pays de Dreux

Government
  - Mayor (2020–2026): Benoît Lucas
- Area^{1}: 5.53 km^{2} (2.14 sq mi)
- Elevation: 159 m (522 ft)
- Highest elevation: 180 m (590 ft)
- Lowest elevation: 132 m (433 ft)
- Population (2023): 26
  - Density: 4.7/km^{2} (12/sq mi)
- Time zone: UTC+01:00 (CET)
  - Summer (DST): UTC+02:00 (CEST)
- INSEE/Postal code: 28315 /28270
- ^{1} French Land Register data, which excludes lakes, ponds, glaciers > 1 km^{2} (0.386 sq mi or 247 acres) and river estuaries.

Revercourt (French pronunciation: [ʁəvɛʁkuʁ]) is a commune in the Eure-et-Loir department in northern France.

== Population ==
Historical population
Year	Pop.	±% p.a.
1968	24	—
1975	39	+7.18%
1982	22	−7.85%
1990	33	+5.20%
1999	44	+3.25%
2007	36	−2.48%
2012	23	−8.57%
2017	23	+0.00%
2023	26	+2.06%
Source: INSEE

== See also ==
- Communes of the Eure-et-Loir department
