= Rueil-la-Gadelière =

- Commune
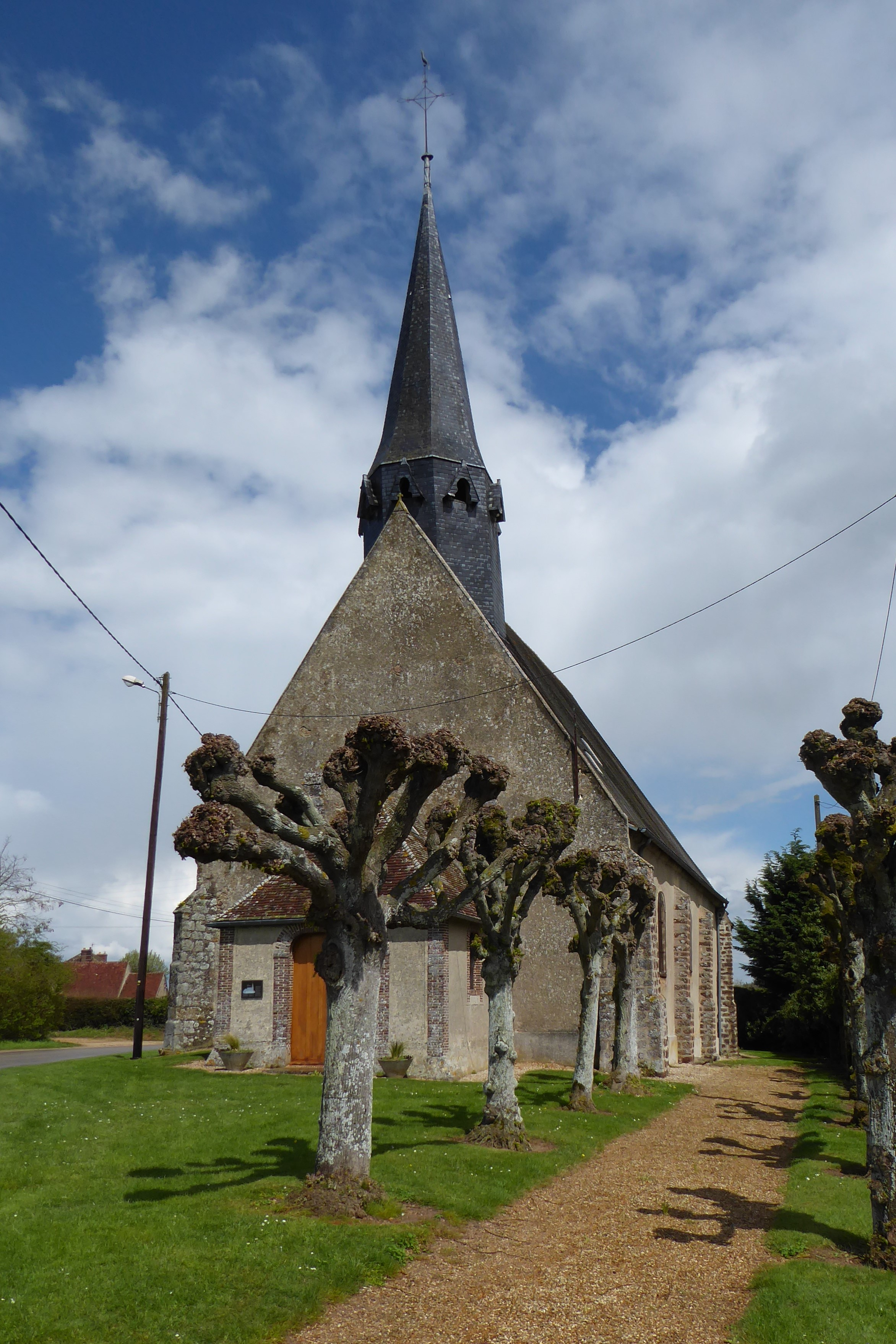
- The church in Rueil-la-Gadelière
- Location of Rueil-la-Gadelière
- Location within France Location within Centre-Val de Loire
- Coordinates: 48°42′56″N 0°58′38″E
- Country: France
- Region: Centre-Val de Loire
- Department: Eure-et-Loir
- Arrondissement: Dreux
- Canton: Saint-Lubin-des-Joncherets
- Intercommunality: CA Pays de Dreux

Government
  - Mayor (2023–2026): Jean-Louis Godefroy
- Area^{1}: 18.44 km^{2} (7.12 sq mi)
- Elevation: 170 m (560 ft)
- Highest elevation: 192 m (630 ft)
- Lowest elevation: 147 m (482 ft)
- Population (2023): 465
  - Density: 25.2/km^{2} (65.3/sq mi)
- Time zone: UTC+01:00 (CET)
  - Summer (DST): UTC+02:00 (CEST)
- INSEE/Postal code: 28322 /28270
- ^{1} French Land Register data, which excludes lakes, ponds, glaciers > 1 km^{2} (0.386 sq mi or 247 acres) and river estuaries.

Rueil-la-Gadelière (French pronunciation: [ʁɥɛj la ɡadəljɛʁ]) is a commune in the Eure-et-Loir department in northern France.

== Population ==
Historical population
Year	Pop.	±% p.a.
1968	311	—
1975	305	−0.28%
1982	406	+4.17%
1990	455	+1.43%
1999	476	+0.50%
2007	457	−0.51%
2012	529	+2.97%
2017	507	−0.85%
2023	465	−1.43%
Source: INSEE

== See also ==
- Communes of the Eure-et-Loir department
