= Saint-Ange-et-Torçay =

- Commune
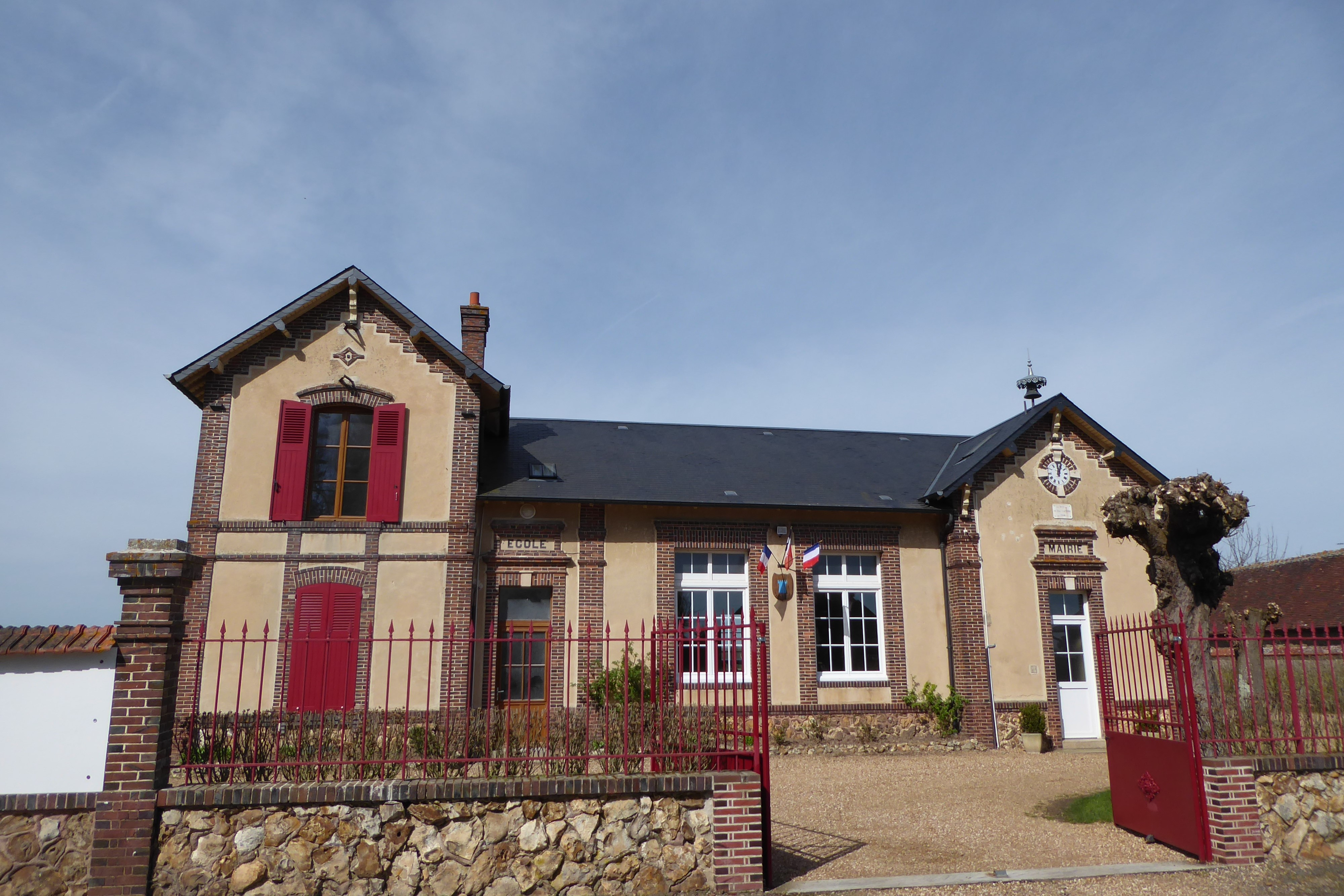
- The town hall and school in Saint-Ange-et-Torçay

- Coat of arms
- Location of Saint-Ange-et-Torçay
- Location within France Location within Centre-Val de Loire
- Coordinates: 48°38′18″N 1°13′34″E
- Country: France
- Region: Centre-Val de Loire
- Department: Eure-et-Loir
- Arrondissement: Dreux
- Canton: Saint-Lubin-des-Joncherets
- Intercommunality: CA Pays de Dreux

Government
  - Mayor (2020–2026): Dominique Lubow
- Area^{1}: 16.61 km^{2} (6.41 sq mi)
- Elevation: 160 m (520 ft)
- Highest elevation: 180 m (590 ft)
- Lowest elevation: 125 m (410 ft)
- Population (2023): 284
  - Density: 17.1/km^{2} (44.3/sq mi)
- Time zone: UTC+01:00 (CET)
  - Summer (DST): UTC+02:00 (CEST)
- INSEE/Postal code: 28323 /28170
- ^{1} French Land Register data, which excludes lakes, ponds, glaciers > 1 km^{2} (0.386 sq mi or 247 acres) and river estuaries.

Saint-Ange-et-Torçay (French pronunciation: [sɛ̃.t‿ɑ̃ʒ e tɔʁsɛ]) is a commune in the Eure-et-Loir department in northern France.

== Geography ==
The Commune along with another 70 communes shares part of a 47,681 hectare, Natura 2000 conservation area, called the Forêts et étangs du Perche.

== Population ==
Historical population
Year	Pop.	±% p.a.
1968	219	—
1975	210	−0.60%
1982	224	+0.93%
1990	243	+1.02%
1999	277	+1.47%
2007	277	+0.00%
2012	285	+0.57%
2017	287	+0.14%
2023	284	−0.17%
Source: INSEE

== See also ==
- Communes of the Eure-et-Loir department
