= La Mancelière =

- Commune
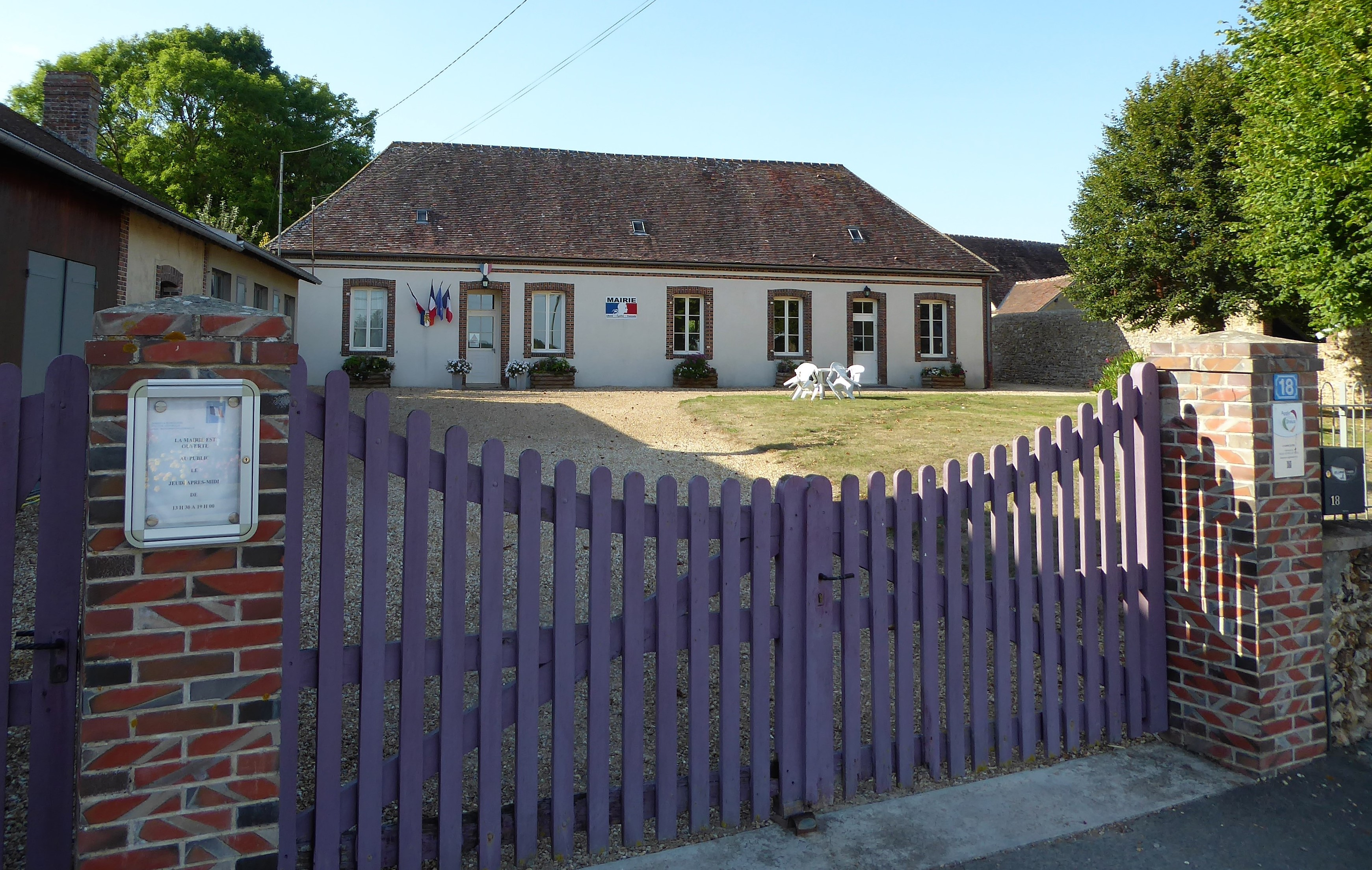
- Town hall
- Location of La Mancelière
- Location within France Location within Centre-Val de Loire
- Coordinates: 48°38′55″N 0°59′45″E
- Country: France
- Region: Centre-Val de Loire
- Department: Eure-et-Loir
- Arrondissement: Dreux
- Canton: Saint-Lubin-des-Joncherets
- Intercommunality: CA Pays de Dreux

Government
  - Mayor (2020–2026): Rachel Sapin
- Area^{1}: 5.9 km^{2} (2.3 sq mi)
- Elevation: 224 m (735 ft)
- Highest elevation: 212 m (696 ft)
- Lowest elevation: 179 m (587 ft)
- Population (2023): 150
  - Density: 25/km^{2} (66/sq mi)
- Time zone: UTC+01:00 (CET)
  - Summer (DST): UTC+02:00 (CEST)
- INSEE/Postal code: 28231 /28270
- ^{1} French Land Register data, which excludes lakes, ponds, glaciers > 1 km^{2} (0.386 sq mi or 247 acres) and river estuaries.

La Mancelière (French pronunciation: [la mɑ̃s(ə)ljɛʁ]) is a commune in the Eure-et-Loir department and Centre-Val de Loire region of north-central France. It lies 44 km north-west of Chartres, 30 km west-south-west of Dreux, and some 105 km from Paris.

== Geography ==
The Commune along with another 70 communes shares part of a 47,681 hectare, Natura 2000 conservation area, called the Forêts et étangs du Perche.

== Population ==
Historical population
Year	Pop.	±% p.a.
1968	127	—
1975	102	−3.08%
1982	117	+1.98%
1990	134	+1.71%
1999	142	+0.65%
2007	158	+1.34%
2012	214	+6.26%
2017	187	−2.66%
2023	150	−3.61%
Source: INSEE

== See also ==
- Communes of the Eure-et-Loir department
