= Canton of Saint-Lubin-des-Joncherets =

Coordinates: 48.76°N 1.19°E

The canton of Saint-Lubin-des-Joncherets is an administrative division of the Eure-et-Loir department, northern France. It was created at the French canton reorganisation which came into effect in March 2015. Its seat is in Saint-Lubin-des-Joncherets.

It consists of the following communes:

1. Ardelles
2. Beauche
3. Bérou-la-Mulotière
4. Boissy-lès-Perche
5. Le Boullay-les-Deux-Églises
6. Brezolles
7. La Chapelle-Fortin
8. Châtaincourt
9. Châteauneuf-en-Thymerais
10. Les Châtelets
11. Crucey-Villages
12. Dampierre-sur-Avre
13. Digny
14. Escorpain
15. Favières
16. La Ferté-Vidame
17. Fessanvilliers-Mattanvilliers
18. Fontaine-les-Ribouts
19. La Framboisière
20. Jaudrais
21. Lamblore
22. Laons
23. Louvilliers-lès-Perche
24. Maillebois
25. La Mancelière
26. Le Mesnil-Thomas
27. Montigny-sur-Avre
28. Morvilliers
29. Prudemanche
30. La Puisaye
31. Puiseux
32. Les Ressuintes
33. Revercourt
34. Rohaire
35. Rueil-la-Gadelière
36. Saint-Ange-et-Torçay
37. Saint-Jean-de-Rebervilliers
38. Saint-Lubin-de-Cravant
39. Saint-Lubin-des-Joncherets
40. Saint-Maixme-Hauterive
41. Saint-Rémy-sur-Avre
42. Saint-Sauveur-Marville
43. La Saucelle
44. Senonches
45. Serazereux
46. Thimert-Gâtelles
47. Tremblay-les-Villages
