= Fontaine-les-Ribouts =

- Commune
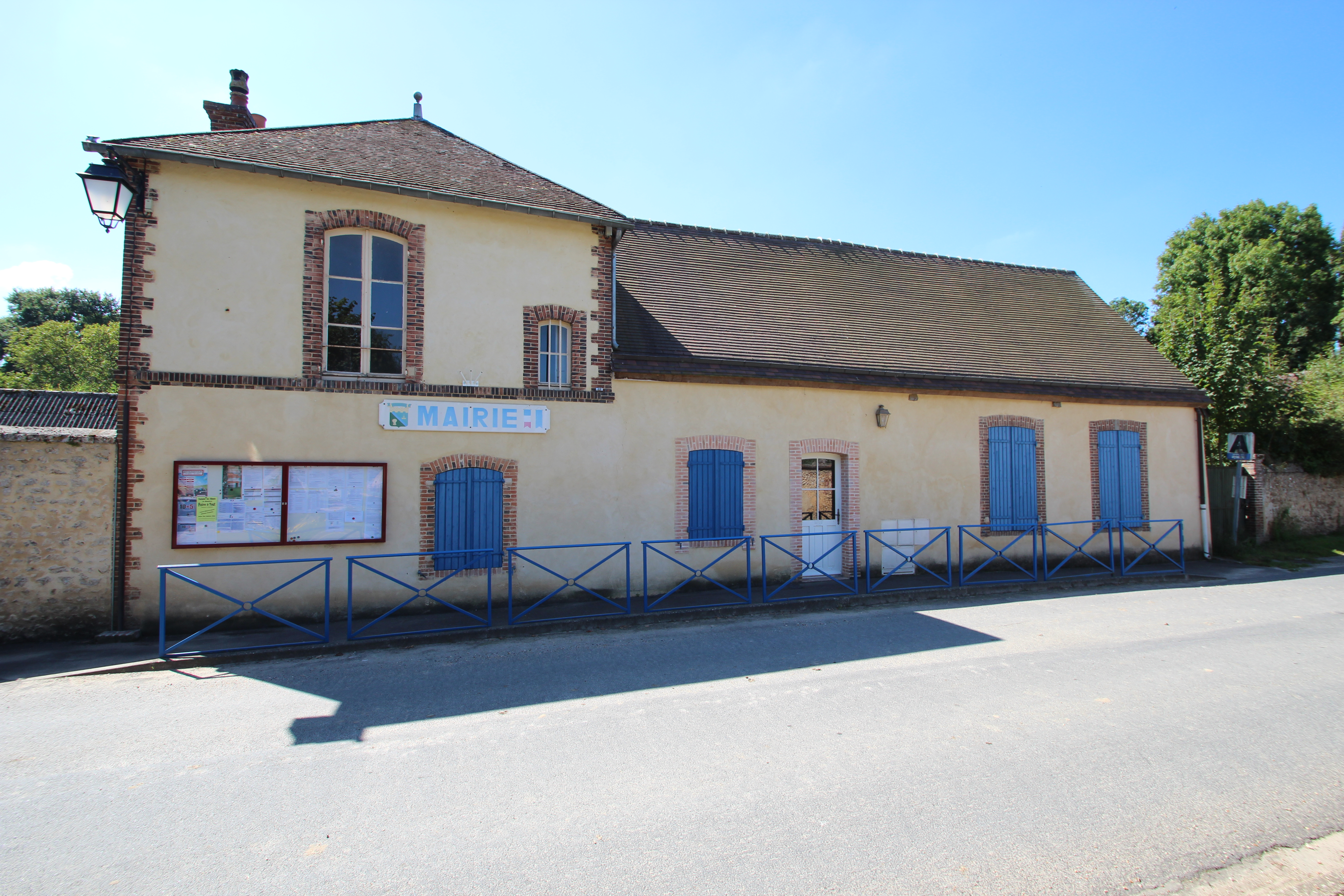
- The town hall in Fontaine-les-Ribouts
- Location of Fontaine-les-Ribouts
- Location within France Location within Centre-Val de Loire
- Coordinates: 48°39′15″N 1°15′23″E
- Country: France
- Region: Centre-Val de Loire
- Department: Eure-et-Loir
- Arrondissement: Dreux
- Canton: Saint-Lubin-des-Joncherets
- Intercommunality: CA Pays de Dreux

Government
  - Mayor (2020–2026): Emmanuelle Bonhomme
- Area^{1}: 7.12 km^{2} (2.75 sq mi)
- Highest elevation: 174 m (571 ft)
- Lowest elevation: 120 m (390 ft)
- Population (2023): 186
  - Density: 26.1/km^{2} (67.7/sq mi)
- Time zone: UTC+01:00 (CET)
  - Summer (DST): UTC+02:00 (CEST)
- INSEE/Postal code: 28155 /28170
- ^{1} French Land Register data, which excludes lakes, ponds, glaciers > 1 km^{2} (0.386 sq mi or 247 acres) and river estuaries.

Fontaine-les-Ribouts (French pronunciation: [fɔ̃tɛn le ʁibu]) is a commune in the Eure-et-Loir department in northern France.

== Geography ==
The Commune along with another 70 communes shares part of a 47,681 hectare, Natura 2000 conservation area, called the Forêts et étangs du Perche.

== Population ==
Historical population
Year	Pop.	±% p.a.
1968	122	—
1975	150	+3.00%
1982	142	−0.78%
1990	201	+4.44%
1999	209	+0.43%
2007	236	+1.53%
2012	232	−0.34%
2017	208	−2.16%
2023	186	−1.85%
Source: INSEE

== See also ==
- Communes of the Eure-et-Loir department
