= Serazereux =

- Commune
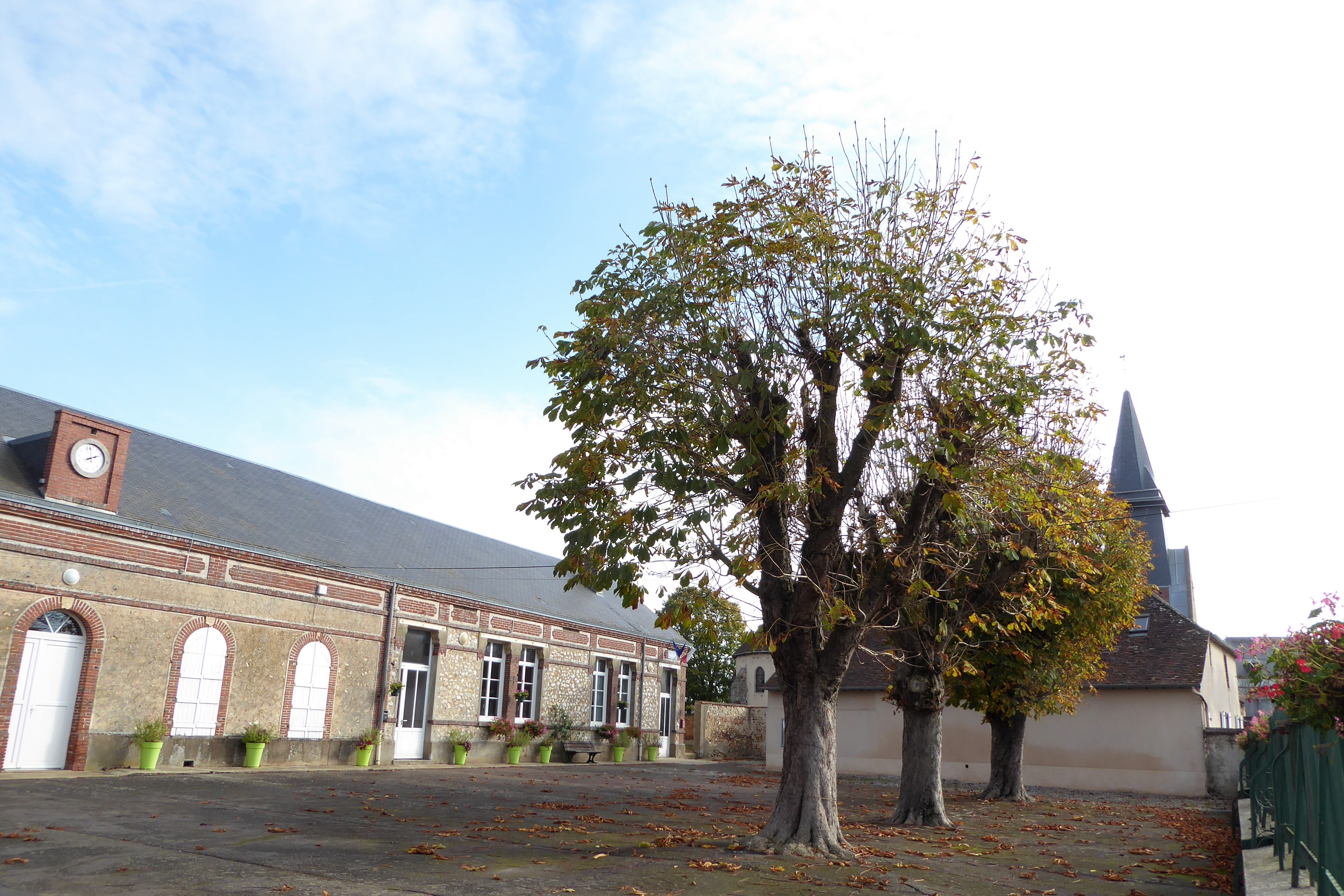
- The town hall in Serazereux
- Location of Serazereux
- Location within France Location within Centre-Val de Loire
- Coordinates: 48°35′57″N 1°26′07″E
- Country: France
- Region: Centre-Val de Loire
- Department: Eure-et-Loir
- Arrondissement: Dreux
- Canton: Saint-Lubin-des-Joncherets
- Intercommunality: CA Pays de Dreux

Government
  - Mayor (2022–2026): Thomas Lange
- Area^{1}: 15.58 km^{2} (6.02 sq mi)
- Elevation: 186 m (610 ft)
- Highest elevation: 193 m (633 ft)
- Lowest elevation: 140 m (460 ft)
- Population (2023): 536
  - Density: 34.4/km^{2} (89.1/sq mi)
- Time zone: UTC+01:00 (CET)
  - Summer (DST): UTC+02:00 (CEST)
- INSEE/Postal code: 28374 /28170
- ^{1} French Land Register data, which excludes lakes, ponds, glaciers > 1 km^{2} (0.386 sq mi or 247 acres) and river estuaries.

Serazereux (French pronunciation: [səʁazʁø]) is a commune in the Eure-et-Loir department in northern France.

== Population ==
Historical population
Year	Pop.	±% p.a.
1968	271	—
1975	279	+0.42%
1982	298	+0.95%
1990	421	+4.41%
1999	436	+0.39%
2007	477	+1.13%
2012	567	+3.52%
2017	546	−0.75%
2023	536	−0.31%
Source: INSEE

== See also ==
- Communes of the Eure-et-Loir department
