= Prudemanche =

- Commune
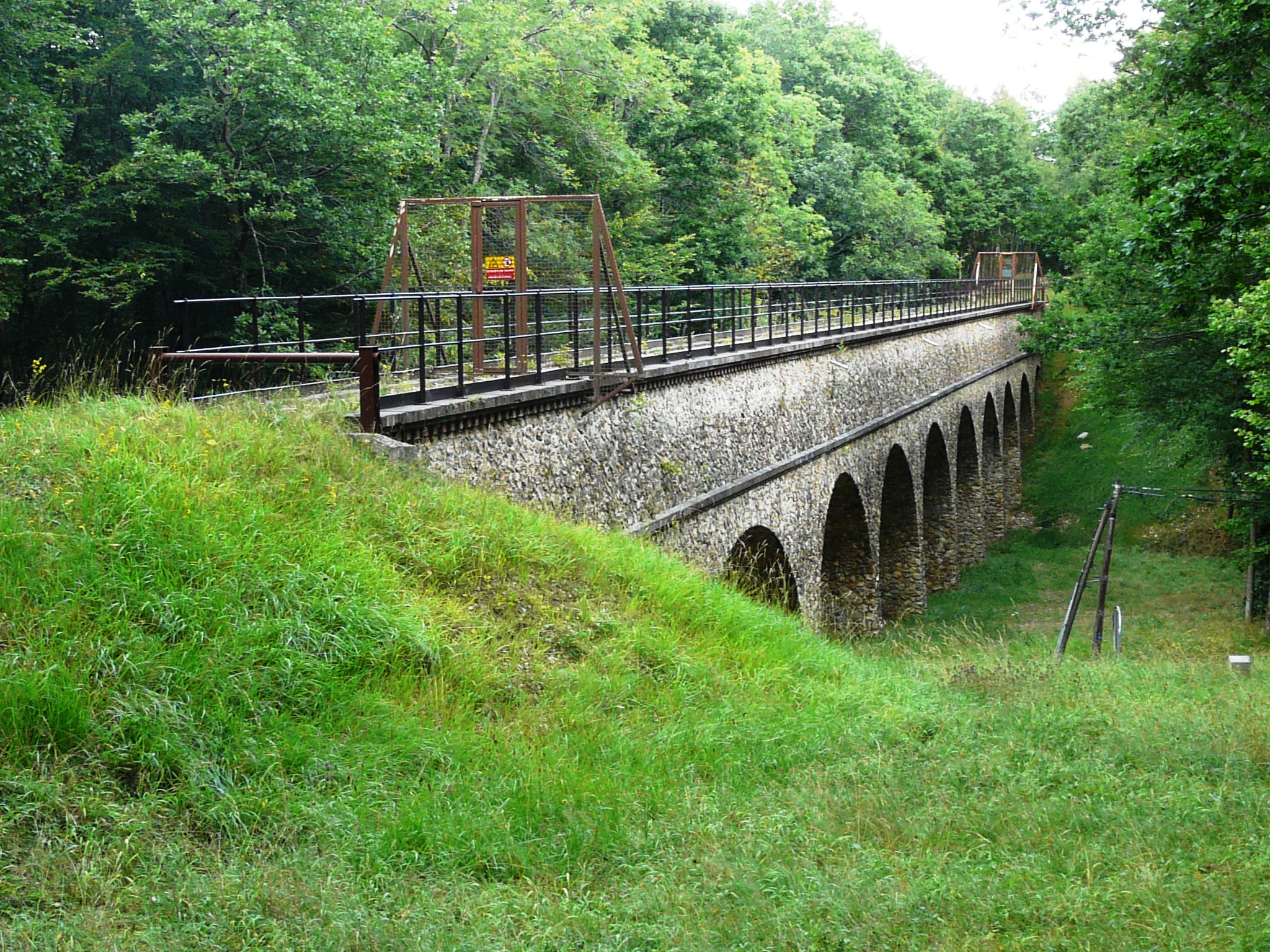
- The Avre aqueduct in Prudemanche
- Location of Prudemanche
- Location within France Location within Centre-Val de Loire
- Coordinates: 48°43′01″N 1°08′14″E
- Country: France
- Region: Centre-Val de Loire
- Department: Eure-et-Loir
- Arrondissement: Dreux
- Canton: Saint-Lubin-des-Joncherets
- Intercommunality: CA Pays de Dreux

Government
  - Mayor (2020–2026): Christophe Besnard
- Area^{1}: 15.43 km^{2} (5.96 sq mi)
- Elevation: 180 m (590 ft)
- Highest elevation: 184 m (604 ft)
- Lowest elevation: 122 m (400 ft)
- Population (2023): 262
  - Density: 17.0/km^{2} (44.0/sq mi)
- Time zone: UTC+01:00 (CET)
  - Summer (DST): UTC+02:00 (CEST)
- INSEE/Postal code: 28308 /28270
- ^{1} French Land Register data, which excludes lakes, ponds, glaciers > 1 km^{2} (0.386 sq mi or 247 acres) and river estuaries.

Prudemanche (French pronunciation: [pʁydmɑ̃ʃ]) is a commune in the Eure-et-Loir department in northern France.

== Population ==
Historical population
Year	Pop.	±% p.a.
1968	118	—
1975	119	+0.12%
1982	112	−0.86%
1990	150	+3.72%
1999	196	+3.02%
2007	257	+3.45%
2012	256	−0.08%
2017	256	+0.00%
2023	262	+0.39%
Source: INSEE

== See also ==
- Communes of the Eure-et-Loir department
