= Favières, Eure-et-Loir =

Favières
- Commune
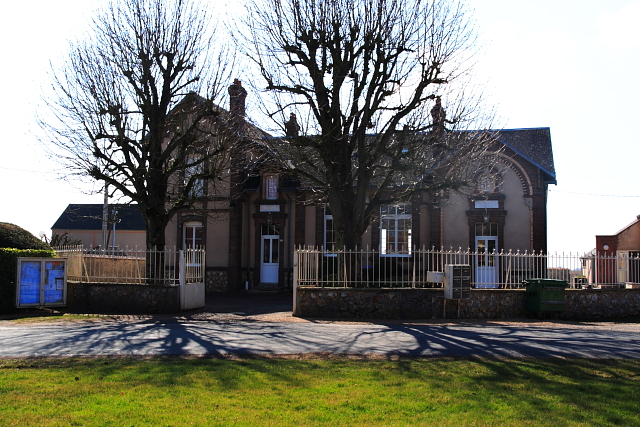
- The town hall in Favières
- Location of Favières
- Location within France Location within Centre-Val de Loire
- Coordinates: 48°31′50″N 1°13′44″E
- Country: France
- Region: Centre-Val de Loire
- Department: Eure-et-Loir
- Arrondissement: Dreux
- Canton: Saint-Lubin-des-Joncherets
- Intercommunality: CA Pays de Dreux

Government
  - Mayor (2020–2026): Frédéric Giowachini
- Area^{1}: 12.69 km^{2} (4.90 sq mi)
- Elevation: 250 m (820 ft)
- Highest elevation: 256 m (840 ft)
- Lowest elevation: 206 m (676 ft)
- Population (2023): 637
  - Density: 50.2/km^{2} (130/sq mi)
- Time zone: UTC+01:00 (CET)
  - Summer (DST): UTC+02:00 (CEST)
- INSEE/Postal code: 28147 /28170
- ^{1} French Land Register data, which excludes lakes, ponds, glaciers > 1 km^{2} (0.386 sq mi or 247 acres) and river estuaries.

Favières (French pronunciation: [favjɛʁ]) is a commune in the Eure-et-Loir department in northern France.

== Population ==
Historical population
Year	Pop.	±% p.a.
1968	186	—
1975	196	+0.75%
1982	321	+7.30%
1990	362	+1.51%
1999	414	+1.50%
2007	481	+1.89%
2012	564	+3.23%
2017	595	+1.08%
2023	637	+1.14%
Source: INSEE

== See also ==
- Communes of the Eure-et-Loir department
