= Fessanvilliers-Mattanvilliers =

- Commune
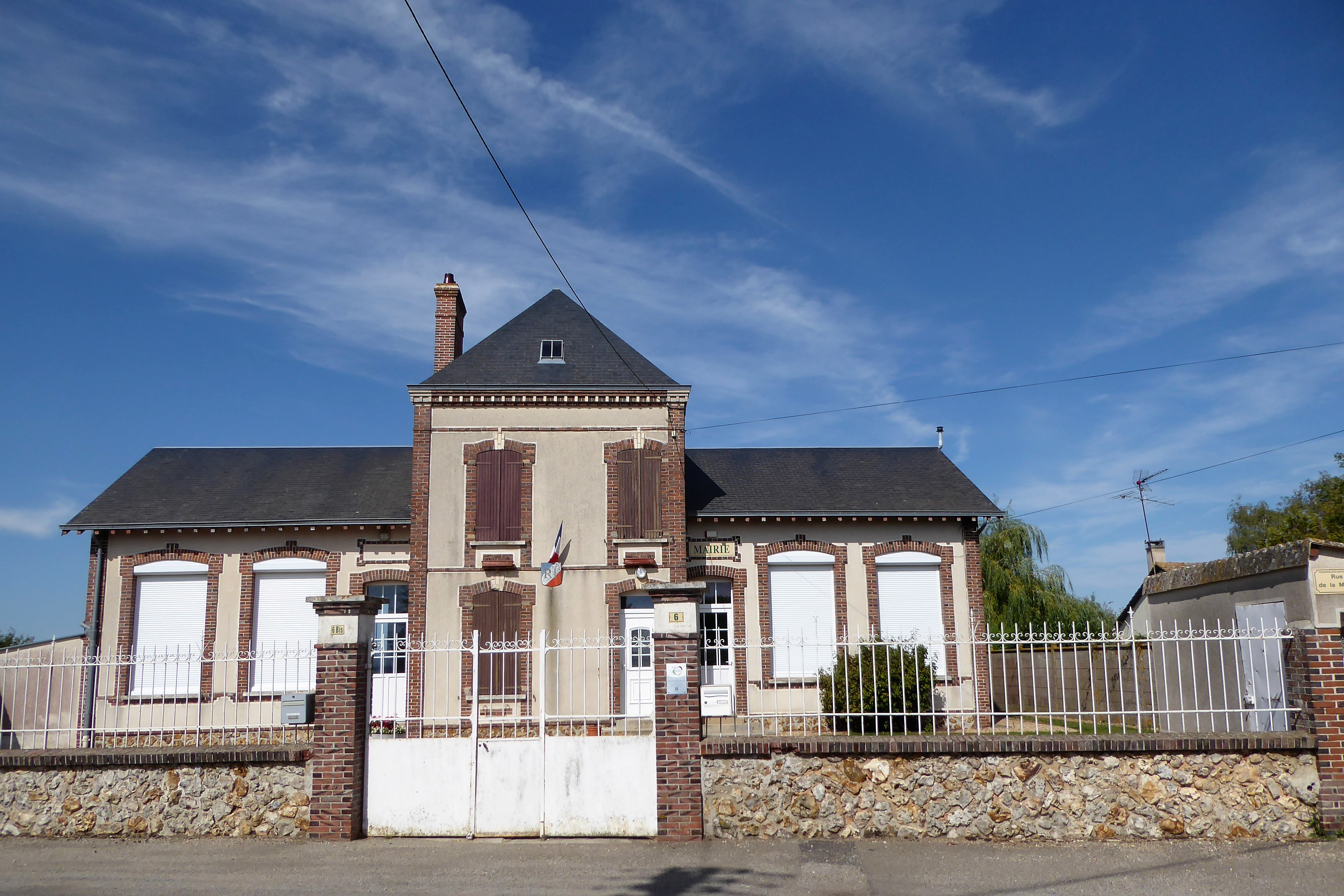
- Town hall
- Location of Fessanvilliers-Mattanvilliers
- Location within France Location within Centre-Val de Loire
- Coordinates: 48°42′47″N 1°02′50″E
- Country: France
- Region: Centre-Val de Loire
- Department: Eure-et-Loir
- Arrondissement: Dreux
- Canton: Saint-Lubin-des-Joncherets
- Intercommunality: CA Pays de Dreux

Government
  - Mayor (2020–2026): Eric Depuydt
- Area^{1}: 11.63 km^{2} (4.49 sq mi)
- Elevation: 174 m (571 ft)
- Highest elevation: 188 m (617 ft)
- Lowest elevation: 159 m (522 ft)
- Population (2023): 168
  - Density: 14.4/km^{2} (37.4/sq mi)
- Time zone: UTC+01:00 (CET)
  - Summer (DST): UTC+02:00 (CEST)
- INSEE/Postal code: 28151 /28270
- ^{1} French Land Register data, which excludes lakes, ponds, glaciers > 1 km^{2} (0.386 sq mi or 247 acres) and river estuaries.

Fessanvilliers-Mattanvilliers (French pronunciation: [fɛsɑ̃vilje matɑ̃vilje]) is a commune in the Eure-et-Loir department in northern France.

== Population ==
Historical population
Year	Pop.	±% p.a.
1968	105	—
1975	111	+0.80%
1982	106	−0.66%
1990	121	+1.67%
1999	137	+1.39%
2007	163	+2.20%
2012	172	+1.08%
2017	176	+0.46%
2023	168	−0.77%
Source: INSEE

== See also ==
- Communes of the Eure-et-Loir department
