= Jaudrais =

- Commune
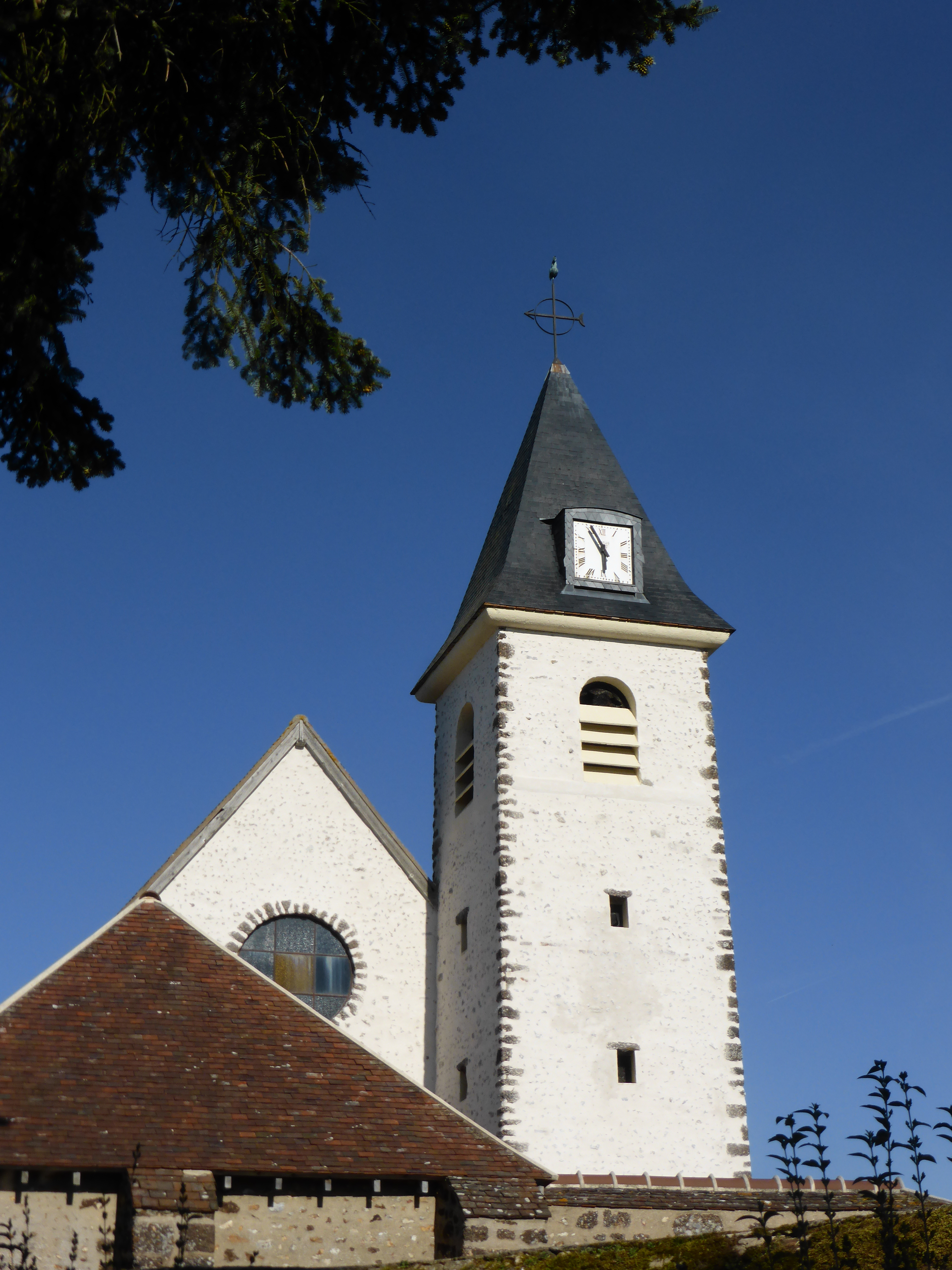
- The church in Jaudrais
- Location of Jaudrais
- Location within France Location within Centre-Val de Loire
- Coordinates: 48°34′42″N 1°07′39″E
- Country: France
- Region: Centre-Val de Loire
- Department: Eure-et-Loir
- Arrondissement: Dreux
- Canton: Saint-Lubin-des-Joncherets

Government
  - Mayor (2020–2026): Francis Dos Reis
- Area^{1}: 15.3 km^{2} (5.9 sq mi)
- Elevation: 190 m (620 ft)
- Highest elevation: 224 m (735 ft)
- Lowest elevation: 165 m (541 ft)
- Population (2023): 396
  - Density: 25.9/km^{2} (67.0/sq mi)
- Time zone: UTC+01:00 (CET)
  - Summer (DST): UTC+02:00 (CEST)
- INSEE/Postal code: 28200 /28250
- ^{1} French Land Register data, which excludes lakes, ponds, glaciers > 1 km^{2} (0.386 sq mi or 247 acres) and river estuaries.

Jaudrais (French pronunciation: [ʒodʁɛ]) is a commune in the Eure-et-Loir department in northern France.

== Geography ==
The Commune along with another 70 communes shares part of a 47,681 hectare, Natura 2000 conservation area, called the Forêts et étangs du Perche.

== Population ==
Historical population
Year	Pop.	±% p.a.
1968	140	—
1975	158	+1.74%
1982	175	+1.47%
1990	184	+0.63%
1999	261	+3.96%
2007	341	+3.40%
2012	367	+1.48%
2017	406	+2.04%
2023	396	−0.41%
Source: INSEE

== See also ==
- Communes of the Eure-et-Loir department
