= Morvilliers, Eure-et-Loir =

Morvilliers
- Commune
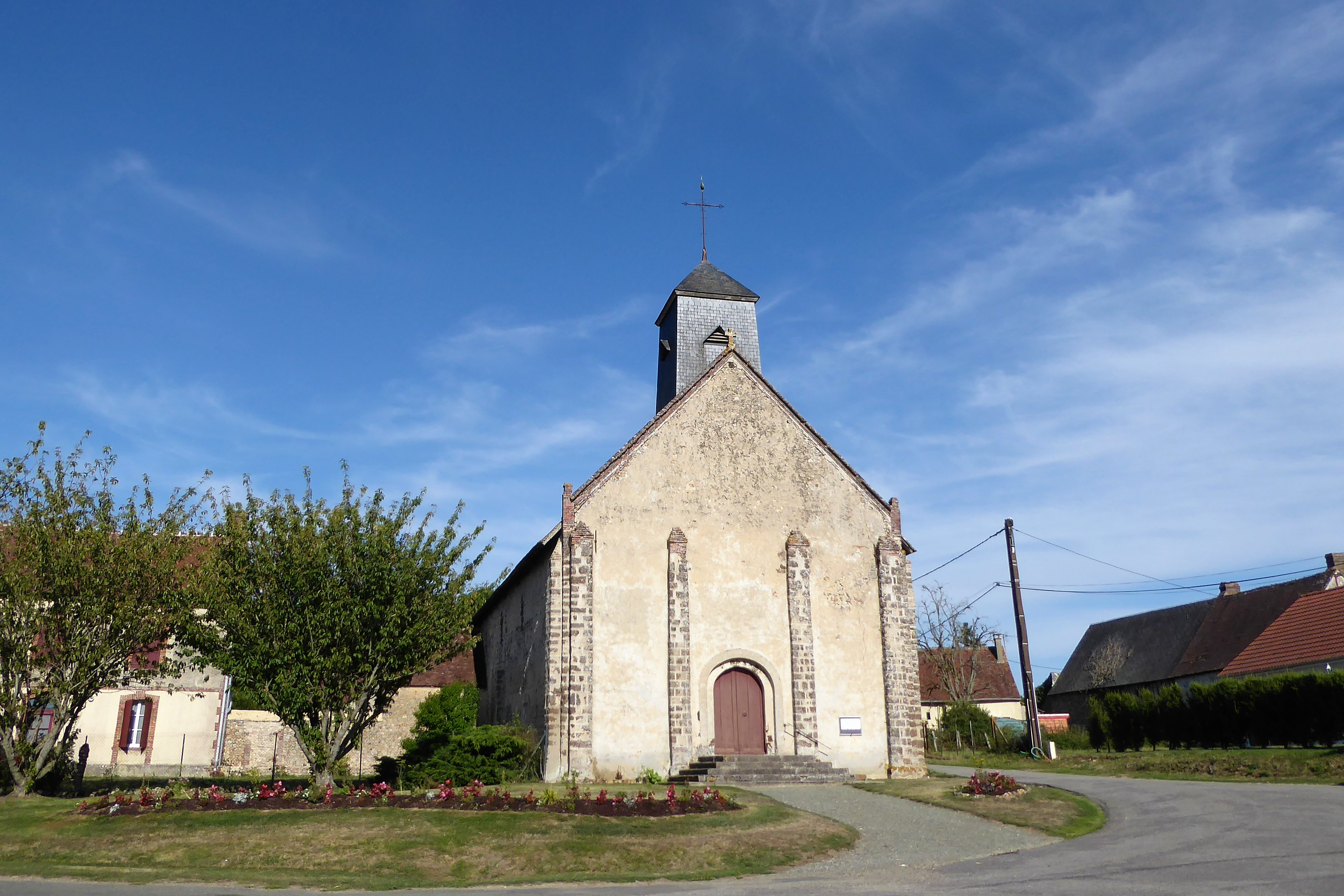
- Location of Morvilliers
- Location within France Location within Centre-Val de Loire
- Coordinates: 48°38′42″N 0°56′15″E
- Country: France
- Region: Centre-Val de Loire
- Department: Eure-et-Loir
- Arrondissement: Dreux
- Canton: Saint-Lubin-des-Joncherets
- Intercommunality: Forêts du Perche

Government
  - Mayor (2020–2026): Bernadette Tremier
- Area^{1}: 9.92 km^{2} (3.83 sq mi)
- Elevation: 220 m (720 ft)
- Highest elevation: 229 m (751 ft)
- Lowest elevation: 180 m (590 ft)
- Population (2023): 137
  - Density: 13.8/km^{2} (35.8/sq mi)
- Time zone: UTC+01:00 (CET)
  - Summer (DST): UTC+02:00 (CEST)
- INSEE/Postal code: 28271 /28340
- ^{1} French Land Register data, which excludes lakes, ponds, glaciers > 1 km^{2} (0.386 sq mi or 247 acres) and river estuaries.

Morvilliers (French pronunciation: [mɔʁvilje]) is a commune in the Eure-et-Loir department in northern France.

== Population ==
Historical population
Year	Pop.	±% p.a.
1968	107	—
1975	105	−0.27%
1982	90	−2.18%
1990	104	+1.82%
1999	129	+2.42%
2007	132	+0.29%
2012	147	+2.18%
2017	152	+0.67%
2023	137	−1.72%
Source: INSEE

== See also ==
- Communes of the Eure-et-Loir department
