= Fontenay-sur-Conie =

- Commune
- Location of Fontenay-sur-Conie
- Location within France Location within Centre-Val de Loire
- Coordinates: 48°09′52″N 1°39′55″E
- Country: France
- Region: Centre-Val de Loire
- Department: Eure-et-Loir
- Arrondissement: Châteaudun
- Canton: Les Villages Vovéens
- Intercommunality: CC Cœur de Beauce

Government
  - Mayor (2020–2026): Jean-Philippe Pothier
- Area^{1}: 13.25 km^{2} (5.12 sq mi)
- Elevation: 122 m (400 ft)
- Highest elevation: 141 m (463 ft)
- Lowest elevation: 117 m (384 ft)
- Population (2023): 150
  - Density: 11/km^{2} (29/sq mi)
- Time zone: UTC+01:00 (CET)
  - Summer (DST): UTC+02:00 (CEST)
- INSEE/Postal code: 28157 /28140
- ^{1} French Land Register data, which excludes lakes, ponds, glaciers > 1 km^{2} (0.386 sq mi or 247 acres) and river estuaries.

Fontenay-sur-Conie (French pronunciation: [fɔ̃tnɛ syʁ kɔni]) is a commune in the Eure-et-Loir department and Centre-Val de Loire region of north-central France. It lies 34 km south-southeast of Chartres and some 90 km south-west of Paris.

== Population ==
Historical population
Year	Pop.	±% p.a.
1968	165	—
1975	129	−3.46%
1982	106	−2.77%
1990	117	+1.24%
1999	110	−0.68%
2007	128	+1.91%
2012	159	+4.43%
2017	128	−4.24%
2023	150	+2.68%
Source: INSEE

== See also ==
- Communes of the Eure-et-Loir department
