= Ouarville =

- Commune
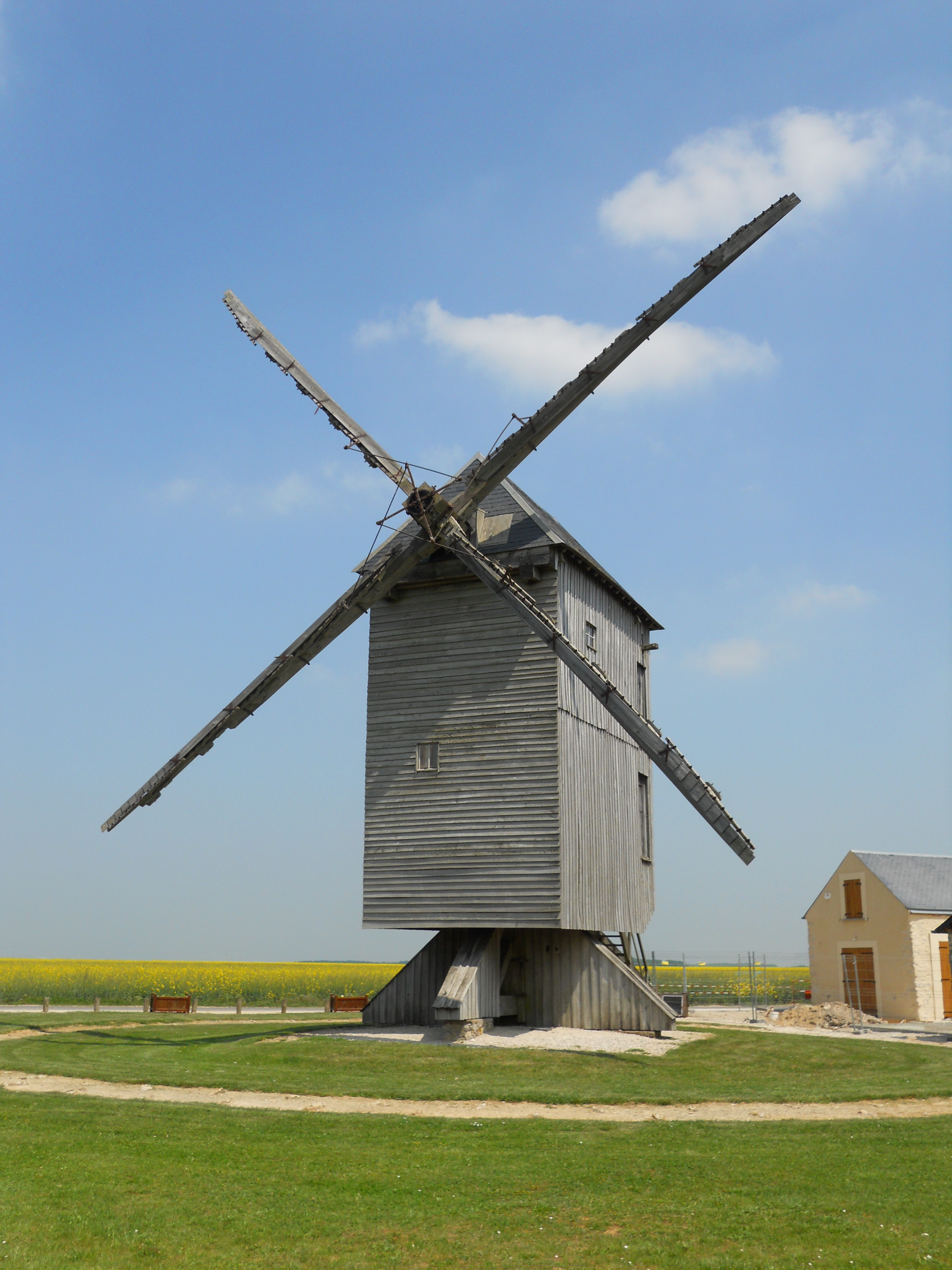
- The windmill in Ouarville

- Coat of arms
- Location of Ouarville
- Location within France Location within Centre-Val de Loire
- Coordinates: 48°21′17″N 1°46′30″E
- Country: France
- Region: Centre-Val de Loire
- Department: Eure-et-Loir
- Arrondissement: Chartres
- Canton: Les Villages Vovéens

Government
  - Mayor (2020–2026): Jean-Michel Dubief
- Area^{1}: 20.13 km^{2} (7.77 sq mi)
- Elevation: 150 m (490 ft)
- Highest elevation: 154 m (505 ft)
- Lowest elevation: 146 m (479 ft)
- Population (2023): 548
  - Density: 27.2/km^{2} (70.5/sq mi)
- Time zone: UTC+01:00 (CET)
  - Summer (DST): UTC+02:00 (CEST)
- INSEE/Postal code: 28291 /28150
- ^{1} French Land Register data, which excludes lakes, ponds, glaciers > 1 km^{2} (0.386 sq mi or 247 acres) and river estuaries.

Ouarville (French pronunciation: [waʁvil]) is a commune in the Eure-et-Loir department in northern France.

== Population ==
Historical population
Year	Pop.	±% p.a.
1968	425	—
1975	408	−0.58%
1982	425	+0.58%
1990	468	+1.21%
1999	549	+1.79%
2007	574	+0.56%
2012	544	−1.07%
2017	524	−0.75%
2023	548	+0.75%
Source: INSEE

== See also ==
- Communes of the Eure-et-Loir department
