= Neuvy-en-Dunois =

- Commune
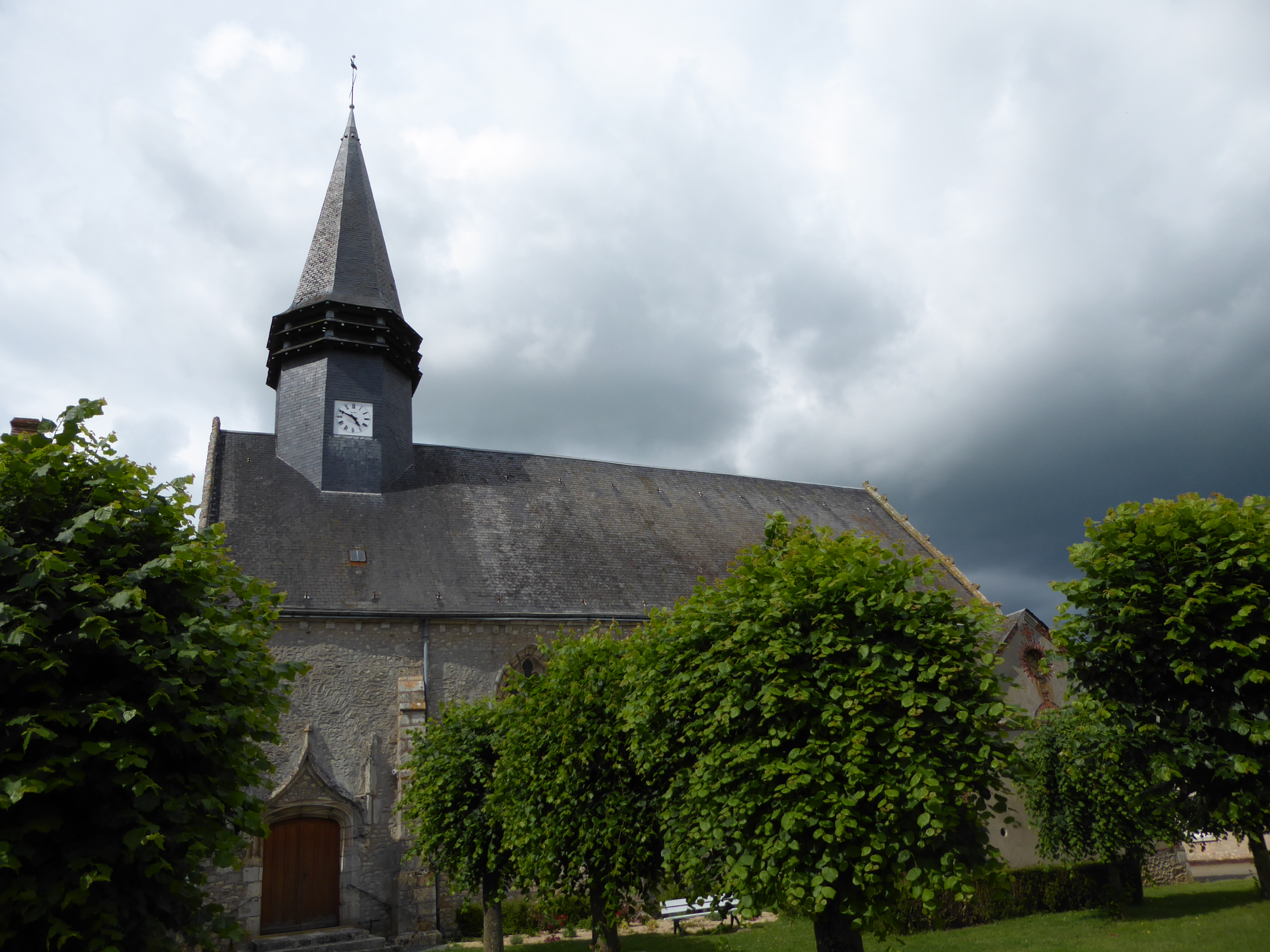
- The church in Neuvy-en-Dunois
- Location of Neuvy-en-Dunois
- Location within France Location within Centre-Val de Loire
- Coordinates: 48°12′28″N 1°32′24″E
- Country: France
- Region: Centre-Val de Loire
- Department: Eure-et-Loir
- Arrondissement: Châteaudun
- Canton: Les Villages Vovéens
- Intercommunality: Bonnevalais

Government
  - Mayor (2020–2026): Denis Goussu
- Area^{1}: 25.87 km^{2} (9.99 sq mi)
- Elevation: 143 m (469 ft)
- Highest elevation: 146 m (479 ft)
- Lowest elevation: 132 m (433 ft)
- Population (2023): 300
  - Density: 12/km^{2} (30/sq mi)
- Time zone: UTC+01:00 (CET)
  - Summer (DST): UTC+02:00 (CEST)
- INSEE/Postal code: 28277 /28800
- ^{1} French Land Register data, which excludes lakes, ponds, glaciers > 1 km^{2} (0.386 sq mi or 247 acres) and river estuaries.

Neuvy-en-Dunois (French pronunciation: [nøvi ɑ̃ dynwa]) is a commune in the Eure-et-Loir department in northern France.

== Population ==
Historical population
Year	Pop.	±% p.a.
1968	398	—
1975	304	−3.78%
1982	259	−2.26%
1990	257	−0.10%
1999	310	+2.11%
2007	316	+0.24%
2012	340	+1.47%
2017	310	−1.83%
2023	300	−0.55%
Source: INSEE

== See also ==
- Communes of the Eure-et-Loir department
