= Sancheville =

- Commune
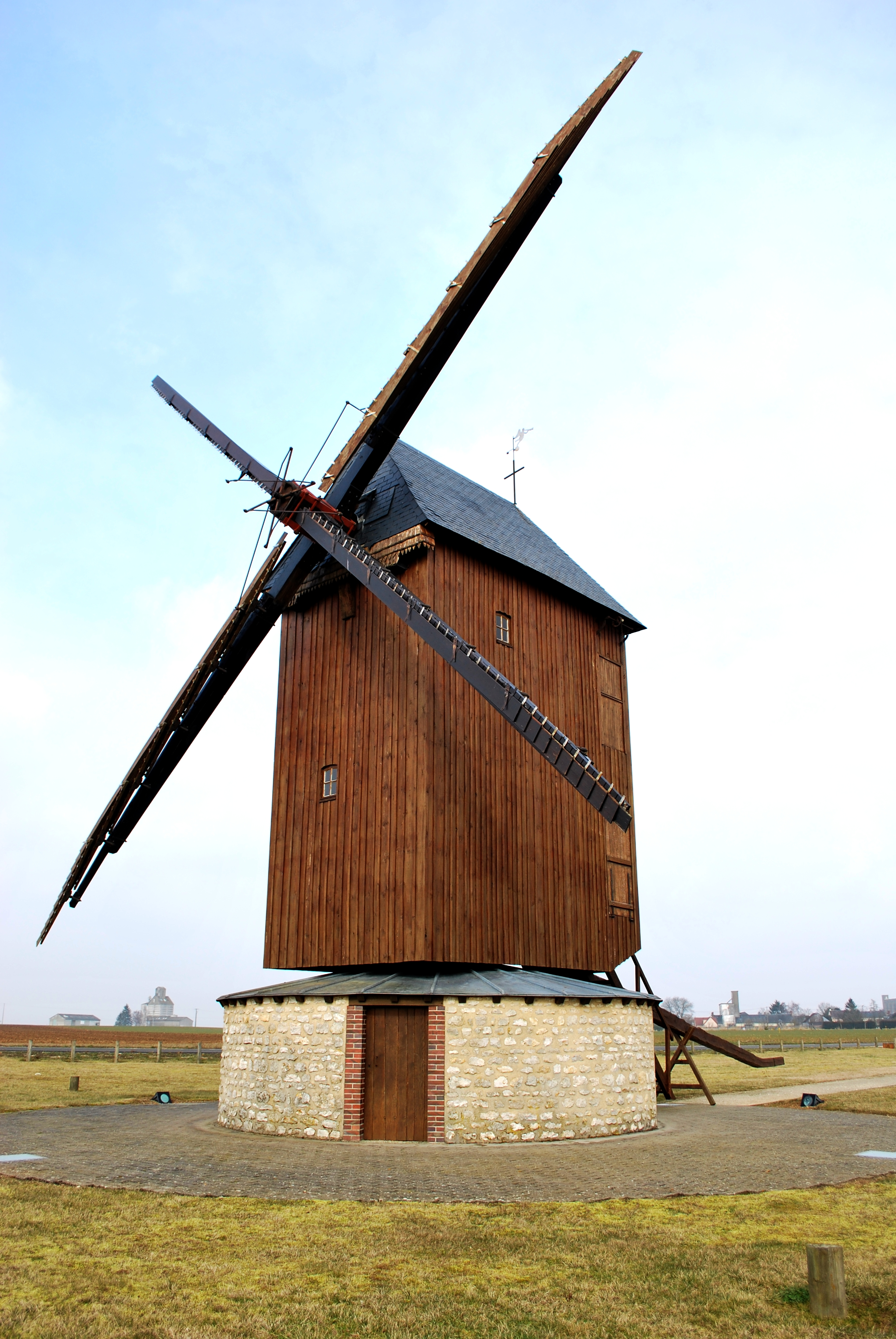
- The windmill in Sancheville
- Location of Sancheville
- Location within France Location within Centre-Val de Loire
- Coordinates: 48°11′33″N 1°34′39″E
- Country: France
- Region: Centre-Val de Loire
- Department: Eure-et-Loir
- Arrondissement: Châteaudun
- Canton: Les Villages Vovéens
- Intercommunality: Bonnevalais

Government
  - Mayor (2020–2026): Jean-Marc Vanneau
- Area^{1}: 21.77 km^{2} (8.41 sq mi)
- Elevation: 153 m (502 ft)
- Highest elevation: 145 m (476 ft)
- Lowest elevation: 124 m (407 ft)
- Population (2023): 742
  - Density: 34.1/km^{2} (88.3/sq mi)
- Time zone: UTC+01:00 (CET)
  - Summer (DST): UTC+02:00 (CEST)
- INSEE/Postal code: 28364 /28800
- ^{1} French Land Register data, which excludes lakes, ponds, glaciers > 1 km^{2} (0.386 sq mi or 247 acres) and river estuaries.

Sancheville (French pronunciation: [sɑ̃ʃvil]) is a commune in the Eure-et-Loir department in northern France.

== Population ==
Historical population
| Year | Pop. | ±% p.a. |
|---|---|---|
| 1968 | 845 | — |
| 1975 | 835 | −0.17% |
| 1982 | 877 | +0.70% |
| 1990 | 755 | −1.85% |
| 1999 | 704 | −0.77% |
| 2007 | 770 | +1.13% |
| 2012 | 824 | +1.36% |
| 2017 | 806 | −0.44% |
| 2023 | 742 | −1.37% |
Source: INSEE

== See also ==
- Communes of the Eure-et-Loir department
