= Péronville =

- Commune
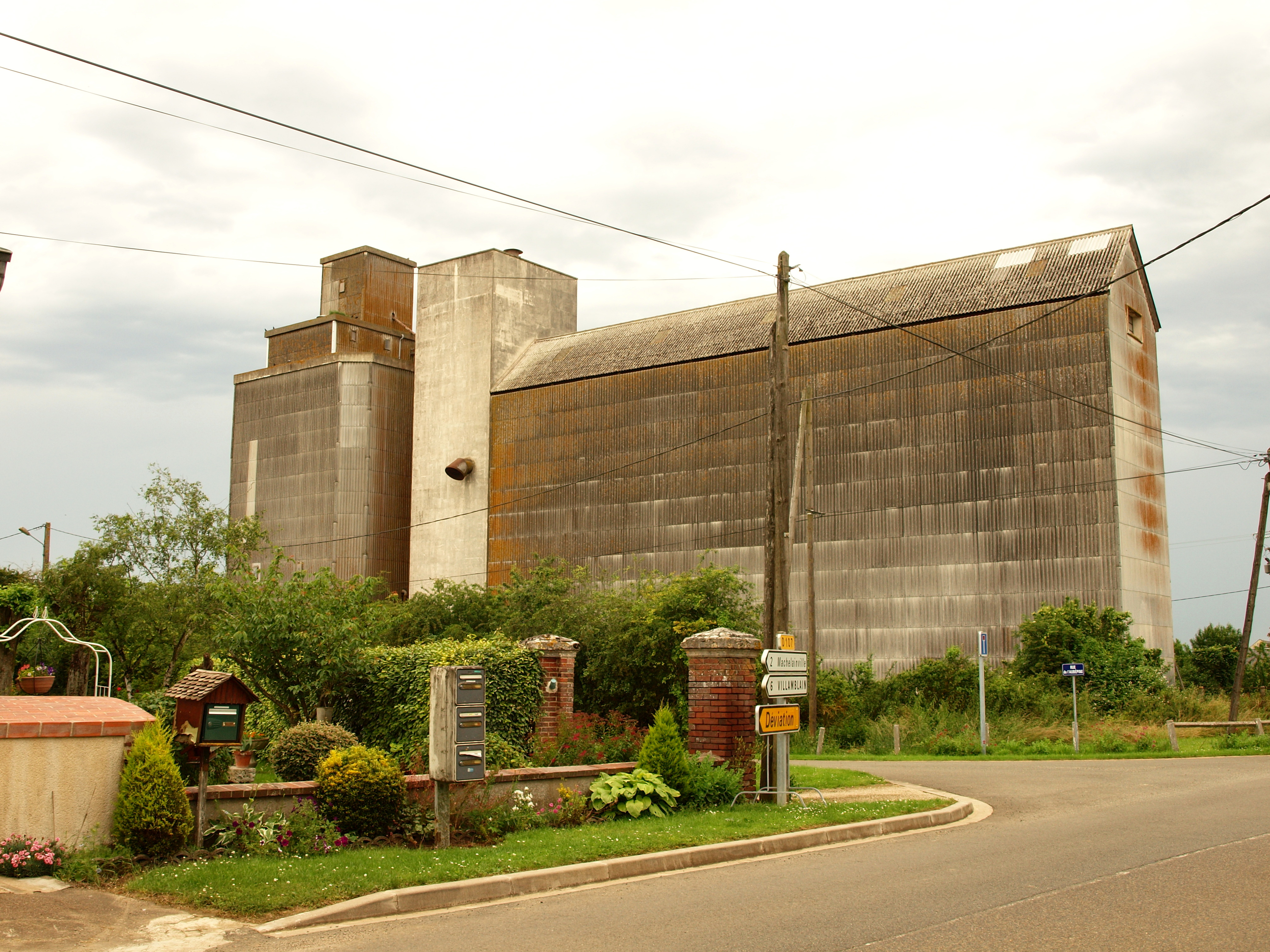
- A grain silo in Péronville
- Location of Péronville
- Location within France Location within Centre-Val de Loire
- Coordinates: 48°03′49″N 1°35′04″E
- Country: France
- Region: Centre-Val de Loire
- Department: Eure-et-Loir
- Arrondissement: Châteaudun
- Canton: Les Villages Vovéens
- Intercommunality: Cœur de Beauce

Government
  - Mayor (2020–2026): Thierry Fallou
- Area^{1}: 24.9 km^{2} (9.6 sq mi)
- Elevation: 214 m (702 ft)
- Highest elevation: 140 m (460 ft)
- Lowest elevation: 112 m (367 ft)
- Population (2023): 254
  - Density: 10.2/km^{2} (26.4/sq mi)
- Time zone: UTC+01:00 (CET)
  - Summer (DST): UTC+02:00 (CEST)
- INSEE/Postal code: 28296 /28140
- ^{1} French Land Register data, which excludes lakes, ponds, glaciers > 1 km^{2} (0.386 sq mi or 247 acres) and river estuaries.

Péronville (French pronunciation: [peʁɔ̃vil]) is a commune in the Eure-et-Loir department in northern France.

== Population ==
Historical population
Year	Pop.	±% p.a.
1968	381	—
1975	272	−4.70%
1982	244	−1.54%
1990	228	−0.84%
1999	235	+0.34%
2007	301	+3.14%
2012	286	−1.02%
2017	268	−1.29%
2023	254	−0.89%
Source: INSEE

== See also ==
- Communes of the Eure-et-Loir department
