= Communes of the Eure-et-Loir department =

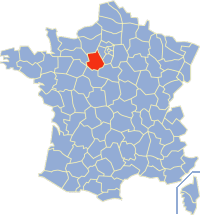

The following is a list of the 363 communes of the Eure-et-Loir department of France.

The communes cooperate in the following intercommunalities (as of 2025):

- Communauté d'agglomération Chartres Métropole
- Communauté d'agglomération du Pays de Dreux (partly)
- Communauté de communes du Bonnevalais
- Communauté de communes Cœur de Beauce
- Communauté de communes Entre Beauce et Perche
- Communauté de communes des Forêts du Perche
- Communauté de communes du Grand Châteaudun
- Communauté de communes Interco Normandie Sud Eure (partly)
- Communauté de communes du Pays Houdanais (partly)
- Communauté de communes du Perche
- Communauté de communes des Portes Euréliennes d'Île-de-France
- Communauté de communes Terres de Perche

INSEE	Postal	Commune
28001	28410	Abondant
28003	28500	Allainville
28004	28150	Allonnes
28005	28800	Alluyes
28006	28300	Amilly
28007	28260	Anet
28236	28400	Arcisses
28008	28170	Ardelles
28009	28700	Ardelu
28010	28480	Argenvilliers
28013	28700	Aunay-sous-Auneau
28014	28500	Aunay-sous-Crécy
28015	28700	Auneau-Bleury-Saint-Symphorien
28016	28330	Les Autels-Villevillon
28018	28330	Authon-du-Perche
28019	28140	Baigneaux
28023	28320	Bailleau-Armenonville
28021	28120	Bailleau-le-Pin
28022	28300	Bailleau-l'Évêque
28024	28630	Barjouville
28026	28310	Baudreville
28027	28330	La Bazoche-Gouet
28028	28140	Bazoches-en-Dunois
28029	28140	Bazoches-les-Hautes
28030	28270	Beauche
28031	28480	Beaumont-les-Autels
28032	28150	Beauvilliers
28033	28240	Belhomert-Guéhouville
28035	28630	Berchères-les-Pierres
28034	28300	Berchères-Saint-Germain
28036	28260	Berchères-sur-Vesgre
28037	28270	Bérou-la-Mulotière
28038	28330	Béthonvilliers
28039	28700	Béville-le-Comte
28040	28190	Billancelles
28041	28120	Blandainville
28045	28500	Boissy-en-Drouais
28046	28340	Boissy-lès-Perche
28047	28150	Boisville-la-Saint-Père
28049	28150	Boncé
28050	28260	Boncourt
28051	28800	Bonneval
28052	28130	Bouglainval
28053	28170	Le Boullay-les-Deux-Églises
28054	28210	Le Boullay-Mivoye
28055	28210	Le Boullay-Thierry
28048	28360	La Bourdinière-Saint-Loup
28056	28410	Boutigny-Prouais
28057	28800	Bouville
28058	28210	Bréchamps
28059	28270	Brezolles
28060	28300	Briconville
28061	28160	Brou
28062	28410	Broué
28064	28410	Bû
28065	28800	Bullainville
28067	28120	Cernay
28068	28300	Challet
28070	28300	Champhol
28071	28240	Champrond-en-Gâtine
28072	28400	Champrond-en-Perchet
28073	28700	Champseru
28074	28700	La Chapelle-d'Aunainville
28075	28200	La Chapelle-du-Noyer
28076	28500	La Chapelle-Forainvilliers
28077	28340	La Chapelle-Fortin
28078	28330	Chapelle-Guillaume
28079	28290	Chapelle-Royale
28080	28330	Charbonnières
28081	28120	Charonville
28082	28500	Charpont
28084	28130	Chartainvilliers
28085	28000	Chartres
28086	28480	Chassant
28087	28270	Châtaincourt
28088	28200	Châteaudun
28089	28170	Châteauneuf-en-Thymerais
28090	28270	Les Châtelets
28091	28120	Les Châtelliers-Notre-Dame
28092	28700	Châtenay
28094	28210	Chaudon
28095	28120	Chauffours
28096	28260	La Chaussée-d'Ivry
28098	28500	Cherisy
28099	28190	Chuisnes
28100	28300	Cintray
28102	28300	Clévilliers
28103	28220	Cloyes-les-Trois-Rivières
28104	28300	Coltainville
28105	28480	Combres
28012	28290	Commune nouvelle d'Arrou
28106	28200	Conie-Molitard
28107	28630	Corancez
28108	28140	Cormainville
28109	28240	Les Corvées-les-Yys
28110	28630	Le Coudray
28111	28330	Coudray-au-Perche
28113	28210	Coulombs
28114	28140	Courbehaye
28116	28190	Courville-sur-Eure
28117	28500	Crécy-Couvé
28118	28210	Croisilles
28119	28480	La Croix-du-Perche
28120	28270	Crucey-Villages
28121	28140	Dambron
28122	28360	Dammarie
28123	28160	Dampierre-sous-Brou
28124	28350	Dampierre-sur-Avre
28126	28800	Dancy
28127	28160	Dangeau
28128	28190	Dangers
28129	28700	Denonville
28130	28250	Digny
28132	28200	Donnemain-Saint-Mamès
28134	28100	Dreux
28135	28230	Droue-sur-Drouette
28136	28500	Écluzelles
28137	28320	Écrosnes
28406	28150	Éole-en-Beauce
28139	28120	Épeautrolles
28140	28230	Épernon
28141	28120	Ermenonville-la-Grande
28142	28120	Ermenonville-la-Petite
28143	28270	Escorpain
28144	28330	Les Étilleux
28146	28210	Faverolles
28147	28170	Favières
28148	28190	Le Favril
28149	28340	La Ferté-Vidame
28151	28270	Fessanvilliers-Mattanvilliers
28153	28800	Flacey
28154	28190	Fontaine-la-Guyon
28155	28170	Fontaine-les-Ribouts
28156	28240	Fontaine-Simon
28157	28140	Fontenay-sur-Conie
28158	28630	Fontenay-sur-Eure
28159	28250	La Framboisière
28160	28700	Francourville
28161	28160	Frazé
28162	28360	Fresnay-le-Comte
28163	28300	Fresnay-le-Gilmert
28164	28310	Fresnay-l'Évêque
28166	28240	Friaize
28167	28190	Fruncé
28168	28320	Gallardon
28169	28700	Garancières-en-Beauce
28170	28500	Garancières-en-Drouais
28171	28500	Garnay
28172	28320	Gas
28173	28300	Gasville-Oisème
28175	28400	La Gaudaine
28176	28800	Le Gault-Saint-Denis
28177	28630	Gellainville
28178	28500	Germainville
28180	28260	Gilles
28182	28160	Gohory
28183	28310	Gommerville
28184	28310	Gouillons
28185	28410	Goussainville
28187	28260	Guainville
28188	28700	Le Gué-de-Longroi
28189	28310	Guilleville
28190	28140	Guillonville
28191	28130	Hanches
28192	28480	Happonvilliers
28193	28410	Havelu
28194	28700	Houville-la-Branche
28195	28130	Houx
28196	28120	Illiers-Combray
28197	28310	Intréville
28198	28200	Jallans
28199	28310	Janville-en-Beauce
28200	28250	Jaudrais
28201	28300	Jouy
28202	28340	Lamblore
28203	28190	Landelles
28206	28270	Laons
28207	28700	Léthuin
28208	28700	Levainville
28209	28300	Lèves
28210	28310	Levesville-la-Chenard
28211	28200	Logron
28212	28140	Loigny-la-Bataille

INSEE	Postal	Commune
28213	28210	Lormaye
28214	28240	La Loupe
28215	28150	Louville-la-Chenard
28216	28500	Louvilliers-en-Drouais
28217	28250	Louvilliers-lès-Perche
28218	28110	Lucé
28219	28480	Luigny
28220	28600	Luisant
28221	28140	Lumeau
28222	28360	Luplanté
28223	28500	Luray
28225	28120	Magny
28226	28170	Maillebois
28227	28130	Maintenon
28229	28300	Mainvilliers
28230	28700	Maisons
28231	28270	La Mancelière
28232	28240	Manou
28233	28200	Marboué
28234	28120	Marchéville
28235	28410	Marchezais
28237	28400	Marolles-les-Buis
28239	28500	Marville-Moutiers-Brûlé
28240	28240	Meaucé
28242	28120	Méréglise
28243	28310	Mérouville
28245	28120	Meslay-le-Grenet
28246	28360	Meslay-le-Vidame
28247	28260	Le Mesnil-Simon
28248	28250	Le Mesnil-Thomas
28249	28130	Mévoisins
28251	28500	Mézières-en-Drouais
28252	28480	Miermaigne
28253	28630	Mignières
28254	28190	Mittainvilliers-Vérigny
28255	28700	Moinville-la-Jeulin
28256	28200	Moléans
28257	28700	Mondonville-Saint-Jean
28259	28800	Montboissier
28260	28800	Montharville
28261	28120	Montigny-le-Chartif
28263	28270	Montigny-sur-Avre
28264	28240	Montireau
28265	28240	Montlandon
28267	28500	Montreuil
28268	28700	Morainville
28269	28630	Morancez
28270	28800	Moriers
28271	28340	Morvilliers
28272	28160	Mottereau
28273	28160	Moulhard
28274	28150	Moutiers
28275	28210	Néron
28319	28310	Neuville Saint Denis
28277	28800	Neuvy-en-Dunois
28278	28630	Nogent-le-Phaye
28279	28210	Nogent-le-Roi
28280	28400	Nogent-le-Rotrou
28281	28120	Nogent-sur-Eure
28282	28120	Nonvilliers-Grandhoux
28283	28140	Nottonville
28284	28310	Oinville-Saint-Liphard
28285	28700	Oinville-sous-Auneau
28286	28120	Ollé
28287	28140	Orgères-en-Beauce
28289	28210	Ormoy
28290	28190	Orrouer
28291	28150	Ouarville
28292	28500	Ouerre
28293	28260	Oulins
28294	28700	Oysonville
28296	28140	Péronville
28298	28130	Pierres
28299	28210	Les Pinthières
28300	28310	Poinville
28301	28300	Poisvilliers
28302	28190	Pontgouin
28303	28140	Poupry
28304	28150	Prasville
28305	28800	Pré-Saint-Évroult
28306	28800	Pré-Saint-Martin
28308	28270	Prudemanche
28309	28360	Prunay-le-Gillon
28310	28250	La Puisaye
28312	28170	Puiseux
28313	28150	Réclainville
28314	28340	Les Ressuintes
28315	28270	Revercourt
28316	28340	Rohaire
28317	28700	Roinville
28321	28260	Rouvres
28322	28270	Rueil-la-Gadelière
28323	28170	Saint-Ange-et-Torçay
28324	28190	Saint-Arnoult-des-Bois
28325	28300	Saint-Aubin-des-Bois
28326	28120	Saint-Avit-les-Guespières
28327	28330	Saint-Bomer
28329	28200	Saint-Christophe
28333	28240	Saint-Denis-des-Puits
28334	28200	Saint-Denis-Lanneray
28332	28500	Sainte-Gemme-Moronval
28335	28240	Saint-Éliph
28336	28120	Saint-Éman
28337	28190	Saint-Georges-sur-Eure
28339	28190	Saint-Germain-le-Gaillard
28331	28480	Saintigny
28341	28170	Saint-Jean-de-Rebervilliers
28342	28400	Saint-Jean-Pierre-Fixte
28343	28210	Saint-Laurent-la-Gâtine
28344	28700	Saint-Léger-des-Aubées
28346	28270	Saint-Lubin-de-Cravant
28347	28410	Saint-Lubin-de-la-Haye
28348	28350	Saint-Lubin-des-Joncherets
28349	28210	Saint-Lucien
28350	28190	Saint-Luperce
28351	28170	Saint-Maixme-Hauterive
28352	28130	Saint-Martin-de-Nigelles
28354	28240	Saint-Maurice-Saint-Germain
28353	28800	Saint-Maur-sur-le-Loir
28355	28260	Saint-Ouen-Marchefroy
28357	28130	Saint-Piat
28358	28300	Saint-Prest
28359	28380	Saint-Rémy-sur-Avre
28360	28170	Saint-Sauveur-Marville
28362	28240	Saint-Victor-de-Buthon
28363	28700	Sainville
28364	28800	Sancheville
28365	28120	Sandarville
28366	28700	Santeuil
28367	28310	Santilly
28368	28250	La Saucelle
28369	28500	Saulnières
28370	28800	Saumeray
28371	28260	Saussay
28372	28210	Senantes
28373	28250	Senonches
28374	28170	Serazereux
28375	28410	Serville
28377	28260	Sorel-Moussel
28378	28400	Souancé-au-Perche
28379	28130	Soulaires
28380	28630	Sours
28382	28140	Terminiers
28383	28360	Theuville
28385	28240	Le Thieulin
28386	28170	Thimert-Gâtelles
28387	28480	Thiron-Gardais
28388	28630	Thivars
28389	28200	Thiville
28390	28140	Tillay-le-Péneux
28391	28310	Toury
28392	28310	Trancrainville
28393	28170	Tremblay-les-Villages
28394	28500	Tréon
28395	28400	Trizay-Coutretot-Saint-Serge
28396	28800	Trizay-lès-Bonneval
28397	28700	Umpeau
28398	28160	Unverre
28400	28140	Varize
28401	28240	Vaupillon
28403	28630	Ver-lès-Chartres
28404	28500	Vernouillet
28405	28500	Vert-en-Drouais
28407	28480	Vichères
28408	28700	Vierville
28409	28120	Vieuvicq
28422	28150	Les Villages Vovéens
28410	28200	Villampuy
28411	28150	Villars
28414	28190	Villebon
28330	28200	Villemaury
28415	28210	Villemeux-sur-Eure
28417	28130	Villiers-le-Morhier
28418	28800	Villiers-Saint-Orien
28419	28360	Vitray-en-Beauce
28421	28700	Voise
28423	28130	Yermenonville
28424	28160	Yèvres
28425	28320	Ymeray
28426	28150	Ymonville
