= Prasville =

- Commune
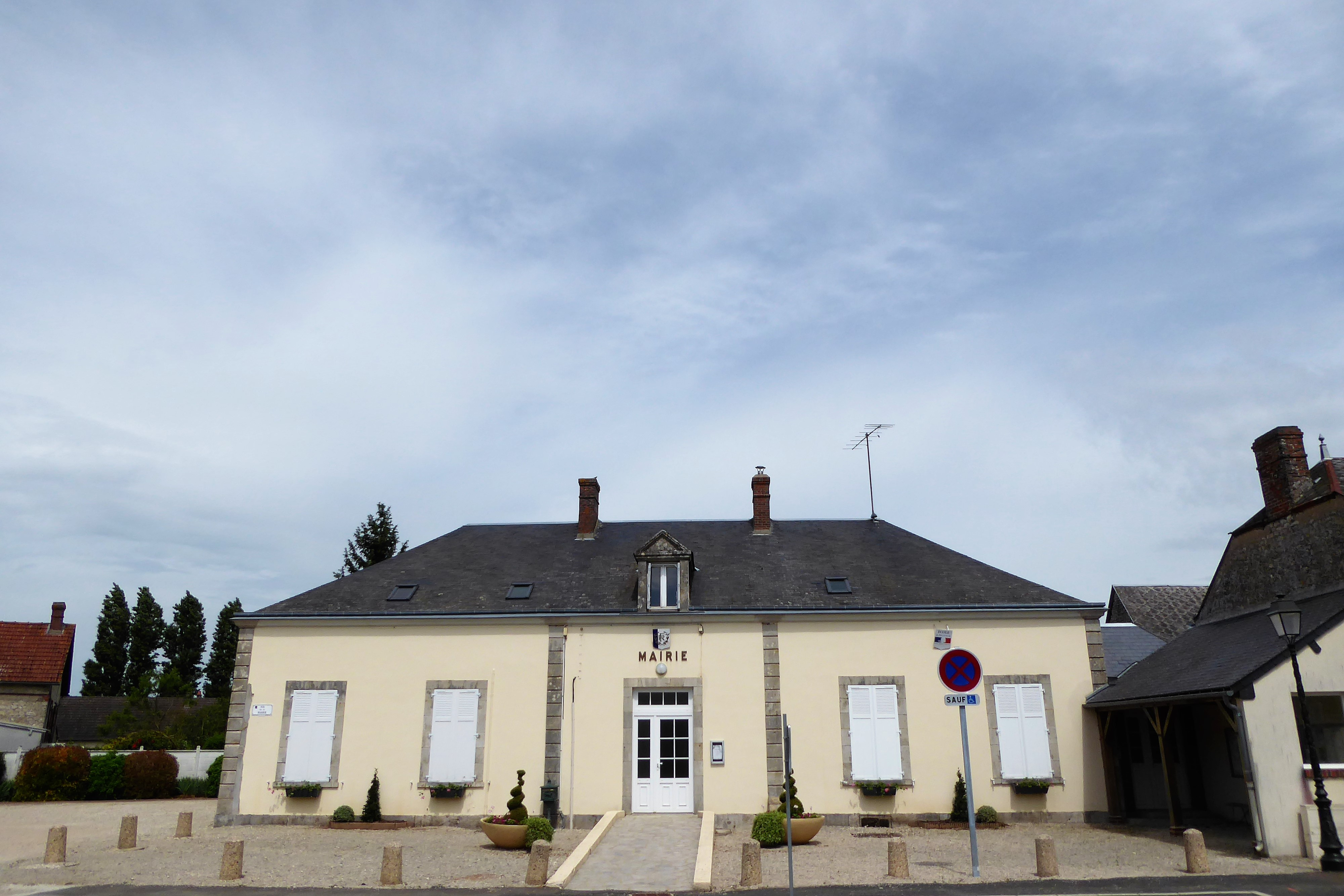
- The town hall in Prasville

- Coat of arms
- Location of Prasville
- Location within France Location within Centre-Val de Loire
- Coordinates: 48°16′36″N 1°42′42″E
- Country: France
- Region: Centre-Val de Loire
- Department: Eure-et-Loir
- Arrondissement: Chartres
- Canton: Les Villages Vovéens

Government
  - Mayor (2022–2026): Isabelle Montguillon
- Area^{1}: 16.26 km^{2} (6.28 sq mi)
- Elevation: 148 m (486 ft)
- Highest elevation: 148 m (486 ft)
- Lowest elevation: 123 m (404 ft)
- Population (2023): 451
  - Density: 27.7/km^{2} (71.8/sq mi)
- Time zone: UTC+01:00 (CET)
  - Summer (DST): UTC+02:00 (CEST)
- INSEE/Postal code: 28304 /28150
- ^{1} French Land Register data, which excludes lakes, ponds, glaciers > 1 km^{2} (0.386 sq mi or 247 acres) and river estuaries.

Prasville is a commune in the Eure-et-Loir department in northern France.

== Population ==
Historical population
| Year | Pop. | ±% p.a. |
|---|---|---|
| 1968 | 326 | — |
| 1975 | 283 | −2.00% |
| 1982 | 261 | −1.15% |
| 1990 | 257 | −0.19% |
| 1999 | 294 | +1.51% |
| 2007 | 329 | +1.42% |
| 2012 | 451 | +6.51% |
| 2017 | 431 | −0.90% |
| 2023 | 451 | +0.76% |
Source: INSEE

== See also ==
- Communes of the Eure-et-Loir department
