= Beauvilliers, Eure-et-Loir =

Beauvilliers
- Commune
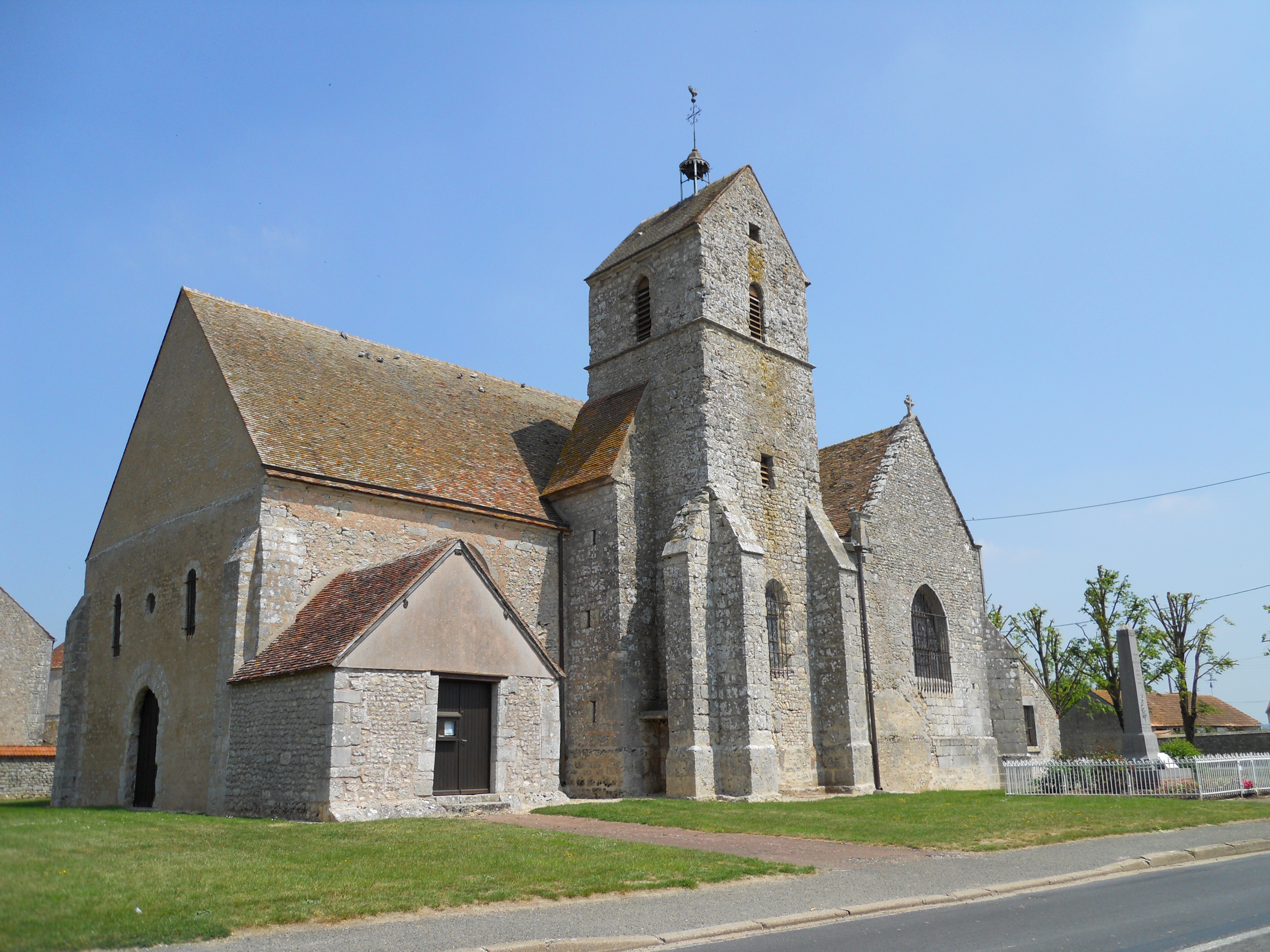
- The church in Beauvilliers

- Coat of arms
- Location of Beauvilliers
- Location within France Location within Centre-Val de Loire
- Coordinates: 48°17′53″N 1°39′19″E
- Country: France
- Region: Centre-Val de Loire
- Department: Eure-et-Loir
- Arrondissement: Chartres
- Canton: Les Villages Vovéens

Government
  - Mayor (2020–2026): Jean-Claude Bayarri
- Area^{1}: 23.05 km^{2} (8.90 sq mi)
- Elevation: 146 m (479 ft)
- Highest elevation: 151 m (495 ft)
- Lowest elevation: 136 m (446 ft)
- Population (2023): 340
  - Density: 15/km^{2} (38/sq mi)
- Time zone: UTC+01:00 (CET)
  - Summer (DST): UTC+02:00 (CEST)
- INSEE/Postal code: 28032 /28150
- ^{1} French Land Register data, which excludes lakes, ponds, glaciers > 1 km^{2} (0.386 sq mi or 247 acres) and river estuaries.

Beauvilliers (French pronunciation: [bovilje]) is a commune in the Eure-et-Loir department in northern France.

== Population ==
Historical population
Year	Pop.	±% p.a.
1968	343	—
1975	271	−3.31%
1982	202	−4.11%
1990	210	+0.49%
1999	256	+2.23%
2007	300	+2.00%
2012	324	+1.55%
2017	335	+0.67%
2023	340	+0.25%
Source: INSEE

== See also ==
- Communes of the Eure-et-Loir department
