= Guilleville =

- Commune
- Coat of arms
- Location of Guilleville
- Location within France Location within Centre-Val de Loire
- Coordinates: 48°13′31″N 1°48′52″E
- Country: France
- Region: Centre-Val de Loire
- Department: Eure-et-Loir
- Arrondissement: Chartres
- Canton: Les Villages Vovéens

Government
  - Mayor (2020–2026): Benoît Mesland
- Area^{1}: 13.41 km^{2} (5.18 sq mi)
- Elevation: 137 m (449 ft)
- Highest elevation: 142 m (466 ft)
- Lowest elevation: 122 m (400 ft)
- Population (2023): 156
  - Density: 11.6/km^{2} (30.1/sq mi)
- Time zone: UTC+01:00 (CET)
  - Summer (DST): UTC+02:00 (CEST)
- INSEE/Postal code: 28189 /28310
- ^{1} French Land Register data, which excludes lakes, ponds, glaciers > 1 km^{2} (0.386 sq mi or 247 acres) and river estuaries.

Guilleville is a commune in the Eure-et-Loir department in northern France.

== Population ==
Historical population
Year	Pop.	±% p.a.
1968	172	—
1975	168	−0.34%
1982	155	−1.14%
1990	143	−1.00%
1999	173	+2.14%
2007	177	+0.29%
2012	187	+1.11%
2017	178	−0.98%
2023	156	−2.17%
Source: INSEE

== See also ==
- Communes of the Eure-et-Loir department
