= Fresnay-l'Évêque =

- Commune
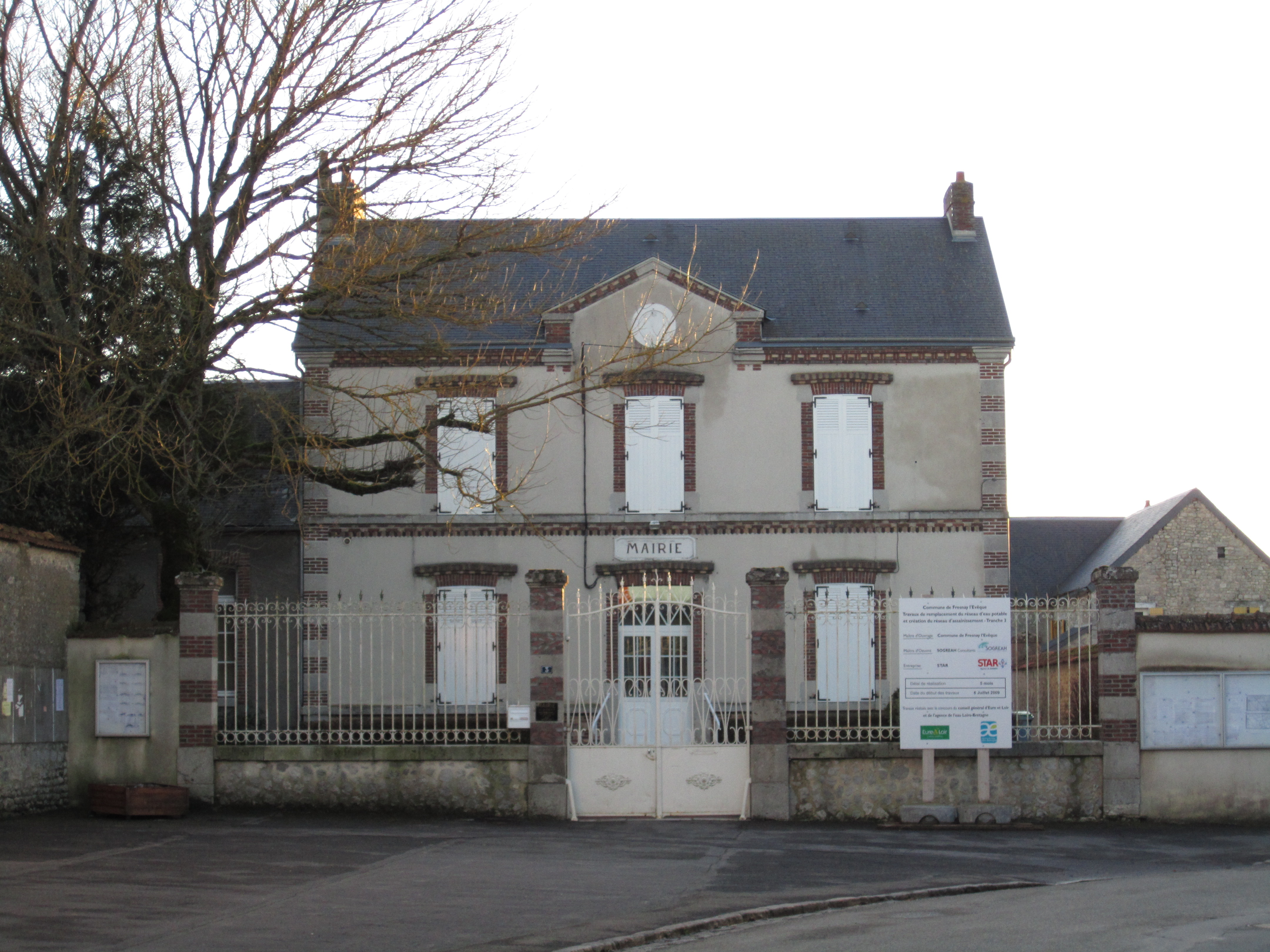
- The town hall in Fresnay-l'Évêque
- Location of Fresnay-l'Évêque
- Location within France Location within Centre-Val de Loire
- Coordinates: 48°15′58″N 1°49′23″E
- Country: France
- Region: Centre-Val de Loire
- Department: Eure-et-Loir
- Arrondissement: Chartres
- Canton: Les Villages Vovéens

Government
  - Mayor (2020–2026): Francis Besnard
- Area^{1}: 29.04 km^{2} (11.21 sq mi)
- Elevation: 143 m (469 ft)
- Highest elevation: 146 m (479 ft)
- Lowest elevation: 121 m (397 ft)
- Population (2023): 739
  - Density: 25.4/km^{2} (65.9/sq mi)
- Time zone: UTC+01:00 (CET)
  - Summer (DST): UTC+02:00 (CEST)
- INSEE/Postal code: 28164 /28310
- ^{1} French Land Register data, which excludes lakes, ponds, glaciers > 1 km^{2} (0.386 sq mi or 247 acres) and river estuaries.

Fresnay-l'Évêque (French pronunciation: [fʁɛnɛ levɛk]) is a commune in the Eure-et-Loir department in northern France.

== Population ==
Historical population
Year	Pop.	±% p.a.
1968	624	—
1975	516	−2.68%
1982	510	−0.17%
1990	555	+1.06%
1999	560	+0.10%
2007	646	+1.80%
2012	728	+2.42%
2017	741	+0.35%
2023	739	−0.05%
Source: INSEE

== See also ==
- Communes of the Eure-et-Loir department
