= Pré-Saint-Évroult =

- Commune
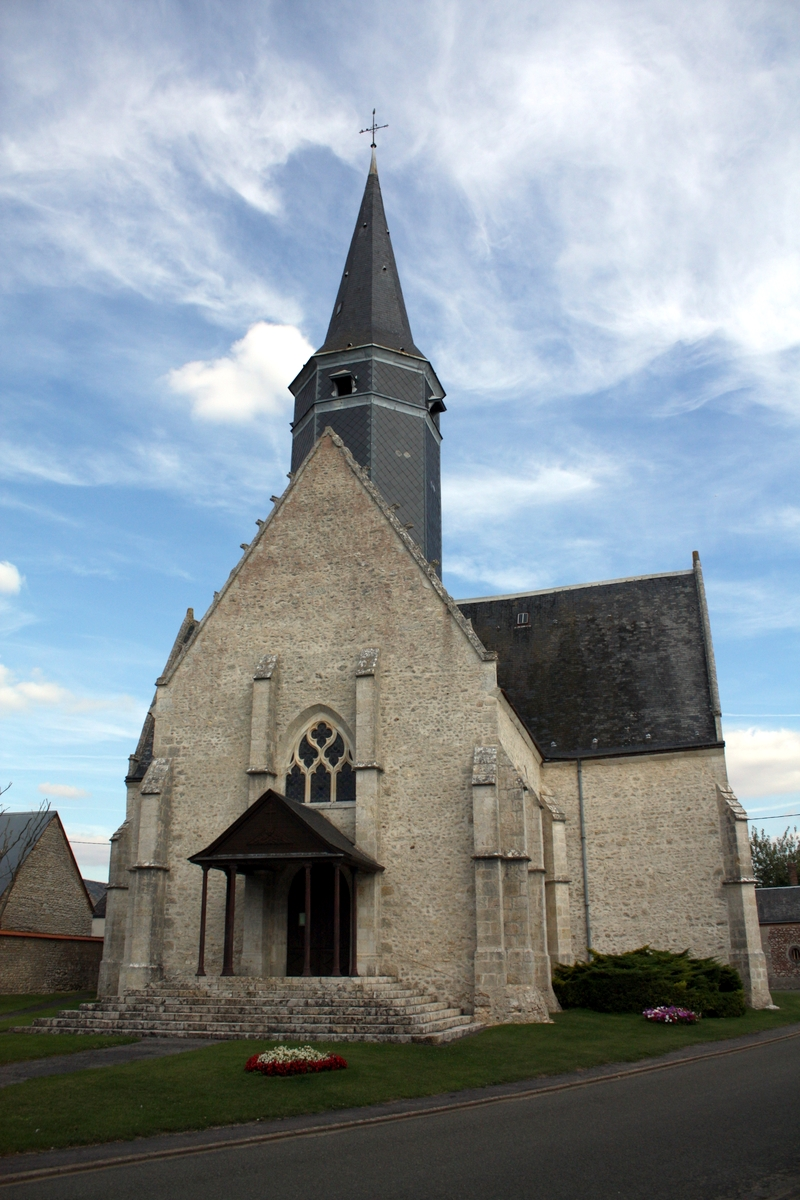
- The church in Pré-Saint-Évroult
- Location of Pré-Saint-Évroult
- Location within France Location within Centre-Val de Loire
- Coordinates: 48°11′07″N 1°28′07″E
- Country: France
- Region: Centre-Val de Loire
- Department: Eure-et-Loir
- Arrondissement: Châteaudun
- Canton: Les Villages Vovéens
- Intercommunality: Bonnevalais

Government
  - Mayor (2020–2026): Joël Lamy
- Area^{1}: 21.51 km^{2} (8.31 sq mi)
- Elevation: 134 m (440 ft)
- Highest elevation: 141 m (463 ft)
- Lowest elevation: 127 m (417 ft)
- Population (2023): 283
  - Density: 13.2/km^{2} (34.1/sq mi)
- Time zone: UTC+01:00 (CET)
  - Summer (DST): UTC+02:00 (CEST)
- INSEE/Postal code: 28305 /28800
- ^{1} French Land Register data, which excludes lakes, ponds, glaciers > 1 km^{2} (0.386 sq mi or 247 acres) and river estuaries.

Pré-Saint-Évroult (French pronunciation: [pʁe sɛ̃.t‿evʁu]) is a commune in the Eure-et-Loir department in northern France.

== Population ==
Historical population
Year	Pop.	±% p.a.
1968	302	—
1975	294	−0.38%
1982	252	−2.18%
1990	291	+1.81%
1999	277	−0.55%
2007	311	+1.46%
2012	287	−1.59%
2017	298	+0.76%
2023	283	−0.86%
Source: INSEE

== See also ==
- Communes of the Eure-et-Loir department
