= Baudreville, Eure-et-Loir =

Baudreville
- Commune
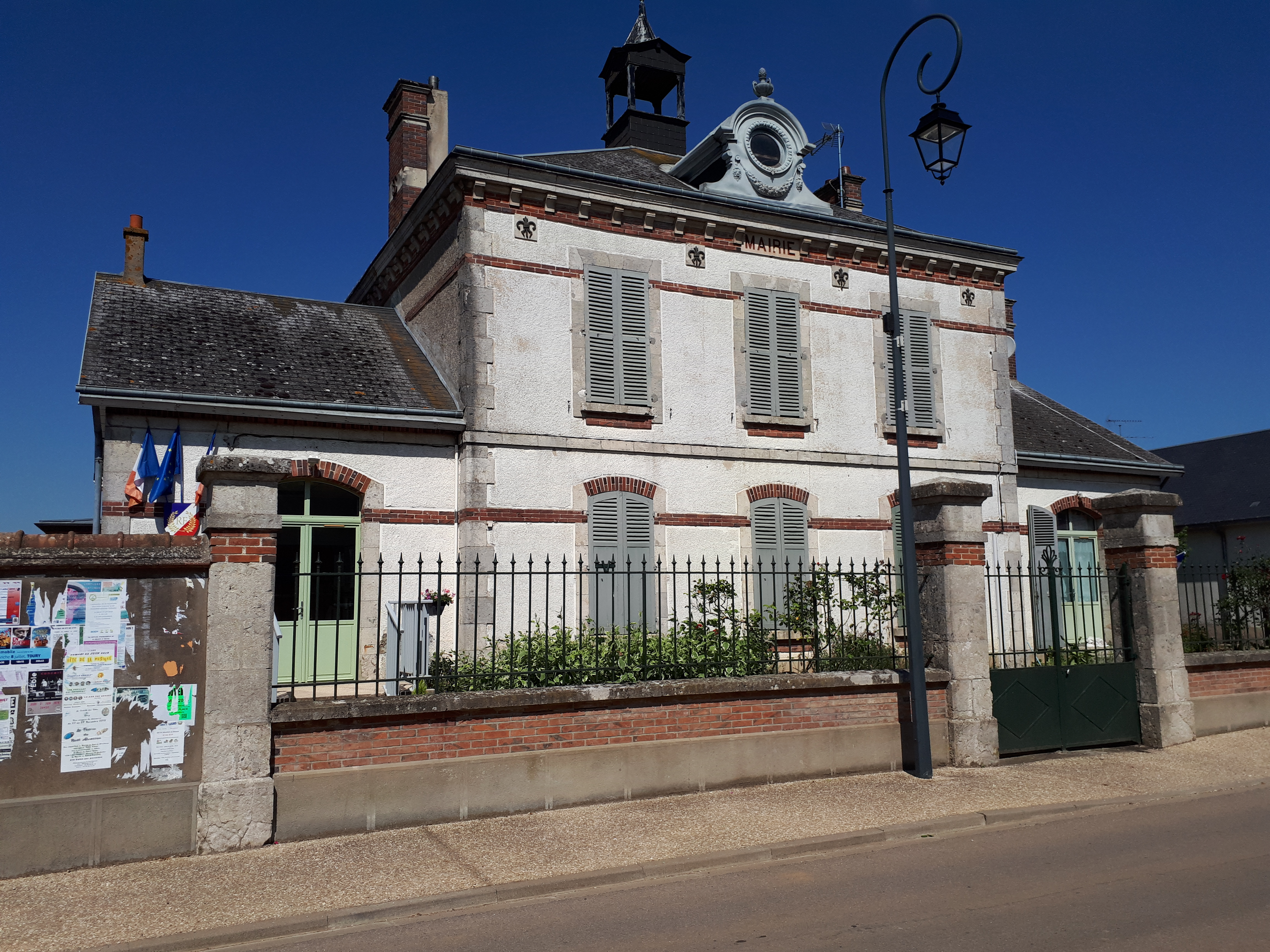
- The town hall in Baudreville
- Location of Baudreville
- Location within France Location within Centre-Val de Loire
- Coordinates: 48°19′57″N 1°54′23″E
- Country: France
- Region: Centre-Val de Loire
- Department: Eure-et-Loir
- Arrondissement: Chartres
- Canton: Les Villages Vovéens
- Intercommunality: Cœur de Beauce

Government
  - Mayor (2020–2026): Brigitte Chauvel
- Area^{1}: 13.03 km^{2} (5.03 sq mi)
- Elevation: 147 m (482 ft)
- Highest elevation: 151 m (495 ft)
- Lowest elevation: 133 m (436 ft)
- Population (2023): 247
  - Density: 19.0/km^{2} (49.1/sq mi)
- Time zone: UTC+01:00 (CET)
  - Summer (DST): UTC+02:00 (CEST)
- INSEE/Postal code: 28026 /28310
- ^{1} French Land Register data, which excludes lakes, ponds, glaciers > 1 km^{2} (0.386 sq mi or 247 acres) and river estuaries.

Baudreville (French pronunciation: [bodʁəvil]) is a commune in the Eure-et-Loir department in northern France.

== Population ==
Historical population
Year	Pop.	±% p.a.
1968	225	—
1975	257	+1.92%
1982	261	+0.22%
1990	247	−0.69%
1999	249	+0.09%
2007	283	+1.61%
2012	278	−0.36%
2017	259	−1.41%
2023	247	−0.79%
Source: INSEE

== See also ==
- Communes of the Eure-et-Loir department
