= Mérouville =

- Commune
- Location of Mérouville
- Location within France Location within Centre-Val de Loire
- Coordinates: 48°17′49″N 1°53′51″E
- Country: France
- Region: Centre-Val de Loire
- Department: Eure-et-Loir
- Arrondissement: Chartres
- Canton: Les Villages Vovéens
- Intercommunality: Cœur de Beauce

Government
  - Mayor (2023–2026): Yves Goron
- Area^{1}: 9.62 km^{2} (3.71 sq mi)
- Elevation: 140 m (460 ft)
- Highest elevation: 149 m (489 ft)
- Lowest elevation: 133 m (436 ft)
- Population (2023): 214
  - Density: 22.2/km^{2} (57.6/sq mi)
- Time zone: UTC+01:00 (CET)
  - Summer (DST): UTC+02:00 (CEST)
- INSEE/Postal code: 28243 /28310
- ^{1} French Land Register data, which excludes lakes, ponds, glaciers > 1 km^{2} (0.386 sq mi or 247 acres) and river estuaries.

Mérouville (French pronunciation: [meʁuvil]) is a commune in the Eure-et-Loir department in northern France.

== Population ==
Historical population
| Year | Pop. | ±% p.a. |
|---|---|---|
| 1968 | 228 | — |
| 1975 | 215 | −0.84% |
| 1982 | 206 | −0.61% |
| 1990 | 201 | −0.31% |
| 1999 | 181 | −1.16% |
| 2007 | 234 | +3.26% |
| 2012 | 217 | −1.50% |
| 2017 | 218 | +0.09% |
| 2023 | 214 | −0.31% |
Source: INSEE

== See also ==
- Communes of the Eure-et-Loir department
