= Bullainville =

- Commune
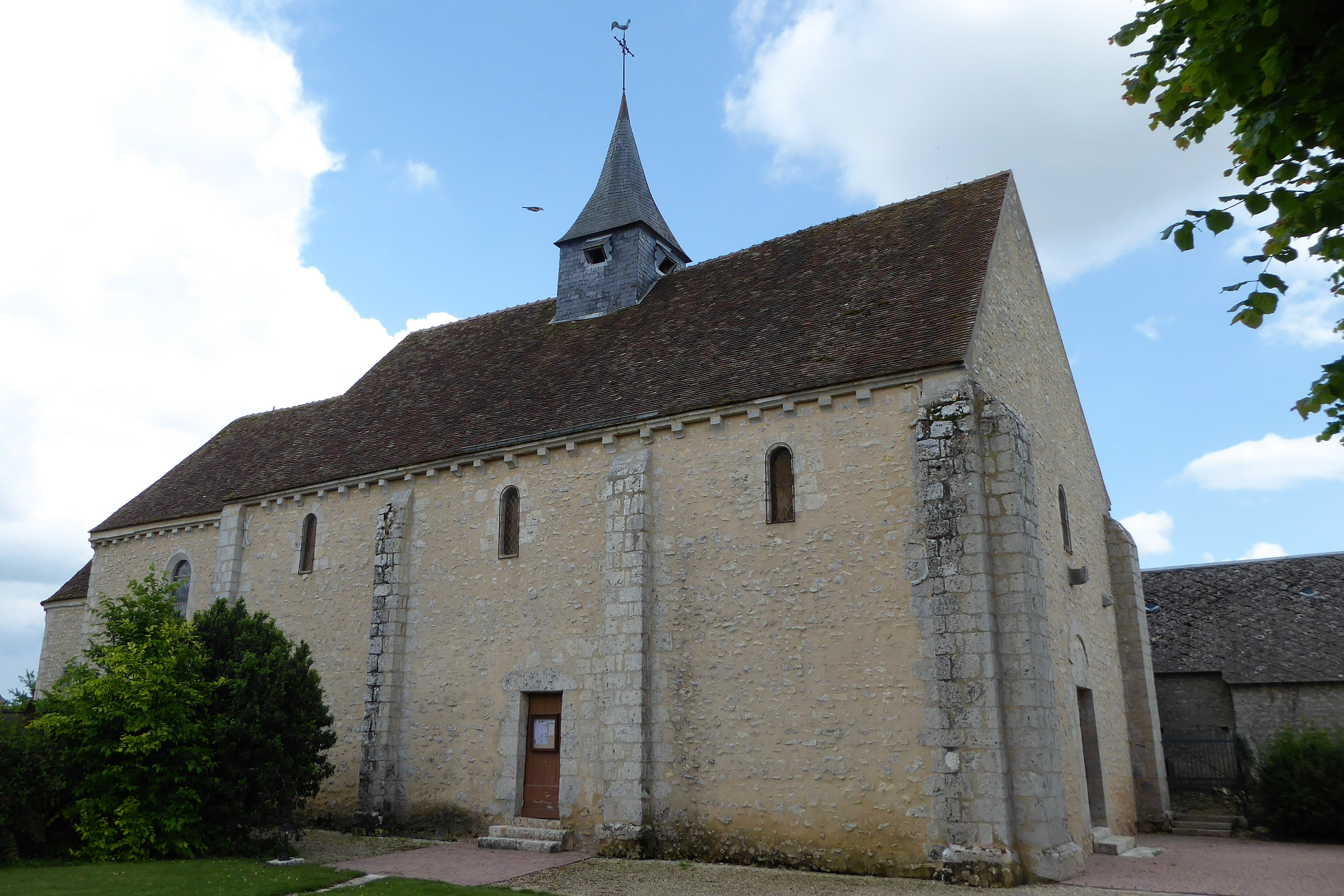
- The church in Bullainville
- Location of Bullainville
- Location within France Location within Centre-Val de Loire
- Coordinates: 48°10′18″N 1°30′33″E
- Country: France
- Region: Centre-Val de Loire
- Department: Eure-et-Loir
- Arrondissement: Châteaudun
- Canton: Les Villages Vovéens
- Intercommunality: CC Bonnevalais

Government
  - Mayor (2020–2026): Jack Dazard
- Area^{1}: 6.66 km^{2} (2.57 sq mi)
- Elevation: 140 m (460 ft)
- Highest elevation: 141 m (463 ft)
- Lowest elevation: 131 m (430 ft)
- Population (2023): 115
  - Density: 17.3/km^{2} (44.7/sq mi)
- Time zone: UTC+01:00 (CET)
  - Summer (DST): UTC+02:00 (CEST)
- INSEE/Postal code: 28065 /28800
- ^{1} French Land Register data, which excludes lakes, ponds, glaciers > 1 km^{2} (0.386 sq mi or 247 acres) and river estuaries.

Bullainville (French pronunciation: [bylɛ̃vil]) is a commune in the Eure-et-Loir department and Centre-Val de Loire region of north-central France. It lies 30 km south of Chartres and some 100 km south-west of Paris.

== Population ==
Historical population
Year	Pop.	±% p.a.
1968	133	—
1975	115	−2.06%
1982	101	−1.84%
1990	95	−0.76%
1999	83	−1.49%
2007	106	+3.10%
2012	112	+1.11%
2017	108	−0.72%
2023	115	+1.05%
Source: INSEE

== See also ==
- Communes of the Eure-et-Loir department
