= Le Gault-Saint-Denis =

- Commune
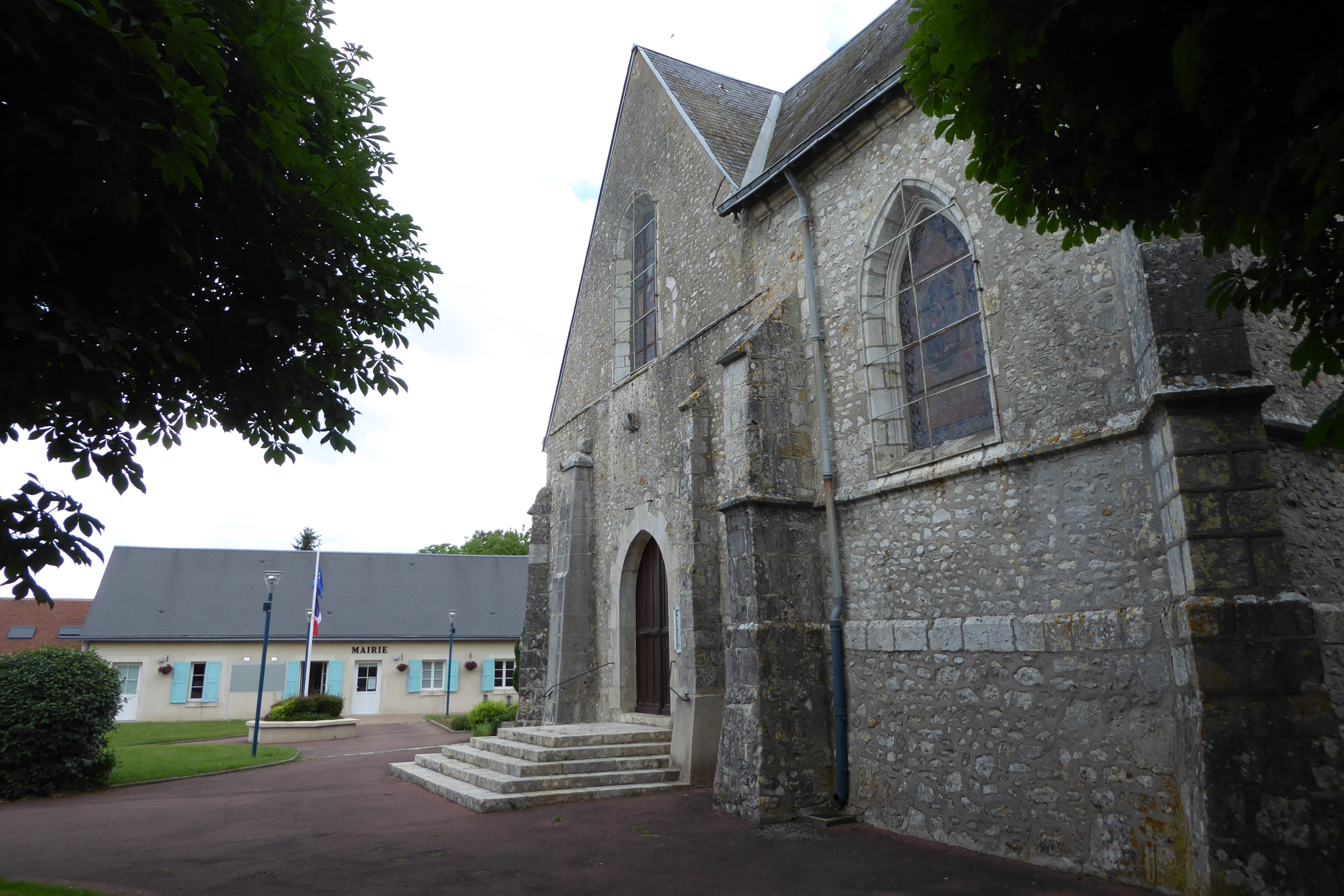
- The town hall and church in Le Gault-Saint-Denis
- Location of Le Gault-Saint-Denis
- Location within France Location within Centre-Val de Loire
- Coordinates: 48°14′39″N 1°29′10″E
- Country: France
- Region: Centre-Val de Loire
- Department: Eure-et-Loir
- Arrondissement: Châteaudun
- Canton: Les Villages Vovéens
- Intercommunality: Bonnevalais

Government
  - Mayor (2020–2026): David Legrand
- Area^{1}: 23.35 km^{2} (9.02 sq mi)
- Elevation: 139 m (456 ft)
- Highest elevation: 151 m (495 ft)
- Lowest elevation: 132 m (433 ft)
- Population (2023): 666
  - Density: 28.5/km^{2} (73.9/sq mi)
- Time zone: UTC+01:00 (CET)
  - Summer (DST): UTC+02:00 (CEST)
- INSEE/Postal code: 28176 /28800
- ^{1} French Land Register data, which excludes lakes, ponds, glaciers > 1 km^{2} (0.386 sq mi or 247 acres) and river estuaries.

Le Gault-Saint-Denis is a commune in the Eure-et-Loir department in northern France.

== Population ==
Historical population
Year	Pop.	±% p.a.
1968	614	—
1975	539	−1.84%
1982	507	−0.87%
1990	540	+0.79%
1999	538	−0.04%
2007	670	+2.78%
2012	684	+0.41%
2017	674	−0.29%
2023	666	−0.20%
Source: INSEE

== See also ==
- Communes of the Eure-et-Loir department
