= Dambron =

- Commune
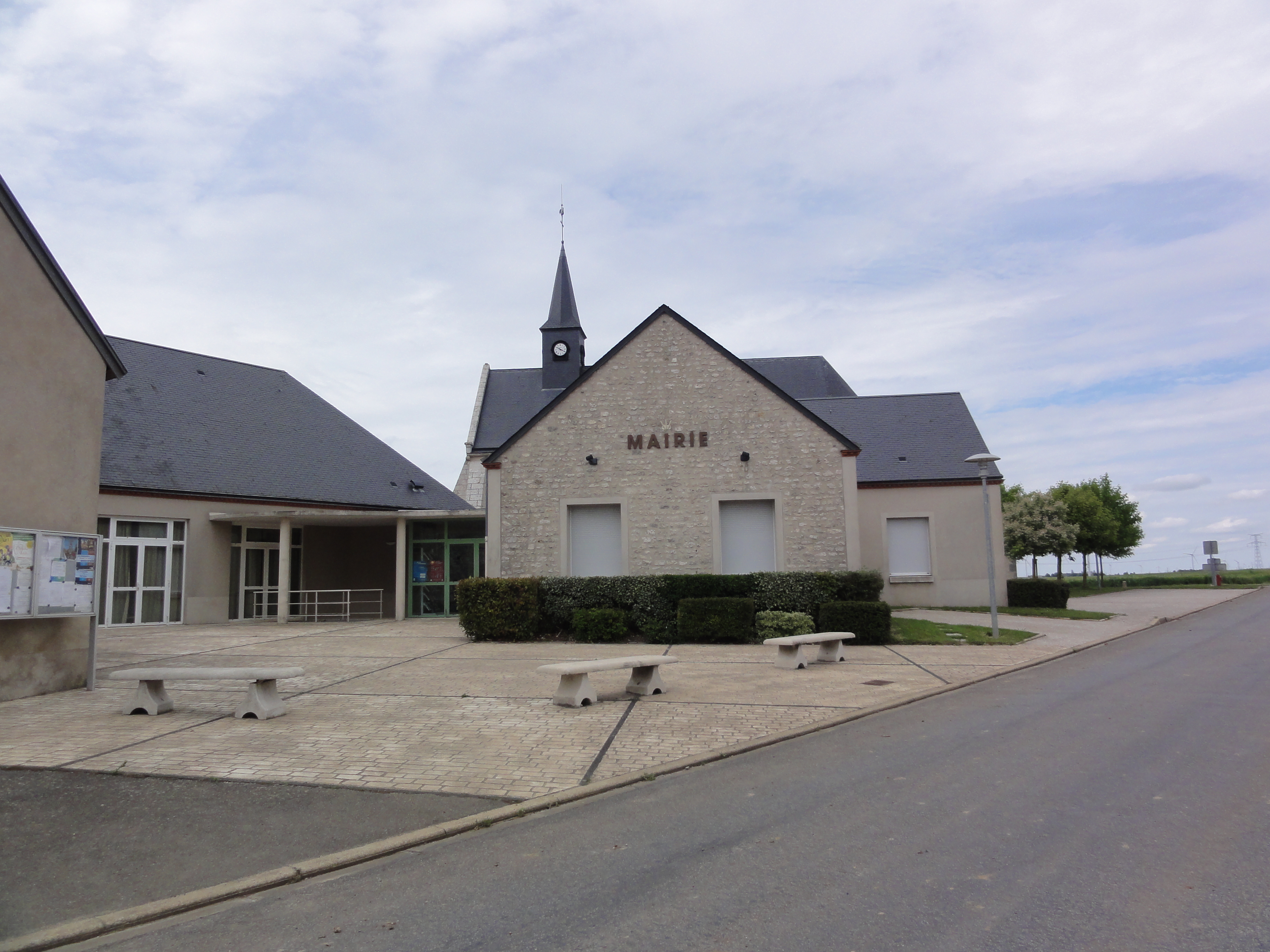
- The town hall in Dambron
- Location of Dambron
- Location within France Location within Centre-Val de Loire
- Coordinates: 48°06′51″N 1°52′19″E
- Country: France
- Region: Centre-Val de Loire
- Department: Eure-et-Loir
- Arrondissement: Châteaudun
- Canton: Les Villages Vovéens

Government
  - Mayor (2020–2026): Philippe Lesage
- Area^{1}: 11.99 km^{2} (4.63 sq mi)
- Elevation: 150 m (490 ft)
- Highest elevation: 130 m (430 ft)
- Lowest elevation: 119 m (390 ft)
- Population (2023): 93
  - Density: 7.8/km^{2} (20/sq mi)
- Time zone: UTC+01:00 (CET)
  - Summer (DST): UTC+02:00 (CEST)
- INSEE/Postal code: 28121 /28140
- ^{1} French Land Register data, which excludes lakes, ponds, glaciers > 1 km^{2} (0.386 sq mi or 247 acres) and river estuaries.

Dambron (French pronunciation: [dɑ̃bʁɔ̃]) is a commune in the Eure-et-Loir department in northern France.

== Population ==
Historical population
Year	Pop.	±% p.a.
1968	136	—
1975	104	−3.76%
1982	111	+0.93%
1990	104	−0.81%
1999	104	+0.00%
2007	93	−1.39%
2012	88	−1.10%
2017	102	+3.00%
2023	93	−1.53%
Source: INSEE

== See also ==
- Communes of the Eure-et-Loir department
