= Pré-Saint-Martin =

- Commune
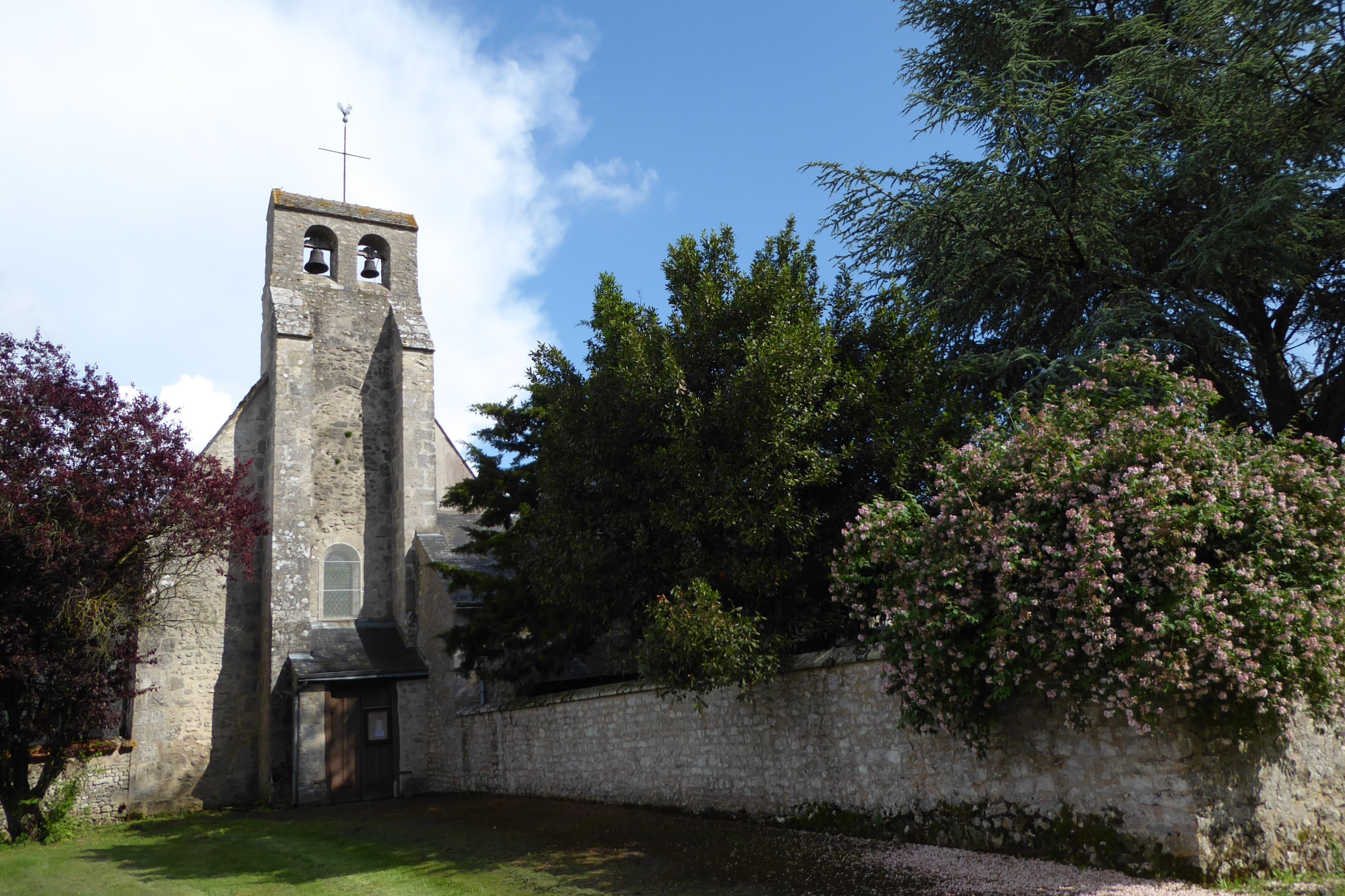
- The church in Pré-Saint-Martin
- Location of Pré-Saint-Martin
- Location within France Location within Centre-Val de Loire
- Coordinates: 48°12′47″N 1°28′01″E
- Country: France
- Region: Centre-Val de Loire
- Department: Eure-et-Loir
- Arrondissement: Châteaudun
- Canton: Les Villages Vovéens
- Intercommunality: Bonnevalais

Government
  - Mayor (2020–2026): Jean-Louis Hy
- Area^{1}: 7.25 km^{2} (2.80 sq mi)
- Elevation: 142 m (466 ft)
- Highest elevation: 143 m (469 ft)
- Lowest elevation: 133 m (436 ft)
- Population (2023): 174
  - Density: 24.0/km^{2} (62.2/sq mi)
- Time zone: UTC+01:00 (CET)
  - Summer (DST): UTC+02:00 (CEST)
- INSEE/Postal code: 28306 /28800
- ^{1} French Land Register data, which excludes lakes, ponds, glaciers > 1 km^{2} (0.386 sq mi or 247 acres) and river estuaries.

Pré-Saint-Martin (French pronunciation: [pʁe sɛ̃ maʁtɛ̃]) is a commune in the Eure-et-Loir department in northern France.

== Population ==
Historical population
Year	Pop.	±% p.a.
1968	210	—
1975	173	−2.73%
1982	141	−2.88%
1990	158	+1.43%
1999	139	−1.41%
2007	158	+1.61%
2012	166	+0.99%
2017	199	+3.69%
2023	174	−2.21%
Source: INSEE

== See also ==
- Communes of the Eure-et-Loir department
