= Villars, Eure-et-Loir =

Villars
- Commune
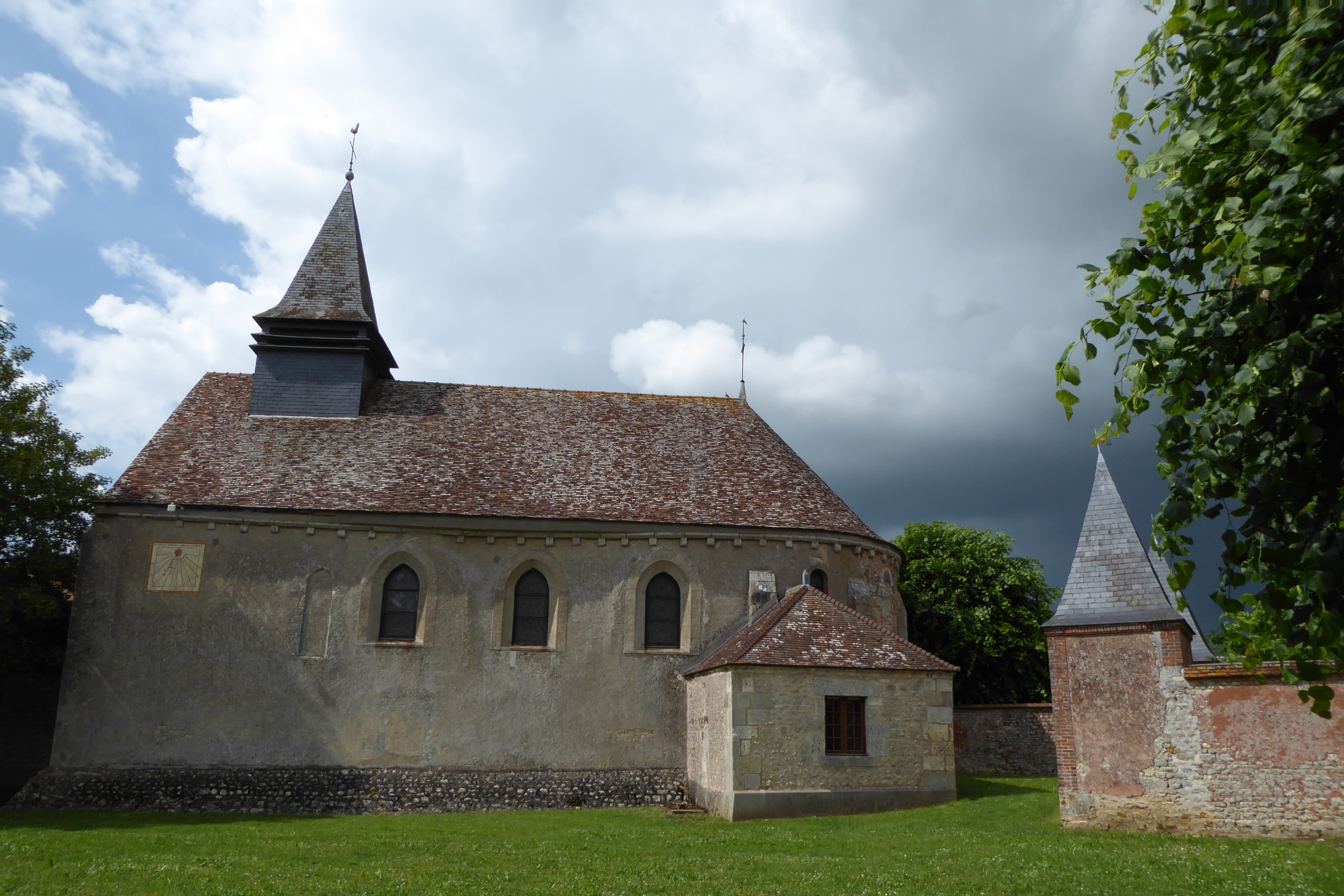
- The church in Villars
- Location of Villars
- Location within France Location within Centre-Val de Loire
- Coordinates: 48°13′55″N 1°33′08″E
- Country: France
- Region: Centre-Val de Loire
- Department: Eure-et-Loir
- Arrondissement: Chartres
- Canton: Les Villages Vovéens

Government
  - Mayor (2020–2026): Claude Billaud
- Area^{1}: 8.34 km^{2} (3.22 sq mi)
- Elevation: 144 m (472 ft)
- Highest elevation: 148 m (486 ft)
- Lowest elevation: 137 m (449 ft)
- Population (2023): 179
  - Density: 21.5/km^{2} (55.6/sq mi)
- Time zone: UTC+01:00 (CET)
  - Summer (DST): UTC+02:00 (CEST)
- INSEE/Postal code: 28411 /28150
- ^{1} French Land Register data, which excludes lakes, ponds, glaciers > 1 km^{2} (0.386 sq mi or 247 acres) and river estuaries.

Villars (French pronunciation: [vilaʁ]) is a commune in the Eure-et-Loir department in northern France.

== Population ==
Historical population
Year	Pop.	±% p.a.
1968	141	—
1975	122	−2.05%
1982	100	−2.80%
1990	114	+1.65%
1999	112	−0.20%
2007	131	+1.98%
2012	156	+3.55%
2017	175	+2.33%
2023	179	+0.38%
Source: INSEE

== See also ==
- Communes of the Eure-et-Loir department
