= Oinville-Saint-Liphard =

- Commune
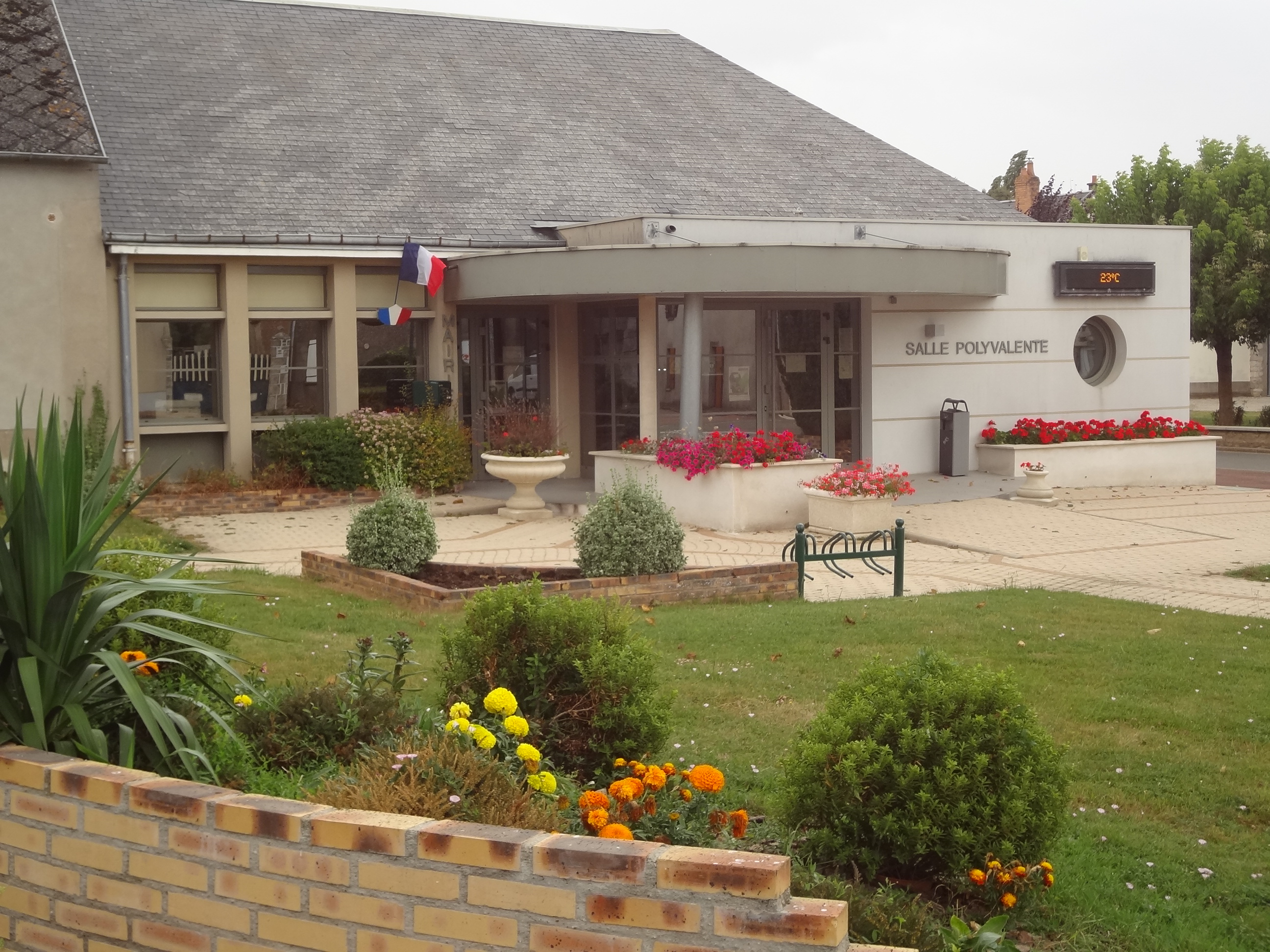
- The town hall in Oinville-Saint-Liphard

- Coat of arms
- Location of Oinville-Saint-Liphard
- Location within France Location within Centre-Val de Loire
- Coordinates: 48°14′05″N 1°55′05″E
- Country: France
- Region: Centre-Val de Loire
- Department: Eure-et-Loir
- Arrondissement: Chartres
- Canton: Les Villages Vovéens

Government
  - Mayor (2020–2026): Alain Dupuis
- Area^{1}: 21.77 km^{2} (8.41 sq mi)
- Elevation: 139 m (456 ft)
- Highest elevation: 142 m (466 ft)
- Lowest elevation: 132 m (433 ft)
- Population (2023): 279
  - Density: 12.8/km^{2} (33.2/sq mi)
- Time zone: UTC+01:00 (CET)
  - Summer (DST): UTC+02:00 (CEST)
- INSEE/Postal code: 28284 /28310
- ^{1} French Land Register data, which excludes lakes, ponds, glaciers > 1 km^{2} (0.386 sq mi or 247 acres) and river estuaries.

Oinville-Saint-Liphard (French pronunciation: [wɛ̃vil sɛ̃ lifaʁ]) is a commune in the Eure-et-Loir department in northern France.

== Population ==
Historical population
Year	Pop.	±% p.a.
1968	380	—
1975	324	−2.25%
1982	297	−1.24%
1990	272	−1.09%
1999	269	−0.12%
2007	267	−0.09%
2012	266	−0.08%
2017	276	+0.74%
2023	279	+0.18%
Source: INSEE

== See also ==
- Communes of the Eure-et-Loir department
