= Intréville =

- Commune
- Location of Intréville
- Location within France Location within Centre-Val de Loire
- Coordinates: 48°17′51″N 1°56′13″E
- Country: France
- Region: Centre-Val de Loire
- Department: Eure-et-Loir
- Arrondissement: Chartres
- Canton: Les Villages Vovéens
- Intercommunality: Cœur de Beauce

Government
  - Mayor (2024–2026): Jean-Pierre Bourret
- Area^{1}: 8.91 km^{2} (3.44 sq mi)
- Elevation: 146 m (479 ft)
- Highest elevation: 148 m (486 ft)
- Lowest elevation: 136 m (446 ft)
- Population (2023): 118
  - Density: 13.2/km^{2} (34.3/sq mi)
- Time zone: UTC+01:00 (CET)
  - Summer (DST): UTC+02:00 (CEST)
- INSEE/Postal code: 28197 /28310
- ^{1} French Land Register data, which excludes lakes, ponds, glaciers > 1 km^{2} (0.386 sq mi or 247 acres) and river estuaries.

Intréville (French pronunciation: [ɛ̃tʁevil]) is a commune in the Eure-et-Loir department in northern France.

== Population ==
Historical population
Year	Pop.	±% p.a.
1968	134	—
1975	124	−1.10%
1982	141	+1.85%
1990	144	+0.26%
1999	148	+0.30%
2007	130	−1.61%
2012	131	+0.15%
2017	145	+2.05%
2023	118	−3.38%
Source: INSEE

== See also ==
- Communes of the Eure-et-Loir department
