= Louville-la-Chenard =

- Commune
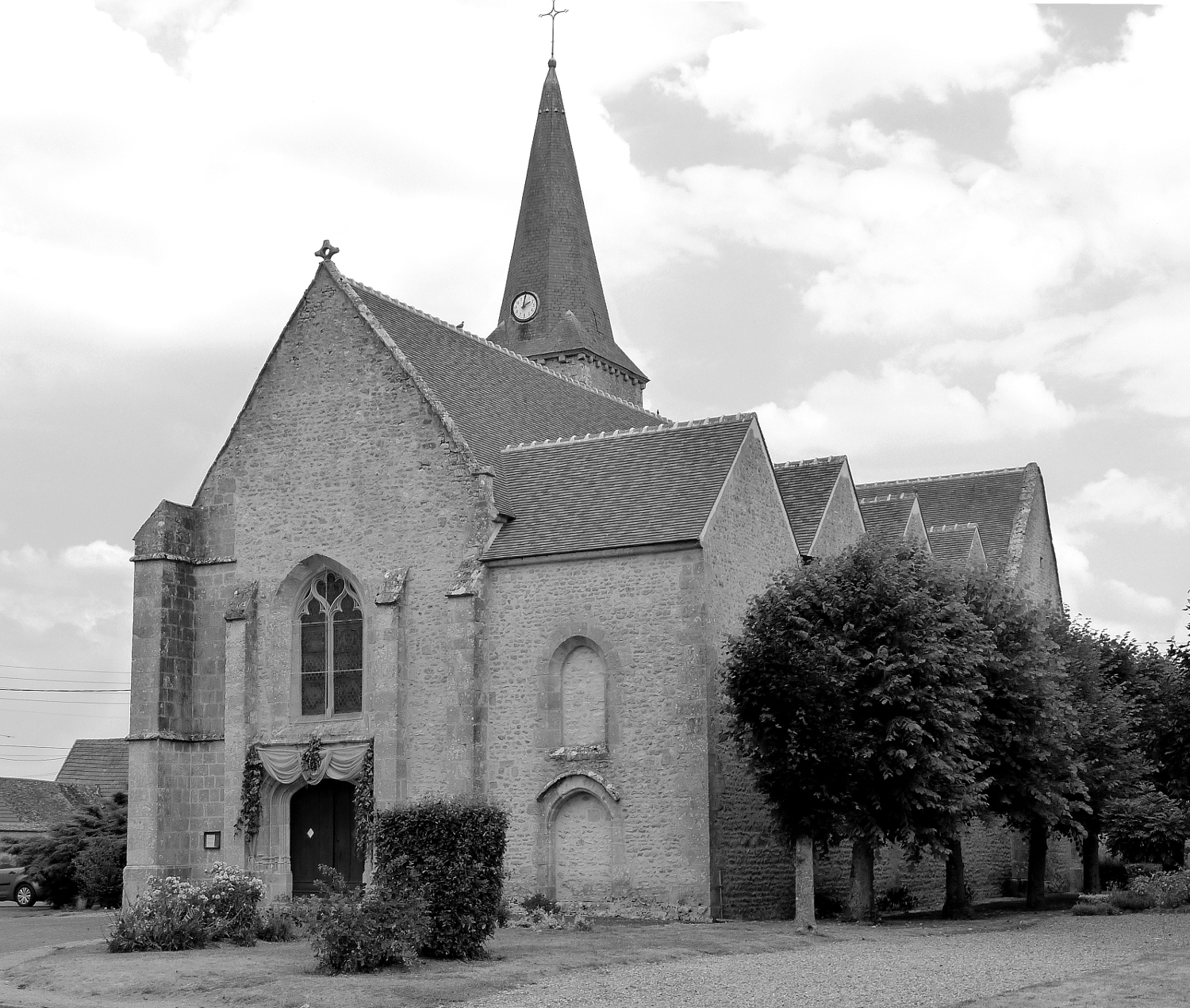
- The church in Louville-la-Chenard

- Coat of arms
- Location of Louville-la-Chenard
- Location within France Location within Centre-Val de Loire
- Coordinates: 48°19′31″N 1°47′19″E
- Country: France
- Region: Centre-Val de Loire
- Department: Eure-et-Loir
- Arrondissement: Chartres
- Canton: Les Villages Vovéens

Government
  - Mayor (2020–2026): Hervé Mardelet
- Area^{1}: 19.51 km^{2} (7.53 sq mi)
- Elevation: 67 m (220 ft)
- Highest elevation: 155 m (509 ft)
- Lowest elevation: 142 m (466 ft)
- Population (2023): 245
  - Density: 12.6/km^{2} (32.5/sq mi)
- Time zone: UTC+01:00 (CET)
  - Summer (DST): UTC+02:00 (CEST)
- INSEE/Postal code: 28215 /28150
- ^{1} French Land Register data, which excludes lakes, ponds, glaciers > 1 km^{2} (0.386 sq mi or 247 acres) and river estuaries.

Louville-la-Chenard (French pronunciation: [luvil la ʃənaʁ]) is a commune in the Eure-et-Loir department in northern France.

== Population ==
Historical population
Year	Pop.	±% p.a.
1968	242	—
1975	193	−3.18%
1982	210	+1.21%
1990	228	+1.03%
1999	239	+0.52%
2007	278	+1.91%
2012	269	−0.66%
2017	252	−1.30%
2023	245	−0.47%
Source: INSEE

== See also ==
- Communes of the Eure-et-Loir department
