= Ymonville =

- Commune
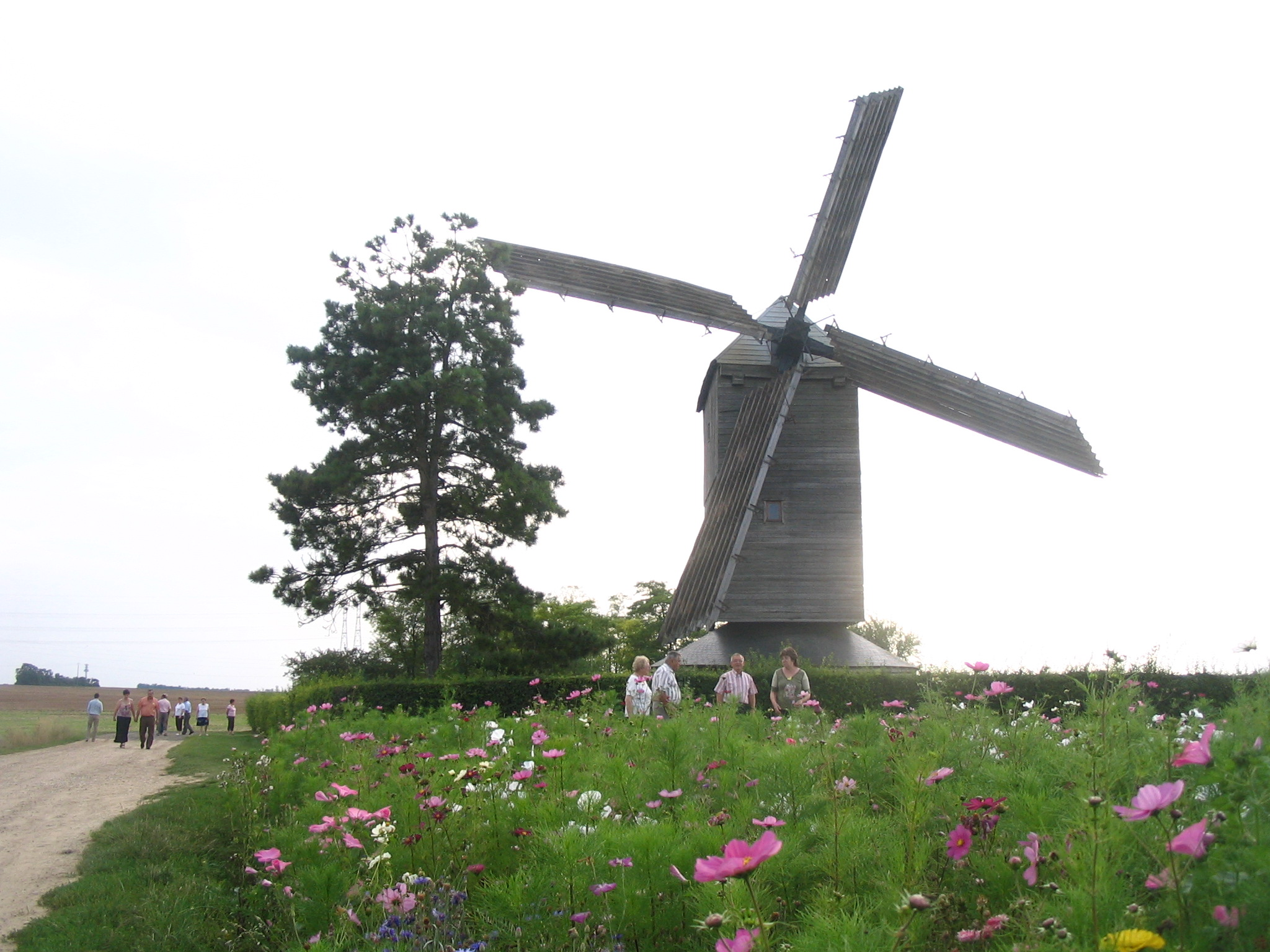
- Moulin de la Garenne post mill

- Coat of arms
- Location of Ymonville
- Location within France Location within Centre-Val de Loire
- Coordinates: 48°15′45″N 1°45′04″E
- Country: France
- Region: Centre-Val de Loire
- Department: Eure-et-Loir
- Arrondissement: Chartres
- Canton: Les Villages Vovéens
- Intercommunality: Cœur de Beauce

Government
  - Mayor (2020–2026): Laurent Cassonnet
- Area^{1}: 20.69 km^{2} (7.99 sq mi)
- Elevation: 143 m (469 ft)
- Highest elevation: 148 m (486 ft)
- Lowest elevation: 120 m (390 ft)
- Population (2023): 475
  - Density: 23.0/km^{2} (59.5/sq mi)
- Time zone: UTC+01:00 (CET)
  - Summer (DST): UTC+02:00 (CEST)
- INSEE/Postal code: 28426 /28150
- ^{1} French Land Register data, which excludes lakes, ponds, glaciers > 1 km^{2} (0.386 sq mi or 247 acres) and river estuaries.

Ymonville (French pronunciation: [imɔ̃vil]) is a commune in the Eure-et-Loir department in northern France.

== Population ==
Historical population
Year	Pop.	±% p.a.
1968	584	—
1975	491	−2.45%
1982	453	−1.14%
1990	460	+0.19%
1999	436	−0.59%
2007	474	+1.05%
2012	489	+0.63%
2017	498	+0.37%
2023	475	−0.78%
Source: INSEE

== See also ==
- Communes of the Eure-et-Loir department
