= Gouillons =

- Commune
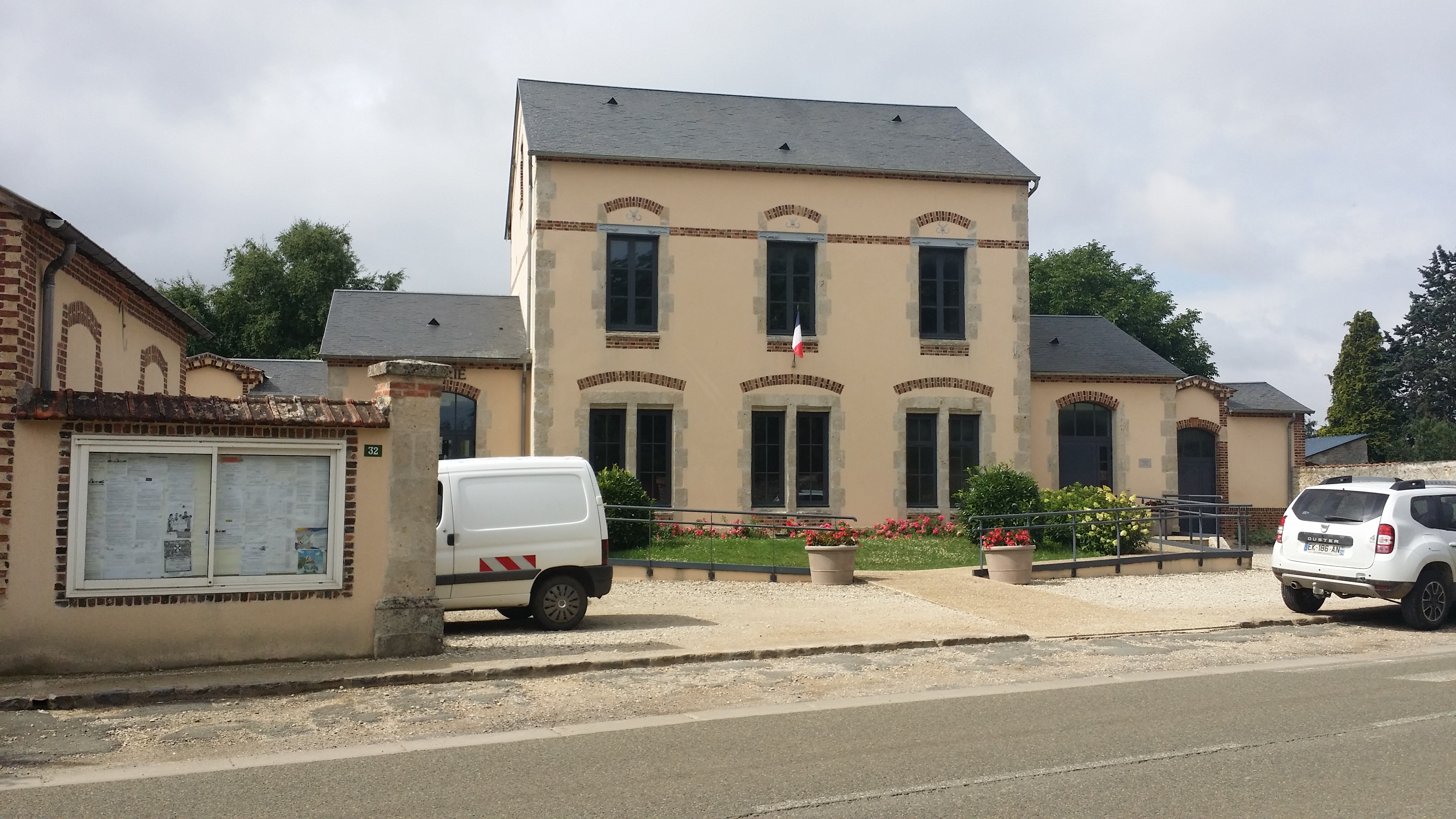
- The town hall in Gouillons

- Coat of arms
- Location of Gouillons
- Location within France Location within Centre-Val de Loire
- Coordinates: 48°20′40″N 1°50′27″E
- Country: France
- Region: Centre-Val de Loire
- Department: Eure-et-Loir
- Arrondissement: Chartres
- Canton: Les Villages Vovéens
- Intercommunality: Cœur de Beauce

Government
  - Mayor (2020–2026): Éric Cochin
- Area^{1}: 12.04 km^{2} (4.65 sq mi)
- Elevation: 149 m (489 ft)
- Highest elevation: 152 m (499 ft)
- Lowest elevation: 139 m (456 ft)
- Population (2023): 335
  - Density: 27.8/km^{2} (72.1/sq mi)
- Time zone: UTC+01:00 (CET)
  - Summer (DST): UTC+02:00 (CEST)
- INSEE/Postal code: 28184 /28310
- ^{1} French Land Register data, which excludes lakes, ponds, glaciers > 1 km^{2} (0.386 sq mi or 247 acres) and river estuaries.

Gouillons (French pronunciation: [ɡujɔ̃]) is a commune in the Eure-et-Loir department in northern France.

== Population ==
Historical population
Year	Pop.	±% p.a.
1968	223	—
1975	224	+0.06%
1982	211	−0.85%
1990	305	+4.71%
1999	317	+0.43%
2007	340	+0.88%
2012	334	−0.36%
2017	338	+0.24%
2023	335	−0.15%
Source: INSEE

== See also ==
- Communes of the Eure-et-Loir department
