= Canton of Les Villages Vovéens =

Coordinates: 48.27°N 1.63°E

The canton of Les Villages Vovéens (before November 2019: canton of Voves) is an administrative division of the Eure-et-Loir department, northern France. Its borders were modified at the French canton reorganisation which came into effect in March 2015. Its seat is in Les Villages Vovéens.

It consists of the following communes:

1. Allonnes
2. Baigneaux
3. Baudreville
4. Bazoches-en-Dunois
5. Bazoches-les-Hautes
6. Beauvilliers
7. Boisville-la-Saint-Père
8. Boncé
9. Bouville
10. Bullainville
11. Cormainville
12. Courbehaye
13. Dambron
14. Éole-en-Beauce
15. Fontenay-sur-Conie
16. Fresnay-l'Évêque
17. Le Gault-Saint-Denis
18. Gommerville
19. Gouillons
20. Guilleville
21. Guillonville
22. Intréville
23. Janville-en-Beauce
24. Levesville-la-Chenard
25. Loigny-la-Bataille
26. Louville-la-Chenard
27. Lumeau
28. Mérouville
29. Meslay-le-Vidame
30. Moutiers
31. Neuville Saint Denis
32. Neuvy-en-Dunois
33. Nottonville
34. Oinville-Saint-Liphard
35. Orgères-en-Beauce
36. Ouarville
37. Péronville
38. Poinville
39. Poupry
40. Prasville
41. Pré-Saint-Évroult
42. Pré-Saint-Martin
43. Réclainville
44. Sancheville
45. Santilly
46. Terminiers
47. Theuville
48. Tillay-le-Péneux
49. Toury
50. Trancrainville
51. Varize
52. Les Villages Vovéens
53. Villars
54. Vitray-en-Beauce
55. Ymonville
