= Réclainville =

- Commune
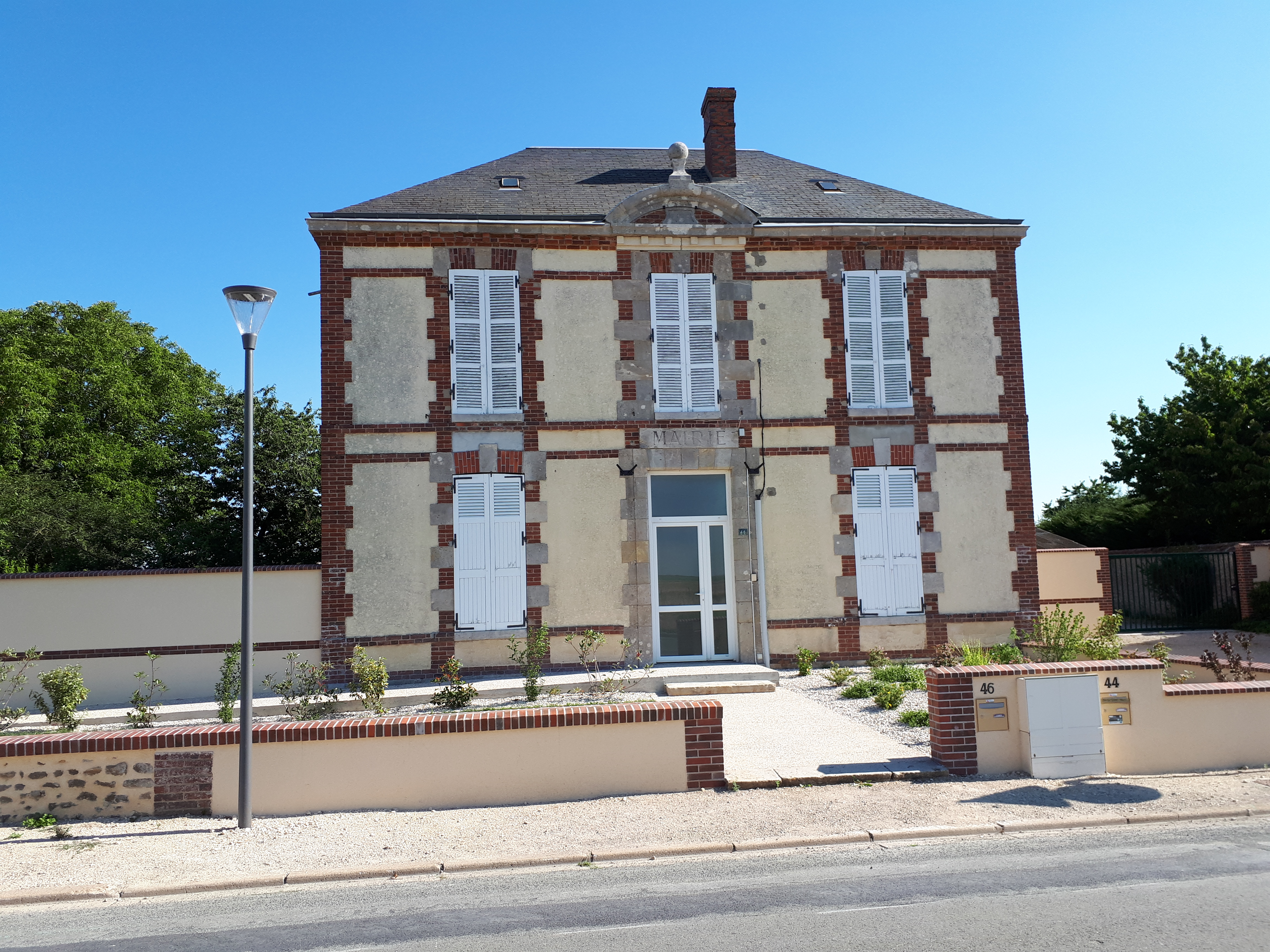
- The town hall in Réclainville

- Coat of arms
- Location of Réclainville
- Location within France Location within Centre-Val de Loire
- Coordinates: 48°20′24″N 1°44′52″E
- Country: France
- Region: Centre-Val de Loire
- Department: Eure-et-Loir
- Arrondissement: Chartres
- Canton: Les Villages Vovéens

Government
  - Mayor (2020–2026): Laëtitia Varet
- Area^{1}: 9.8 km^{2} (3.8 sq mi)
- Elevation: 152 m (499 ft)
- Highest elevation: 154 m (505 ft)
- Lowest elevation: 144 m (472 ft)
- Population (2023): 203
  - Density: 21/km^{2} (54/sq mi)
- Time zone: UTC+01:00 (CET)
  - Summer (DST): UTC+02:00 (CEST)
- INSEE/Postal code: 28313 /28150
- ^{1} French Land Register data, which excludes lakes, ponds, glaciers > 1 km^{2} (0.386 sq mi or 247 acres) and river estuaries.

Réclainville (French pronunciation: [ʁeklɛ̃vil]) is a commune in the Eure-et-Loir department in northern France.

== Population ==
Historical population
Year	Pop.	±% p.a.
1968	132	—
1975	115	−1.95%
1982	104	−1.43%
1990	140	+3.79%
1999	143	+0.24%
2007	140	−0.26%
2012	191	+6.41%
2017	190	−0.10%
2023	203	+1.11%
Source: INSEE

== See also ==
- Communes of the Eure-et-Loir department
