= Baigneaux, Eure-et-Loir =

Baigneaux
- Commune
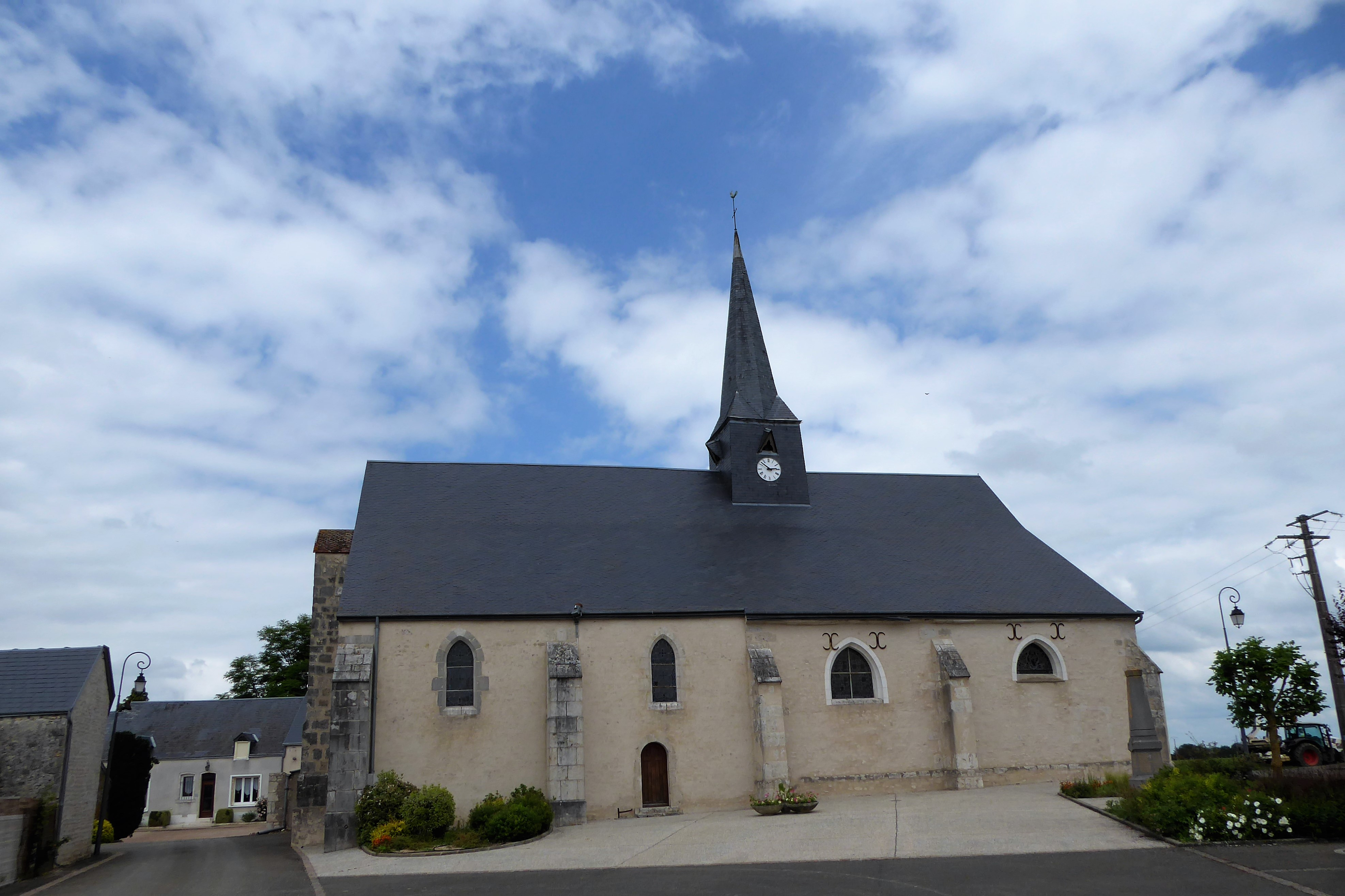
- The church in Baigneaux
- Location of Baigneaux
- Location within France Location within Centre-Val de Loire
- Coordinates: 48°07′45″N 1°49′01″E
- Country: France
- Region: Centre-Val de Loire
- Department: Eure-et-Loir
- Arrondissement: Châteaudun
- Canton: Les Villages Vovéens
- Intercommunality: Cœur de Beauce

Government
  - Mayor (2020–2026): Claude Pierre
- Area^{1}: 11.78 km^{2} (4.55 sq mi)
- Elevation: 122 m (400 ft)
- Highest elevation: 136 m (446 ft)
- Lowest elevation: 119 m (390 ft)
- Population (2023): 232
  - Density: 19.7/km^{2} (51.0/sq mi)
- Time zone: UTC+01:00 (CET)
  - Summer (DST): UTC+02:00 (CEST)
- INSEE/Postal code: 28019 /28140
- ^{1} French Land Register data, which excludes lakes, ponds, glaciers > 1 km^{2} (0.386 sq mi or 247 acres) and river estuaries.

Baigneaux (French pronunciation: [bɛɲo]) is a commune in the Eure-et-Loir department in northern France.

== Population ==
Historical population
Year	Pop.	±% p.a.
1968	268	—
1975	240	−1.56%
1982	198	−2.71%
1990	204	+0.37%
1999	196	−0.44%
2007	218	+1.34%
2012	239	+1.86%
2017	225	−1.20%
2023	232	+0.51%
Source: INSEE

== See also ==
- Communes of the Eure-et-Loir department
