= Nottonville =

- Commune
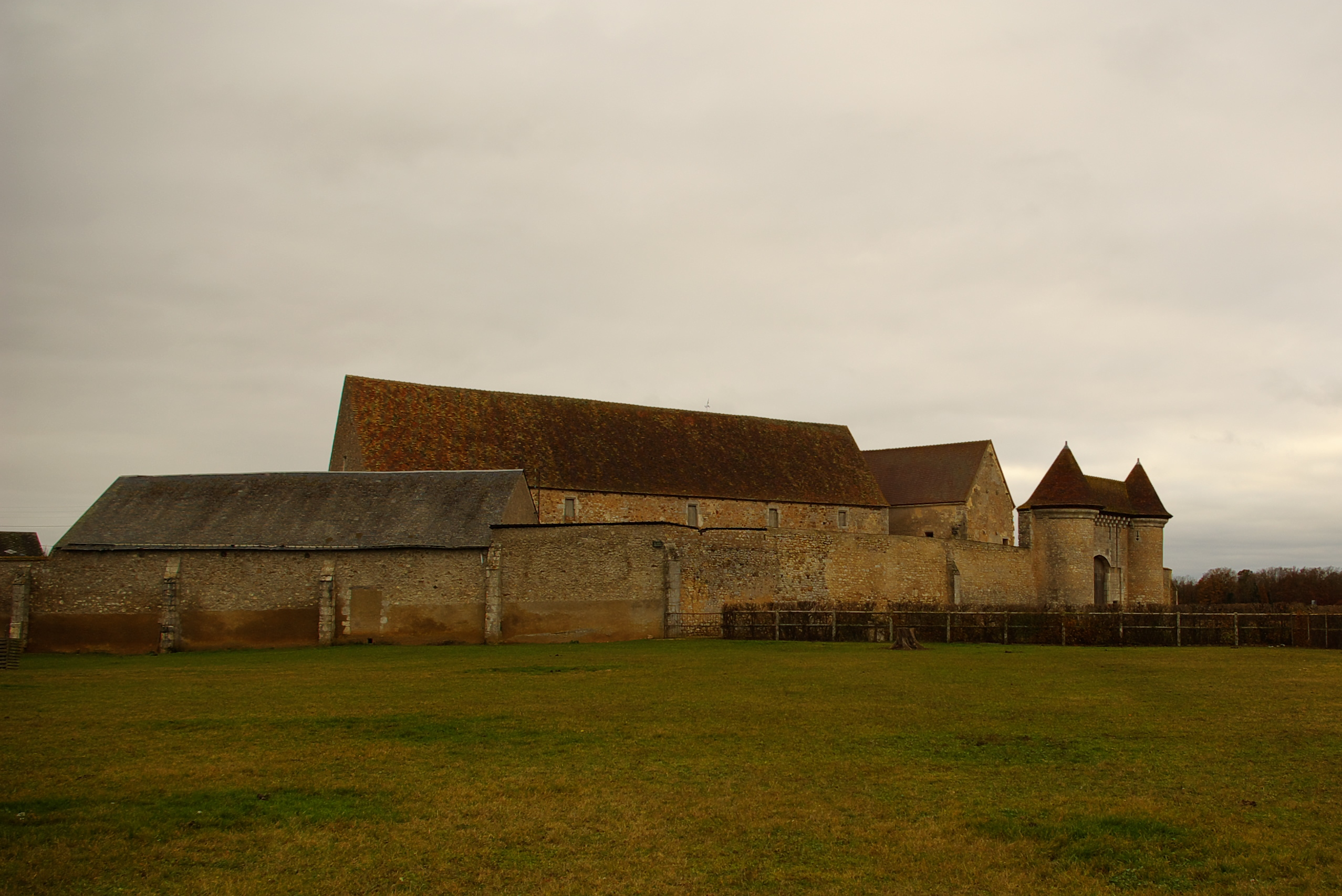
- Abbey
- Location of Nottonville
- Location within France Location within Centre-Val de Loire
- Coordinates: 48°06′47″N 1°30′23″E
- Country: France
- Region: Centre-Val de Loire
- Department: Eure-et-Loir
- Arrondissement: Châteaudun
- Canton: Les Villages Vovéens

Government
  - Mayor (2020–2026): Mathilde Weill
- Area^{1}: 24.74 km^{2} (9.55 sq mi)
- Elevation: 130 m (430 ft)
- Highest elevation: 143 m (469 ft)
- Lowest elevation: 112 m (367 ft)
- Population (2023): 279
  - Density: 11.3/km^{2} (29.2/sq mi)
- Time zone: UTC+01:00 (CET)
  - Summer (DST): UTC+02:00 (CEST)
- INSEE/Postal code: 28283 /28140
- ^{1} French Land Register data, which excludes lakes, ponds, glaciers > 1 km^{2} (0.386 sq mi or 247 acres) and river estuaries.

Nottonville (French pronunciation: [nɔtɔ̃vil]) is a commune in the Eure-et-Loir department in northern France.

== Population ==
Historical population
Year	Pop.	±% p.a.
1968	400	—
1975	343	−2.17%
1982	325	−0.77%
1990	275	−2.07%
1999	252	−0.97%
2007	275	+1.10%
2012	330	+3.71%
2017	304	−1.63%
2023	279	−1.42%
Source: INSEE

== See also ==
- Communes of the Eure-et-Loir department
