= Guillonville =

- Commune
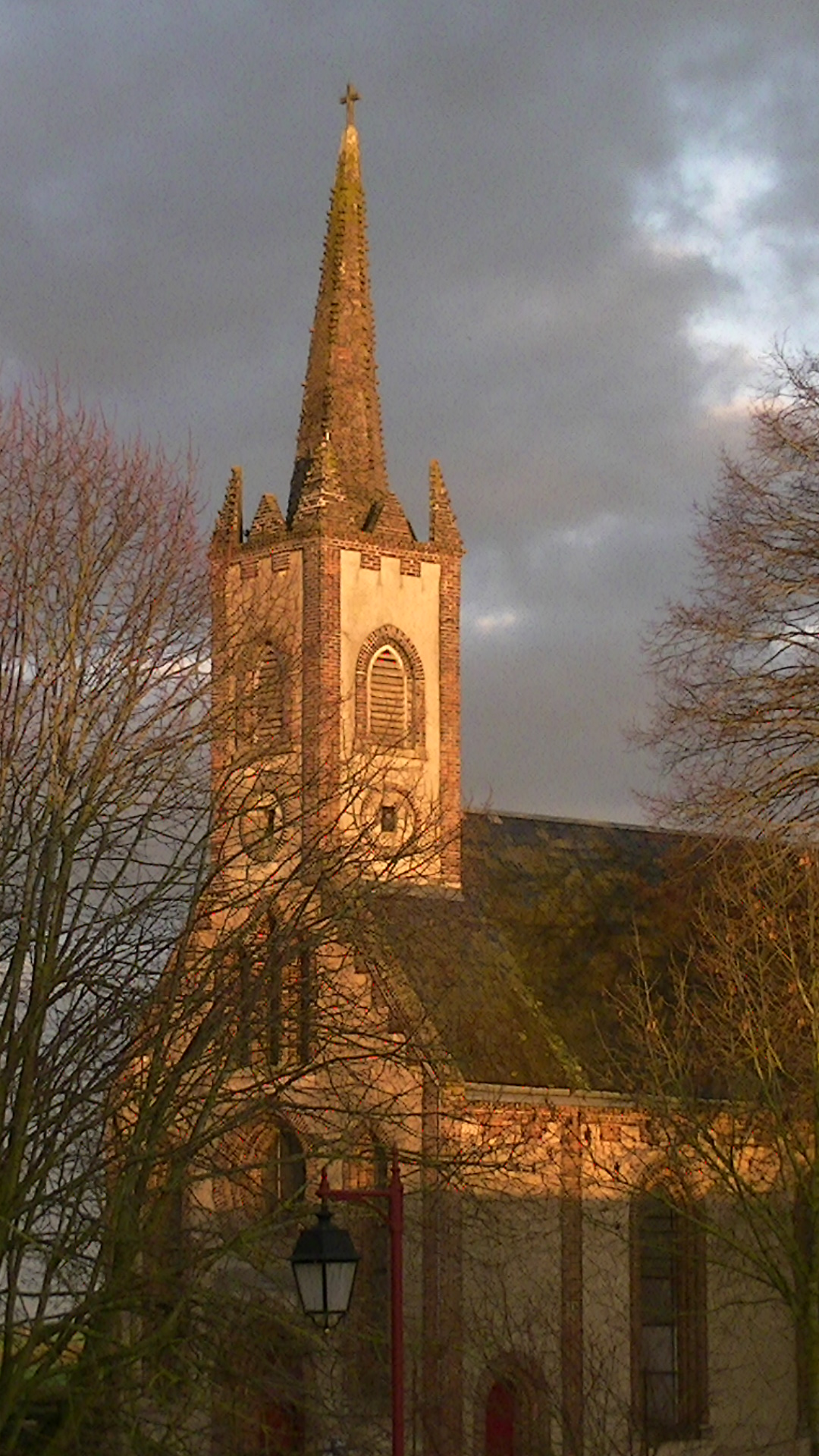
- The Protestant church in Guillonville
- Location of Guillonville
- Location within France Location within Centre-Val de Loire
- Coordinates: 48°05′30″N 1°39′47″E
- Country: France
- Region: Centre-Val de Loire
- Department: Eure-et-Loir
- Arrondissement: Châteaudun
- Canton: Les Villages Vovéens
- Intercommunality: Cœur de Beauce

Government
  - Mayor (2020–2026): François Cottin
- Area^{1}: 27.15 km^{2} (10.48 sq mi)
- Elevation: 136 m (446 ft)
- Highest elevation: 140 m (460 ft)
- Lowest elevation: 113 m (371 ft)
- Population (2023): 459
  - Density: 16.9/km^{2} (43.8/sq mi)
- Time zone: UTC+01:00 (CET)
  - Summer (DST): UTC+02:00 (CEST)
- INSEE/Postal code: 28190 /28140
- ^{1} French Land Register data, which excludes lakes, ponds, glaciers > 1 km^{2} (0.386 sq mi or 247 acres) and river estuaries.

Guillonville is a commune in the Eure-et-Loir department in northern France.

== Population ==
Historical population
Year	Pop.	±% p.a.
1968	502	—
1975	463	−1.15%
1982	487	+0.72%
1990	434	−1.43%
1999	419	−0.39%
2007	453	+0.98%
2012	442	−0.49%
2017	446	+0.18%
2023	459	+0.48%
Source: INSEE

== See also ==
- Communes of the Eure-et-Loir department
