= Bazoches-les-Hautes =

- Commune
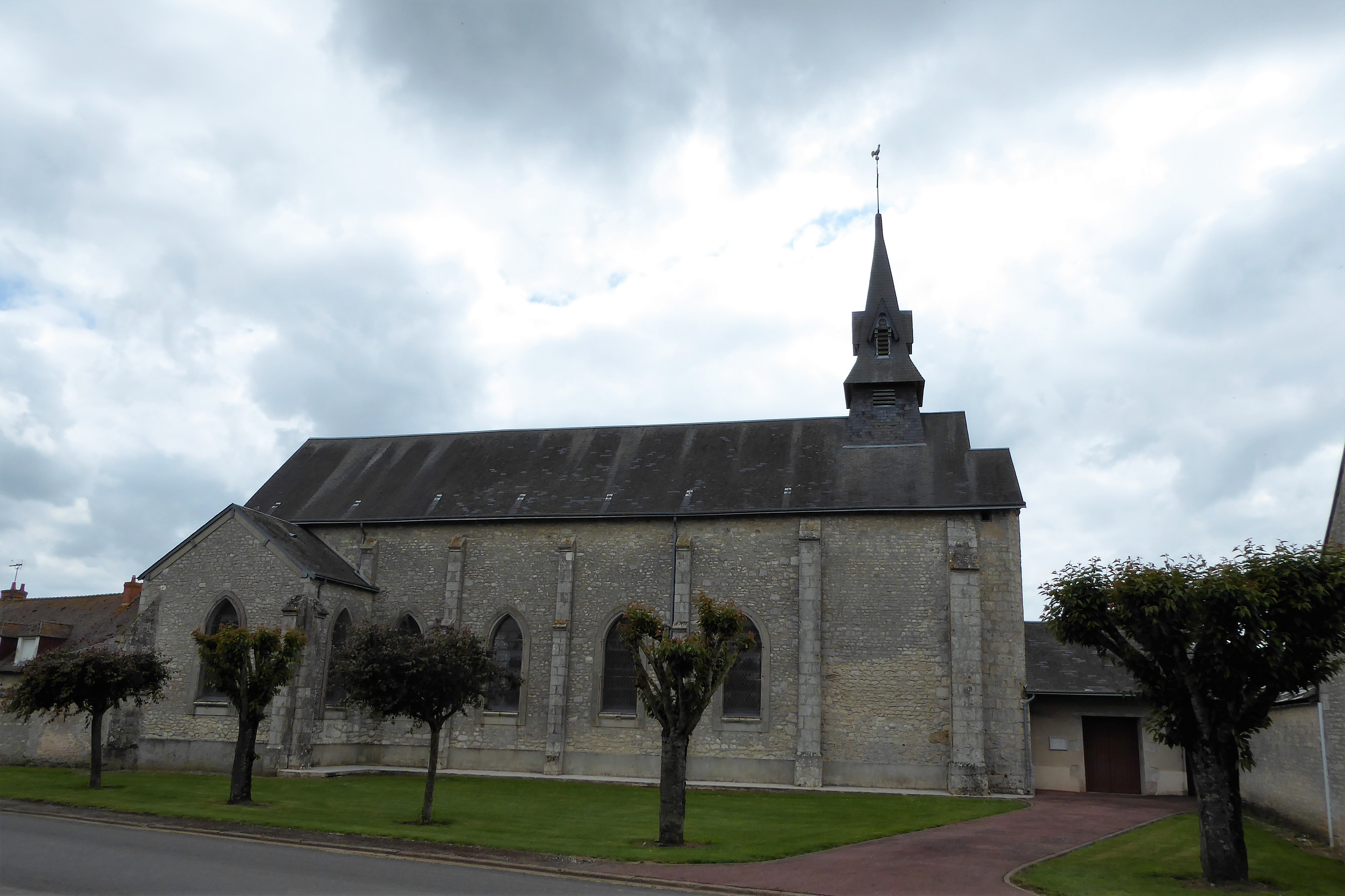
- The church in Bazoches-les-Hautes
- Location of Bazoches-les-Hautes
- Location within France Location within Centre-Val de Loire
- Coordinates: 48°09′31″N 1°48′32″E
- Country: France
- Region: Centre-Val de Loire
- Department: Eure-et-Loir
- Arrondissement: Châteaudun
- Canton: Les Villages Vovéens
- Intercommunality: Cœur de Beauce

Government
  - Mayor (2020–2026): Isabelle Doret
- Area^{1}: 16.98 km^{2} (6.56 sq mi)
- Elevation: 135 m (443 ft)
- Highest elevation: 141 m (463 ft)
- Lowest elevation: 120 m (390 ft)
- Population (2023): 330
  - Density: 19/km^{2} (50/sq mi)
- Time zone: UTC+01:00 (CET)
  - Summer (DST): UTC+02:00 (CEST)
- INSEE/Postal code: 28029 /28140
- ^{1} French Land Register data, which excludes lakes, ponds, glaciers > 1 km^{2} (0.386 sq mi or 247 acres) and river estuaries.

Bazoches-les-Hautes (French pronunciation: [bazɔʃ le ot]) is a commune in the Eure-et-Loir department in northern France.

== Population ==
Historical population
Year	Pop.	±% p.a.
1968	502	—
1975	405	−3.02%
1982	265	−5.88%
1990	300	+1.56%
1999	289	−0.41%
2007	292	+0.13%
2012	359	+4.22%
2017	309	−2.96%
2023	330	+1.10%
Source: INSEE

== See also ==
- Communes of the Eure-et-Loir department
