= Moutiers, Eure-et-Loir =

Moutiers
- Commune
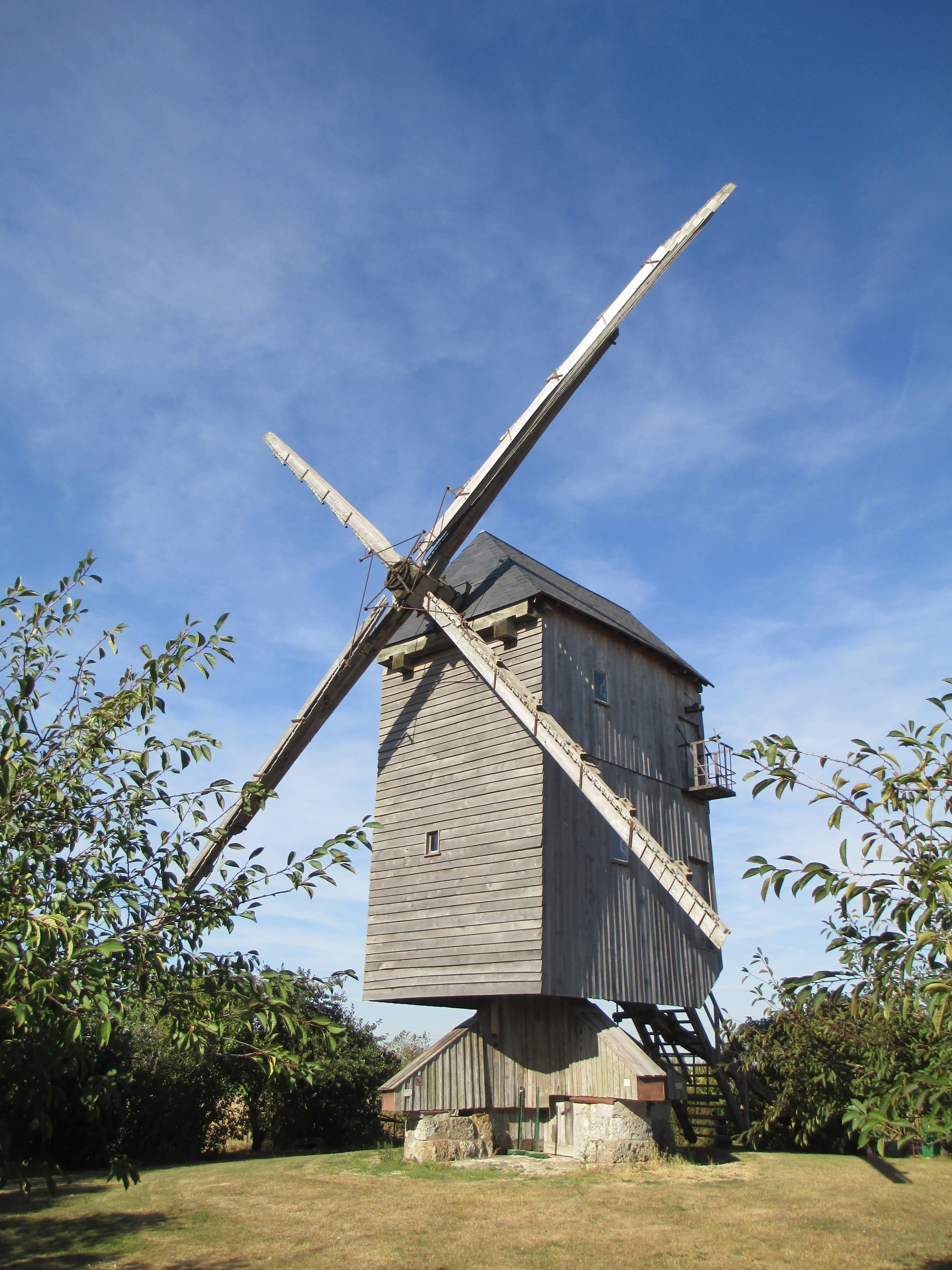
- The Chesnay windmill in Moutiers
- Location of Moutiers
- Location within France Location within Centre-Val de Loire
- Coordinates: 48°17′53″N 1°46′39″E
- Country: France
- Region: Centre-Val de Loire
- Department: Eure-et-Loir
- Arrondissement: Chartres
- Canton: Les Villages Vovéens
- Intercommunality: Cœur de Beauce

Government
  - Mayor (2020–2026): Patrick Chapart
- Area^{1}: 21.2 km^{2} (8.2 sq mi)
- Elevation: 151 m (495 ft)
- Highest elevation: 154 m (505 ft)
- Lowest elevation: 138 m (453 ft)
- Population (2023): 246
  - Density: 11.6/km^{2} (30.1/sq mi)
- Time zone: UTC+01:00 (CET)
  - Summer (DST): UTC+02:00 (CEST)
- INSEE/Postal code: 28274 /28150
- ^{1} French Land Register data, which excludes lakes, ponds, glaciers > 1 km^{2} (0.386 sq mi or 247 acres) and river estuaries.

Moutiers (French pronunciation: [mutje]) is a commune in the Eure-et-Loir department in northern France.

== Population ==
Historical population
Year	Pop.	±% p.a.
1968	237	—
1975	207	−1.91%
1982	203	−0.28%
1990	205	+0.12%
1999	218	+0.69%
2007	235	+0.94%
2012	256	+1.73%
2017	249	−0.55%
2023	246	−0.20%
Source: INSEE

== See also ==
- Communes of the Eure-et-Loir department
