= Courbehaye =

- Commune
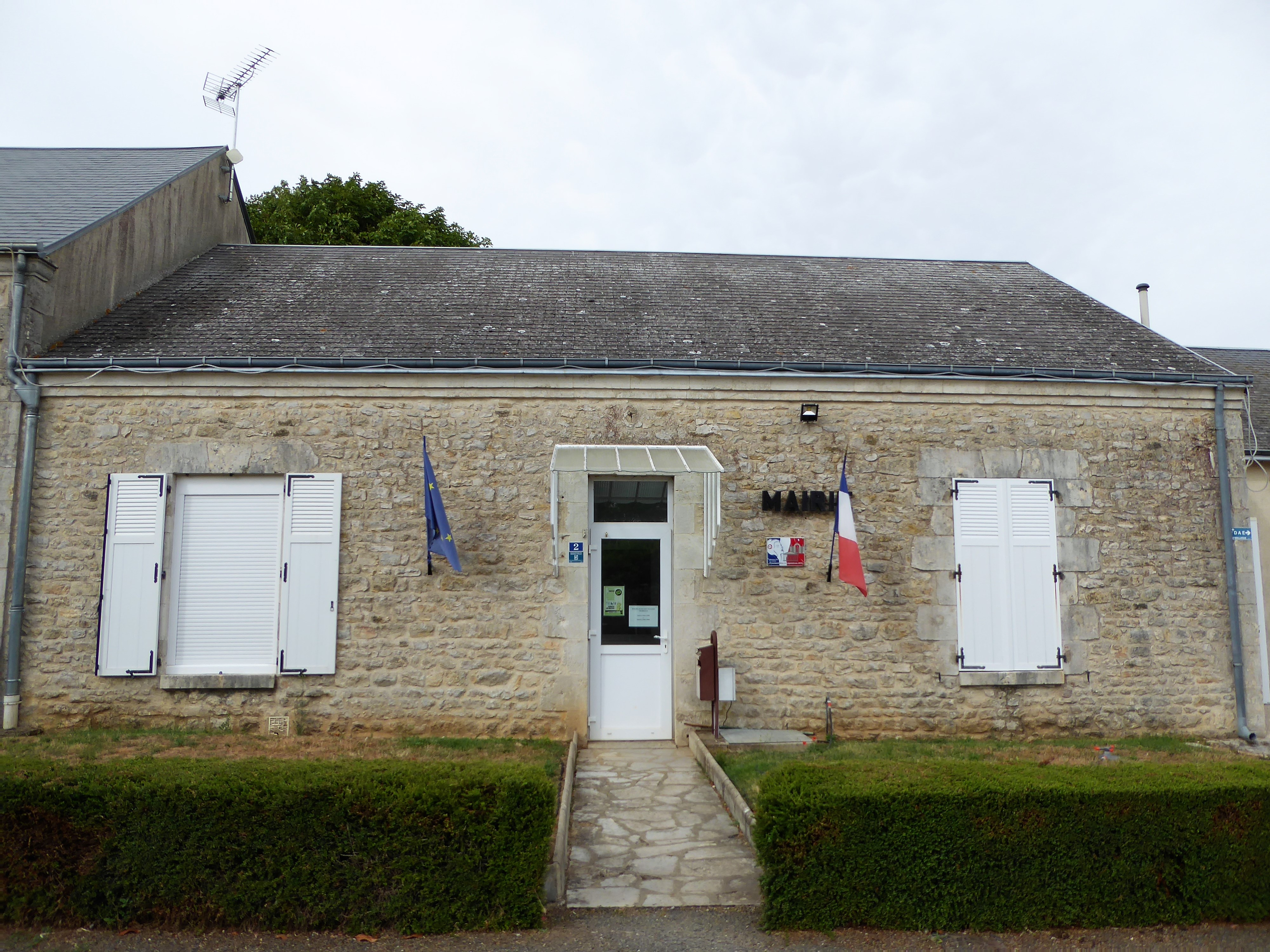
- Town hall
- Location of Courbehaye
- Location within France Location within Centre-Val de Loire
- Coordinates: 48°09′32″N 1°36′36″E
- Country: France
- Region: Centre-Val de Loire
- Department: Eure-et-Loir
- Arrondissement: Châteaudun
- Canton: Les Villages Vovéens
- Intercommunality: Cœur de Beauce

Government
  - Mayor (2020–2026): Fulbert Leveillard
- Area^{1}: 19.7 km^{2} (7.6 sq mi)
- Elevation: 131 m (430 ft)
- Highest elevation: 141 m (463 ft)
- Lowest elevation: 113 m (371 ft)
- Population (2023): 138
  - Density: 7.01/km^{2} (18.1/sq mi)
- Time zone: UTC+01:00 (CET)
  - Summer (DST): UTC+02:00 (CEST)
- INSEE/Postal code: 28114 /28140
- ^{1} French Land Register data, which excludes lakes, ponds, glaciers > 1 km^{2} (0.386 sq mi or 247 acres) and river estuaries.

Courbehaye (French pronunciation: [kuʁbə.aj]) is a commune in the Eure-et-Loir department in northern France.

== Population ==
Historical population
Year	Pop.	±% p.a.
1968	174	—
1975	161	−1.10%
1982	137	−2.28%
1990	116	−2.06%
1999	129	+1.19%
2007	119	−1.00%
2012	133	+2.25%
2017	137	+0.59%
2023	138	+0.12%
Source: INSEE

== See also ==
- Communes of the Eure-et-Loir department
