= Saint-Ouen-Marchefroy =

- Commune
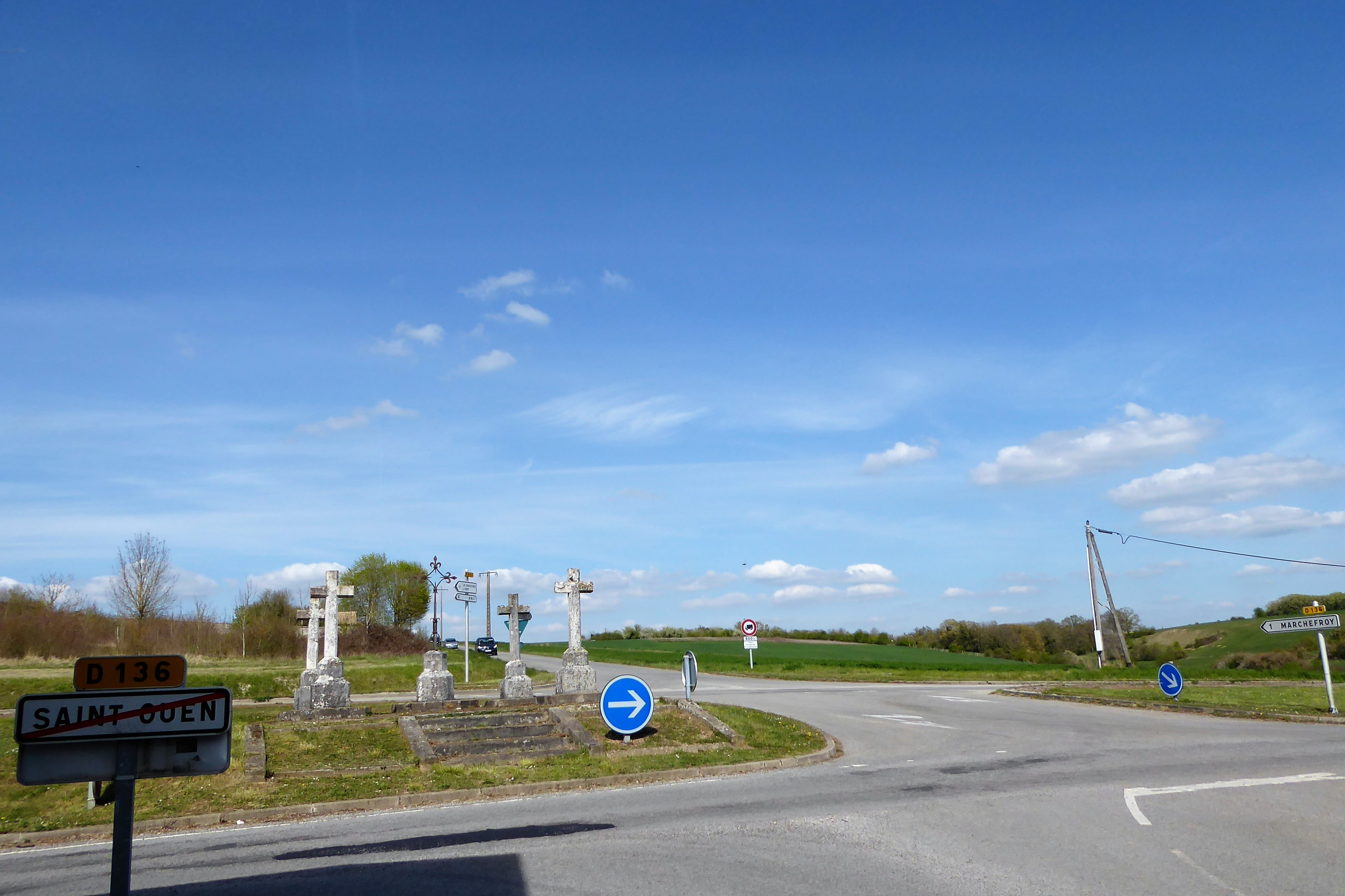
- The crossroads with five crosses in Saint-Ouen-Marchefroy

- Coat of arms
- Location of Saint-Ouen-Marchefroy
- Location within France Location within Centre-Val de Loire
- Coordinates: 48°51′30″N 1°32′00″E
- Country: France
- Region: Centre-Val de Loire
- Department: Eure-et-Loir
- Arrondissement: Dreux
- Canton: Anet
- Intercommunality: CA Pays de Dreux

Government
  - Mayor (2020–2026): Philippe Dumas
- Area^{1}: 9.21 km^{2} (3.56 sq mi)
- Elevation: 130 m (430 ft)
- Highest elevation: 161 m (528 ft)
- Lowest elevation: 72 m (236 ft)
- Population (2023): 290
  - Density: 31/km^{2} (82/sq mi)
- Time zone: UTC+01:00 (CET)
  - Summer (DST): UTC+02:00 (CEST)
- INSEE/Postal code: 28355 /28260
- ^{1} French Land Register data, which excludes lakes, ponds, glaciers > 1 km^{2} (0.386 sq mi or 247 acres) and river estuaries.

Saint-Ouen-Marchefroy (French pronunciation: [sɛ̃.t‿wɛ̃ maʁʃəfʁwa]) is a commune in the Eure-et-Loir department in northern France.

== Population ==
Historical population
Year	Pop.	±% p.a.
1968	198	—
1975	191	−0.51%
1982	193	+0.15%
1990	311	+6.15%
1999	294	−0.62%
2007	332	+1.53%
2012	313	−1.17%
2017	295	−1.18%
2023	290	−0.28%
Source: INSEE

== Sights ==
- Five Crosses: monument to five brothers killed in combat in the 11th century at the intersection of route D933 (Route de Houdan) and D136 north toward Marchefroy. This monument is depicted on the coat of arms of the commune. Another notable "Five Crosses" monument exists at Ploubezre.

== See also ==
- Communes of the Eure-et-Loir department
