= Arrondissement of Dreux =

Coordinates: 48.73°N 1.37°E

Dreux
- Arrondissement
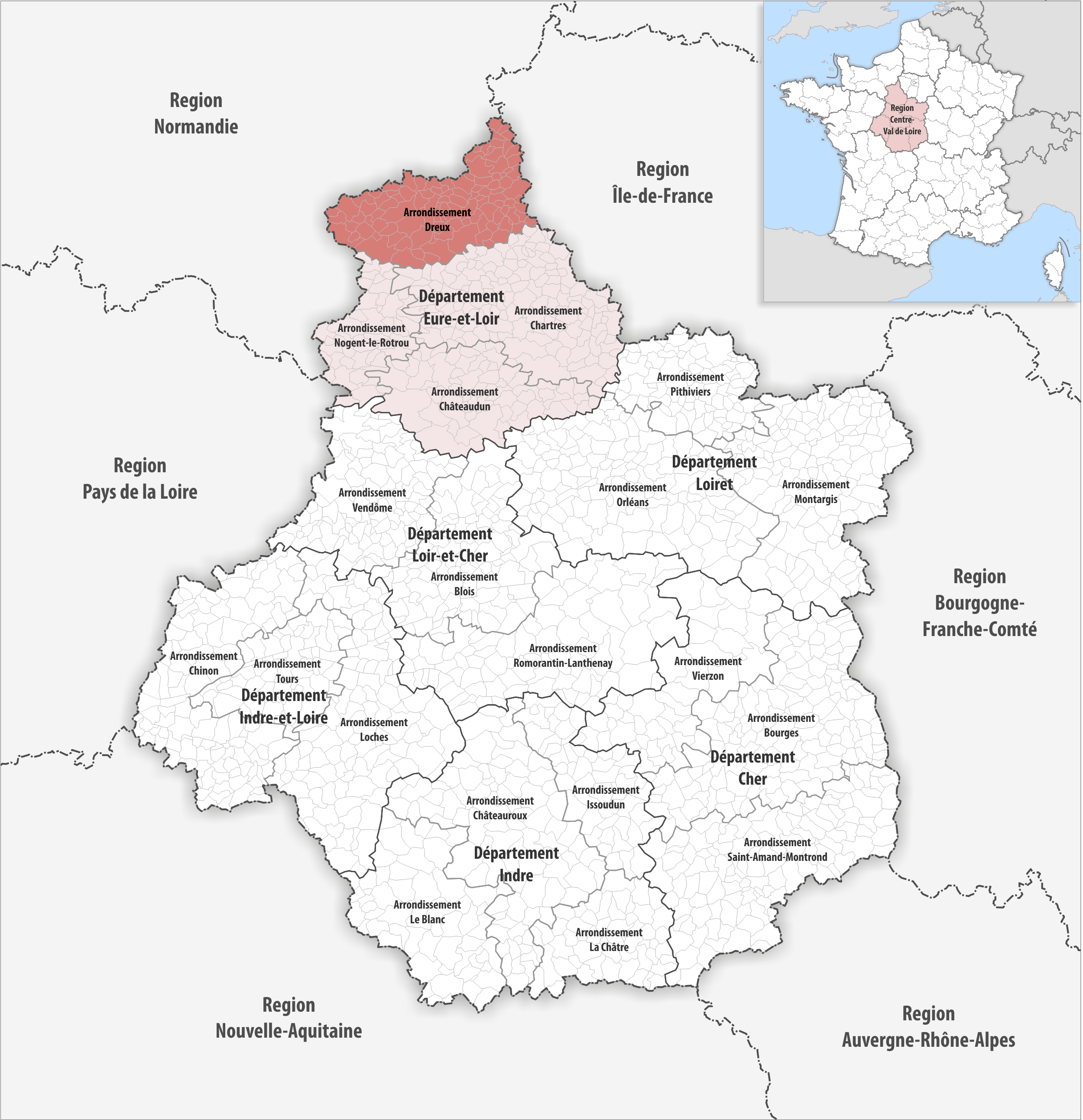
- Location within the region Centre-Val de Loire
- Country: France
- Region: Centre-Val de Loire
- Department: Eure-et-Loir
- No. of communes: 108
- Area: 1,500.5 km^{2} (579.3 sq mi)
- Population (2023): 130,373
  - Density: 86.886/km^{2} (225.03/sq mi)
- INSEE code: 283

The arrondissement of Dreux is an arrondissement of France in the Eure-et-Loir department in the Centre-Val de Loire region. It has 108 communes. Its population is 129,336 (2021), and its area is 1,500.5 km^{2} (579.3 sq mi).

== Composition ==
The communes of the arrondissement of Dreux, and their INSEE codes, are:

1. Abondant (28001)
2. Allainville (28003)
3. Anet (28007)
4. Ardelles (28008)
5. Aunay-sous-Crécy (28014)
6. Beauche (28030)
7. Berchères-sur-Vesgre (28036)
8. Bérou-la-Mulotière (28037)
9. Boissy-en-Drouais (28045)
10. Boissy-lès-Perche (28046)
11. Boncourt (28050)
12. Le Boullay-les-Deux-Églises (28053)
13. Le Boullay-Mivoye (28054)
14. Le Boullay-Thierry (28055)
15. Boutigny-Prouais (28056)
16. Bréchamps (28058)
17. Brezolles (28059)
18. Broué (28062)
19. Bû (28064)
20. La Chapelle-Forainvilliers (28076)
21. La Chapelle-Fortin (28077)
22. Charpont (28082)
23. Châtaincourt (28087)
24. Châteauneuf-en-Thymerais (28089)
25. Les Châtelets (28090)
26. Chaudon (28094)
27. La Chaussée-d'Ivry (28096)
28. Cherisy (28098)
29. Coulombs (28113)
30. Crécy-Couvé (28117)
31. Croisilles (28118)
32. Crucey-Villages (28120)
33. Dampierre-sur-Avre (28124)
34. Digny (28130)
35. Dreux (28134)
36. Écluzelles (28136)
37. Escorpain (28143)
38. Faverolles (28146)
39. Favières (28147)
40. La Ferté-Vidame (28149)
41. Fessanvilliers-Mattanvilliers (28151)
42. Fontaine-les-Ribouts (28155)
43. La Framboisière (28159)
44. Garancières-en-Drouais (28170)
45. Garnay (28171)
46. Germainville (28178)
47. Gilles (28180)
48. Goussainville (28185)
49. Guainville (28187)
50. Havelu (28193)
51. Jaudrais (28200)
52. Lamblore (28202)
53. Laons (28206)
54. Lormaye (28213)
55. Louvilliers-en-Drouais (28216)
56. Louvilliers-lès-Perche (28217)
57. Luray (28223)
58. Maillebois (28226)
59. La Mancelière (28231)
60. Marchezais (28235)
61. Marville-Moutiers-Brûlé (28239)
62. Le Mesnil-Simon (28247)
63. Le Mesnil-Thomas (28248)
64. Mézières-en-Drouais (28251)
65. Montigny-sur-Avre (28263)
66. Montreuil (28267)
67. Morvilliers (28271)
68. Néron (28275)
69. Nogent-le-Roi (28279)
70. Ormoy (28289)
71. Ouerre (28292)
72. Oulins (28293)
73. Les Pinthières (28299)
74. Prudemanche (28308)
75. La Puisaye (28310)
76. Puiseux (28312)
77. Les Ressuintes (28314)
78. Revercourt (28315)
79. Rohaire (28316)
80. Rouvres (28321)
81. Rueil-la-Gadelière (28322)
82. Saint-Ange-et-Torçay (28323)
83. Sainte-Gemme-Moronval (28332)
84. Saint-Jean-de-Rebervilliers (28341)
85. Saint-Laurent-la-Gâtine (28343)
86. Saint-Lubin-de-Cravant (28346)
87. Saint-Lubin-de-la-Haye (28347)
88. Saint-Lubin-des-Joncherets (28348)
89. Saint-Lucien (28349)
90. Saint-Maixme-Hauterive (28351)
91. Saint-Ouen-Marchefroy (28355)
92. Saint-Rémy-sur-Avre (28359)
93. Saint-Sauveur-Marville (28360)
94. La Saucelle (28368)
95. Saulnières (28369)
96. Saussay (28371)
97. Senantes (28372)
98. Senonches (28373)
99. Serazereux (28374)
100. Serville (28375)
101. Sorel-Moussel (28377)
102. Thimert-Gâtelles (28386)
103. Tremblay-les-Villages (28393)
104. Tréon (28394)
105. Vernouillet (28404)
106. Vert-en-Drouais (28405)
107. Villemeux-sur-Eure (28415)
108. Villiers-le-Morhier (28417)

== History ==
The arrondissement of Dreux was created in 1800.

As a result of the reorganisation of the cantons of France which came into effect in 2015, the borders of the cantons are no longer related to the borders of the arrondissements. The cantons of the arrondissement of Dreux were, as of January 2015:

1. Anet
2. Brezolles
3. Châteauneuf-en-Thymerais
4. Dreux-Est
5. Dreux-Ouest
6. Dreux-Sud
7. La Ferté-Vidame
8. Nogent-le-Roi
9. Senonches
