= Michèle Foison =

French composer

Michèle Foison (born 6 June 1942 Bois-Colombes) is a French composer, conductor and teacher.

== Life ==
She studied at the Paris Conservatory from 1961 to 1972. She obtained several first prizes, in harmony, where she studied with Georges Dandelot, counterpoint, where she studied with Alain Weber, fugue, where she studied with Yvonne Desportes, Ondes Martenot, where she studied with Maurice Martenot, and musical composition, where she studied with Olivier Messiaen.

In 1970, she was awarded the Certificate for the management of national music schools. She received the Georges Bizet prize from the Institut de France for Gemme d'étoiles.

In 1972, she won the Casa de Velázquez prize.

Foison then made a career as director of conservatories, notably in Dreux, Houdan, Alençon, or at the head of the municipal conservatory of Paris-Center. She also created the Bû artistic center and directed, as conductor, numerous concerts in France and abroad.

As a composer, she is the author of several works for organ, Martenot waves, percussion, choirs, orchestra and soloists.
