= Boutigny =

Boutigny may refer to several communes in France:

- Boutigny, Seine-et-Marne, in Seine-et-Marne département
- Boutigny-Prouais, a commune in the Eure-et-Loir département
- Boutigny-sur-Essonne, a commune in the Essonne département, a suburb of Paris
