= Rudolf Pfnor =

19th-century German and French engraver

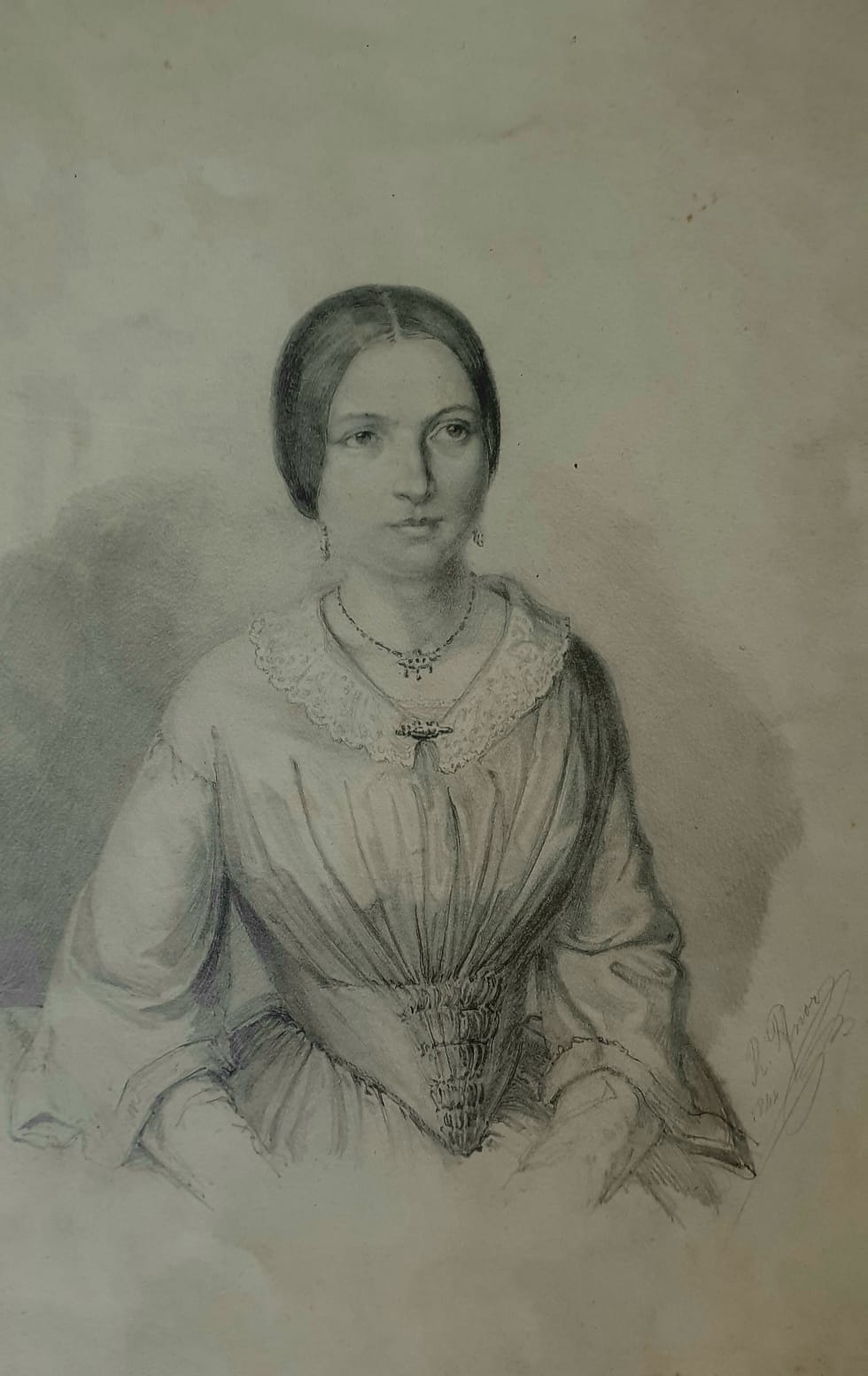
This drawing by Pfnor of a young woman in festive dress is from 1844, which means it was probably created in Hesse.

Rudolf Pfnor later spelt Rodolphe Pfnor (* 1824 in Darmstadt; † 1909 in Paris) was a German–French artist who specialised mainly in copper and steel engraving.

== Life ==
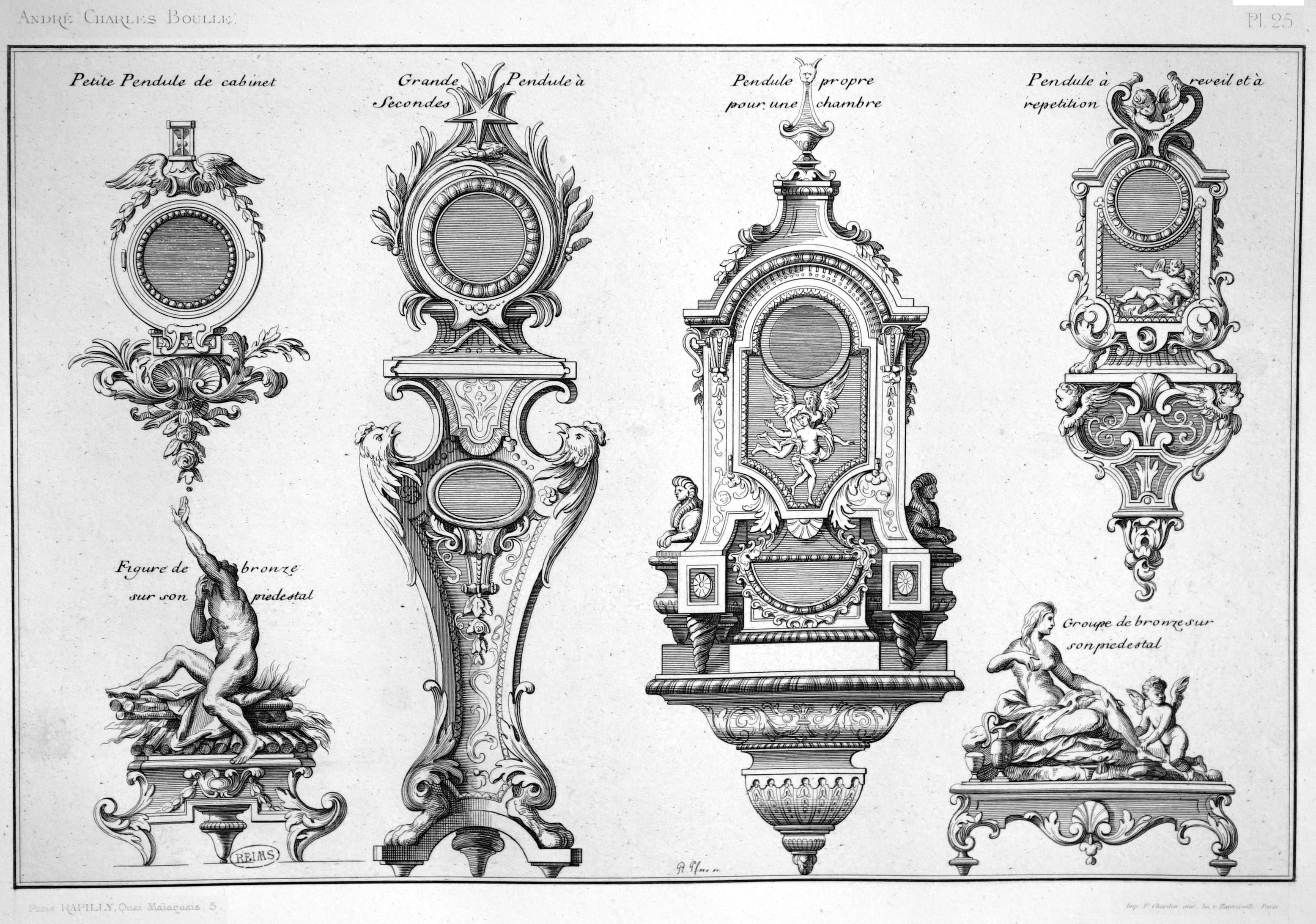
Illustration from Recueil d'estampes relatives à l'ornementation des appartements aux XVIe, XVIIe et XVIIIe siècles.

Pfnor was born in Darmstadt, Grand Duchy of Hesse, in 1824 as the son of the inventor and woodcutter Johann Wilhelm Gottlieb Pfnor (19 December 1792 – 9 June 1869); in 1846 he moved to Paris.

There he became a pioneer of the arts industriels, i.e. the idea of arts and crafts. Pfnor also excelled as a publicist in this field. In this context, he collaborated with intellectuals of his time, such as Anatole France. He became famous for his graphic documentations of castles such as those of Anet, Fountainebleau and Heidelberg.

Pfnor's graphic work is actively traded on the art market. By contrast, Pfnor's drawings are rare on the art market.

His work can be found in the British Museum, among other places.

== Literature (selection) ==
- Monographie du château de Heidelberg. Paris: A. Morel, 1859.
- Recueil d'estampes relatives à l'ornementation des appartements aux XVIe, XVIIe et XVIIIe siècles. Paris: Rapilly 1863–1871.
- Histoire et description du château d'Anet : depuis le dixième siècle jusqu'à nos jours : précédée d'une notice sur un sommaire chronologique sur tous les seigneurs qui ont habité le château et sur ses propriétaires et contenant une étude sur Diane de Poitiers. Paris : Imprimé par D. Jouaust [...] pour l'auteur 1875.
- (with a preface by Anatole France:) Guide artistique & historique au Palais de Fontainebleau. Paris: A. Daly 1889.
