= Germainville =

- Commune
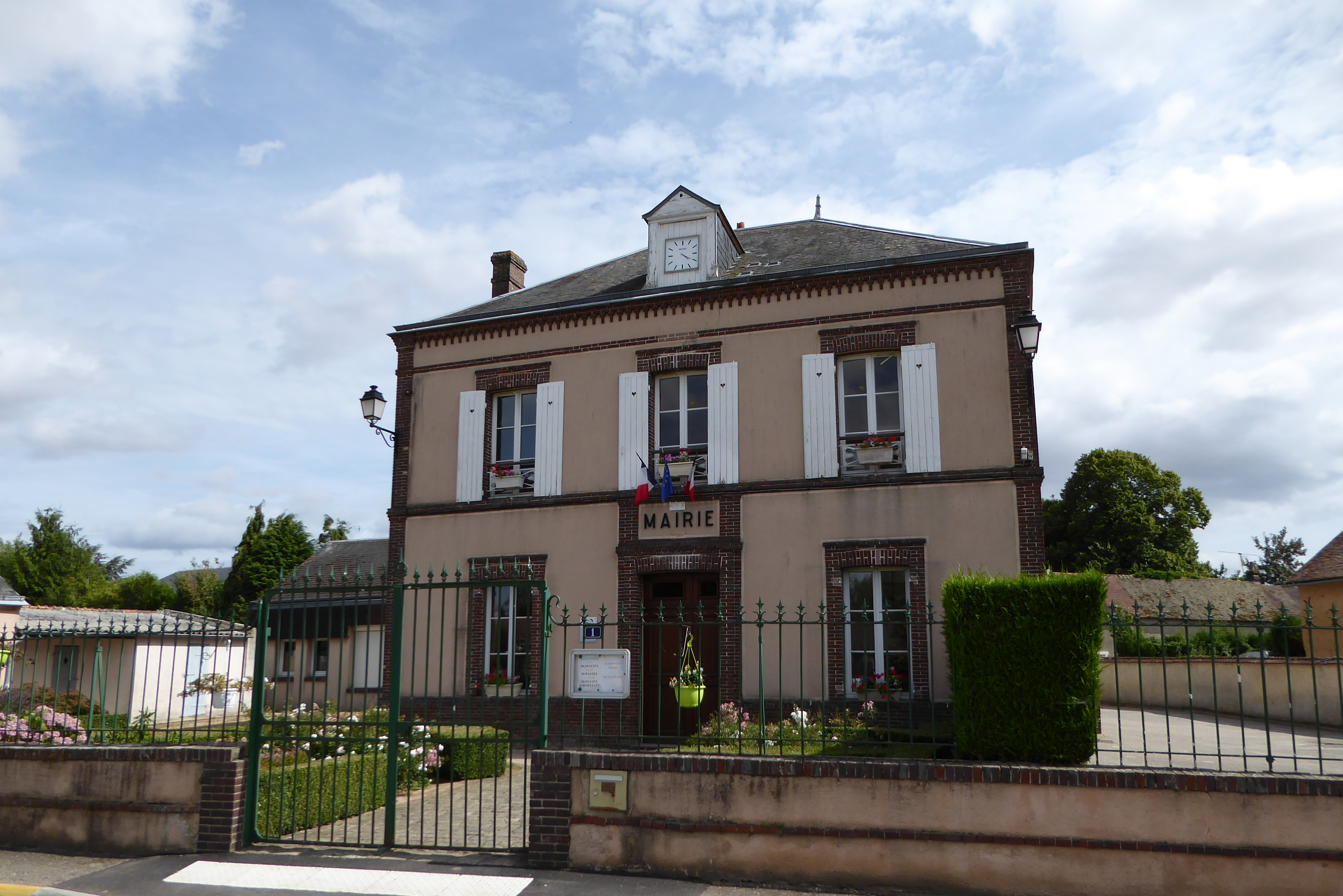
- The town hall in Germainville
- Location of Germainville
- Location within France Location within Centre-Val de Loire
- Coordinates: 48°44′33″N 1°28′58″E
- Country: France
- Region: Centre-Val de Loire
- Department: Eure-et-Loir
- Arrondissement: Dreux
- Canton: Anet
- Intercommunality: CA Pays de Dreux

Government
  - Mayor (2020–2026): Jean-Marc Tardivent
- Area^{1}: 8.67 km^{2} (3.35 sq mi)
- Elevation: 115 m (377 ft)
- Highest elevation: 139 m (456 ft)
- Lowest elevation: 127 m (417 ft)
- Population (2023): 338
  - Density: 39.0/km^{2} (101/sq mi)
- Time zone: UTC+01:00 (CET)
  - Summer (DST): UTC+02:00 (CEST)
- INSEE/Postal code: 28178 /28500
- ^{1} French Land Register data, which excludes lakes, ponds, glaciers > 1 km^{2} (0.386 sq mi or 247 acres) and river estuaries.

Germainville (French pronunciation: [ʒɛʁmɛ̃vil]) is a commune in the Eure-et-Loir department in northern France.

== Population ==
Historical population
Year	Pop.	±% p.a.
1968	162	—
1975	171	+0.78%
1982	235	+4.65%
1990	258	+1.17%
1999	297	+1.58%
2007	298	+0.04%
2012	309	+0.73%
2017	290	−1.26%
2023	338	+2.59%
Source: INSEE

== See also ==
- Communes of the Eure-et-Loir department
