= Serville, Eure-et-Loir =

Serville
- Commune
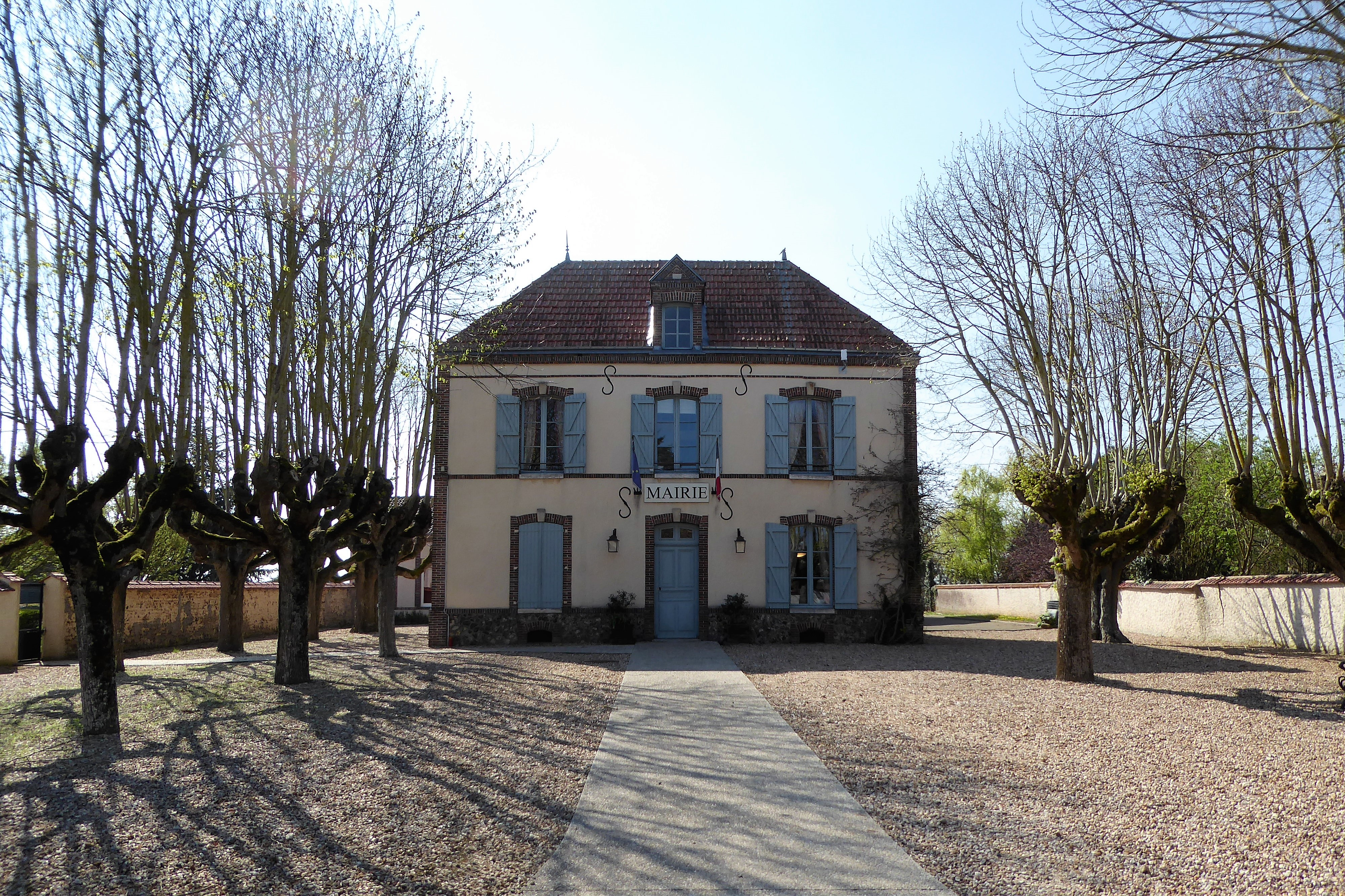
- The town hall in Serville
- Location of Serville
- Location within France Location within Centre-Val de Loire
- Coordinates: 48°46′11″N 1°29′10″E
- Country: France
- Region: Centre-Val de Loire
- Department: Eure-et-Loir
- Arrondissement: Dreux
- Canton: Anet
- Intercommunality: CA Pays de Dreux

Government
  - Mayor (2020–2026): Thomas Baubion
- Area^{1}: 5.62 km^{2} (2.17 sq mi)
- Elevation: 137 m (449 ft)
- Highest elevation: 141 m (463 ft)
- Lowest elevation: 134 m (440 ft)
- Population (2023): 359
  - Density: 63.9/km^{2} (165/sq mi)
- Time zone: UTC+01:00 (CET)
  - Summer (DST): UTC+02:00 (CEST)
- INSEE/Postal code: 28375 /28410
- ^{1} French Land Register data, which excludes lakes, ponds, glaciers > 1 km^{2} (0.386 sq mi or 247 acres) and river estuaries.

Serville (French pronunciation: [sɛʁvil]) is a commune in the Eure-et-Loir department in northern France.

== Population ==
Historical population
Year	Pop.	±% p.a.
1968	267	—
1975	244	−1.28%
1982	204	−2.53%
1990	289	+4.45%
1999	294	+0.19%
2007	358	+2.49%
2012	354	−0.22%
2017	366	+0.67%
2023	359	−0.32%
Source: INSEE

== See also ==
- Communes of the Eure-et-Loir department
