= Boncourt, Eure-et-Loir =

Boncourt
- Commune
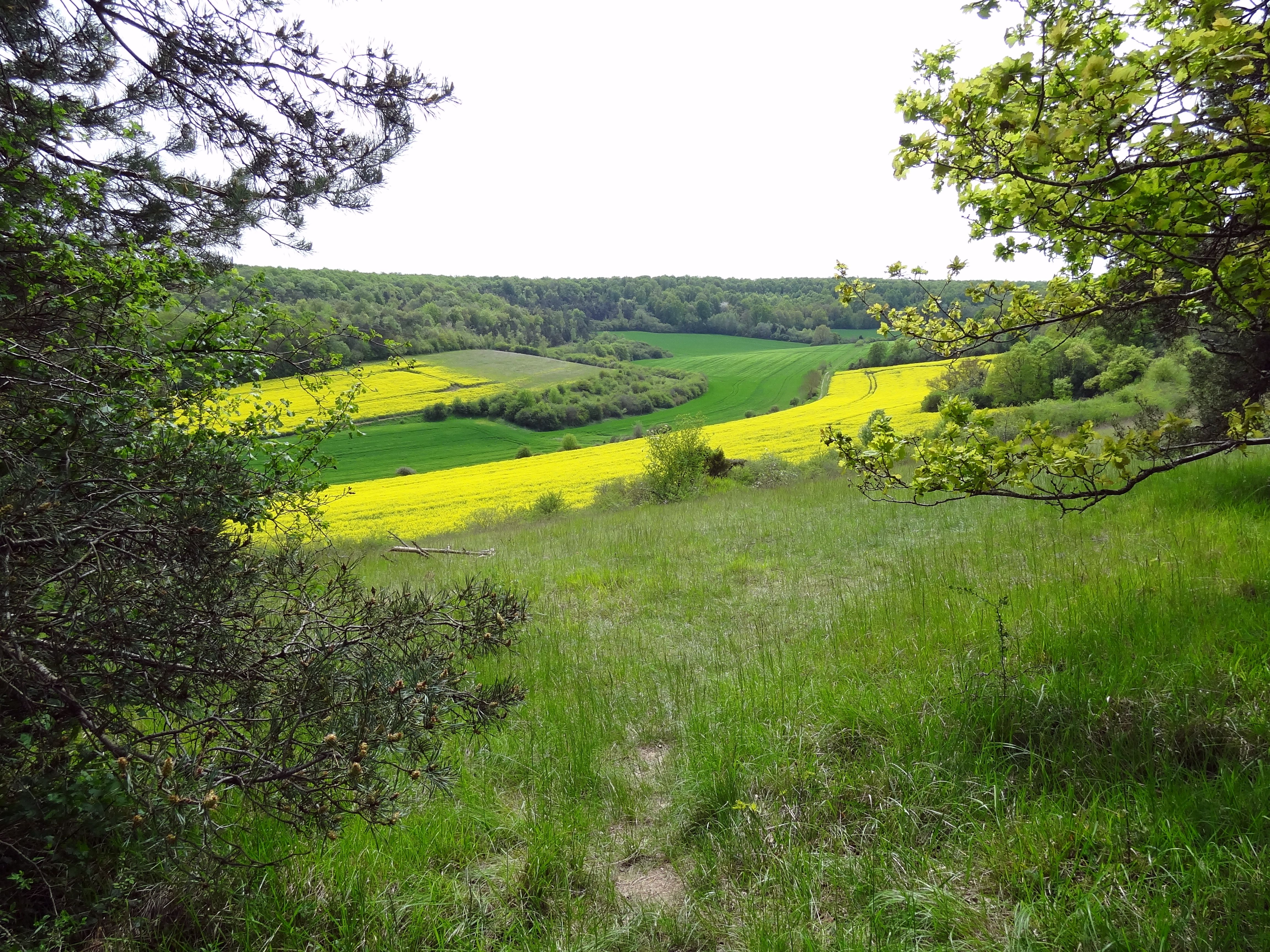
- The regional natural reserve of the Cailles Valley
- Location of Boncourt
- Location within France Location within Centre-Val de Loire
- Coordinates: 48°50′51″N 1°27′43″E
- Country: France
- Region: Centre-Val de Loire
- Department: Eure-et-Loir
- Arrondissement: Dreux
- Canton: Anet
- Intercommunality: CA Pays de Dreux

Government
  - Mayor (2020–2026): Jean-Claude Delanoé
- Area^{1}: 3.71 km^{2} (1.43 sq mi)
- Elevation: 70 m (230 ft)
- Highest elevation: 125 m (410 ft)
- Lowest elevation: 62 m (203 ft)
- Population (2023): 274
  - Density: 73.9/km^{2} (191/sq mi)
- Time zone: UTC+01:00 (CET)
  - Summer (DST): UTC+02:00 (CEST)
- INSEE/Postal code: 28050 /28260
- ^{1} French Land Register data, which excludes lakes, ponds, glaciers > 1 km^{2} (0.386 sq mi or 247 acres) and river estuaries.

Boncourt (French pronunciation: [bɔ̃kuʁ]) is a commune in the Eure-et-Loir department in northern France.

== Population ==
Historical population
Year	Pop.	±% p.a.
1968	132	—
1975	145	+1.35%
1982	124	−2.21%
1990	191	+5.55%
1999	239	+2.52%
2007	269	+1.49%
2012	274	+0.37%
2017	266	−0.59%
2023	274	+0.50%
Source: INSEE

== See also ==
- Communes of the Eure-et-Loir department
