= La Saucelle =

- Commune
- Location of La Saucelle
- Location within France Location within Centre-Val de Loire
- Coordinates: 48°37′52″N 1°01′49″E
- Country: France
- Region: Centre-Val de Loire
- Department: Eure-et-Loir
- Arrondissement: Dreux
- Canton: Saint-Lubin-des-Joncherets
- Intercommunality: Forêts du Perche

Government
  - Mayor (2020–2026): Philippe Penny
- Area^{1}: 14.26 km^{2} (5.51 sq mi)
- Elevation: 225 m (738 ft)
- Highest elevation: 215 m (705 ft)
- Lowest elevation: 175 m (574 ft)
- Population (2023): 198
  - Density: 13.9/km^{2} (36.0/sq mi)
- Time zone: UTC+01:00 (CET)
  - Summer (DST): UTC+02:00 (CEST)
- INSEE/Postal code: 28368 /28250
- ^{1} French Land Register data, which excludes lakes, ponds, glaciers > 1 km^{2} (0.386 sq mi or 247 acres) and river estuaries.

La Saucelle (French pronunciation: [la sosɛl]) is a commune in the Eure-et-Loir département in northern France. Between 1973 and 1987, it was united with La Framboisière in the commune La Framboisière-la-Saucelle.

== Geography ==
The Commune along with another 70 communes shares part of a 47,681 hectare, Natura 2000 conservation area, called the Forêts et étangs du Perche.

== Population ==
Historical population
Year	Pop.	±% p.a.
1968	162	—
1975	142	−1.86%
1982	141	−0.10%
1990	145	+0.35%
1999	164	+1.38%
2007	168	+0.30%
2012	181	+1.50%
2017	194	+1.40%
2023	198	+0.34%
Source: INSEE

== See also ==
- Communes of the Eure-et-Loir department
