= Broué =

- Commune
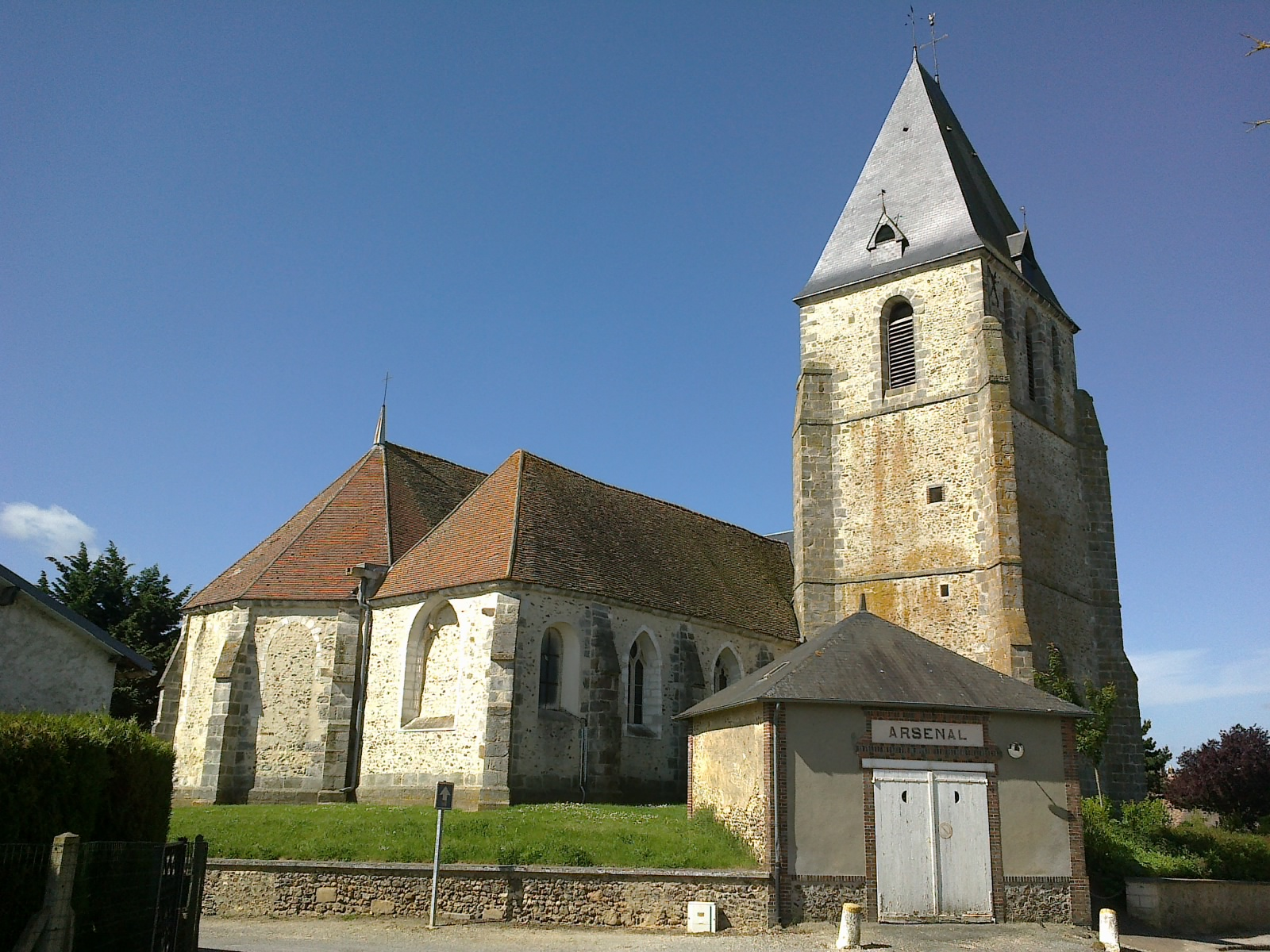
- The church in Broué
- Location of Broué
- Location within France Location within Centre-Val de Loire
- Coordinates: 48°44′56″N 1°31′22″E
- Country: France
- Region: Centre-Val de Loire
- Department: Eure-et-Loir
- Arrondissement: Dreux
- Canton: Anet
- Intercommunality: CA Pays de Dreux

Government
  - Mayor (2020–2026): Patrice Leromain
- Area^{1}: 12.03 km^{2} (4.64 sq mi)
- Elevation: 158 m (518 ft)
- Highest elevation: 152 m (499 ft)
- Lowest elevation: 131 m (430 ft)
- Population (2023): 837
  - Density: 69.6/km^{2} (180/sq mi)
- Time zone: UTC+01:00 (CET)
  - Summer (DST): UTC+02:00 (CEST)
- INSEE/Postal code: 28062 /28410
- ^{1} French Land Register data, which excludes lakes, ponds, glaciers > 1 km^{2} (0.386 sq mi or 247 acres) and river estuaries.

Broué (French pronunciation: [bʁue]) is a commune in the Eure-et-Loir department in northern France.

== Population ==
Historical population
Year	Pop.	±% p.a.
1968	416	—
1975	484	+2.19%
1982	614	+3.46%
1990	675	+1.19%
1999	762	+1.36%
2007	914	+2.30%
2012	903	−0.24%
2017	888	−0.33%
2023	837	−0.98%
Source: INSEE

== See also ==
- Communes of the Eure-et-Loir department
