= Château de Sorel =

Castle in France

Coordinates: 48.831°N 1.364°E

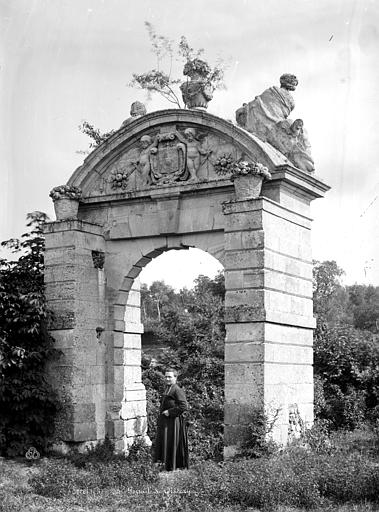
Portal of Sorel castle

Château de Sorel was a castle in Sorel-Moussel, Eure-et-Loir, France.

== History ==
A motte-and-bailey castle was built in the 10th century to protect against Viking raids. The castle was located on a promontory overlooking the Eure River.

The castle was fortified with a stone keep and ramparts. Philippe de Dreux, bishop-count of Beauvais, destroyed the castle in the 12th century. It was later rebuilt and strengthened. The Catholic League destroyed the castle in the 16th century, later being rebuilt in the 17th century.

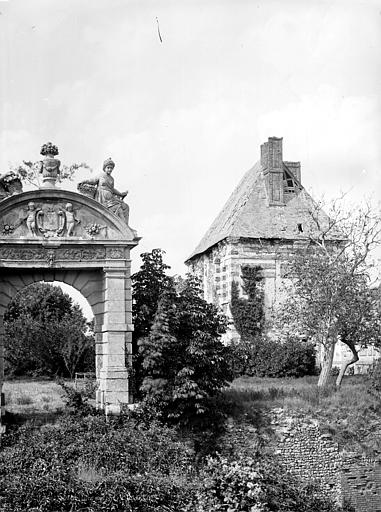

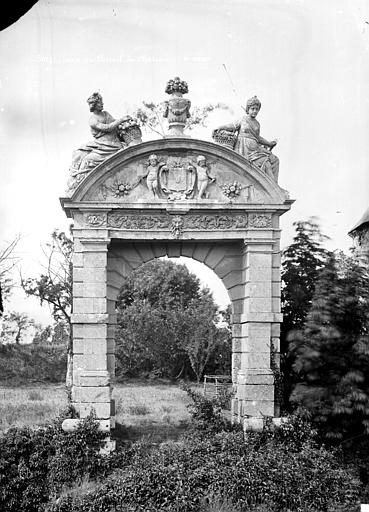

== See also ==
- List of châteaux in Eure-et-Loir

== Sources ==
- The World of the French Chateau - Château de Sorel
