= Havelu =

- Commune
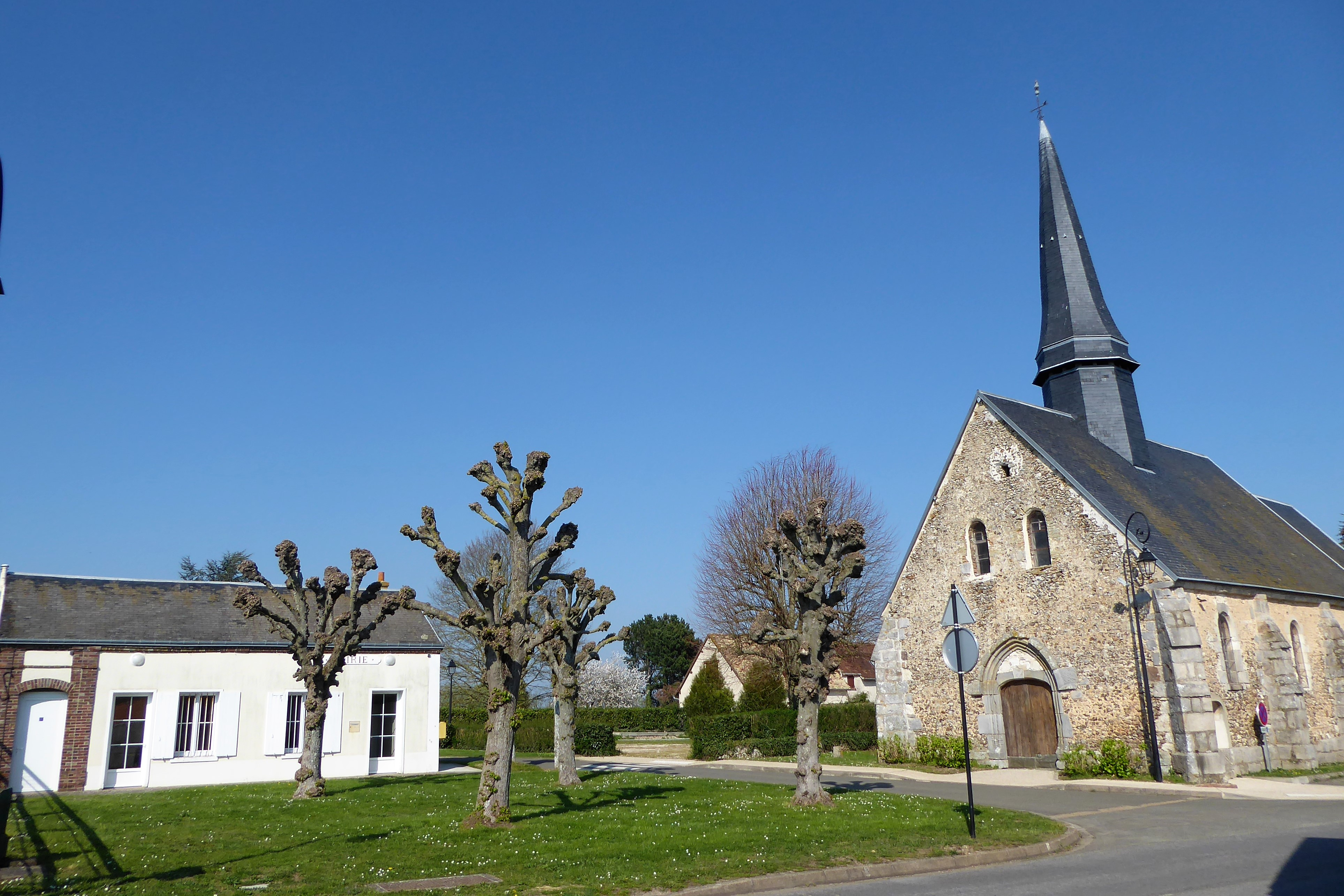
- The town hall and church in Havelu
- Location of Havelu
- Location within France Location within Centre-Val de Loire
- Coordinates: 48°47′18″N 1°32′05″E
- Country: France
- Region: Centre-Val de Loire
- Department: Eure-et-Loir
- Arrondissement: Dreux
- Canton: Anet
- Intercommunality: Pays houdanais

Government
  - Mayor (2020–2026): Guy Duval
- Area^{1}: 3.7 km^{2} (1.4 sq mi)
- Elevation: 136 m (446 ft)
- Highest elevation: 137 m (449 ft)
- Lowest elevation: 124 m (407 ft)
- Population (2023): 127
  - Density: 34/km^{2} (89/sq mi)
- Time zone: UTC+01:00 (CET)
  - Summer (DST): UTC+02:00 (CEST)
- INSEE/Postal code: 28193 /28410
- ^{1} French Land Register data, which excludes lakes, ponds, glaciers > 1 km^{2} (0.386 sq mi or 247 acres) and river estuaries.

Havelu (French pronunciation: [avly]) is a commune in the Eure-et-Loir department in northern France.

== Population ==
Historical population
Year	Pop.	±% p.a.
1968	109	—
1975	109	+0.00%
1982	85	−3.49%
1990	94	+1.27%
1999	102	+0.91%
2007	113	+1.29%
2012	121	+1.38%
2017	142	+3.25%
2023	127	−1.84%
Source: INSEE

== See also ==
- Communes of the Eure-et-Loir department
