= Gilles, Eure-et-Loir =

Gilles
- Commune
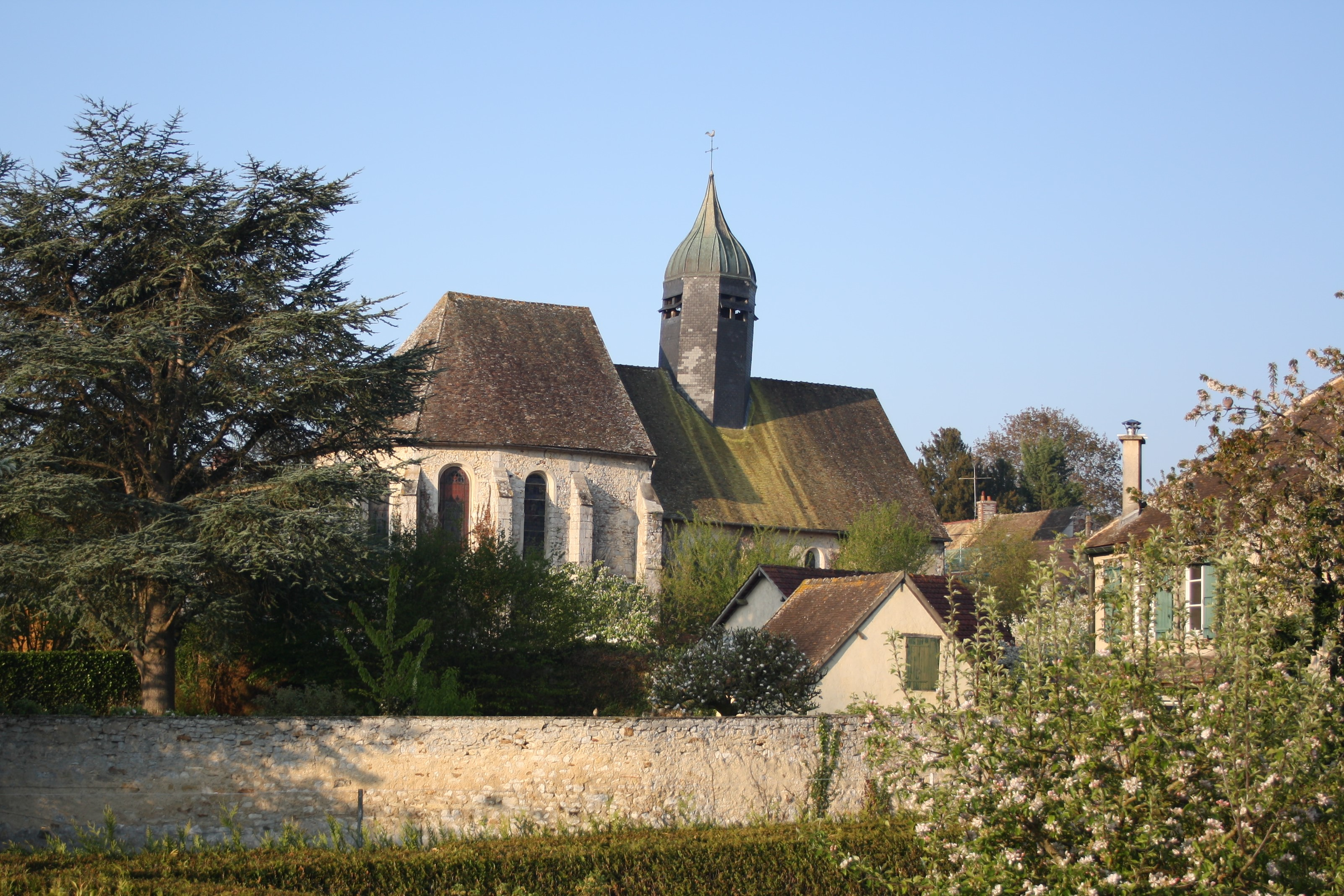
- The church Saint-Aignan in Gilles

- Coat of arms
- Location of Gilles
- Location within France Location within Centre-Val de Loire
- Coordinates: 48°54′52″N 1°30′55″E
- Country: France
- Region: Centre-Val de Loire
- Department: Eure-et-Loir
- Arrondissement: Dreux
- Canton: Anet
- Intercommunality: CA Pays de Dreux

Government
  - Mayor (2020–2026): Michel Malhappe
- Area^{1}: 7.26 km^{2} (2.80 sq mi)
- Elevation: 98 m (322 ft)
- Highest elevation: 166 m (545 ft)
- Lowest elevation: 82 m (269 ft)
- Population (2023): 498
  - Density: 68.6/km^{2} (178/sq mi)
- Time zone: UTC+01:00 (CET)
  - Summer (DST): UTC+02:00 (CEST)
- INSEE/Postal code: 28180 /28260
- ^{1} French Land Register data, which excludes lakes, ponds, glaciers > 1 km^{2} (0.386 sq mi or 247 acres) and river estuaries.

Gilles (French pronunciation: [ʒil]) is a commune in the Eure-et-Loir department in northern France.

== Population ==
Historical population
Year	Pop.	±% p.a.
1968	256	—
1975	307	+2.63%
1982	319	+0.55%
1990	445	+4.25%
1999	540	+2.17%
2007	575	+0.79%
2012	551	−0.85%
2017	522	−1.08%
2023	498	−0.78%
Source: INSEE

== See also ==
- Communes of the Eure-et-Loir department
