= Le Mesnil-Simon, Eure-et-Loir =

Le Mesnil-Simon
- Commune
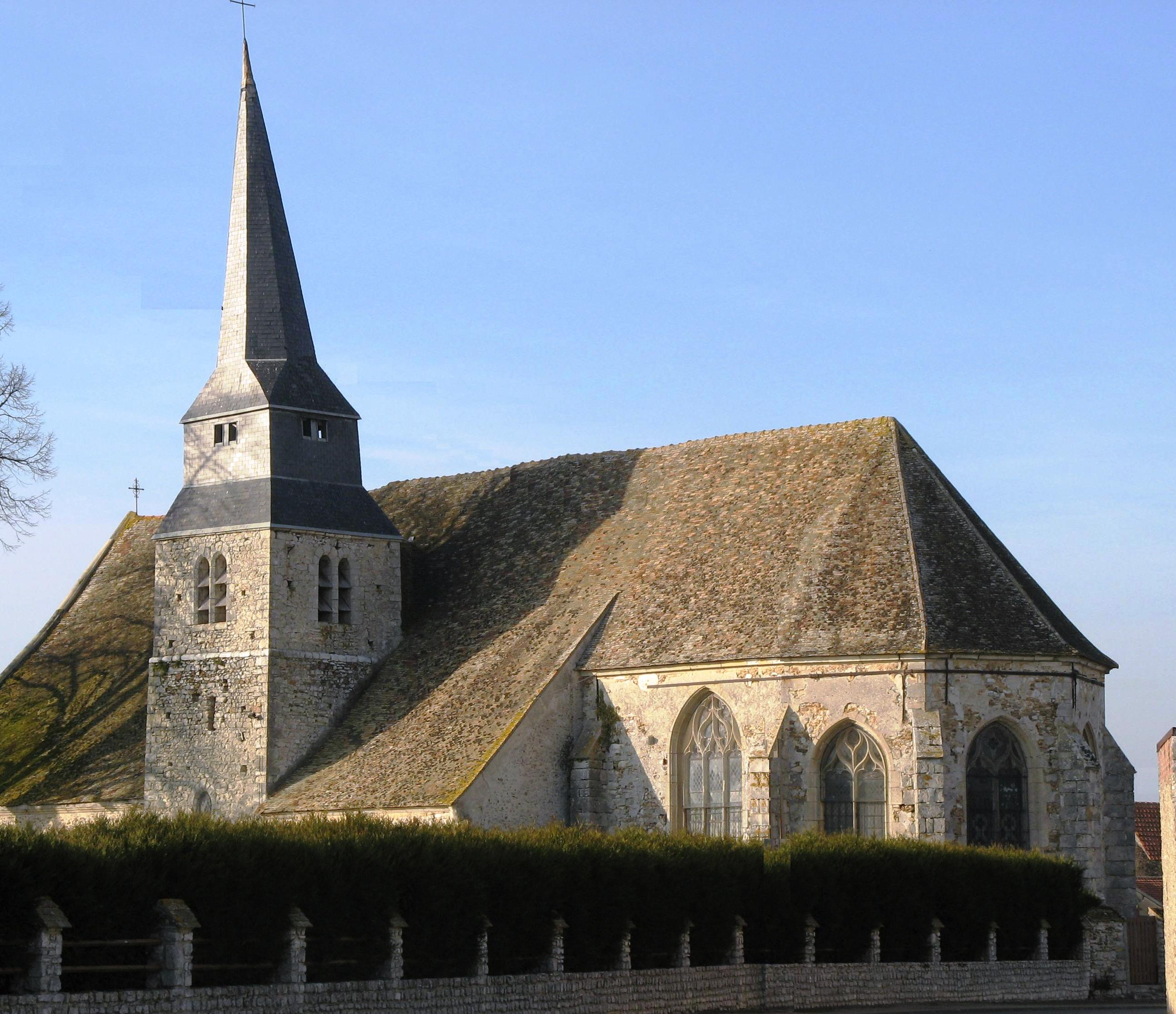
- The church in Le Mesnil-Simon

- Coat of arms
- Location of Le Mesnil-Simon
- Location within France Location within Centre-Val de Loire
- Coordinates: 48°53′47″N 1°32′16″E
- Country: France
- Region: Centre-Val de Loire
- Department: Eure-et-Loir
- Arrondissement: Dreux
- Canton: Anet
- Intercommunality: CA Pays de Dreux

Government
  - Mayor (2020–2026): Didier Simo
- Area^{1}: 9.17 km^{2} (3.54 sq mi)
- Elevation: 130 m (430 ft)
- Highest elevation: 167 m (548 ft)
- Lowest elevation: 108 m (354 ft)
- Population (2023): 565
  - Density: 61.6/km^{2} (160/sq mi)
- Time zone: UTC+01:00 (CET)
  - Summer (DST): UTC+02:00 (CEST)
- INSEE/Postal code: 28247 /28260
- ^{1} French Land Register data, which excludes lakes, ponds, glaciers > 1 km^{2} (0.386 sq mi or 247 acres) and river estuaries.

Le Mesnil-Simon (French pronunciation: [lə mɛnil simɔ̃]) is a commune in the Eure-et-Loir department in northern France.

== Population ==
Historical population
Year	Pop.	±% p.a.
1968	185	—
1975	239	+3.73%
1982	251	+0.70%
1990	337	+3.75%
1999	414	+2.31%
2007	492	+2.18%
2012	566	+2.84%
2017	580	+0.49%
2023	565	−0.44%
Source: INSEE

== See also ==
- Communes of the Eure-et-Loir department
