= Oulins =

- Commune
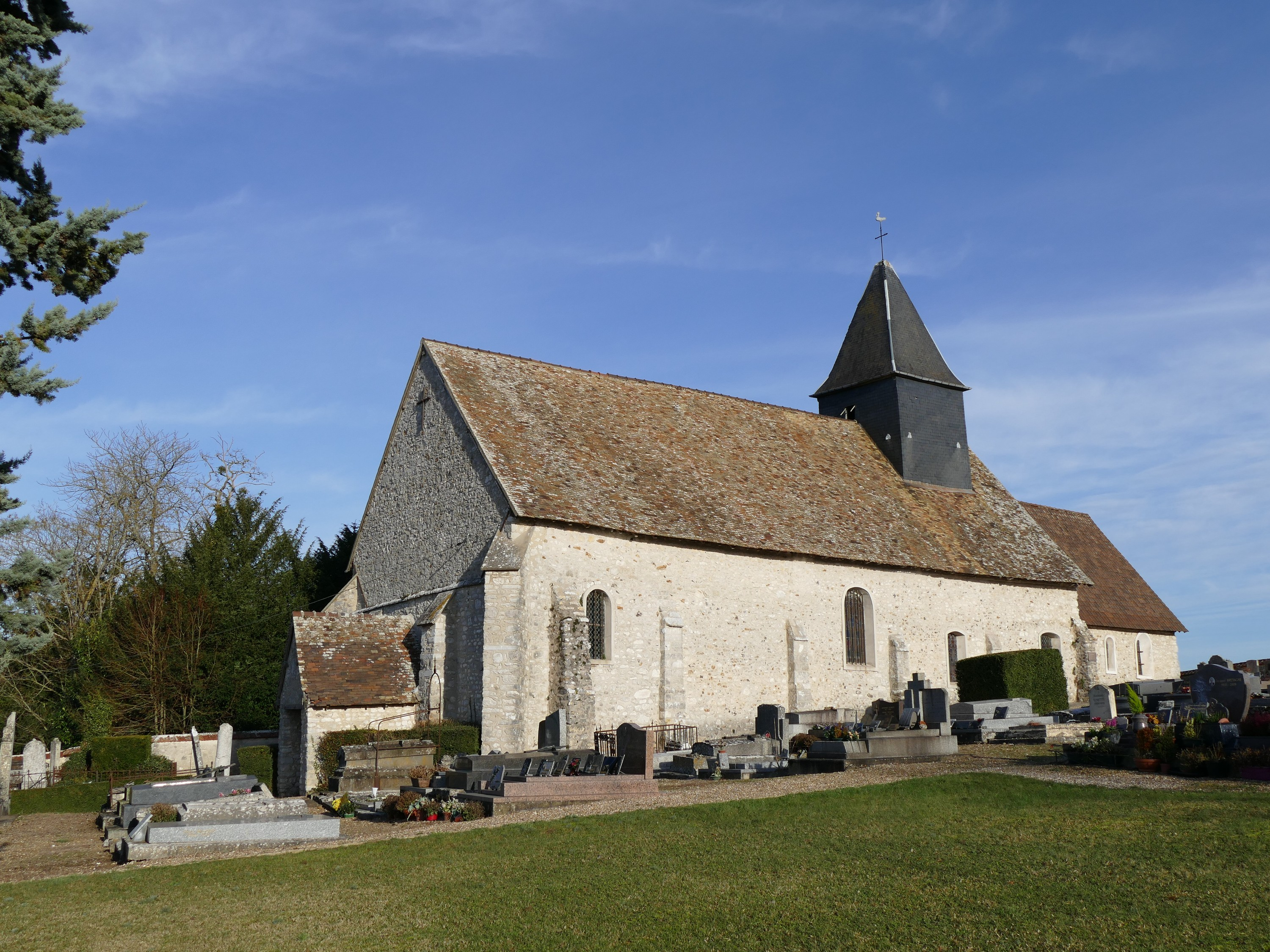
- The church in Oulins

- Coat of arms
- Location of Oulins
- Location within France Location within Centre-Val de Loire
- Coordinates: 48°51′57″N 1°28′18″E
- Country: France
- Region: Centre-Val de Loire
- Department: Eure-et-Loir
- Arrondissement: Dreux
- Canton: Anet
- Intercommunality: CA Pays de Dreux

Government
  - Mayor (2020–2026): Pascal Lepetit
- Area^{1}: 10.08 km^{2} (3.89 sq mi)
- Elevation: 75 m (246 ft)
- Highest elevation: 160 m (520 ft)
- Lowest elevation: 58 m (190 ft)
- Population (2023): 1,171
  - Density: 116.2/km^{2} (300.9/sq mi)
- Time zone: UTC+01:00 (CET)
  - Summer (DST): UTC+02:00 (CEST)
- INSEE/Postal code: 28293 /28260
- ^{1} French Land Register data, which excludes lakes, ponds, glaciers > 1 km^{2} (0.386 sq mi or 247 acres) and river estuaries.

Oulins (French pronunciation: [ulɛ̃]) is a commune in the Eure-et-Loir department in northern France.

== Population ==
Historical population
Year	Pop.	±% p.a.
1968	236	—
1975	290	+2.99%
1982	350	+2.72%
1990	722	+9.47%
1999	798	+1.12%
2007	1,078	+3.83%
2012	1,186	+1.93%
2017	1,205	+0.32%
2023	1,171	−0.48%
Source: INSEE

Oulins, France is home to scale model manufacturer Solido.

== See also ==
- Communes of the Eure-et-Loir department

== External Sources ==
- World War I Belgian Refugees: Comite Franco-American pour la Protection des Enfants de la Frontiere -- Oulins
