= La Chaussée-d'Ivry =

- Commune
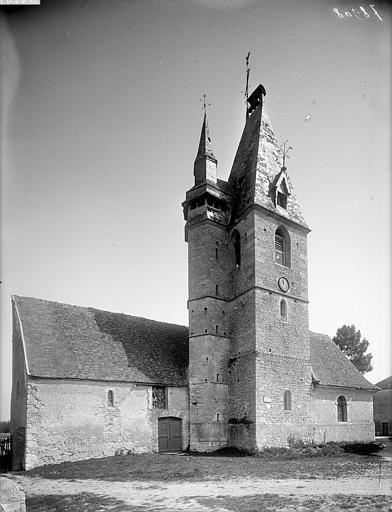
- The church in La Chaussée-d'Ivry

- Coat of arms
- Location of La Chaussée-d'Ivry
- Location within France Location within Centre-Val de Loire
- Coordinates: 48°52′59″N 1°28′48″E
- Country: France
- Region: Centre-Val de Loire
- Department: Eure-et-Loir
- Arrondissement: Dreux
- Canton: Anet
- Intercommunality: CA Pays de Dreux

Government
  - Mayor (2020–2026): Francis Pecquenard
- Area^{1}: 8.39 km^{2} (3.24 sq mi)
- Highest elevation: 168 m (551 ft)
- Lowest elevation: 52 m (171 ft)
- Population (2023): 1,321
  - Density: 157/km^{2} (408/sq mi)
- Time zone: UTC+01:00 (CET)
  - Summer (DST): UTC+02:00 (CEST)
- INSEE/Postal code: 28096 /28260
- ^{1} French Land Register data, which excludes lakes, ponds, glaciers > 1 km^{2} (0.386 sq mi or 247 acres) and river estuaries.

La Chaussée-d'Ivry (French pronunciation: [la ʃose divʁi], literally The Causeway of Ivry) is a commune in the Eure-et-Loir department in northern France.

== Population ==
Historical population
Year	Pop.	±% p.a.
1968	541	—
1975	649	+2.63%
1982	879	+4.43%
1990	965	+1.17%
1999	924	−0.48%
2007	1,002	+1.02%
2012	1,041	+0.77%
2017	1,156	+2.12%
2023	1,321	+2.25%
Source: INSEE

== See also ==
- Communes of the Eure-et-Loir department
