= La Chapelle-Forainvilliers =

- Commune
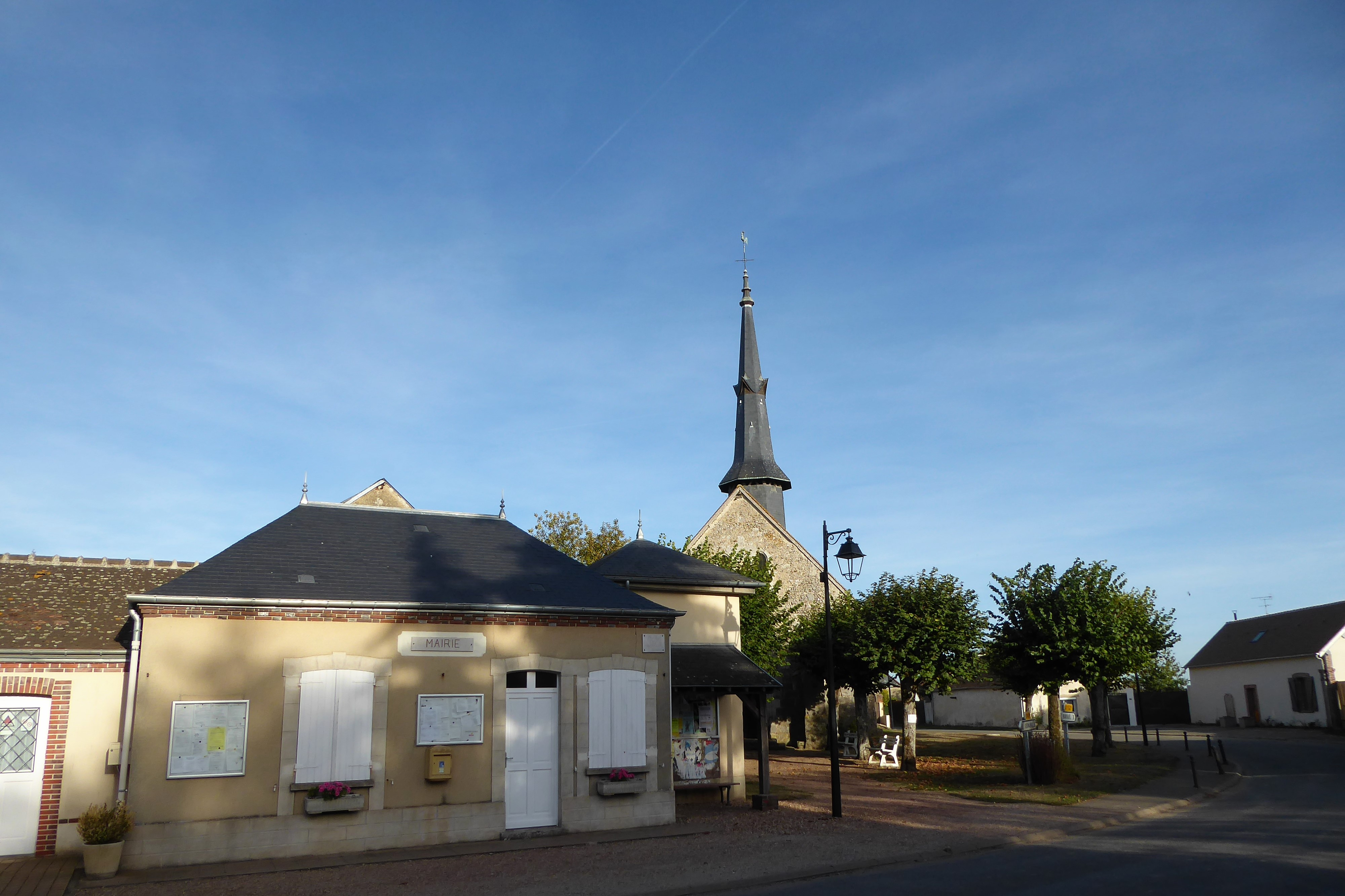
- The town hall and church in La Chapelle-Forainvilliers
- Location of La Chapelle-Forainvilliers
- Location within France Location within Centre-Val de Loire
- Coordinates: 48°43′46″N 1°30′09″E
- Country: France
- Region: Centre-Val de Loire
- Department: Eure-et-Loir
- Arrondissement: Dreux
- Canton: Anet
- Intercommunality: CA Pays de Dreux

Government
  - Mayor (2020–2026): Samuel Bove
- Area^{1}: 5.38 km^{2} (2.08 sq mi)
- Elevation: 220 m (720 ft)
- Highest elevation: 136 m (446 ft)
- Lowest elevation: 118 m (387 ft)
- Population (2023): 211
  - Density: 39.2/km^{2} (102/sq mi)
- Time zone: UTC+01:00 (CET)
  - Summer (DST): UTC+02:00 (CEST)
- INSEE/Postal code: 28076 /28500
- ^{1} French Land Register data, which excludes lakes, ponds, glaciers > 1 km^{2} (0.386 sq mi or 247 acres) and river estuaries.

La Chapelle-Forainvilliers (French pronunciation: [la ʃapɛl fɔʁɛ̃vilje]) is a commune in the Eure-et-Loir department in northern France.

== Population ==
Historical population
Year	Pop.	±% p.a.
1968	70	—
1975	95	+4.46%
1982	77	−2.96%
1990	120	+5.70%
1999	169	+3.88%
2007	172	+0.22%
2012	180	+0.91%
2017	201	+2.23%
2023	211	+0.81%
Source: INSEE

== See also ==
- Communes of the Eure-et-Loir department
