= Cherisy =

- Commune
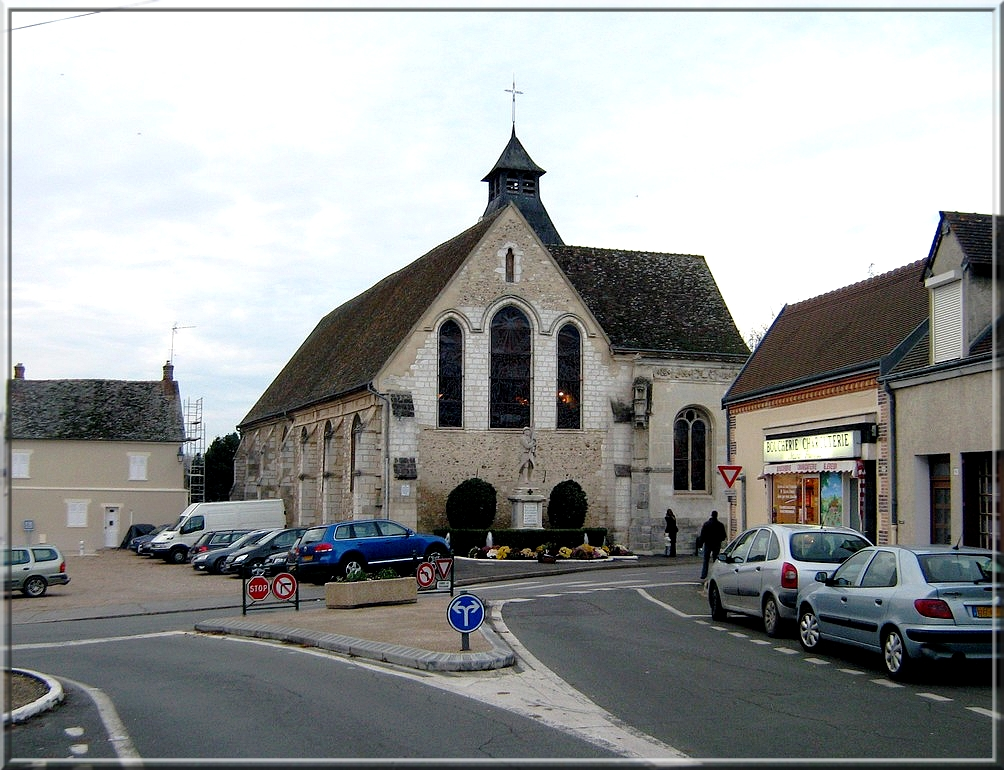
- The church in Cherisy

- Coat of arms
- Location of Cherisy
- Location within France Location within Centre-Val de Loire
- Coordinates: 48°44′50″N 1°25′22″E
- Country: France
- Region: Centre-Val de Loire
- Department: Eure-et-Loir
- Arrondissement: Dreux
- Canton: Anet
- Intercommunality: CA Pays de Dreux

Government
  - Mayor (2020–2026): Michel Lethuillier
- Area^{1}: 12.38 km^{2} (4.78 sq mi)
- Elevation: 133 m (436 ft)
- Highest elevation: 139 m (456 ft)
- Lowest elevation: 74 m (243 ft)
- Population (2023): 1,842
  - Density: 148.8/km^{2} (385.4/sq mi)
- Time zone: UTC+01:00 (CET)
  - Summer (DST): UTC+02:00 (CEST)
- INSEE/Postal code: 28098 /28500
- ^{1} French Land Register data, which excludes lakes, ponds, glaciers > 1 km^{2} (0.386 sq mi or 247 acres) and river estuaries.

Cherisy (French pronunciation: [ʃeʁizi]) is a commune in the Eure-et-Loir department in northern France.

== Population ==
Historical population
Year	Pop.	±% p.a.
1968	852	—
1975	1,103	+3.76%
1982	1,121	+0.23%
1990	1,741	+5.66%
1999	1,768	+0.17%
2007	1,797	+0.20%
2012	1,839	+0.46%
2017	1,866	+0.29%
2023	1,842	−0.22%
Source: INSEE

== See also ==
- Communes of the Eure-et-Loir department
