= Guainville =

- Commune
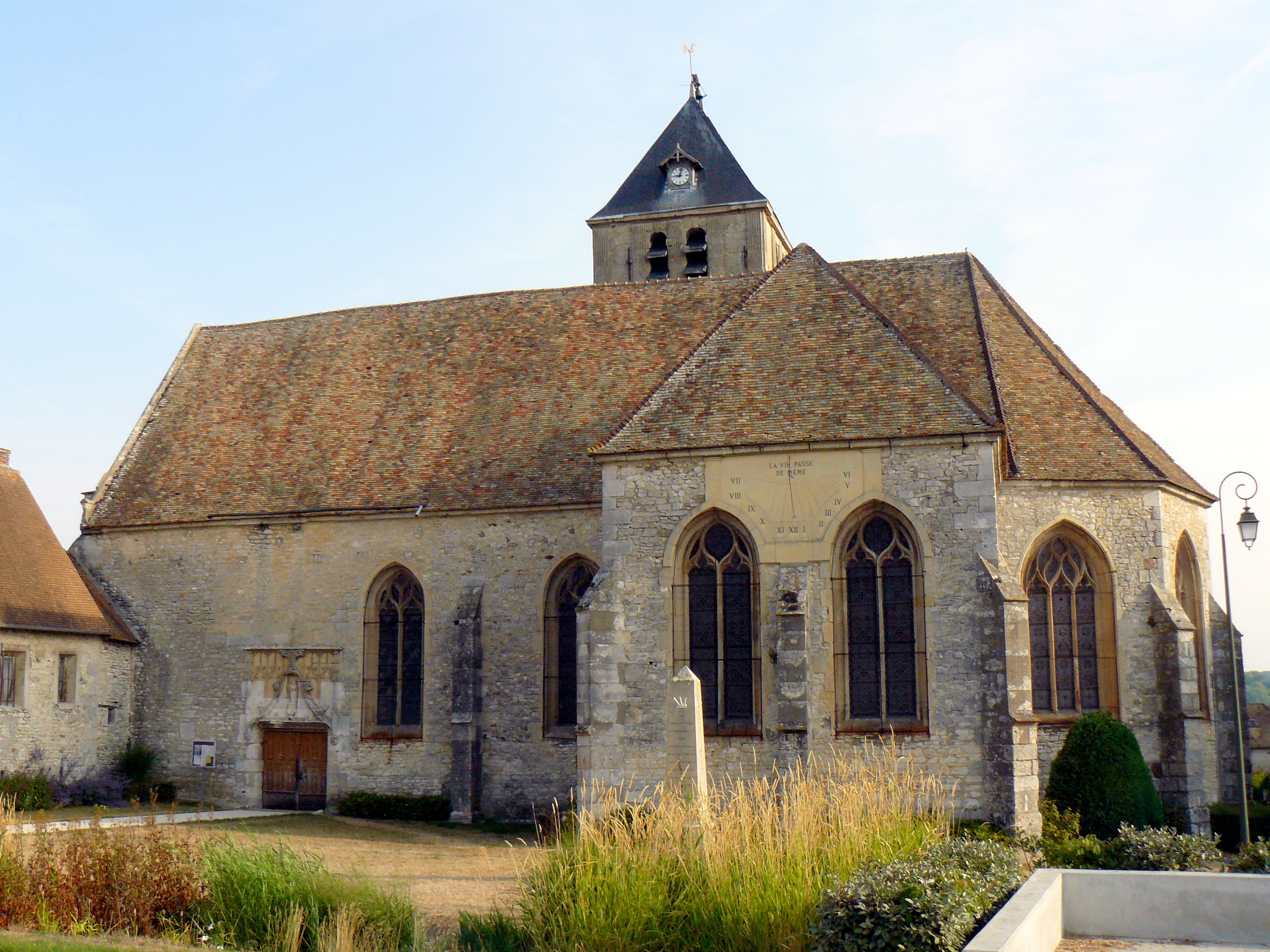
- The church in Guainville

- Coat of arms
- Location of Guainville
- Location within France Location within Centre-Val de Loire
- Coordinates: 48°54′56″N 1°29′34″E
- Country: France
- Region: Centre-Val de Loire
- Department: Eure-et-Loir
- Arrondissement: Dreux
- Canton: Anet
- Intercommunality: CA Pays de Dreux

Government
  - Mayor (2020–2026): Nathalie Velin
- Area^{1}: 14.12 km^{2} (5.45 sq mi)
- Elevation: 146 m (479 ft)
- Highest elevation: 145 m (476 ft)
- Lowest elevation: 52 m (171 ft)
- Population (2023): 696
  - Density: 49.3/km^{2} (128/sq mi)
- Time zone: UTC+01:00 (CET)
  - Summer (DST): UTC+02:00 (CEST)
- INSEE/Postal code: 28187 /28260
- ^{1} French Land Register data, which excludes lakes, ponds, glaciers > 1 km^{2} (0.386 sq mi or 247 acres) and river estuaries.

Guainville is a commune in the Eure-et-Loir department in northern France.

== Population ==
Historical population
Year	Pop.	±% p.a.
1968	256	—
1975	321	+3.29%
1982	412	+3.63%
1990	555	+3.79%
1999	614	+1.13%
2007	659	+0.89%
2012	694	+1.04%
2017	655	−1.15%
2023	696	+1.02%
Source: INSEE

== See also ==
- Communes of the Eure-et-Loir department
