= La Framboisière =

- Commune
- Location of La Framboisière
- Location within France Location within Centre-Val de Loire
- Coordinates: 48°35′41″N 1°00′51″E
- Country: France
- Region: Centre-Val de Loire
- Department: Eure-et-Loir
- Arrondissement: Dreux
- Canton: Saint-Lubin-des-Joncherets

Government
  - Mayor (2020–2026): Patrick Lafave
- Area^{1}: 5.23 km^{2} (2.02 sq mi)
- Elevation: 225 m (738 ft)
- Highest elevation: 228 m (748 ft)
- Lowest elevation: 194 m (636 ft)
- Population (2023): 333
  - Density: 63.7/km^{2} (165/sq mi)
- Time zone: UTC+01:00 (CET)
  - Summer (DST): UTC+02:00 (CEST)
- INSEE/Postal code: 28159 /28250
- ^{1} French Land Register data, which excludes lakes, ponds, glaciers > 1 km^{2} (0.386 sq mi or 247 acres) and river estuaries.

La Framboisière (French pronunciation: [la fʁɑ̃bwazjɛʁ]) is a commune in the Eure-et-Loir department in northern France. Between 1973 and 1987, it was united with La Saucelle in the commune La Framboisière-la-Saucelle.

== Geography ==
The Commune along with another 70 communes shares part of a 47,681 hectare, Natura 2000 conservation area, called the Forêts et étangs du Perche.

== Population ==
Historical population
Year	Pop.	±% p.a.
1968	192	—
1975	174	−1.40%
1982	212	+2.86%
1990	289	+3.95%
1999	297	+0.30%
2007	301	+0.17%
2012	346	+2.83%
2017	340	−0.35%
2023	333	−0.35%
Source: INSEE

== See also ==
- Communes of the Eure-et-Loir department
