= Berchères-sur-Vesgre =

- Commune
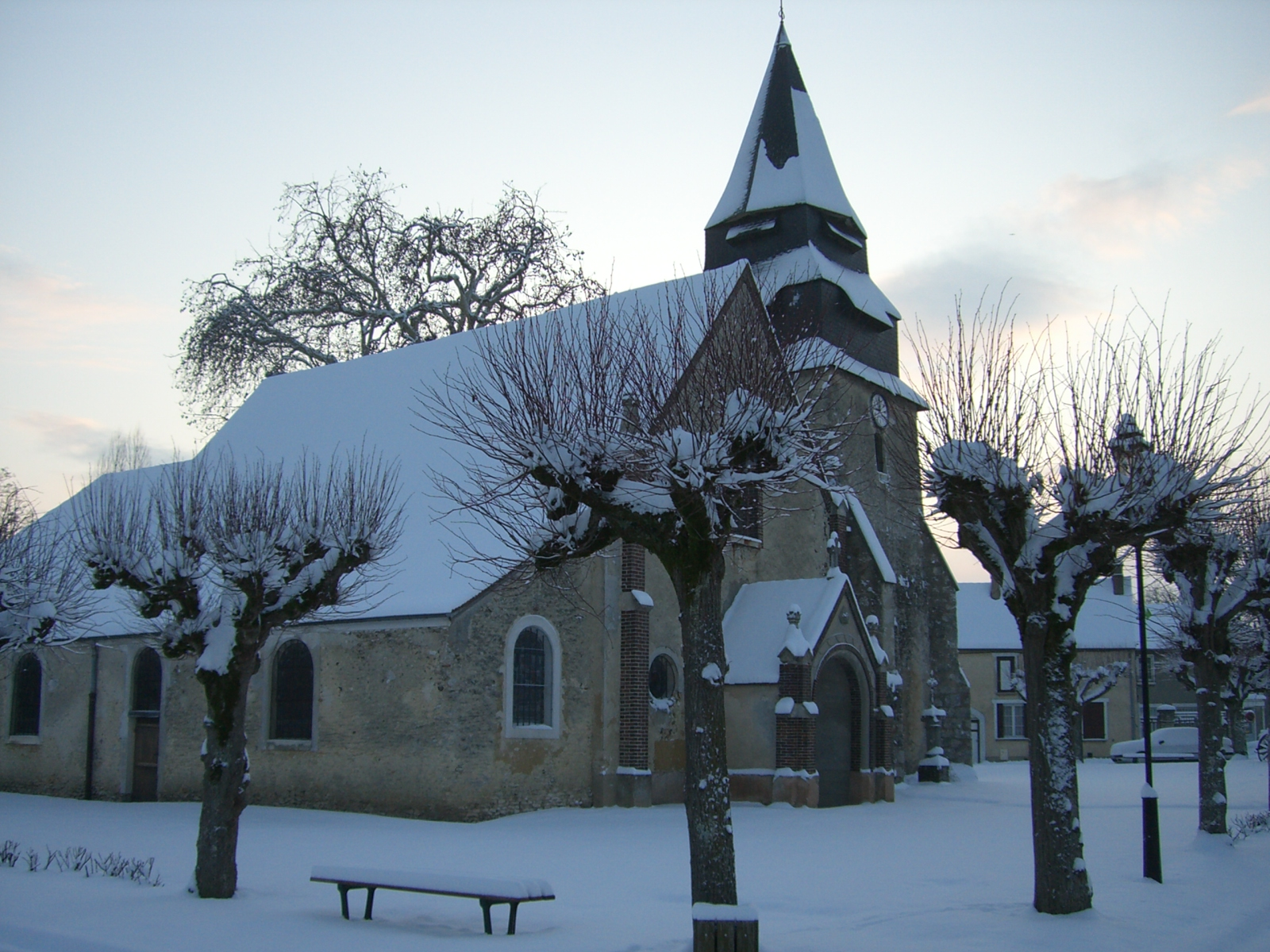
- The church in Berchères-sur-Vesgre

- Coat of arms
- Location of Berchères-sur-Vesgre
- Location within France Location within Centre-Val de Loire
- Coordinates: 48°50′31″N 1°32′29″E
- Country: France
- Region: Centre-Val de Loire
- Department: Eure-et-Loir
- Arrondissement: Dreux
- Canton: Anet
- Intercommunality: CA Pays de Dreux

Government
  - Mayor (2020–2026): Pascal Philippot
- Area^{1}: 11.99 km^{2} (4.63 sq mi)
- Elevation: 167 m (548 ft)
- Highest elevation: 167 m (548 ft)
- Lowest elevation: 77 m (253 ft)
- Population (2023): 862
  - Density: 71.9/km^{2} (186/sq mi)
- Time zone: UTC+01:00 (CET)
  - Summer (DST): UTC+02:00 (CEST)
- INSEE/Postal code: 28036 /28260
- ^{1} French Land Register data, which excludes lakes, ponds, glaciers > 1 km^{2} (0.386 sq mi or 247 acres) and river estuaries.

Berchères-sur-Vesgre (French pronunciation: [bɛʁʃɛʁ syʁ vɛɡʁ]) is a commune in the Eure-et-Loir department in northern France.

== Population ==
Historical population
Year	Pop.	±% p.a.
1968	428	—
1975	485	+1.80%
1982	648	+4.23%
1990	684	+0.68%
1999	712	+0.45%
2007	828	+1.90%
2012	812	−0.39%
2017	849	+0.90%
2023	862	+0.25%
Source: INSEE

== See also ==
- Communes of the Eure-et-Loir department
