= Sorel-Moussel =

- Commune
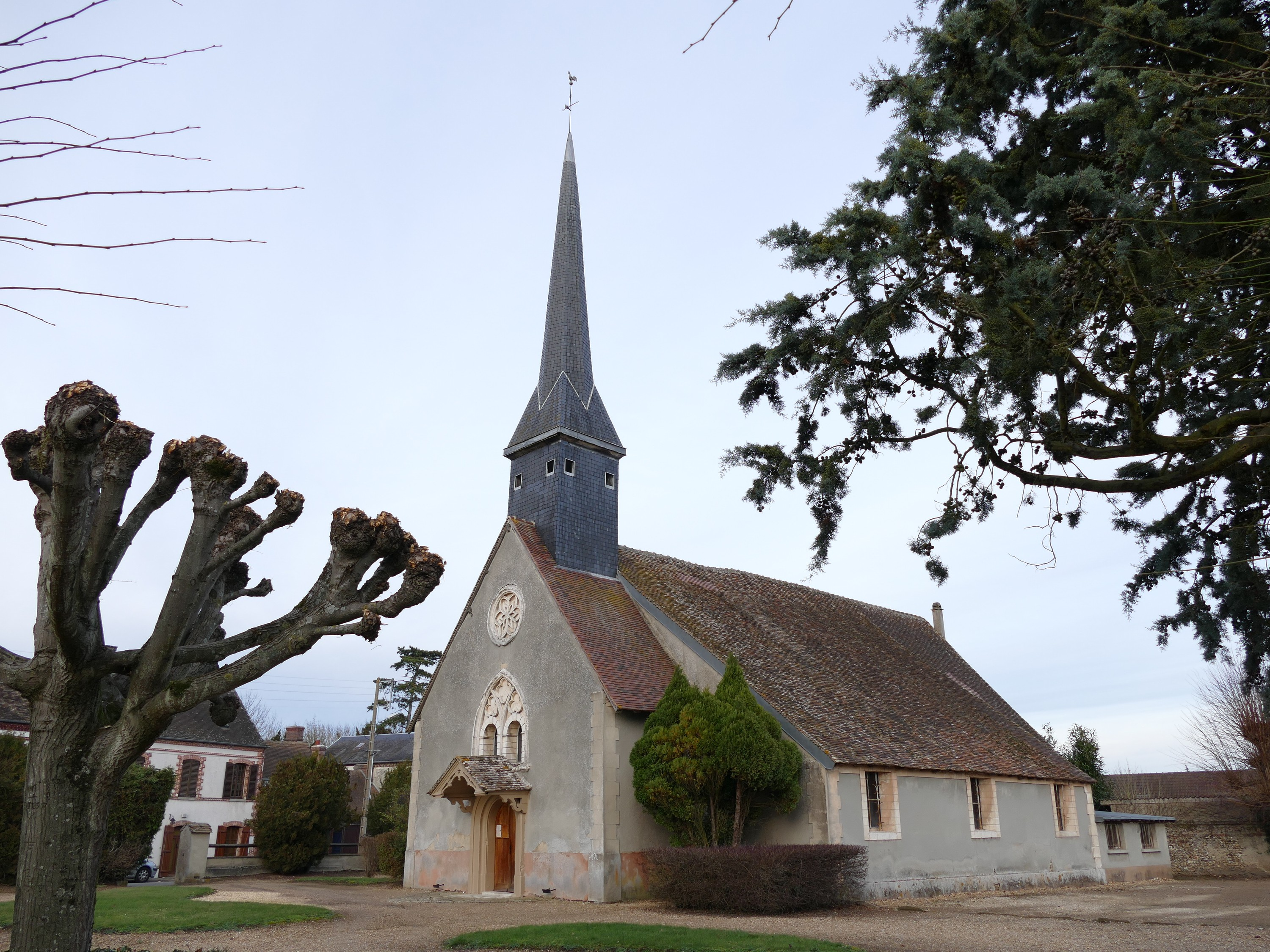
- Saint-Roch church in Sorrel-Moussel
- Location of Sorel-Moussel
- Location within France Location within Centre-Val de Loire
- Coordinates: 48°50′31″N 1°22′59″E
- Country: France
- Region: Centre-Val de Loire
- Department: Eure-et-Loir
- Arrondissement: Dreux
- Canton: Anet
- Intercommunality: CA Pays de Dreux

Government
  - Mayor (2020–2026): Gilbert Galland
- Area^{1}: 12.8 km^{2} (4.9 sq mi)
- Elevation: 90 m (300 ft)
- Highest elevation: 137 m (449 ft)
- Lowest elevation: 64 m (210 ft)
- Population (2023): 1,758
  - Density: 137/km^{2} (356/sq mi)
- Time zone: UTC+01:00 (CET)
  - Summer (DST): UTC+02:00 (CEST)
- INSEE/Postal code: 28377 /28260
- ^{1} French Land Register data, which excludes lakes, ponds, glaciers > 1 km^{2} (0.386 sq mi or 247 acres) and river estuaries.

Sorel-Moussel (French pronunciation: [sɔʁɛl musɛl]) is a commune in the Eure-et-Loir department in northern France.

It holds an important archaeological site known as Fort-Harrouard _{(fr)}, a Neolithic village first studied at the turn of the 20th century by abbé Philippe.

The medieval remains of Château de Sorel, are located nearby.

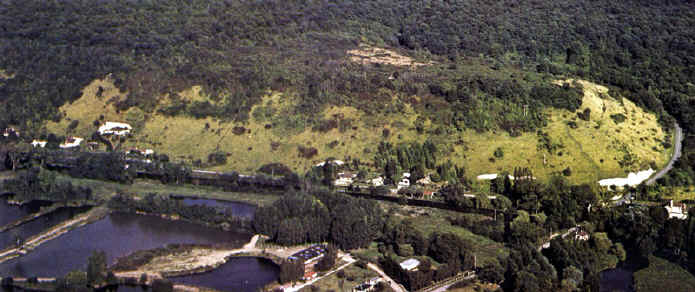
Fort Harrouard _{(fr)}

== Population ==
Historical population
| Year | Pop. | ±% p.a. |
|---|---|---|
| 1968 | 822 | — |
| 1975 | 894 | +1.21% |
| 1982 | 1,011 | +1.77% |
| 1990 | 1,317 | +3.36% |
| 1999 | 1,479 | +1.30% |
| 2007 | 1,819 | +2.62% |
| 2012 | 1,748 | −0.79% |
| 2017 | 1,804 | +0.63% |
| 2023 | 1,758 | −0.43% |
Source: INSEE

== See also ==
- Communes of the Eure-et-Loir department
