= Rouvres, Eure-et-Loir =

Rouvres
- Commune
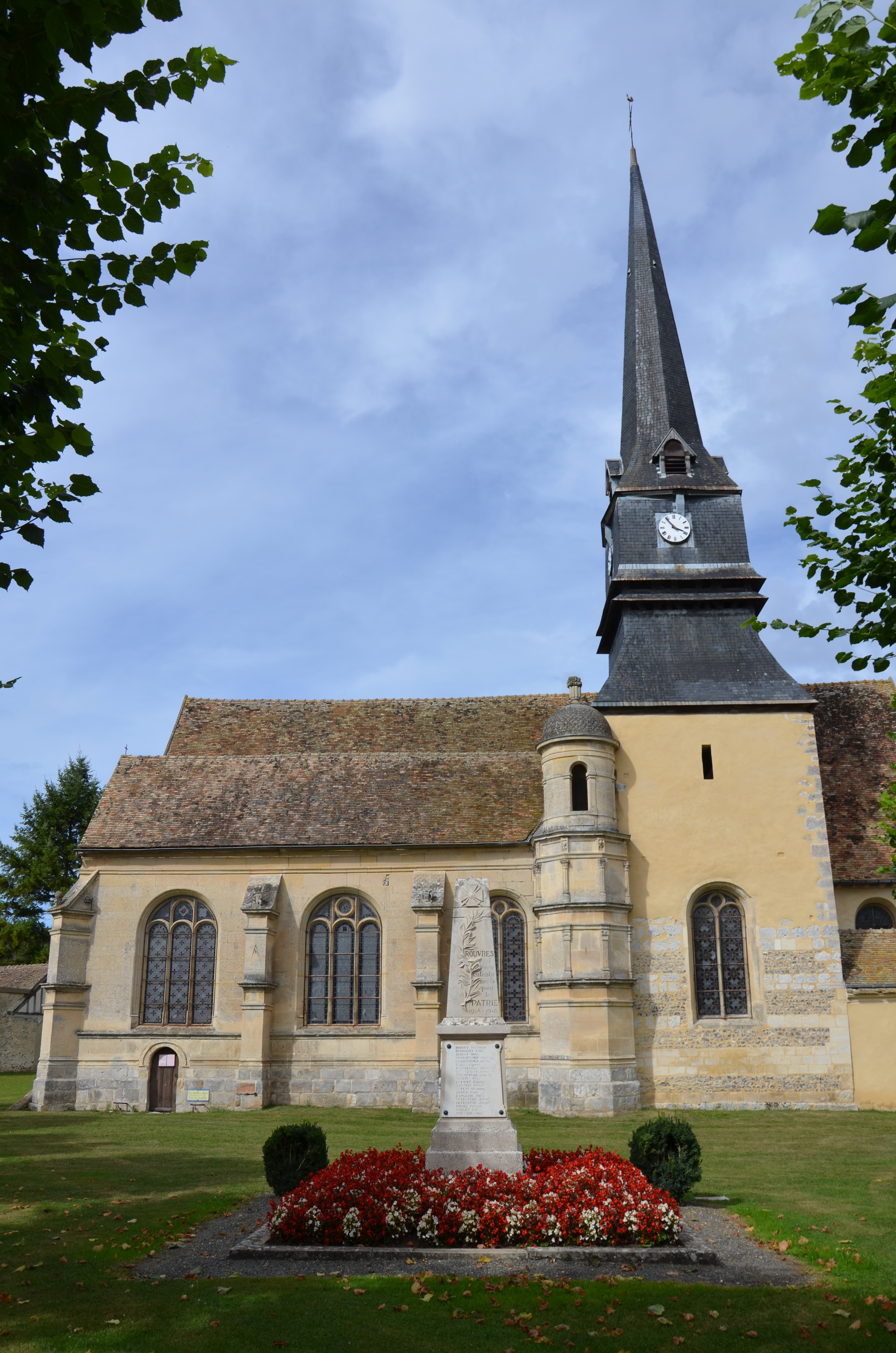
- The church in Rouvres

- Coat of arms
- Location of Rouvres
- Location within France Location within Centre-Val de Loire
- Coordinates: 48°50′25″N 1°29′08″E
- Country: France
- Region: Centre-Val de Loire
- Department: Eure-et-Loir
- Arrondissement: Dreux
- Canton: Anet
- Intercommunality: CA Pays de Dreux

Government
  - Mayor (2021–2026): Nathalie Milward
- Area^{1}: 16.24 km^{2} (6.27 sq mi)
- Elevation: 72 m (236 ft)
- Highest elevation: 132 m (433 ft)
- Lowest elevation: 64 m (210 ft)
- Population (2023): 802
  - Density: 49.4/km^{2} (128/sq mi)
- Time zone: UTC+01:00 (CET)
  - Summer (DST): UTC+02:00 (CEST)
- INSEE/Postal code: 28321 /28260
- ^{1} French Land Register data, which excludes lakes, ponds, glaciers > 1 km^{2} (0.386 sq mi or 247 acres) and river estuaries.

Rouvres (French pronunciation: [ʁuvʁ]) is a commune in the Eure-et-Loir department in northern France.

== Population ==
Historical population
Year	Pop.	±% p.a.
1968	400	—
1975	450	+1.70%
1982	604	+4.29%
1990	666	+1.23%
1999	775	+1.70%
2007	874	+1.51%
2012	834	−0.93%
2017	823	−0.27%
2023	802	−0.43%
Source: INSEE

== See also ==
- Communes of the Eure-et-Loir department
