= Ardelles =

- Commune
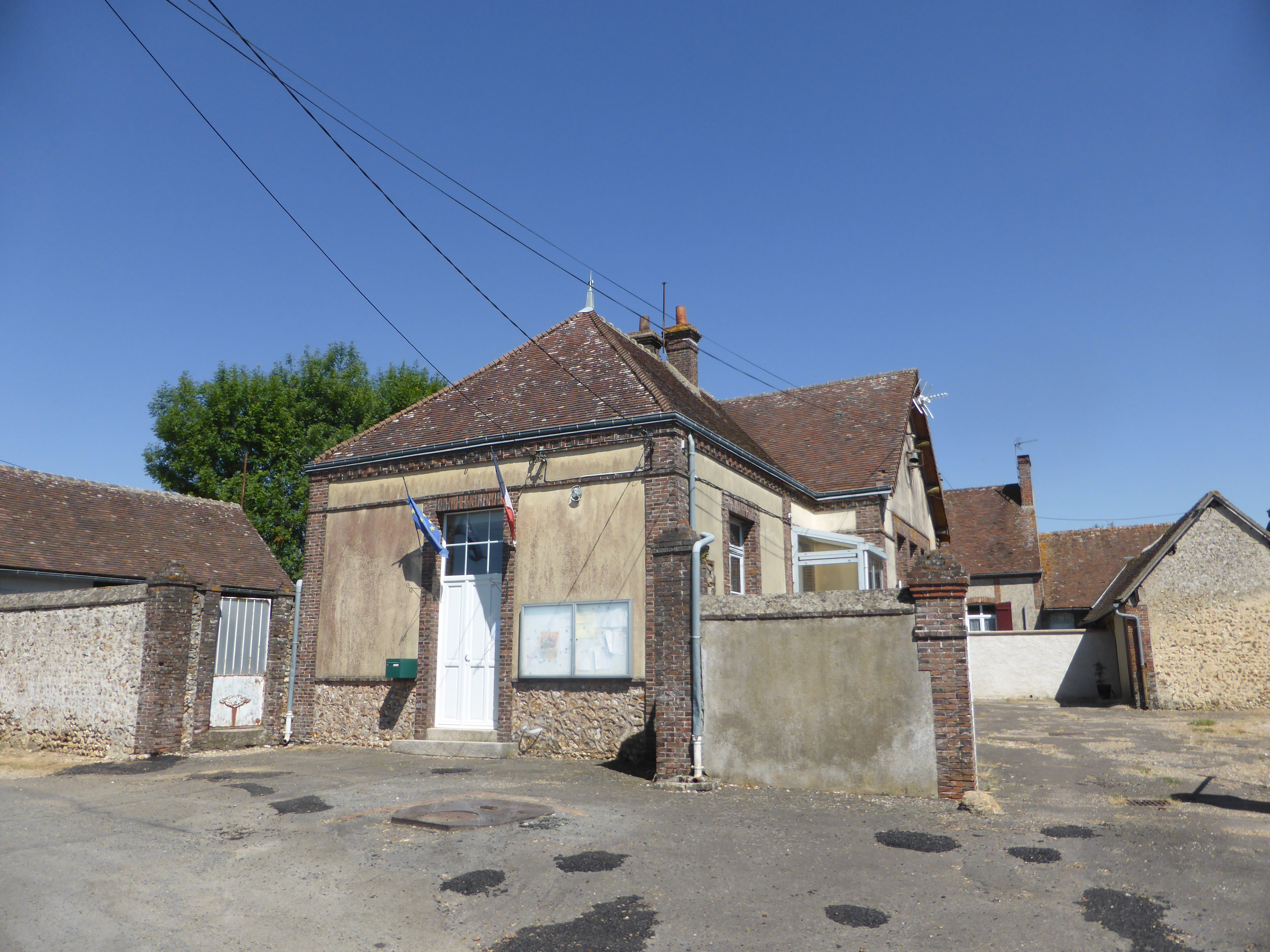
- The town hall in Ardelles
- Location of Ardelles
- Location within France Location within Centre-Val de Loire
- Coordinates: 48°32′47″N 1°10′25″E
- Country: France
- Region: Centre-Val de Loire
- Department: Eure-et-Loir
- Arrondissement: Dreux
- Canton: Saint-Lubin-des-Joncherets
- Intercommunality: CA Pays de Dreux

Government
  - Mayor (2020–2026): Véronique Detoc
- Area^{1}: 10.4 km^{2} (4.0 sq mi)
- Elevation: 228 m (748 ft)
- Highest elevation: 247 m (810 ft)
- Lowest elevation: 193 m (633 ft)
- Population (2023): 211
  - Density: 20.3/km^{2} (52.5/sq mi)
- Time zone: UTC+01:00 (CET)
  - Summer (DST): UTC+02:00 (CEST)
- INSEE/Postal code: 28008 /28170
- ^{1} French Land Register data, which excludes lakes, ponds, glaciers > 1 km^{2} (0.386 sq mi or 247 acres) and river estuaries.

Ardelles (French pronunciation: [aʁdɛl]) is a commune in the Eure-et-Loir department in northern France. It is located at an average altitude of 227 metres, and belongs to the arrondissement of Dreux.

== Geography ==
The Commune along with another 70 communes shares part of a 47,681 hectare, Natura 2000 conservation area, called the Forêts et étangs du Perche.

== Population ==
Historical population
Year	Pop.	±% p.a.
1968	143	—
1975	112	−3.43%
1982	114	+0.25%
1990	155	+3.92%
1999	162	+0.49%
2007	212	+3.42%
2012	211	−0.09%
2017	200	−1.07%
2023	211	+0.90%
Source: INSEE

== See also ==
- Communes of the Eure-et-Loir department
