= Marchezais =

- Commune
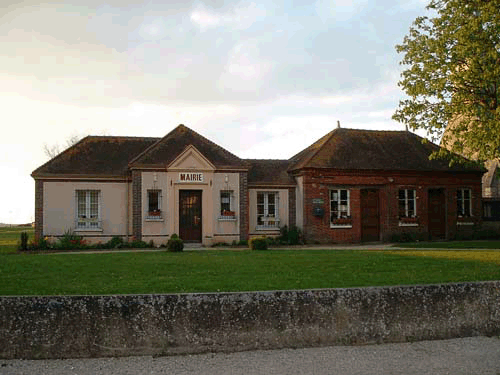
- Town hall

- Coat of arms
- Location of Marchezais
- Location within France Location within Centre-Val de Loire
- Coordinates: 48°46′23″N 1°30′32″E
- Country: France
- Region: Centre-Val de Loire
- Department: Eure-et-Loir
- Arrondissement: Dreux
- Canton: Anet
- Intercommunality: CA Pays de Dreux

Government
  - Mayor (2020–2026): Jérôme Depondt
- Area^{1}: 2.19 km^{2} (0.85 sq mi)
- Elevation: 138 m (453 ft)
- Highest elevation: 139 m (456 ft)
- Lowest elevation: 132 m (433 ft)
- Population (2023): 413
  - Density: 189/km^{2} (488/sq mi)
- Time zone: UTC+01:00 (CET)
  - Summer (DST): UTC+02:00 (CEST)
- INSEE/Postal code: 28235 /28410
- ^{1} French Land Register data, which excludes lakes, ponds, glaciers > 1 km^{2} (0.386 sq mi or 247 acres) and river estuaries.

Marchezais (French pronunciation: [maʁʃəzɛ]) is a commune in the Eure-et-Loir department in northern France.

== Population ==
Historical population
Year	Pop.	±% p.a.
1968	47	—
1975	99	+11.23%
1982	169	+7.94%
1990	221	+3.41%
1999	208	−0.67%
2007	280	+3.79%
2012	291	+0.77%
2017	342	+3.28%
2023	413	+3.19%
Source: INSEE

== See also ==
- Communes of the Eure-et-Loir department
