= Saussay, Eure-et-Loir =

Saussay
- Commune
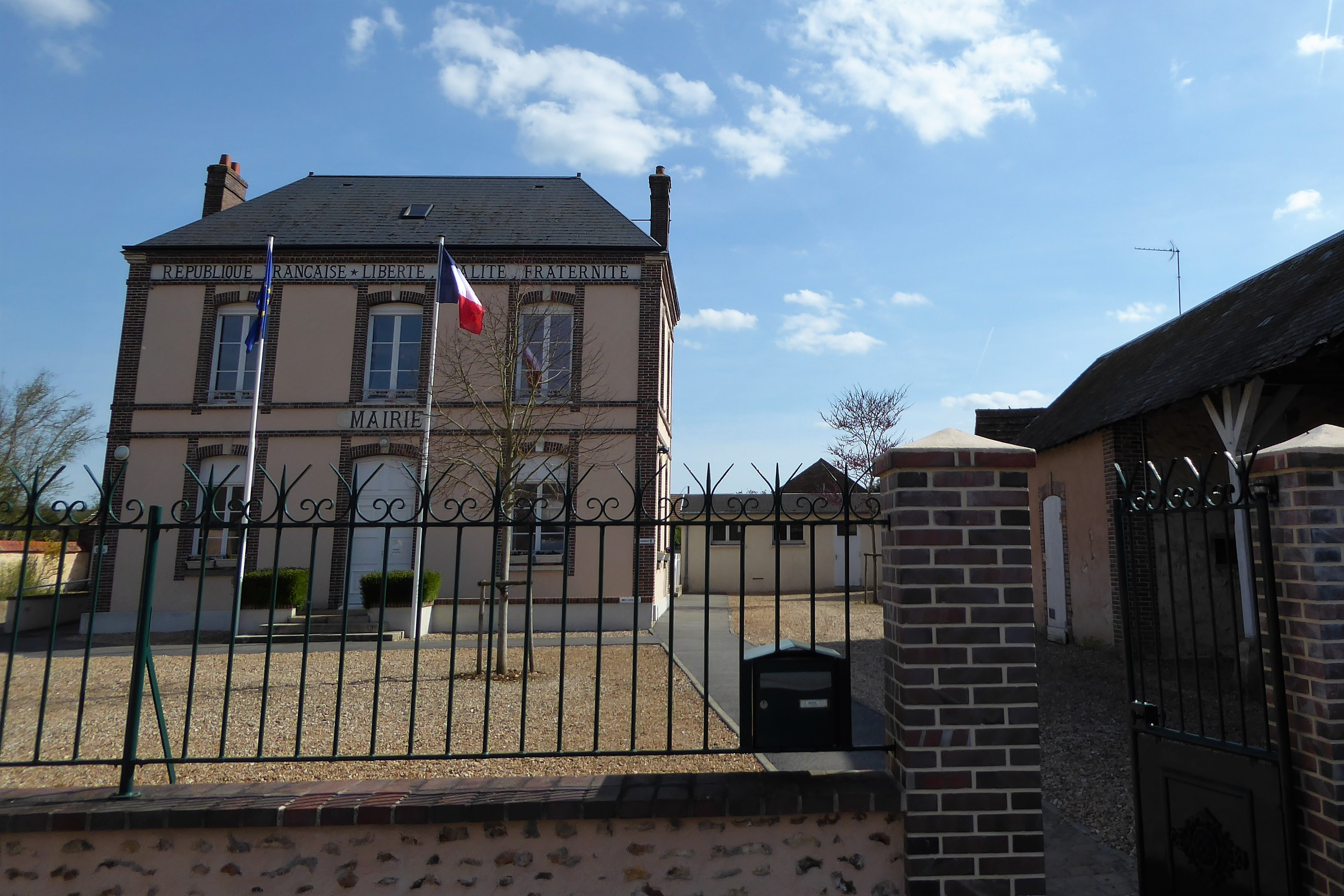
- The town hall in Saussay
- Location of Saussay
- Location within France Location within Centre-Val de Loire
- Coordinates: 48°51′35″N 1°24′49″E
- Country: France
- Region: Centre-Val de Loire
- Department: Eure-et-Loir
- Arrondissement: Dreux
- Canton: Anet
- Intercommunality: CA Pays de Dreux

Government
  - Mayor (2020–2026): Patrick Gourdes
- Area^{1}: 4.59 km^{2} (1.77 sq mi)
- Elevation: 60 m (200 ft)
- Highest elevation: 122 m (400 ft)
- Lowest elevation: 60 m (200 ft)
- Population (2023): 1,080
  - Density: 235/km^{2} (609/sq mi)
- Time zone: UTC+01:00 (CET)
  - Summer (DST): UTC+02:00 (CEST)
- INSEE/Postal code: 28371 /28260
- ^{1} French Land Register data, which excludes lakes, ponds, glaciers > 1 km^{2} (0.386 sq mi or 247 acres) and river estuaries.

Saussay (French pronunciation: [sosɛ]) is a commune in the Eure-et-Loir department and Centre-Val de Loire region of north-central France. It lies 47 km north of Chartres and some 70 km west of Paris.

== Population ==
Historical population

Year	Pop.	±% p.a.
1793	225	—
1821	314	+1.20%
1846	361	+0.56%
1872	327	−0.38%
1901	309	−0.20%
1926	417	+1.21%
1946	423	+0.07%
1962	400	−0.35%
1968	463	+2.47%

Year	Pop.	±% p.a.
1975	601	+3.80%
1982	650	+1.13%
1990	900	+4.15%
1999	981	+0.96%
2007	1,053	+0.89%
2012	1,062	+0.17%
2017	1,092	+0.56%
2023	1,080	−0.18%

Source: EHESS and INSEE (1968-2023)

== See also ==
- Communes of the Eure-et-Loir department
