= Saint-Lubin-de-la-Haye =

- Commune
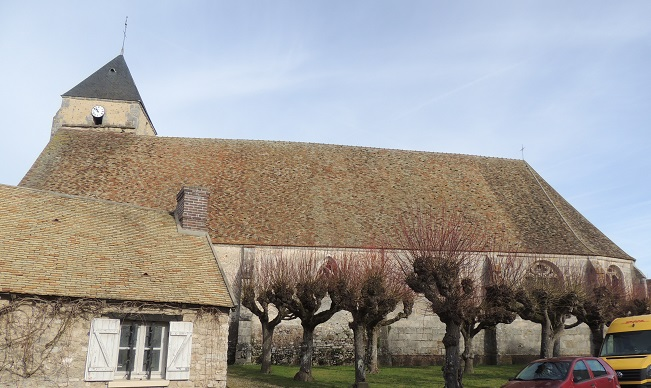
- The church in Saint-Lubin-de-la-Haye

- Coat of arms
- Location of Saint-Lubin-de-la-Haye
- Location within France Location within Centre-Val de Loire
- Coordinates: 48°49′12″N 1°34′20″E
- Country: France
- Region: Centre-Val de Loire
- Department: Eure-et-Loir
- Arrondissement: Dreux
- Canton: Anet
- Intercommunality: Pays houdanais

Government
  - Mayor (2020–2026): Veronique Le Guillous
- Area^{1}: 14.32 km^{2} (5.53 sq mi)
- Elevation: 162 m (531 ft)
- Highest elevation: 136 m (446 ft)
- Lowest elevation: 79 m (259 ft)
- Population (2023): 937
  - Density: 65.4/km^{2} (169/sq mi)
- Time zone: UTC+01:00 (CET)
  - Summer (DST): UTC+02:00 (CEST)
- INSEE/Postal code: 28347 /28410
- ^{1} French Land Register data, which excludes lakes, ponds, glaciers > 1 km^{2} (0.386 sq mi or 247 acres) and river estuaries.

Saint-Lubin-de-la-Haye (French pronunciation: [sɛ̃ lybɛ̃ də la ɛ]) is a commune in the Eure-et-Loir department in northern France.

== Population ==
Historical population
Year	Pop.	±% p.a.
1968	392	—
1975	432	+1.40%
1982	559	+3.75%
1990	630	+1.51%
1999	786	+2.49%
2007	910	+1.85%
2012	897	−0.29%
2017	956	+1.28%
2023	937	−0.33%
Source: INSEE

== See also ==
- Communes of the Eure-et-Loir department
