= Ploubezre =

Ploubezre Ploubêr
- Commune
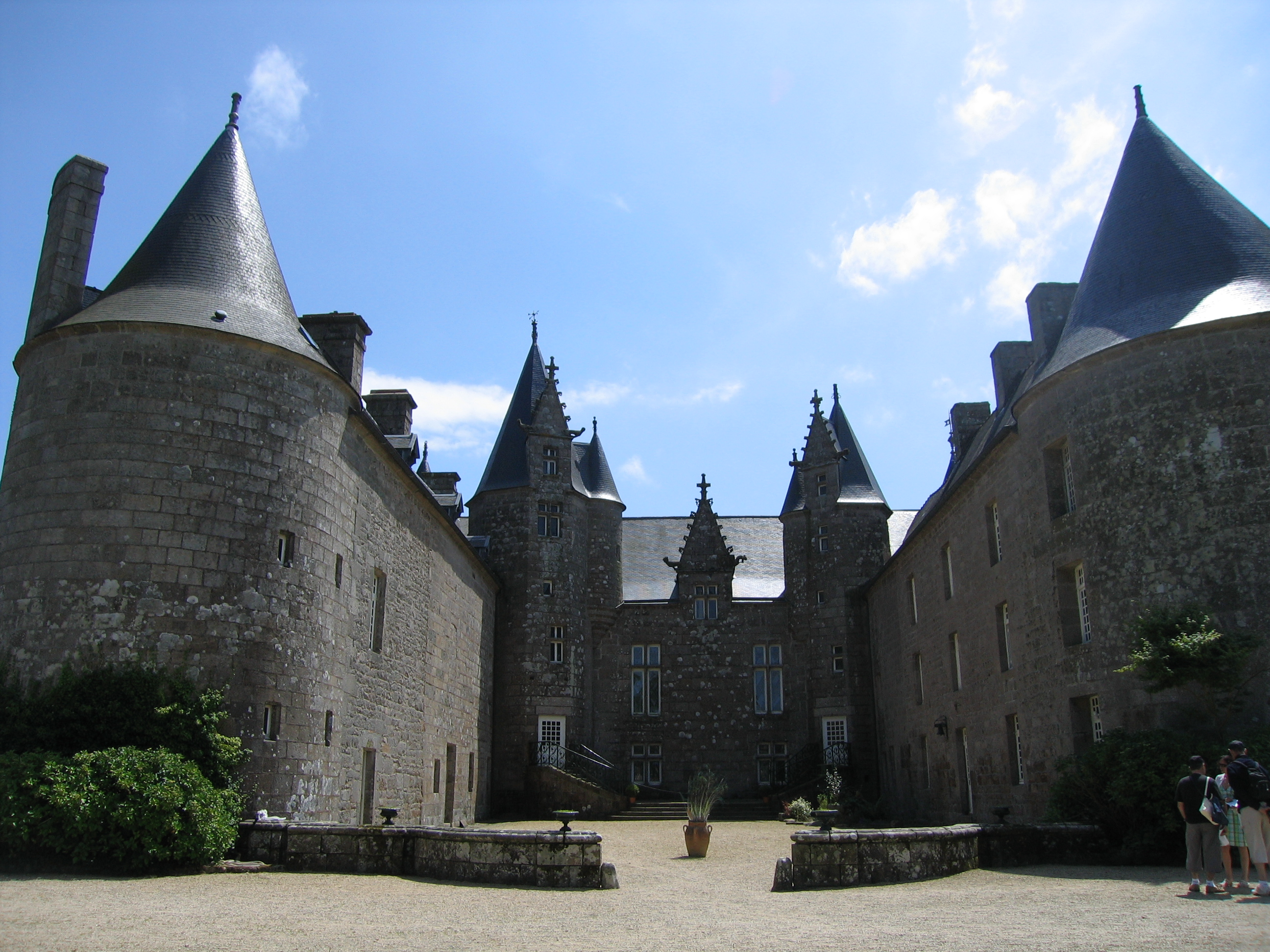
- Château Kergrist, in Ploubezre
- Location of Ploubezre
- Location within France Location within Brittany
- Coordinates: 48°42′19″N 3°26′51″W
- Country: France
- Region: Brittany
- Department: Côtes-d'Armor
- Arrondissement: Lannion
- Canton: Plestin-les-Grèves
- Intercommunality: Lannion-Trégor Communauté

Government
  - Mayor (2020–2026): Brigitte Gourhant
- Area^{1}: 31.14 km^{2} (12.02 sq mi)
- Highest elevation: 114 m (374 ft)
- Lowest elevation: 3 m (9.8 ft)
- Population (2023): 3,780
  - Density: 121/km^{2} (314/sq mi)
- Time zone: UTC+01:00 (CET)
  - Summer (DST): UTC+02:00 (CEST)
- INSEE/Postal code: 22211 /22300
- ^{1} French Land Register data, which excludes lakes, ponds, glaciers > 1 km^{2} (0.386 sq mi or 247 acres) and river estuaries.

Ploubezre (French pronunciation: [plubɛʁ]; Breton: Ploubêr) is a commune in the Côtes-d'Armor department of Brittany in northwestern France. The village is twinned with the village of Llanbradach in Wales.

== Population ==
Inhabitants of Ploubezre are called ploubezriens in French.

Historical population
Year	Pop.	±% p.a.
1968	1,934	—
1975	2,196	+1.83%
1982	2,652	+2.73%
1990	2,709	+0.27%
1999	2,624	−0.35%
2007	2,955	+1.50%
2012	3,633	+4.22%
2017	3,600	−0.18%
2023	3,780	+0.82%
Source: INSEE

== Breton language ==
In 2008, 6.45% of primary school children attended bilingual schools.

== See also ==
- Communes of the Côtes-d'Armor department
- The Five Crosses, a Crucifix monument nearby
