= The Five Crosses =

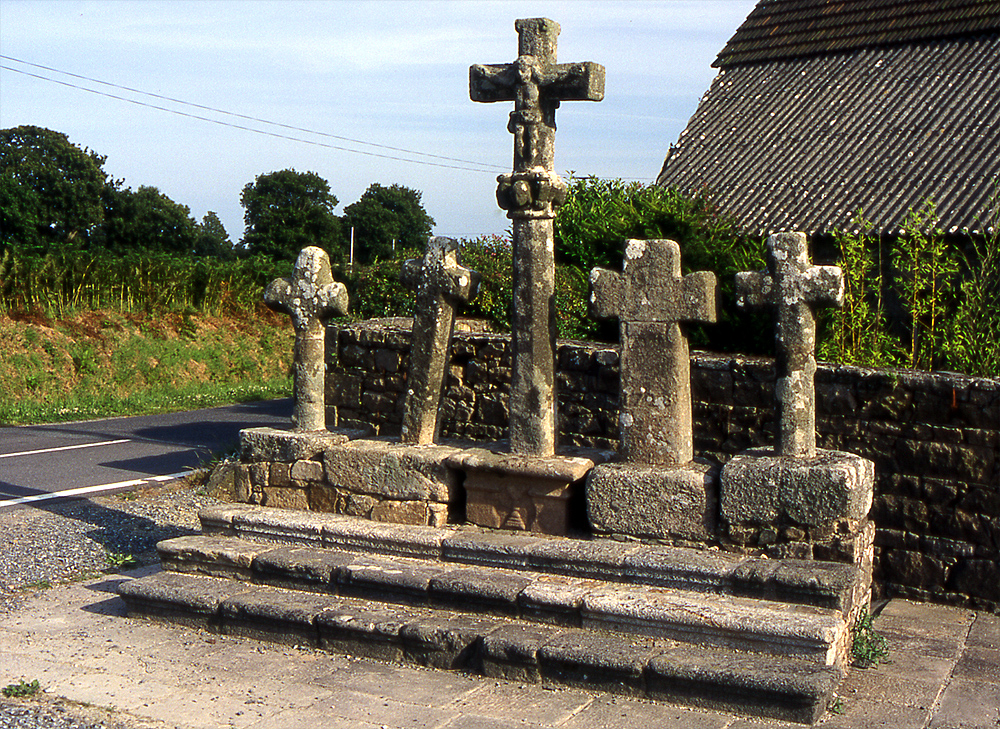
The Five Crosses of Ploubezre

The Five Crosses (in French, Les Cinq Croix) are a set of stone crosses at Ploubezre, near Lannion, Côtes-du-Nord, in Brittany, France, classified as a historic monument by a decree of 7 December 1925 and, as a group, attributed to the 18th century.

The central cross is placed on a tall pillar and has a figure of Christ on one side and of Mary the mother of Jesus on the other. The other crosses are plain except for that immediately to the right of the central cross, which bears the date 1728. The base of another is inscribed with the date 1733.

Differing accounts attribute the central cross to the 15th or 16th century and consider the others to be medieval, while local lore has it that they were erected to commemorate a victory over English invaders. It is also said that they were assembled from various nearby places by the rector of the church to preserve them from destruction or on the occasion of a religious mission, perhaps in 1728 or 1733.

The 1826 land survey shows that at that time the crosses stood, with a different orientation, along the road at about 25 metres from their present position.

== Interpretation by E. W. Bullinger ==
Groups of crosses are found also in other parts of Brittany gathered together for reasons that are now difficult to explain. Examples are a pair in front of a chapel at Croaziou and three at Pont Hir.

However, the English theologian E. W. Bullinger (1837–1913) attached special significance to the group of five at Ploubezre, claiming that it was a confirmation of his theory that Jesus was crucified with four, not just two, criminals: two thieves and two other malefactors.

== Another Cinq Croix ==
Outside of Brittany, another French Cinq Croix (Five Crosses) exists, reputedly a monument to five brothers killed in the 11th century in battle against William the Conqueror. Unlike those at Ploubezre, these five crosses are not placed side by side. The monument is at the intersection of route D933 (Route de Houdan) and D136 north toward Marchefroy.
