= Canton of Anet =

Coordinates: 48.86°N 1.44°E

The canton of Anet is an administrative division of the Eure-et-Loir department, northern France. Its borders were modified at the French canton reorganisation which came into effect in March 2015. Its seat is in Anet.

It consists of the following communes:

1. Abondant
2. Anet
3. Berchères-sur-Vesgre
4. Boncourt
5. Boutigny-Prouais
6. Broué
7. Bû
8. La Chapelle-Forainvilliers
9. La Chaussée-d'Ivry
10. Cherisy
11. Germainville
12. Gilles
13. Goussainville
14. Guainville
15. Havelu
16. Marchezais
17. Le Mesnil-Simon
18. Montreuil
19. Oulins
20. Rouvres
21. Saint-Lubin-de-la-Haye
22. Saint-Ouen-Marchefroy
23. Saussay
24. Serville
25. Sorel-Moussel
