= Boutigny-Prouais =

- Commune
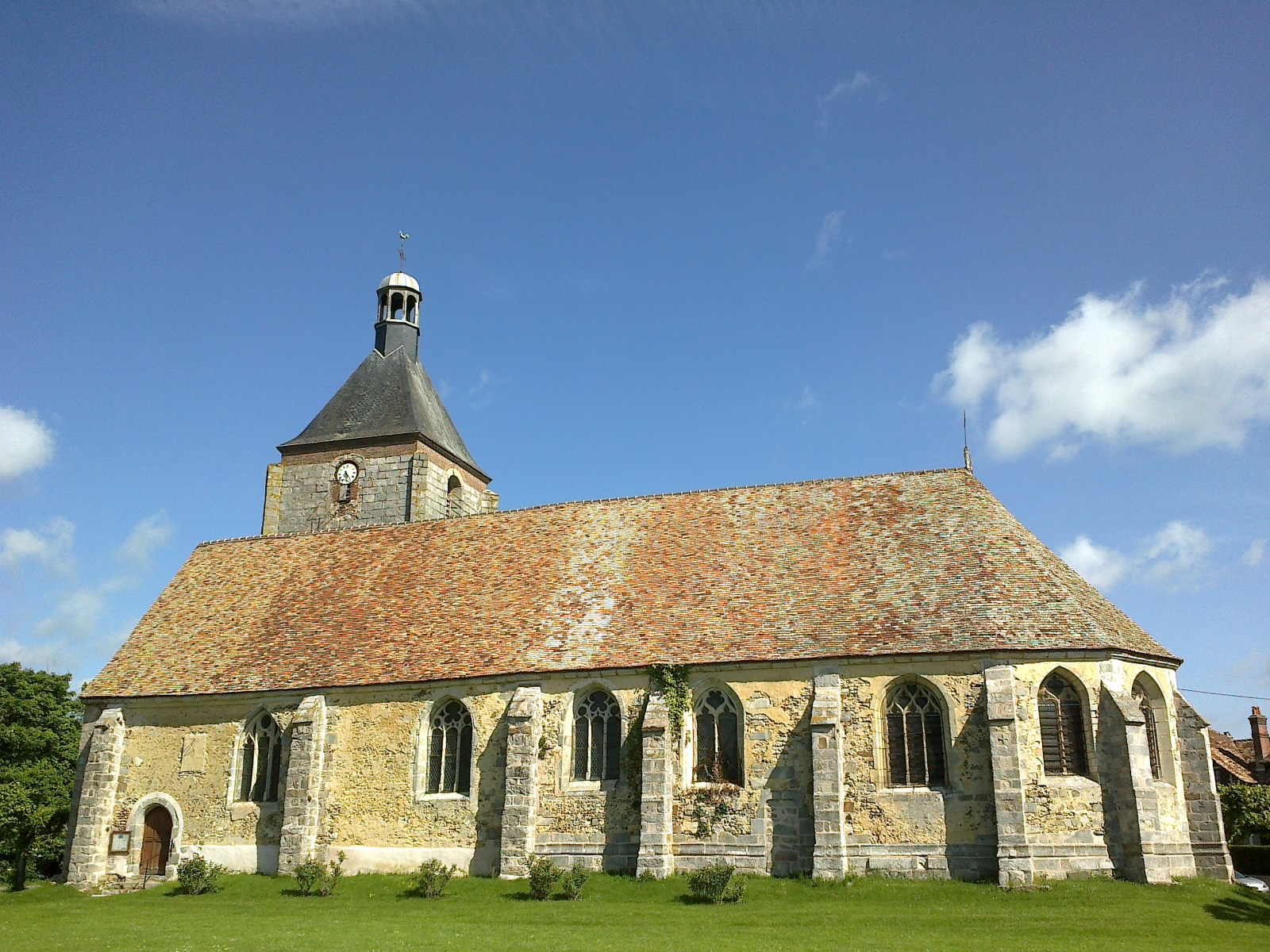
- The church in Prouais

- Coat of arms
- Location of Boutigny-Prouais
- Location within France Location within Centre-Val de Loire
- Coordinates: 48°44′44″N 1°35′14″E
- Country: France
- Region: Centre-Val de Loire
- Department: Eure-et-Loir
- Arrondissement: Dreux
- Canton: Anet
- Intercommunality: Pays houdanais

Government
  - Mayor (2020–2026): Corine Le Roux
- Area^{1}: 32.5 km^{2} (12.5 sq mi)
- Elevation: 139 m (456 ft)
- Highest elevation: 173 m (568 ft)
- Lowest elevation: 109 m (358 ft)
- Population (2023): 1,704
  - Density: 52.4/km^{2} (136/sq mi)
- Time zone: UTC+01:00 (CET)
  - Summer (DST): UTC+02:00 (CEST)
- INSEE/Postal code: 28056 /28410
- ^{1} French Land Register data, which excludes lakes, ponds, glaciers > 1 km^{2} (0.386 sq mi or 247 acres) and river estuaries.

Boutigny-Prouais (French pronunciation: [butiɲi pʁuɛ]) is a commune in the Eure-et-Loir department in northern France.

It consists of its two market towns, Boutigny-sur-Opton and Prouais, and its 14 hamlets, Allemant, Bauchêne, Beauterne, Bouchemont, Buchelet, Cloches, Dannemarie, La Musse, Le Bois-des-Près, Le Mesnil-sur-Opton, Les Joncs, Saint-Projet, Rosay and Saussay.

== Geography ==
The commune is geographically situated on the crossroads between the ‘Ile de France’ region, Lower Normandie region and the Centre region, only 60 km westwards of Paris. It is located between the towns of Houdan and Dreux on the border between the departments of Eure-et-Loir and Yvelines.

== History ==
The names Boutigny (Boteneium) and Prouais (Proeis) have been tracked back to the eleventh century in archives of the Eure-et-Loir department. However, tools that have been discovered on the banks of the Opton River and in the Musse hamlet dated back to prehistoric times confirm that the area has been occupied by men since ancient times.

The history of the two villages is linked to the vagaries of time with shared tragedies and destructions caused by invasions, epidemics, hunger, wars and climate conditions.

The wars did not spare the churches in Boutigny-sur-Opton and Prouais that were rebuilt or redesigned in the sixteenth century. Since those days, the tower of the church in Prouais has kept its charm as a military defence tower. The church in Boutigny-sur-Opton was devastated by a fire in 1947, but rebuilt to its glamour again in 1957.

From the nineteenth century, the boundaries of the commune have changed. In 1846, by order of King Louis Philippe, the commune of Saint-Project, with its hamlets Le Mesnil-sur-Opton and Dannemarie, was united with Boutigny. In January 1973 the two communes Prouais and Boutigny were merged and became Boutigny-Proauis. Boutigny-Prouais joined in 1998 the communality of communes of the county of Houdan (Communauté de communes du pays houdanais).

== Population ==
Historical population
Year	Pop.	±% p.a.
1968	785	—
1975	757	−0.52%
1982	1,087	+5.30%
1990	1,318	+2.44%
1999	1,533	+1.69%
2007	1,663	+1.02%
2012	1,871	+2.38%
2017	1,745	−1.38%
2023	1,704	−0.40%
Source: INSEE

== See also ==
- Communes of the Eure-et-Loir department
