= Anet =

- Commune
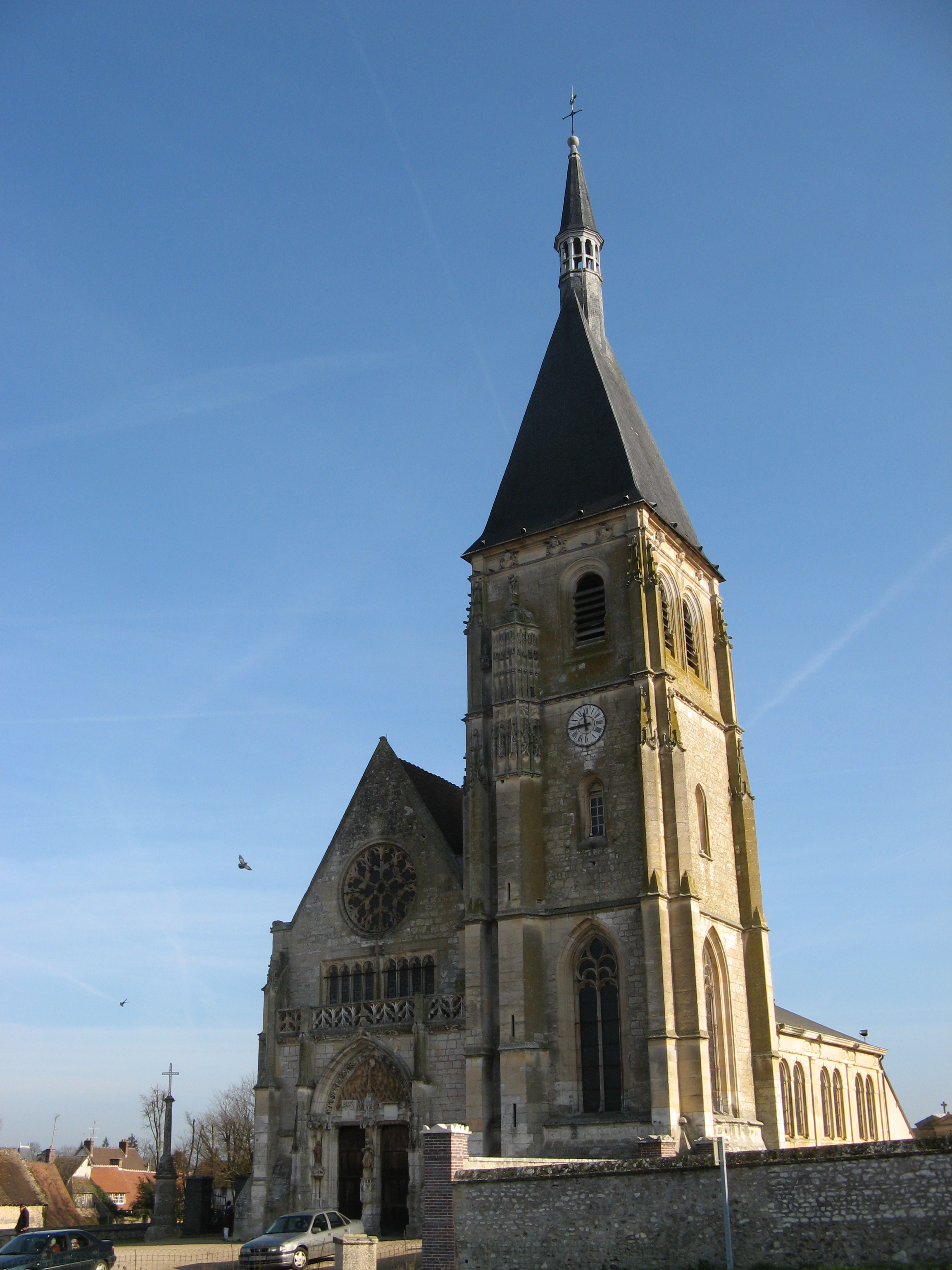

- Coat of arms
- Location of Anet
- Location within France Location within Centre-Val de Loire
- Coordinates: 48°51′26″N 1°26′21″E
- Country: France
- Region: Centre-Val de Loire
- Department: Eure-et-Loir
- Arrondissement: Dreux
- Canton: Anet
- Intercommunality: CA Pays de Dreux

Government
  - Mayor (2020–2026): Aliette Le Bihan
- Area^{1}: 7.85 km^{2} (3.03 sq mi)
- Highest elevation: 132 m (433 ft)
- Lowest elevation: 57 m (187 ft)
- Population (2023): 2,721
  - Density: 347/km^{2} (898/sq mi)
- Time zone: UTC+01:00 (CET)
  - Summer (DST): UTC+02:00 (CEST)
- INSEE/Postal code: 28007 /28260
- ^{1} French Land Register data, which excludes lakes, ponds, glaciers > 1 km^{2} (0.386 sq mi or 247 acres) and river estuaries.

Anet (French pronunciation: [anɛt]) is a commune in the Eure-et-Loir department in the Centre-Val de Loire region of north-central France. It lies 14 km north-northeast of Dreux between the rivers Eure and Vesgre, the latter flowing into the former some 4 km northeast of Anet town hall.

== History ==
The town possesses the remains of a castle, the Château d'Anet, built in the middle of the 16th century by Henry II for Diana of Poitiers. Near it is the plain of Ivry-la-Bataille, where Henry IV defeated the armies of the Catholic League in 1590.

== Demographics ==
Historical population

Year	Pop.	±% p.a.
1793	1,475	—
1800	1,557	+0.78%
1806	1,486	−0.77%
1821	1,322	−0.78%
1831	1,416	+0.69%
1836	1,422	+0.08%
1841	1,409	−0.18%
1846	1,401	−0.11%
1851	1,400	−0.01%
1856	1,344	−0.81%
1861	1,406	+0.91%
1866	1,418	+0.17%
1872	1,447	+0.34%
1876	1,465	+0.31%
1881	1,447	−0.25%
1886	1,466	+0.26%
1891	1,431	−0.48%
1896	1,395	−0.51%
1901	1,316	−1.16%

Year	Pop.	±% p.a.
1906	1,372	+0.84%
1911	1,395	+0.33%
1921	1,256	−1.04%
1926	1,239	−0.27%
1931	1,252	+0.21%
1936	1,235	−0.27%
1946	1,294	+0.47%
1954	1,215	−0.78%
1962	1,341	+1.24%
1968	1,464	+1.47%
1975	1,700	+2.16%
1982	2,297	+4.39%
1990	2,696	+2.02%
1999	2,651	−0.19%
2007	2,626	−0.12%
2012	2,673	+0.36%
2017	2,733	+0.44%
2023	2,721	−0.07%

Source: EHESS and INSEE (1968-2023)

== Popular culture ==
The opening scene of the James Bond film "Thunderball" was shot in Anet.

== See also ==
- Communes of the Eure-et-Loir department
