= Bû =

- Commune
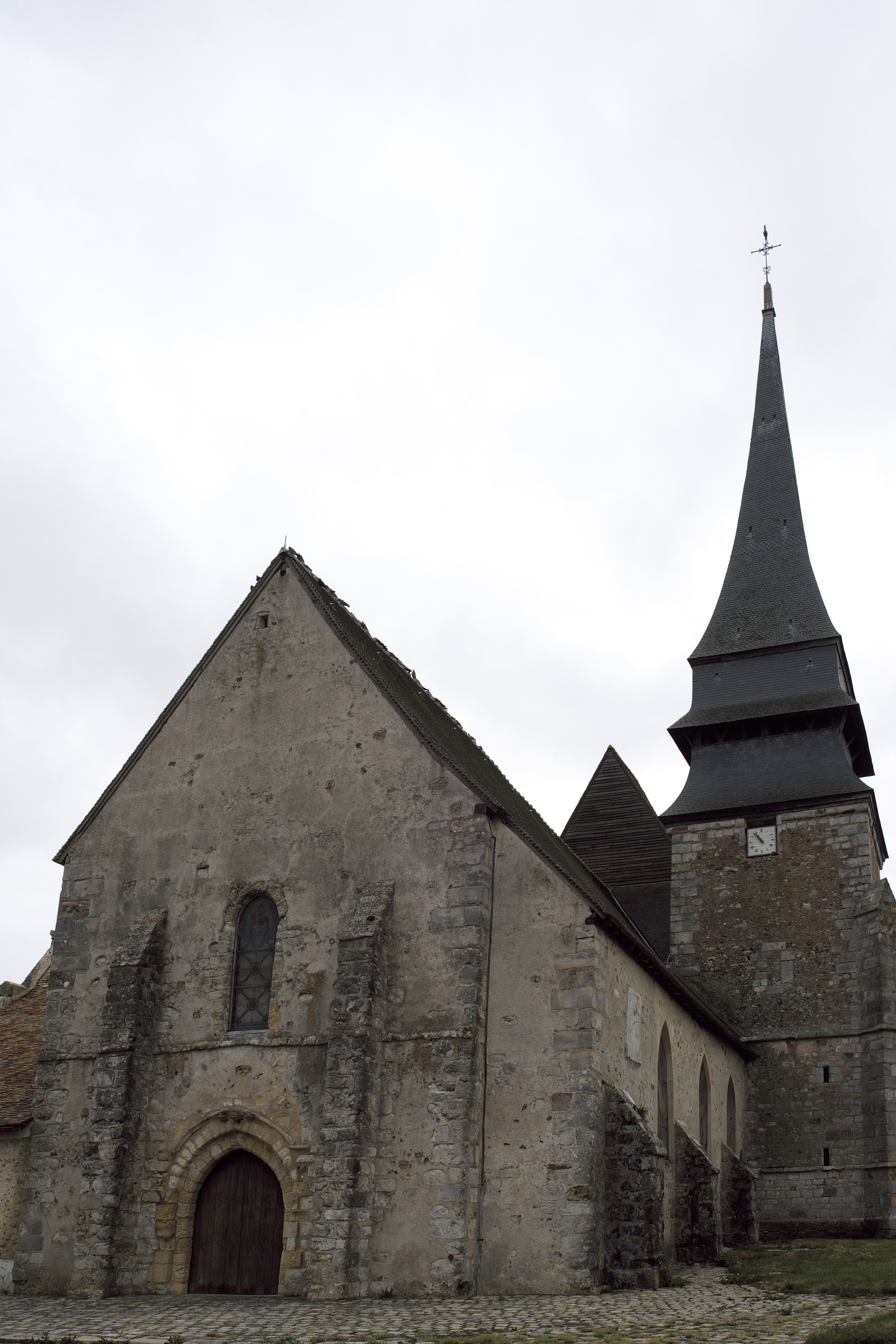
- The church in Bû

- Coat of arms
- Location of Bû
- Location within France Location within Centre-Val de Loire
- Coordinates: 48°47′50″N 1°29′47″E
- Country: France
- Region: Centre-Val de Loire
- Department: Eure-et-Loir
- Arrondissement: Dreux
- Canton: Anet
- Intercommunality: CA Pays de Dreux

Government
  - Mayor (2020–2026): Pierre Sanier
- Area^{1}: 22.6 km^{2} (8.7 sq mi)
- Highest elevation: 141 m (463 ft)
- Lowest elevation: 89 m (292 ft)
- Population (2023): 2,077
  - Density: 91.9/km^{2} (238/sq mi)
- Time zone: UTC+01:00 (CET)
  - Summer (DST): UTC+02:00 (CEST)
- INSEE/Postal code: 28064 /28410
- ^{1} French Land Register data, which excludes lakes, ponds, glaciers > 1 km^{2} (0.386 sq mi or 247 acres) and river estuaries.

Bû (French pronunciation: [by]) is a commune in the Eure-et-Loir department in northern France.

== Population ==
Historical population
Year	Pop.	±% p.a.
1968	778	—
1975	861	+1.46%
1982	1,062	+3.04%
1990	1,419	+3.69%
1999	1,689	+1.95%
2007	1,816	+0.91%
2012	1,870	+0.59%
2017	1,963	+0.98%
2023	2,077	+0.95%
Source: INSEE

== See also ==
- Communes of the Eure-et-Loir department
