= Clévilliers =

- Commune
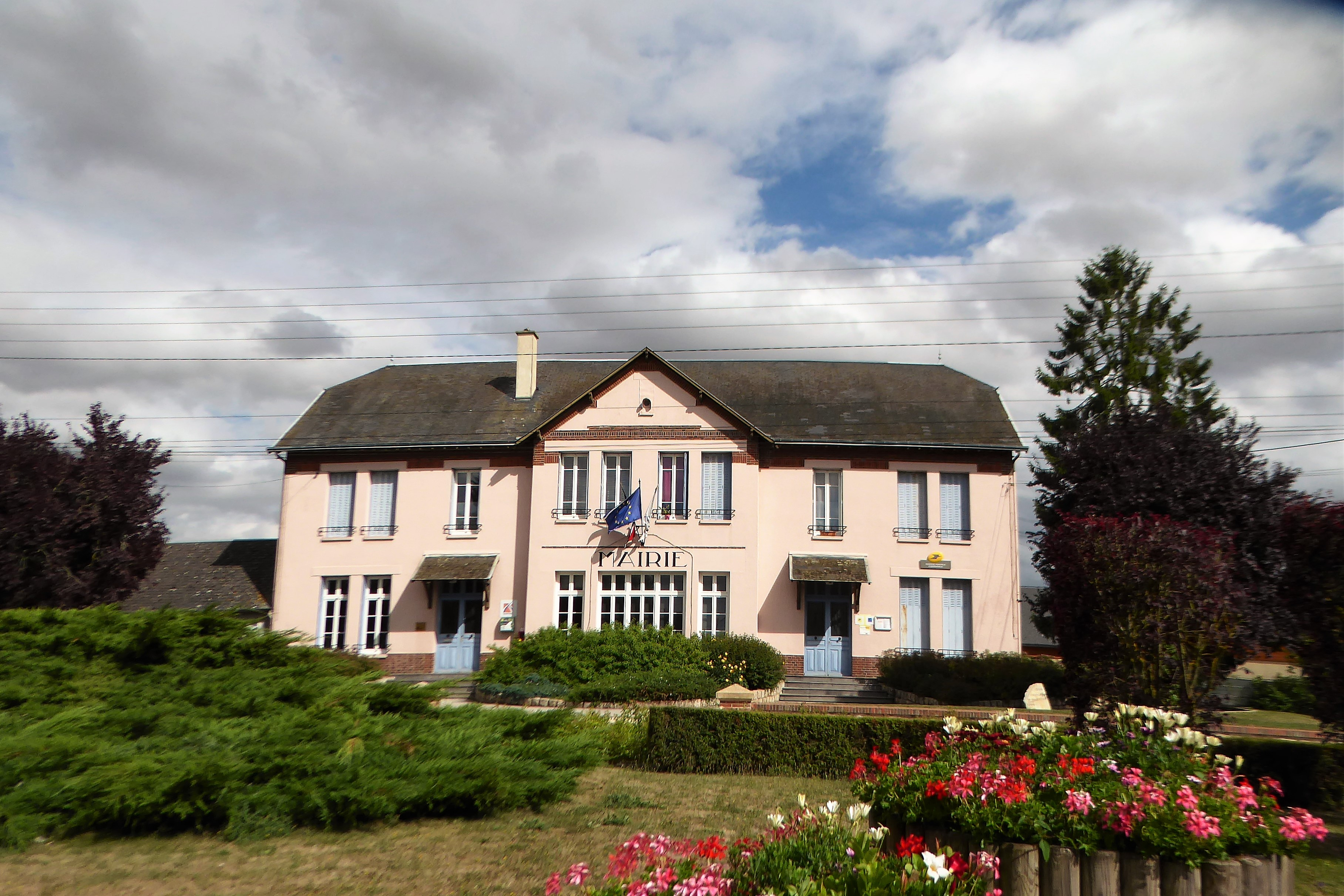
- The town hall in Clévilliers
- Location of Clévilliers
- Location within France Location within Centre-Val de Loire
- Coordinates: 48°32′36″N 1°23′19″E
- Country: France
- Region: Centre-Val de Loire
- Department: Eure-et-Loir
- Arrondissement: Chartres
- Canton: Chartres-1
- Intercommunality: CA Chartres Métropole

Government
  - Mayor (2020–2026): Alain Bellamy
- Area^{1}: 15.78 km^{2} (6.09 sq mi)
- Elevation: 199 m (653 ft)
- Highest elevation: 215 m (705 ft)
- Lowest elevation: 171 m (561 ft)
- Population (2023): 765
  - Density: 48.5/km^{2} (126/sq mi)
- Time zone: UTC+01:00 (CET)
  - Summer (DST): UTC+02:00 (CEST)
- INSEE/Postal code: 28102 /28300
- ^{1} French Land Register data, which excludes lakes, ponds, glaciers > 1 km^{2} (0.386 sq mi or 247 acres) and river estuaries.

Clévilliers (French pronunciation: [klevilje]) is a commune in the Eure-et-Loir department and Centre-Val de Loire region of north-central France. It lies 13 km north-west of Chartres and some 80 km west-south-west of Paris.

The Vacheresses stream flows through the commune, which is bordered by Tremblay-les-Villages (north), Challet (east), Berchères-Saint-Germain (south-east), Briconville (south), and Mittainvilliers-Vérigny (south-west).

The eastern border of the Parc naturel régional du Perche, an area of outstanding natural beauty, lies less than 25 km west of Clévilliers

== Population ==
Historical population
Year	Pop.	±% p.a.
1968	403	—
1975	378	−0.91%
1982	452	+2.59%
1990	549	+2.46%
1999	654	+1.96%
2007	727	+1.33%
2012	723	−0.11%
2017	707	−0.45%
2023	765	+1.32%
Source: INSEE

== See also ==
- Communes of the Eure-et-Loir department
