= Route nationale 154 =

National road 154
- Route nationale 154

Location
- Country: France

Highway system
- Roads in France; Autoroutes; Routes nationales

The RN154 is a trunk road (nationale) in France linking Val-de-Reuil (near Rouen) and Artenay (near Orléans). A substantial portion of the road has been designated part of the outer Paris ring-road (premier cas/first - inner - solution), leading to an increase in traffic volumes. Partly because of this, the road has been or is being upgraded to dual carriageway for much of its length.

== Upgraded sections ==
- Val-de-Reuil-La Madeleine-de-Nonancourt
- La Madeleine-de-Nonancourt-Dreux, (Route nationale 12) under construction
- Dreux bypass, under construction
- Dreux-Chartres, under construction
- Chartres bypass, projected
- Chartres-Artenay, projected

== Route ==
=== Val-de-Reuil to Dreux ===
- Val-de-Reuil
- Louviers
- Pinterville
- Évreux
- Prey
- Chavigny-Bailleul
- La Madeleine-de-Nonancourt

Between La Madeleine-de-Nonancourt and Dreux, the road is called Route nationale 12

=== Dreux to Chartres ===
- Dreux
- Marville-Moutiers-Brûlé
- Le Boullay-Mivoye
- Serazereux
- Challet
- Poisvilliers
- Chartres

=== Chartres to Artenay ===
- Gellainville
- Berchères-les-Pierres
- Allonnes
- Ymonville
- Allaines-Mervilliers
- Artenay
