= Ormoy =

Ormoy is the name of four communes in France:

- Ormoy, Eure-et-Loir
- Ormoy, Haute-Saône
- Ormoy, Yonne
- Ormoy, Essonne
