= Canton of Chartres-1 =

Coordinates: 48.45°N 1.50°E

The canton of Chartres-1 is an administrative division of the Eure-et-Loir department, northern France. It was created at the French canton reorganisation which came into effect in March 2015. Its seat is in Chartres.

It consists of the following communes:

1. Berchères-Saint-Germain
2. Briconville
3. Challet
4. Champhol
5. Chartres (partly)
6. Clévilliers
7. Coltainville
8. Fresnay-le-Gilmert
9. Gasville-Oisème
10. Jouy
11. Poisvilliers
12. Saint-Prest
