= Canton of Dreux-2 =

Canton of France

Coordinates: 48.73°N 1.37°E

The canton of Dreux-2 is an administrative division of the Eure-et-Loir department, northern France. It was created at the French canton reorganisation which came into effect in March 2015. Its seat is in Dreux.

It consists of the following communes:

1. Le Boullay-Mivoye
2. Le Boullay-Thierry
3. Bréchamps
4. Charpont
5. Chaudon
6. Croisilles
7. Dreux (partly)
8. Écluzelles
9. Luray
10. Mézières-en-Drouais
11. Ormoy
12. Ouerre
13. Sainte-Gemme-Moronval
14. Villemeux-sur-Eure
