= Croisilles, Eure-et-Loir =

Croisilles
- Commune
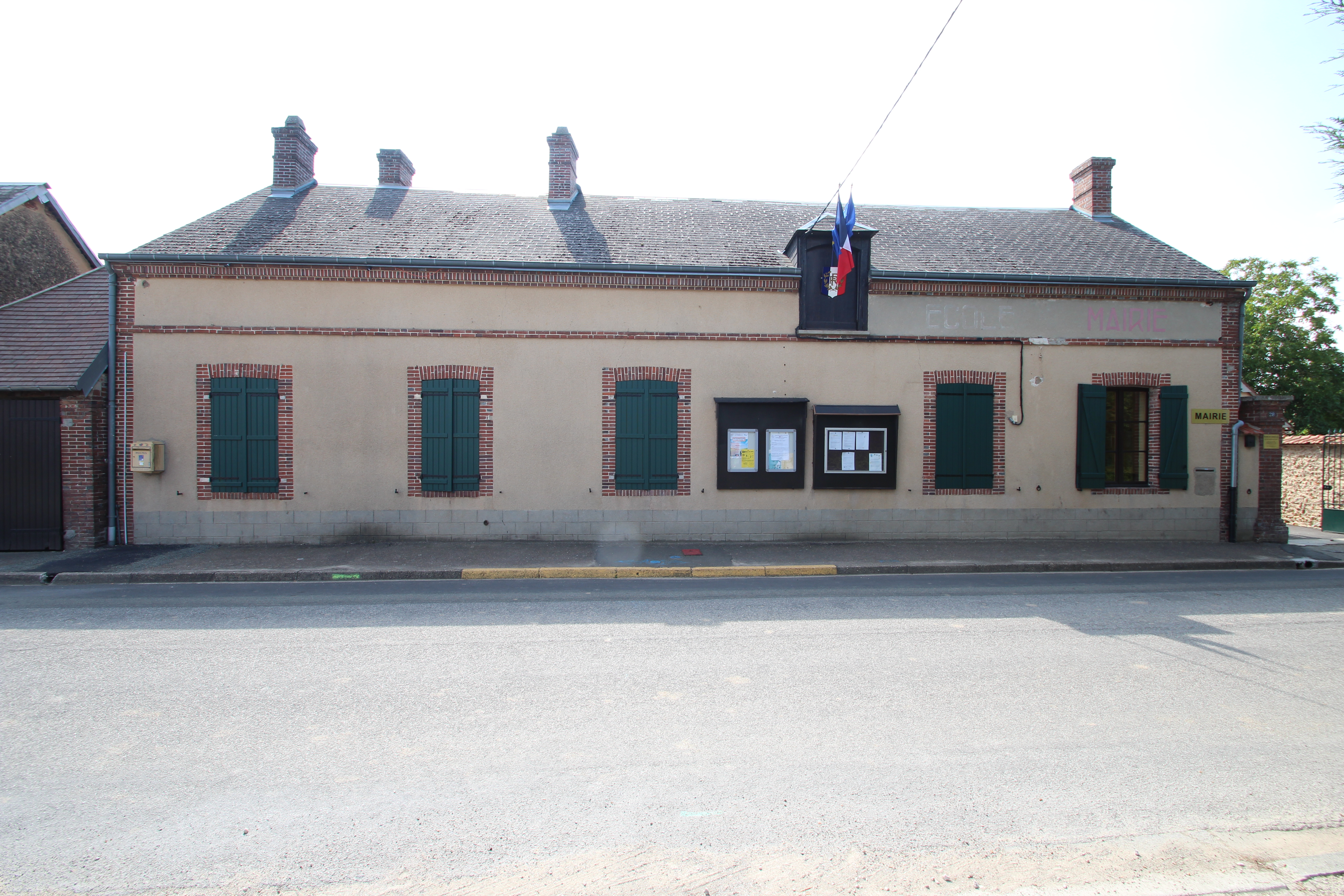
- The town hall in Croisilles
- Location of Croisilles
- Location within France Location within Centre-Val de Loire
- Coordinates: 48°41′23″N 1°30′18″E
- Country: France
- Region: Centre-Val de Loire
- Department: Eure-et-Loir
- Arrondissement: Dreux
- Canton: Dreux-2
- Intercommunality: Portes Euréliennes d'Île-de-France

Government
  - Mayor (2020–2026): Xavier-François Marie
- Area^{1}: 5.72 km^{2} (2.21 sq mi)
- Elevation: 125 m (410 ft)
- Highest elevation: 135 m (443 ft)
- Lowest elevation: 104 m (341 ft)
- Population (2023): 422
  - Density: 73.8/km^{2} (191/sq mi)
- Time zone: UTC+01:00 (CET)
  - Summer (DST): UTC+02:00 (CEST)
- INSEE/Postal code: 28118 /28210
- ^{1} French Land Register data, which excludes lakes, ponds, glaciers > 1 km^{2} (0.386 sq mi or 247 acres) and river estuaries.

Croisilles (French pronunciation: [kʁwazij]) is a commune in the Eure-et-Loir department in northern France.

== Population ==
Historical population
Year	Pop.	±% p.a.
1968	144	—
1975	162	+1.70%
1982	243	+5.96%
1990	271	+1.37%
1999	383	+3.92%
2007	449	+2.01%
2012	472	+1.00%
2017	437	−1.53%
2023	422	−0.58%
Source: INSEE

== See also ==
- Communes of the Eure-et-Loir department
