= Champhol =

- Commune
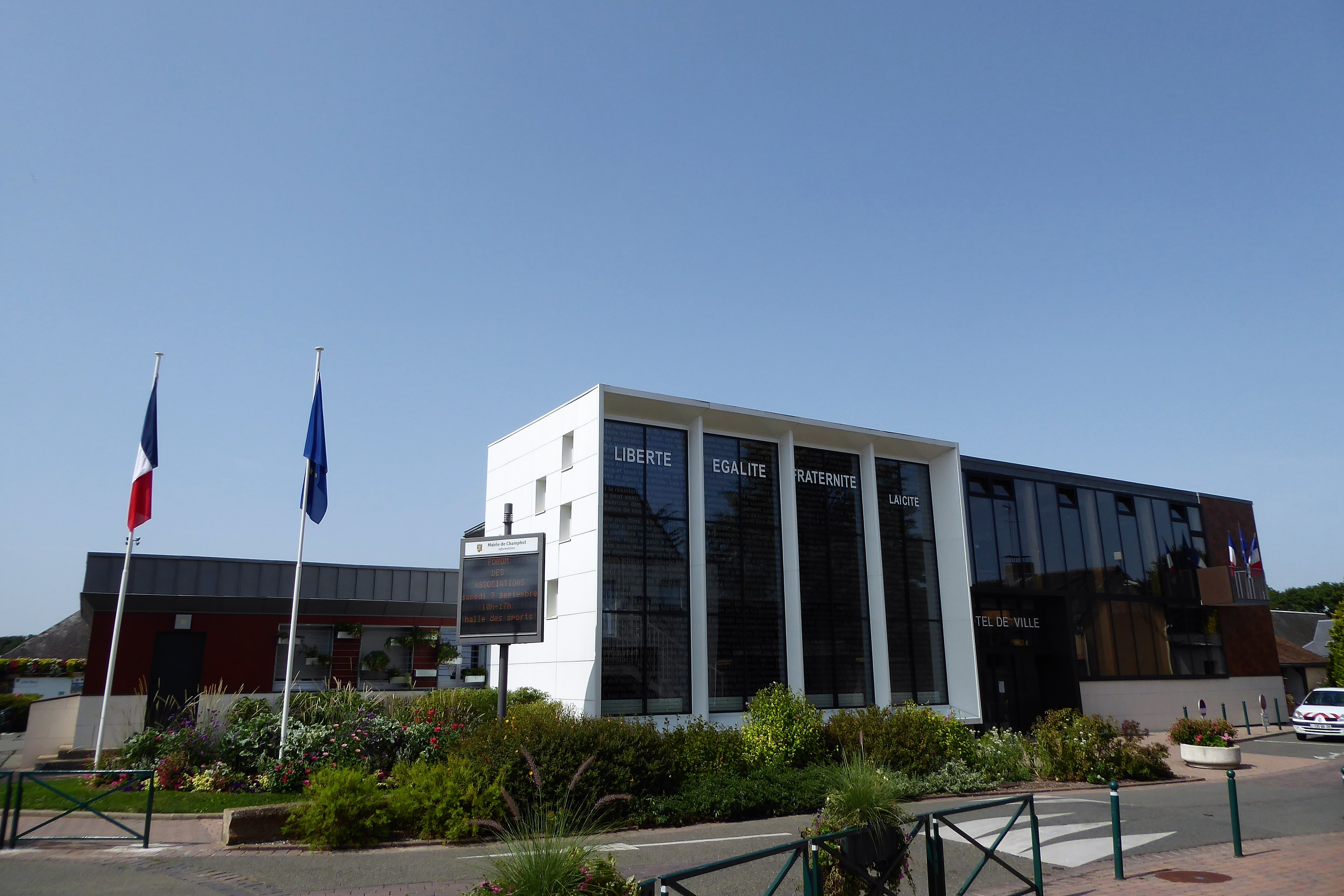
- The town hall in Champhol

- Coat of arms
- Location of Champhol
- Location within France Location within Centre-Val de Loire
- Coordinates: 48°28′10″N 1°30′11″E
- Country: France
- Region: Centre-Val de Loire
- Department: Eure-et-Loir
- Arrondissement: Chartres
- Canton: Chartres-1
- Intercommunality: CA Chartres Métropole

Government
  - Mayor (2020–2026): Étienne Rouault
- Area^{1}: 5.37 km^{2} (2.07 sq mi)
- Elevation: 155 m (509 ft)
- Highest elevation: 156 m (512 ft)
- Lowest elevation: 117 m (384 ft)
- Population (2023): 3,643
  - Density: 678/km^{2} (1,760/sq mi)
- Time zone: UTC+01:00 (CET)
  - Summer (DST): UTC+02:00 (CEST)
- INSEE/Postal code: 28070 /28300
- ^{1} French Land Register data, which excludes lakes, ponds, glaciers > 1 km^{2} (0.386 sq mi or 247 acres) and river estuaries.

Champhol (French pronunciation: [ʃɑ̃fɔl]) is a commune in the Eure-et-Loir department in northern France. The 18th-century French poet and playwright Gérard Du Doyer de Gastels (1732–1798) was born in this village.

== Population ==
Historical population
Year	Pop.	±% p.a.
1968	818	—
1975	1,063	+3.81%
1982	1,694	+6.88%
1990	2,235	+3.53%
1999	2,898	+2.93%
2007	3,423	+2.10%
2012	3,591	+0.96%
2017	3,656	+0.36%
2023	3,643	−0.06%
Source: INSEE

== See also ==
- Communes of the Eure-et-Loir department
