= Coltainville =

- Commune
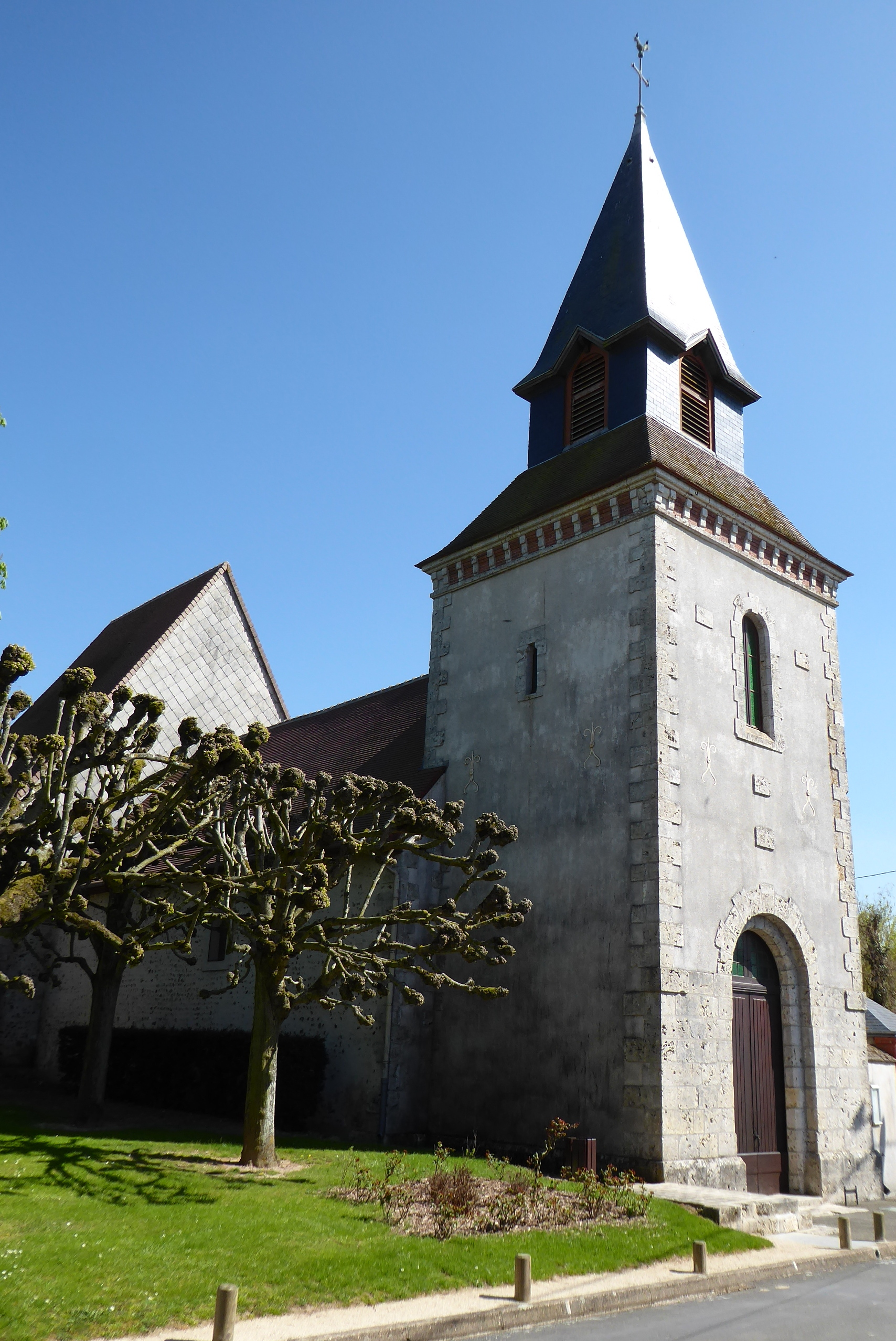
- The church in Coltainville
- Location of Coltainville
- Location within France Location within Centre-Val de Loire
- Coordinates: 48°29′14″N 1°35′16″E
- Country: France
- Region: Centre-Val de Loire
- Department: Eure-et-Loir
- Arrondissement: Chartres
- Canton: Chartres-1
- Intercommunality: CA Chartres Métropole

Government
  - Mayor (2020–2026): Philippe Galiotto
- Area^{1}: 18.02 km^{2} (6.96 sq mi)
- Elevation: 140 m (460 ft)
- Highest elevation: 158 m (518 ft)
- Lowest elevation: 127 m (417 ft)
- Population (2023): 915
  - Density: 50.8/km^{2} (132/sq mi)
- Time zone: UTC+01:00 (CET)
  - Summer (DST): UTC+02:00 (CEST)
- INSEE/Postal code: 28104 /28300
- ^{1} French Land Register data, which excludes lakes, ponds, glaciers > 1 km^{2} (0.386 sq mi or 247 acres) and river estuaries.

Coltainville (French pronunciation: [kɔltɛ̃vil]) is a commune in the Eure-et-Loir department in northern France.

== Population ==
Historical population
Year	Pop.	±% p.a.
1968	391	—
1975	378	−0.48%
1982	432	+1.93%
1990	737	+6.90%
1999	760	+0.34%
2007	835	+1.18%
2012	923	+2.02%
2017	884	−0.86%
2023	915	+0.58%
Source: INSEE

== See also ==
- Communes of the Eure-et-Loir department
