= Bréchamps =

- Commune
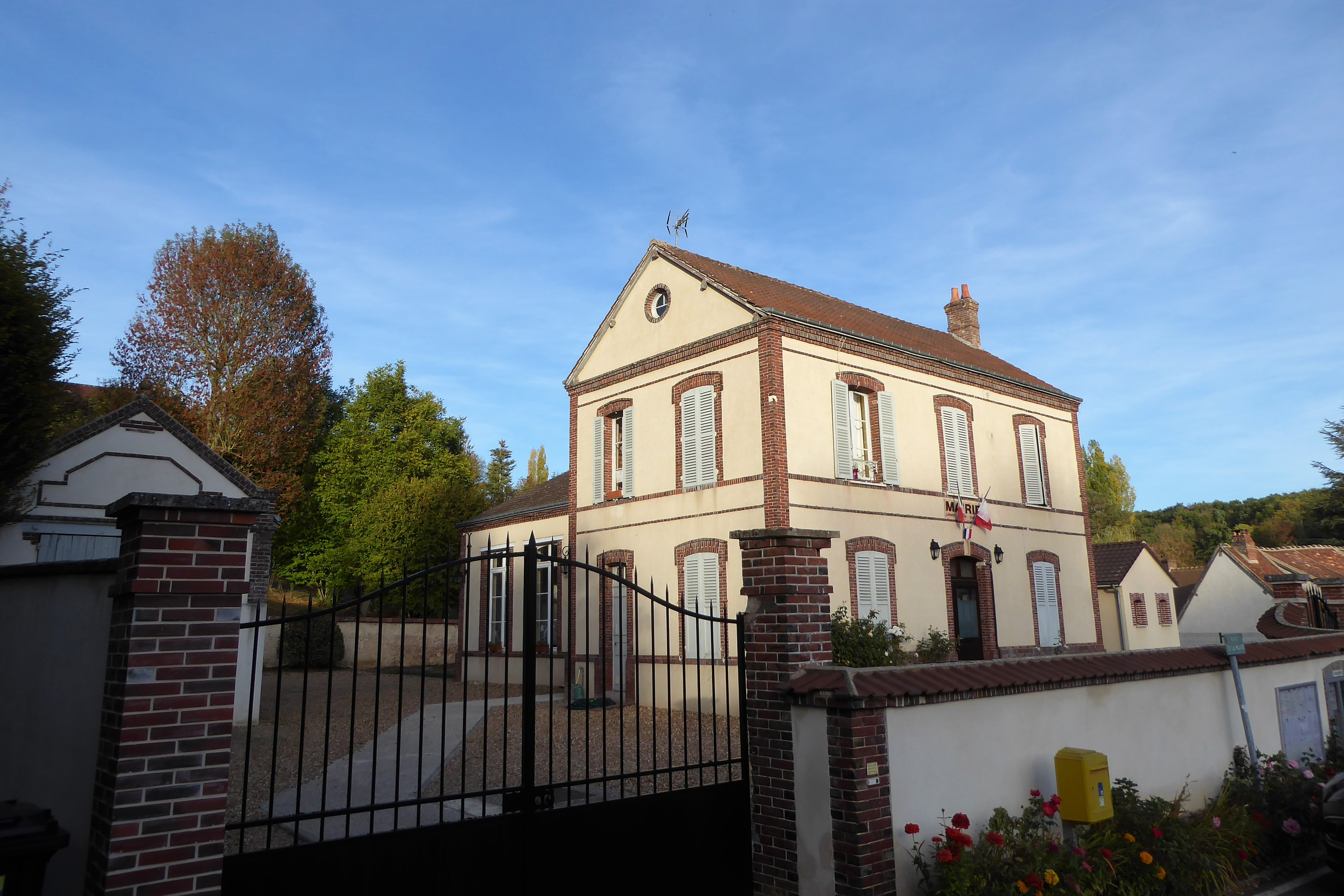
- The town hall in Bréchamps
- Location of Bréchamps
- Location within France Location within Centre-Val de Loire
- Coordinates: 48°40′22″N 1°31′20″E
- Country: France
- Region: Centre-Val de Loire
- Department: Eure-et-Loir
- Arrondissement: Dreux
- Canton: Dreux-2

Government
  - Mayor (2020–2026): Gérard Weymeels
- Area^{1}: 5.43 km^{2} (2.10 sq mi)
- Elevation: 105 m (344 ft)
- Highest elevation: 135 m (443 ft)
- Lowest elevation: 89 m (292 ft)
- Population (2023): 362
  - Density: 66.7/km^{2} (173/sq mi)
- Time zone: UTC+01:00 (CET)
  - Summer (DST): UTC+02:00 (CEST)
- INSEE/Postal code: 28058 /28210
- ^{1} French Land Register data, which excludes lakes, ponds, glaciers > 1 km^{2} (0.386 sq mi or 247 acres) and river estuaries.

Bréchamps (French pronunciation: [bʁeʃɑ̃]) is a commune in the Eure-et-Loir department in northern France.

== Population ==
Historical population
Year	Pop.	±% p.a.
1968	170	—
1975	181	+0.90%
1982	251	+4.78%
1990	270	+0.92%
1999	303	+1.29%
2007	327	+0.96%
2012	326	−0.06%
2017	344	+1.08%
2023	362	+0.85%
Source: INSEE

== See also ==
- Communes of the Eure-et-Loir department
