= Villemeux-sur-Eure =

- Commune
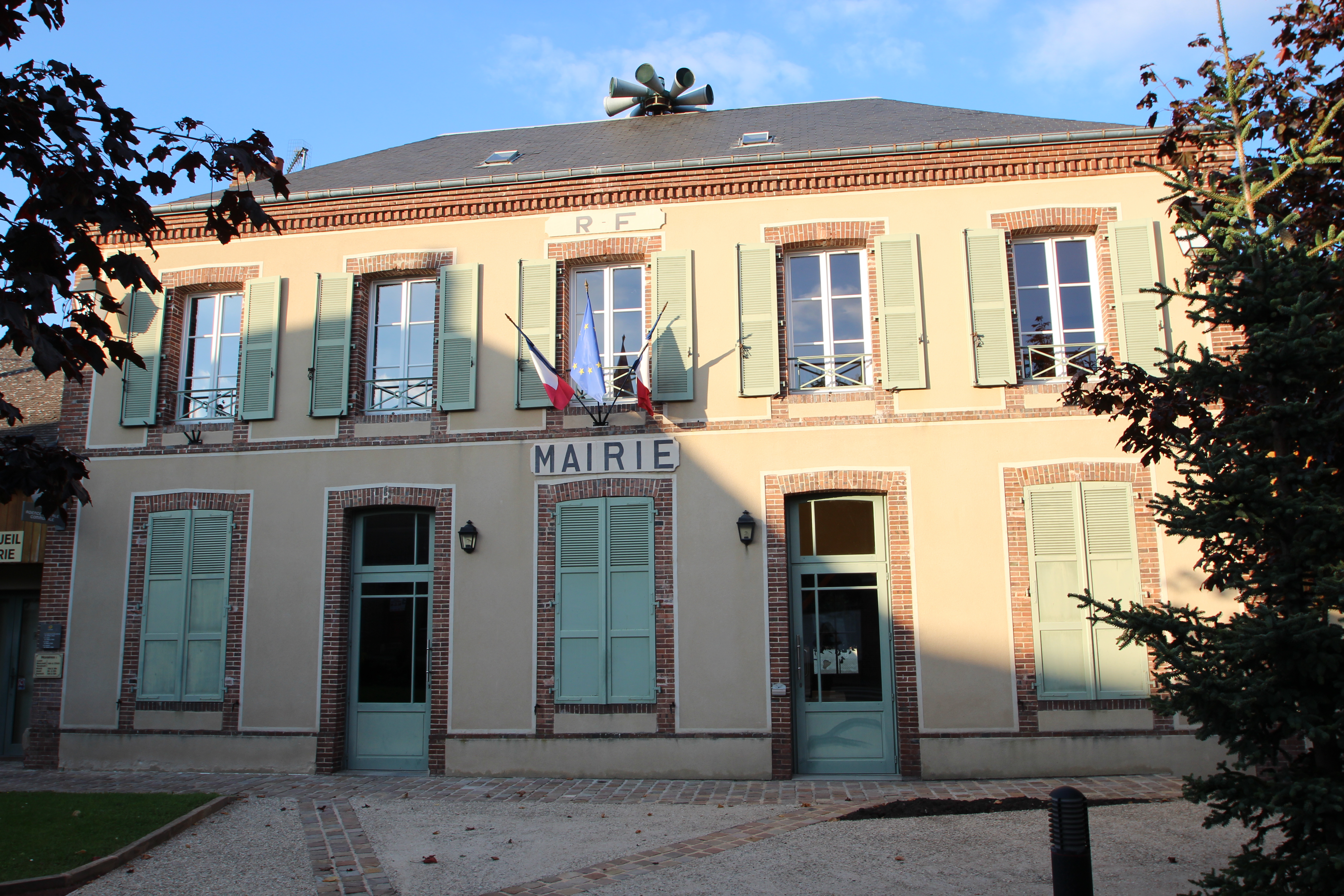
- The town hall in Villemeux-sur-Eure
- Location of Villemeux-sur-Eure
- Location within France Location within Centre-Val de Loire
- Coordinates: 48°40′27″N 1°27′46″E
- Country: France
- Region: Centre-Val de Loire
- Department: Eure-et-Loir
- Arrondissement: Dreux
- Canton: Dreux-2
- Intercommunality: CA Pays de Dreux

Government
  - Mayor (2020–2026): Daniel Rigourd
- Area^{1}: 18.59 km^{2} (7.18 sq mi)
- Elevation: 97 m (318 ft)
- Highest elevation: 141 m (463 ft)
- Lowest elevation: 80 m (260 ft)
- Population (2023): 1,780
  - Density: 95.8/km^{2} (248/sq mi)
- Time zone: UTC+01:00 (CET)
  - Summer (DST): UTC+02:00 (CEST)
- INSEE/Postal code: 28415 /28210
- ^{1} French Land Register data, which excludes lakes, ponds, glaciers > 1 km^{2} (0.386 sq mi or 247 acres) and river estuaries.

Villemeux-sur-Eure (French pronunciation: [vilmø syʁ œʁ], literally Villemeux on Eure) is a commune in the Eure-et-Loir department in northern France.

== Population ==
Historical population
Year	Pop.	±% p.a.
1968	954	—
1975	956	+0.03%
1982	1,119	+2.27%
1990	1,262	+1.51%
1999	1,386	+1.05%
2007	1,603	+1.83%
2012	1,623	+0.25%
2017	1,641	+0.22%
2023	1,780	+1.36%
Source: INSEE

== See also ==
- Communes of the Eure-et-Loir department
