= Fresnay-le-Gilmert =

- Commune
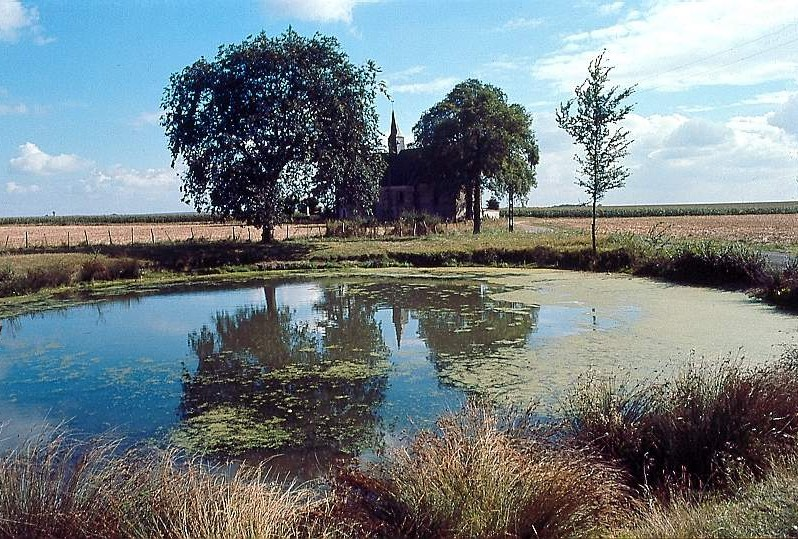
- The church and surroundings in Fresnay-le-Gilmert
- Location of Fresnay-le-Gilmert
- Location within France Location within Centre-Val de Loire
- Coordinates: 48°30′54″N 1°25′08″E
- Country: France
- Region: Centre-Val de Loire
- Department: Eure-et-Loir
- Arrondissement: Chartres
- Canton: Chartres-1
- Intercommunality: CA Chartres Métropole

Government
  - Mayor (2020–2026): Pierre-Marie Popot
- Area^{1}: 6.03 km^{2} (2.33 sq mi)
- Elevation: 180 m (590 ft)
- Highest elevation: 175 m (574 ft)
- Lowest elevation: 150 m (490 ft)
- Population (2023): 217
  - Density: 36.0/km^{2} (93.2/sq mi)
- Time zone: UTC+01:00 (CET)
  - Summer (DST): UTC+02:00 (CEST)
- INSEE/Postal code: 28163 /28300
- ^{1} French Land Register data, which excludes lakes, ponds, glaciers > 1 km^{2} (0.386 sq mi or 247 acres) and river estuaries.

Fresnay-le-Gilmert (French pronunciation: [fʁɛnɛ lə ʒilmɛʁ]) is a commune in the Eure-et-Loir department in northern France.

== Population ==
Historical population
Year	Pop.	±% p.a.
1968	133	—
1975	120	−1.46%
1982	148	+3.04%
1990	172	+1.90%
1999	221	+2.82%
2007	199	−1.30%
2012	206	+0.69%
2017	202	−0.39%
2023	217	+1.20%
Source: INSEE

== See also ==
- Communes of the Eure-et-Loir department
