= Charpont =

- Commune
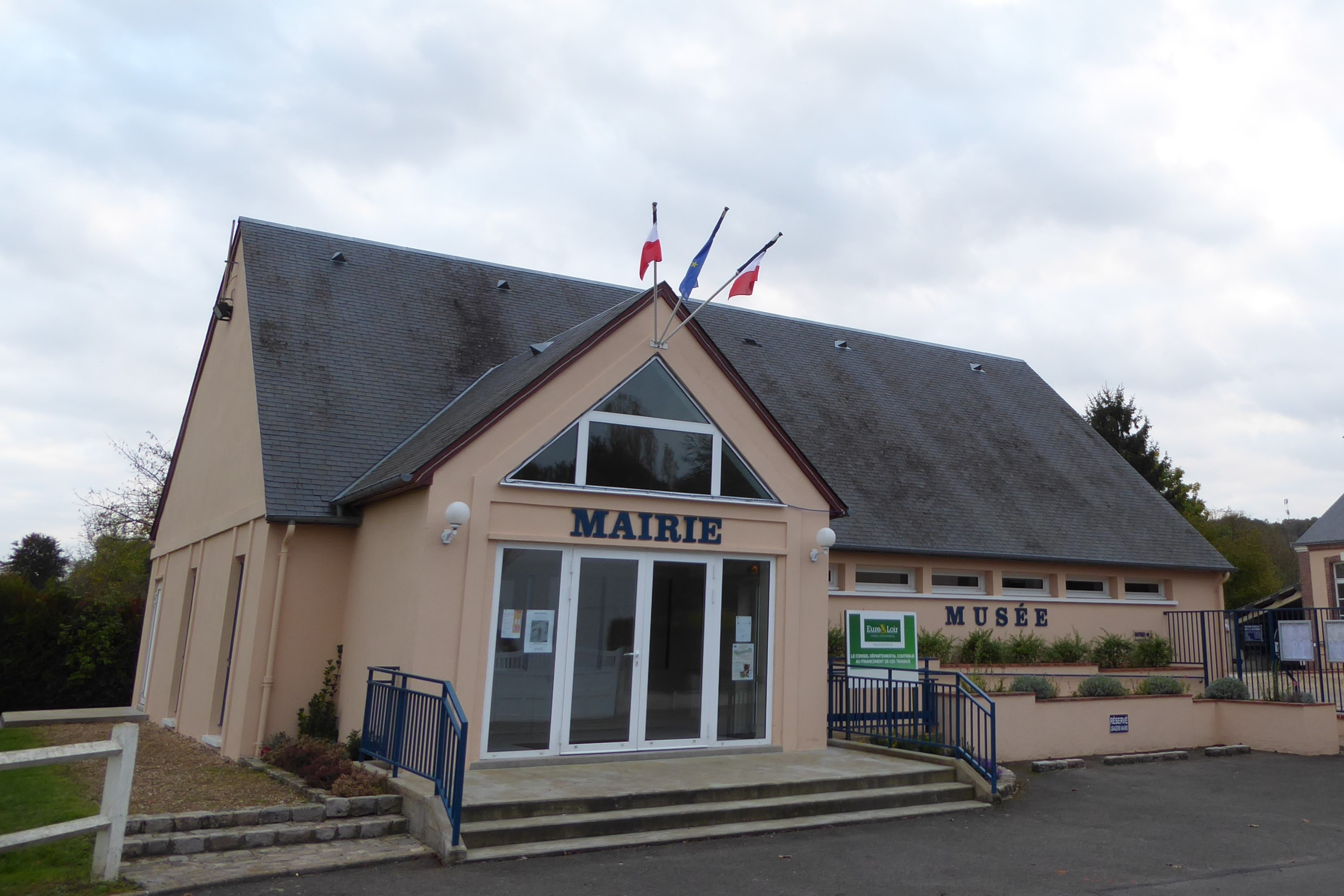
- The town hall in Charpont

- Coat of arms
- Location of Charpont
- Location within France Location within Centre-Val de Loire
- Coordinates: 48°42′04″N 1°26′25″E
- Country: France
- Region: Centre-Val de Loire
- Department: Eure-et-Loir
- Arrondissement: Dreux
- Canton: Dreux-2
- Intercommunality: CA Pays de Dreux

Government
  - Mayor (2020–2026): Dominique De Vos
- Area^{1}: 7.12 km^{2} (2.75 sq mi)
- Elevation: 90 m (300 ft)
- Highest elevation: 135 m (443 ft)
- Lowest elevation: 81 m (266 ft)
- Population (2023): 622
  - Density: 87.4/km^{2} (226/sq mi)
- Time zone: UTC+01:00 (CET)
  - Summer (DST): UTC+02:00 (CEST)
- INSEE/Postal code: 28082 /28500
- ^{1} French Land Register data, which excludes lakes, ponds, glaciers > 1 km^{2} (0.386 sq mi or 247 acres) and river estuaries.

Charpont (French pronunciation: [ʃaʁpɔ̃]) is a commune in the Eure-et-Loir department in northern France.

== Population ==
Historical population
Year	Pop.	±% p.a.
1968	221	—
1975	250	+1.78%
1982	323	+3.73%
1990	454	+4.35%
1999	491	+0.87%
2007	543	+1.27%
2012	547	+0.15%
2017	608	+2.14%
2023	622	+0.38%
Source: INSEE

== See also ==
- Communes of the Eure-et-Loir department
