= Gasville-Oisème =

- Commune
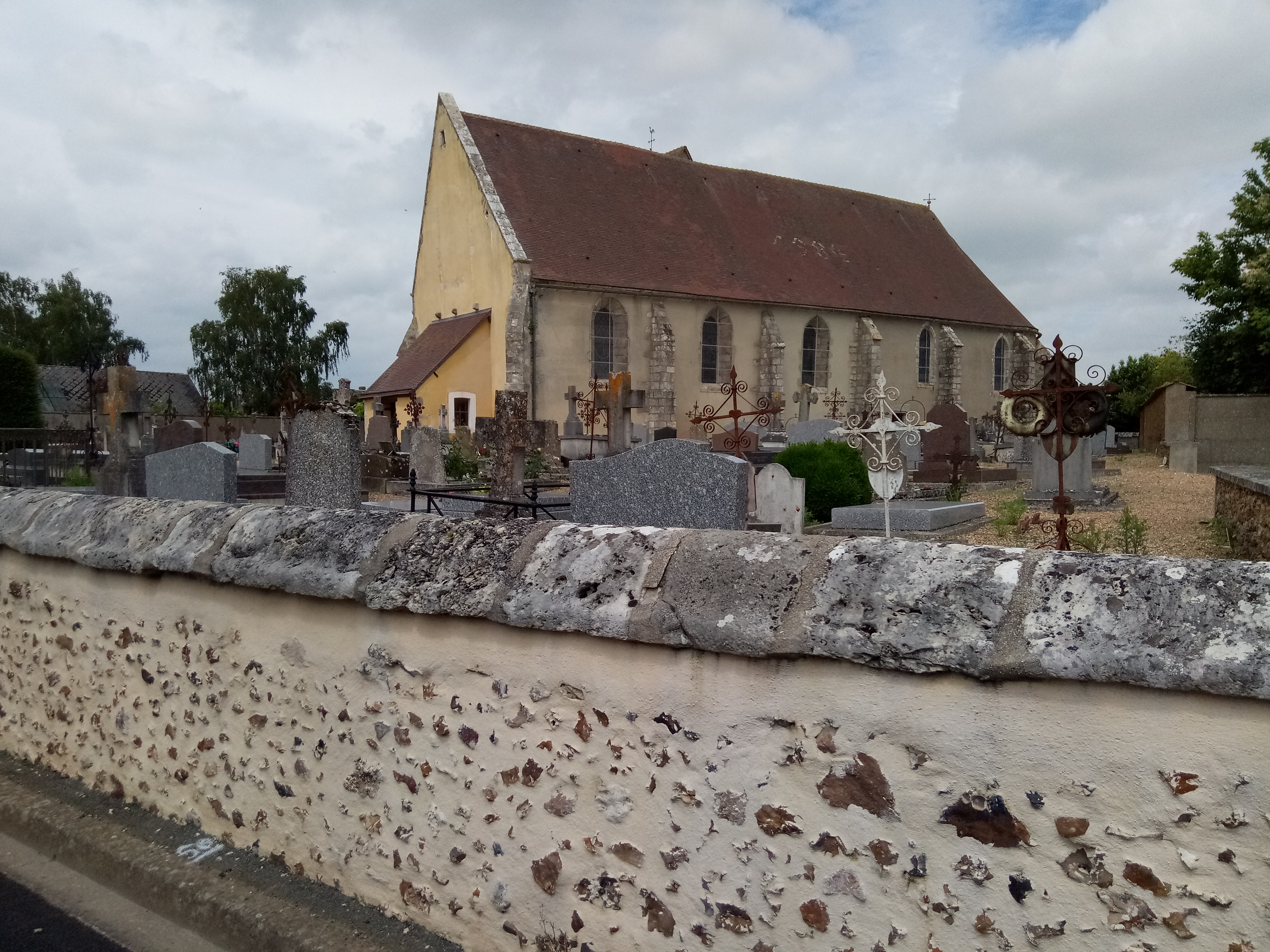
- The church in Gasville

- Coat of arms
- Location of Gasville-Oisème
- Location within France Location within Centre-Val de Loire
- Coordinates: 48°28′10″N 1°32′14″E
- Country: France
- Region: Centre-Val de Loire
- Department: Eure-et-Loir
- Arrondissement: Chartres
- Canton: Chartres-1
- Intercommunality: CA Chartres Métropole

Government
  - Mayor (2024–2026): Grégoire Bailleux
- Area^{1}: 9.09 km^{2} (3.51 sq mi)
- Elevation: 150 m (490 ft)
- Highest elevation: 151 m (495 ft)
- Lowest elevation: 117 m (384 ft)
- Population (2023): 1,467
  - Density: 161/km^{2} (418/sq mi)
- Time zone: UTC+01:00 (CET)
  - Summer (DST): UTC+02:00 (CEST)
- INSEE/Postal code: 28173 /28300
- ^{1} French Land Register data, which excludes lakes, ponds, glaciers > 1 km^{2} (0.386 sq mi or 247 acres) and river estuaries.

Gasville-Oisème (French pronunciation: [ɡavil wazɛm]) is a commune in the Eure-et-Loir department in northern France.

== Population ==
Historical population
Year	Pop.	±% p.a.
1968	606	—
1975	834	+4.67%
1982	875	+0.69%
1990	1,022	+1.96%
1999	1,136	+1.18%
2007	1,180	+0.48%
2012	1,326	+2.36%
2017	1,448	+1.78%
2023	1,467	+0.22%
Source: INSEE

== See also ==
- Communes of the Eure-et-Loir department
