= Ouerre =

- Commune
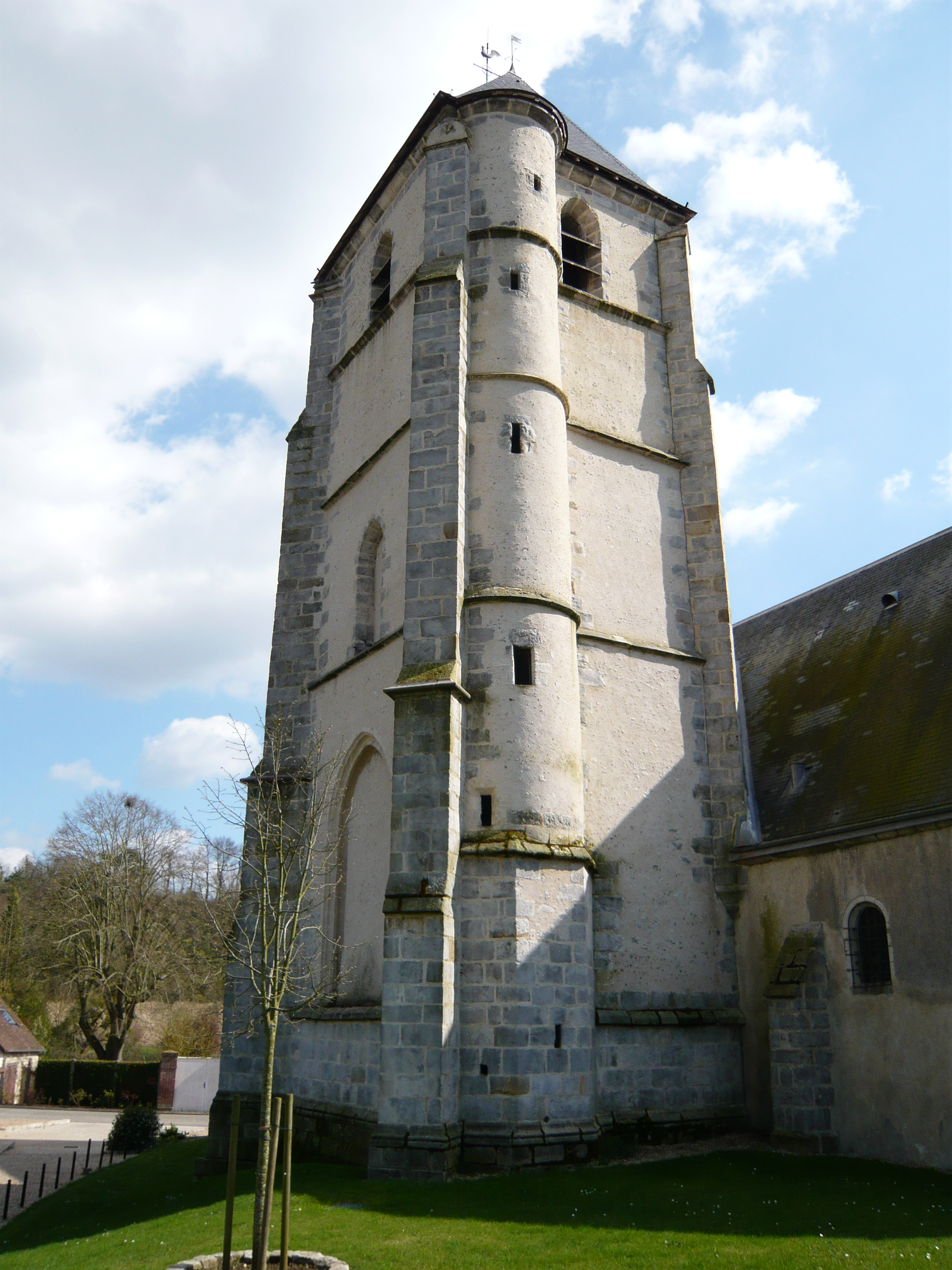
- The church in Ouerre
- Location of Ouerre
- Location within France Location within Centre-Val de Loire
- Coordinates: 48°42′06″N 1°28′01″E
- Country: France
- Region: Centre-Val de Loire
- Department: Eure-et-Loir
- Arrondissement: Dreux
- Canton: Dreux-2
- Intercommunality: CA Pays de Dreux

Government
  - Mayor (2023–2026): Clémentine Fisson
- Area^{1}: 12.73 km^{2} (4.92 sq mi)
- Elevation: 120 m (390 ft)
- Highest elevation: 136 m (446 ft)
- Lowest elevation: 86 m (282 ft)
- Population (2023): 785
  - Density: 61.7/km^{2} (160/sq mi)
- Time zone: UTC+01:00 (CET)
  - Summer (DST): UTC+02:00 (CEST)
- INSEE/Postal code: 28292 /28500
- ^{1} French Land Register data, which excludes lakes, ponds, glaciers > 1 km^{2} (0.386 sq mi or 247 acres) and river estuaries.

Ouerre (French pronunciation: [wɛʁ]) is a commune in the Eure-et-Loir department in northern France.

== Population ==
Historical population
Year	Pop.	±% p.a.
1968	234	—
1975	242	+0.48%
1982	385	+6.86%
1990	531	+4.10%
1999	589	+1.16%
2007	684	+1.89%
2012	673	−0.32%
2017	733	+1.72%
2023	785	+1.15%
Source: INSEE

== See also ==
- Communes of the Eure-et-Loir department
