= Mézières-en-Drouais =

- Commune
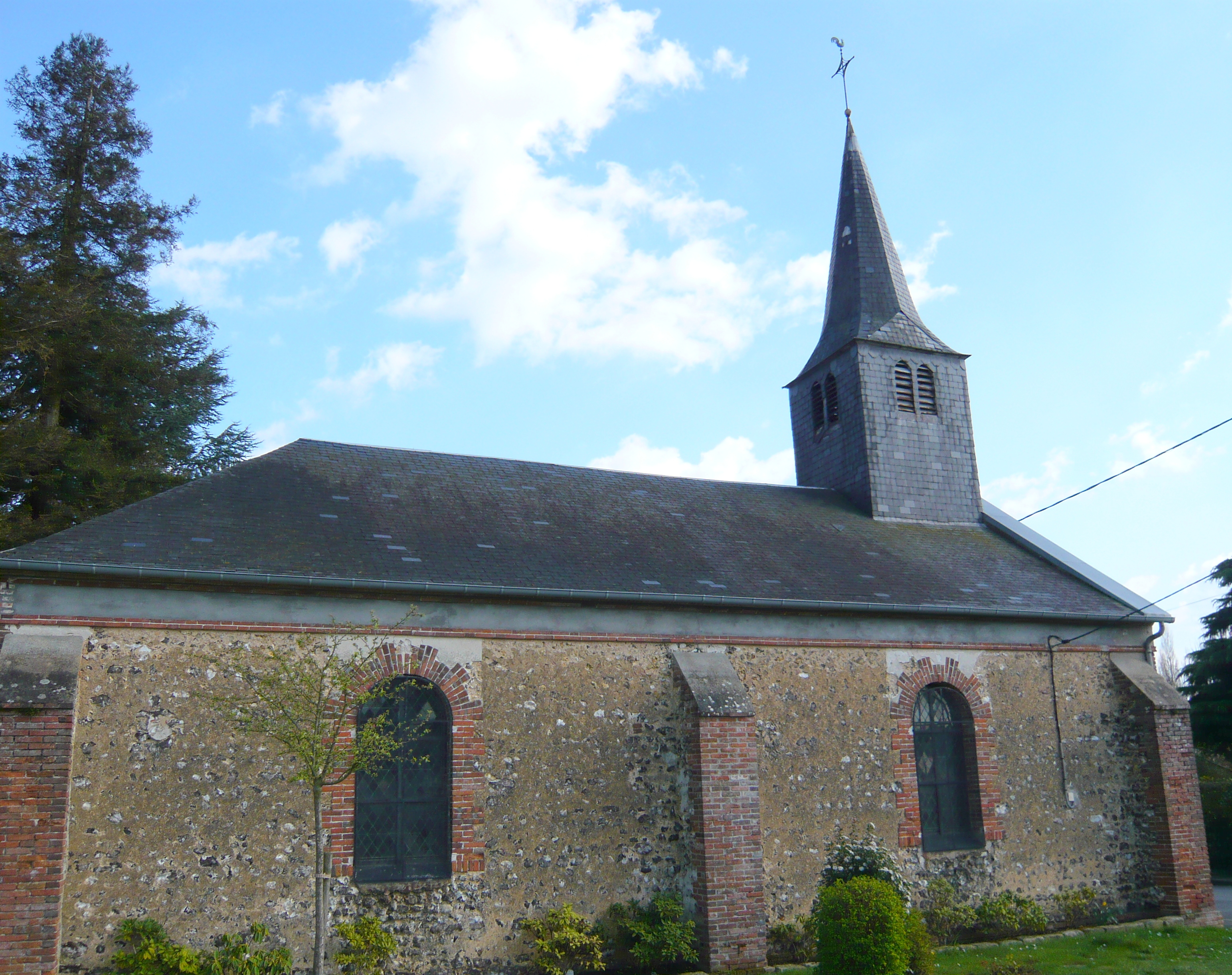
- The protestant church in Mézières-en-Drouais
- Location of Mézières-en-Drouais
- Location within France Location within Centre-Val de Loire
- Coordinates: 48°43′31″N 1°25′31″E
- Country: France
- Region: Centre-Val de Loire
- Department: Eure-et-Loir
- Arrondissement: Dreux
- Canton: Dreux-2
- Intercommunality: CA Pays de Dreux

Government
  - Mayor (2022–2026): Philippe Pommereau
- Area^{1}: 8.4 km^{2} (3.2 sq mi)
- Highest elevation: 134 m (440 ft)
- Lowest elevation: 81 m (266 ft)
- Population (2023): 1,059
  - Density: 130/km^{2} (330/sq mi)
- Time zone: UTC+01:00 (CET)
  - Summer (DST): UTC+02:00 (CEST)
- INSEE/Postal code: 28251 /28500
- ^{1} French Land Register data, which excludes lakes, ponds, glaciers > 1 km^{2} (0.386 sq mi or 247 acres) and river estuaries.

Mézières-en-Drouais is a commune in the Eure-et-Loir department and Centre-Val de Loire region of north-central France. It lies 32 km north of Chartres and some 70 km west of Paris.

== Population ==
Historical population
Year	Pop.	±% p.a.
1968	676	—
1975	681	+0.11%
1982	786	+2.07%
1990	1,018	+3.29%
1999	1,059	+0.44%
2007	1,062	+0.04%
2012	1,059	−0.06%
2017	1,073	+0.26%
2023	1,059	−0.22%
Source: INSEE

== See also ==
- Communes of the Eure-et-Loir department
