= Saint-Prest =

- Commune
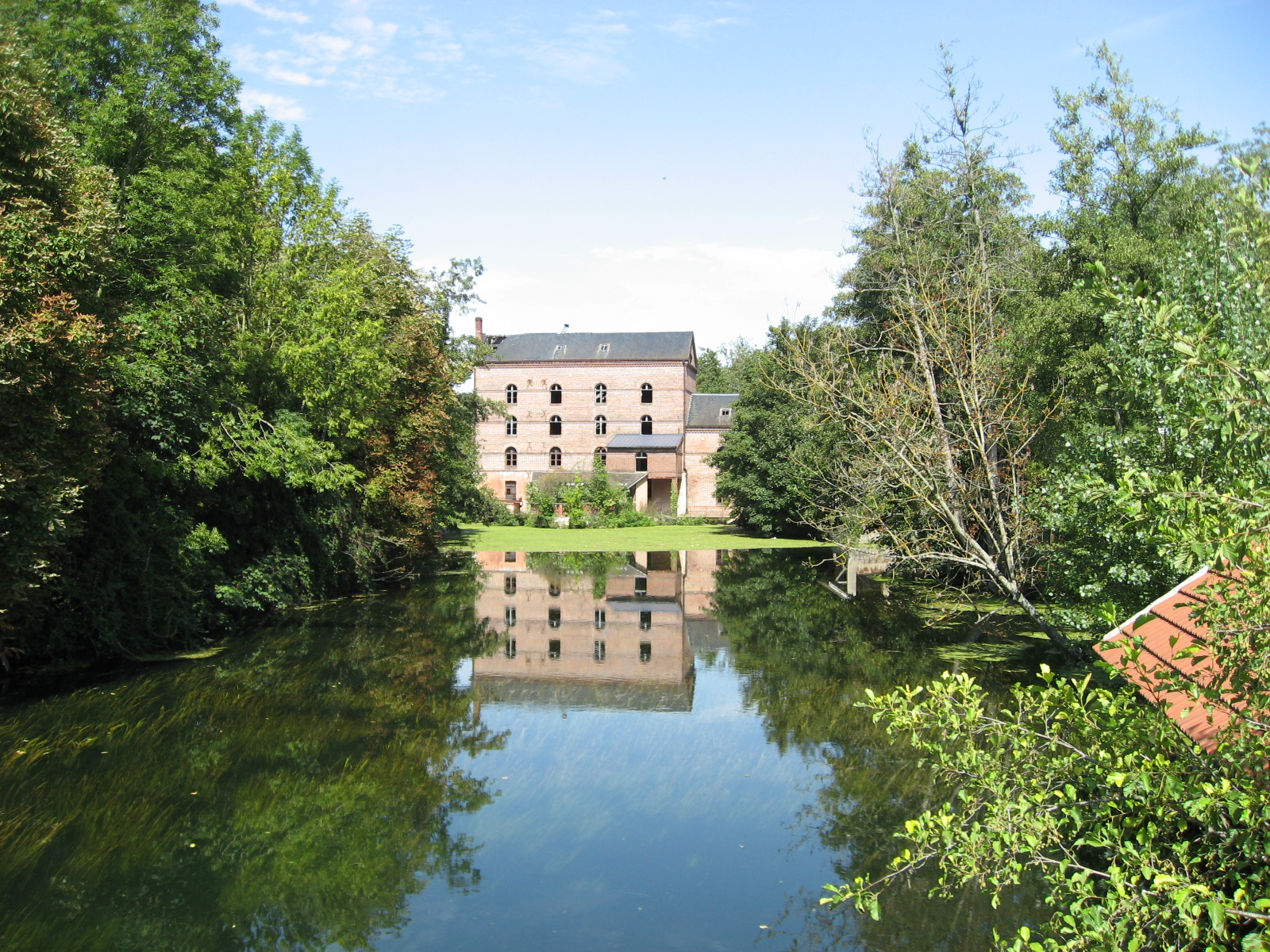
- Mill
- Location of Saint-Prest
- Location within France Location within Centre-Val de Loire
- Coordinates: 48°29′35″N 1°31′54″E
- Country: France
- Region: Centre-Val de Loire
- Department: Eure-et-Loir
- Arrondissement: Chartres
- Canton: Chartres-1
- Intercommunality: CA Chartres Métropole

Government
  - Mayor (2022–2026): Robert Baldo
- Area^{1}: 16.71 km^{2} (6.45 sq mi)
- Elevation: 124 m (407 ft)
- Highest elevation: 165 m (541 ft)
- Lowest elevation: 112 m (367 ft)
- Population (2023): 2,115
  - Density: 126.6/km^{2} (327.8/sq mi)
- Time zone: UTC+01:00 (CET)
  - Summer (DST): UTC+02:00 (CEST)
- INSEE/Postal code: 28358 /28300
- ^{1} French Land Register data, which excludes lakes, ponds, glaciers > 1 km^{2} (0.386 sq mi or 247 acres) and river estuaries.

Saint-Prest (French pronunciation: [sɛ̃ pʁɛ]) is a commune in the Eure-et-Loir department in northern France.

== Population ==
Historical population
Year	Pop.	±% p.a.
1968	1,118	—
1975	1,224	+1.30%
1982	1,483	+2.78%
1990	2,200	+5.05%
1999	2,260	+0.30%
2007	2,130	−0.74%
2012	2,018	−1.07%
2017	2,031	+0.13%
2023	2,115	+0.68%
Source: INSEE

== Notable people ==
- Madeleine Castaing (1894–1992), antiques dealer and interior designer, spent her childhood at Villa des Roses, 30 rue de la République.

== See also ==
- Communes of the Eure-et-Loir department
