= Jouy, Eure-et-Loir =

Jouy
- Commune
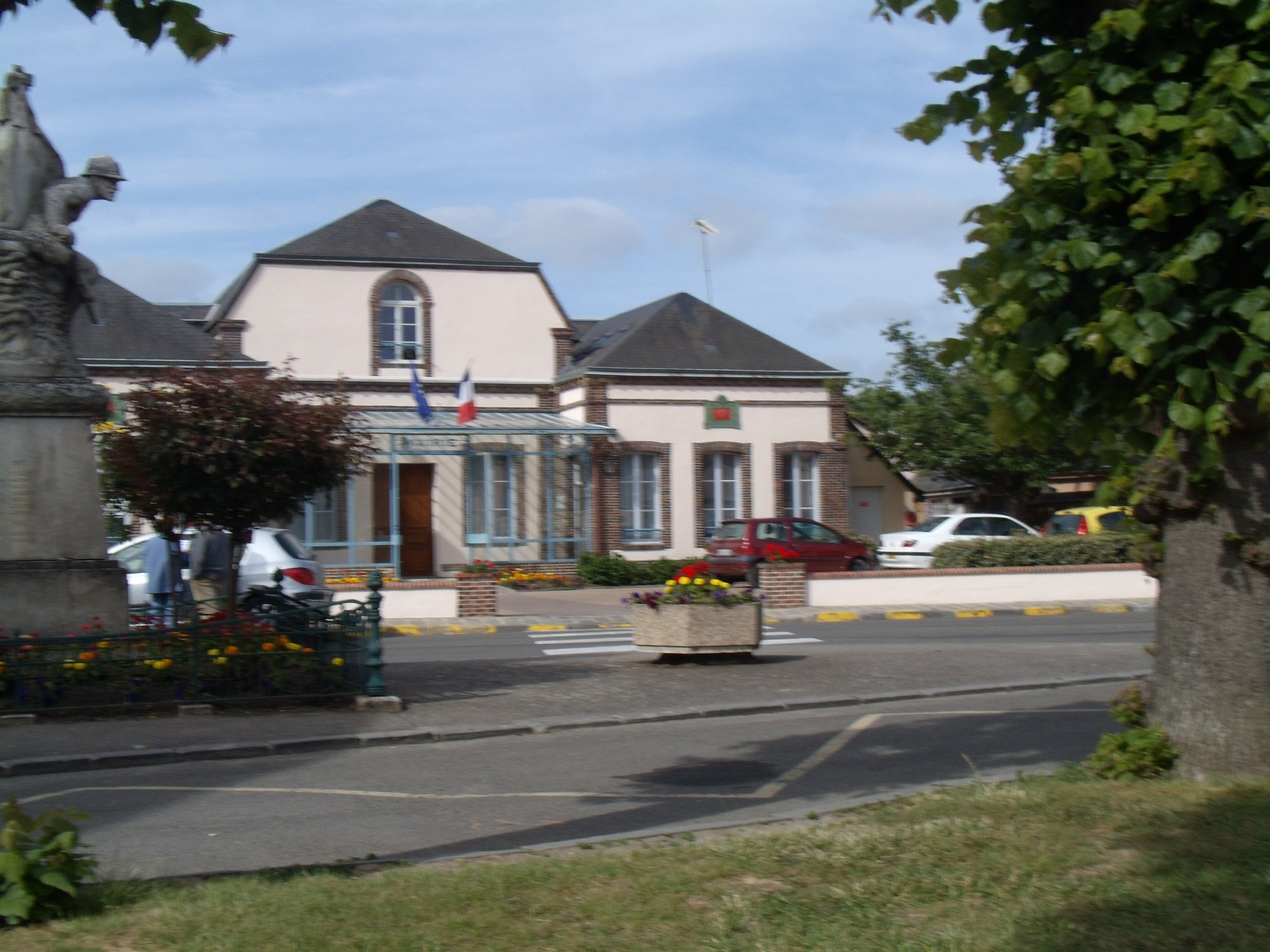
- Town hall
- Location of Jouy
- Location within France Location within Centre-Val de Loire
- Coordinates: 48°30′46″N 1°33′03″E
- Country: France
- Region: Centre-Val de Loire
- Department: Eure-et-Loir
- Arrondissement: Chartres
- Canton: Chartres-1
- Intercommunality: CA Chartres Métropole

Government
  - Mayor (2020–2026): Christian Paul-Loubière
- Area^{1}: 12.89 km^{2} (4.98 sq mi)
- Highest elevation: 161 m (528 ft)
- Lowest elevation: 106 m (348 ft)
- Population (2023): 1,988
  - Density: 154.2/km^{2} (399.4/sq mi)
- Time zone: UTC+01:00 (CET)
  - Summer (DST): UTC+02:00 (CEST)
- INSEE/Postal code: 28201 /28300
- ^{1} French Land Register data, which excludes lakes, ponds, glaciers > 1 km^{2} (0.386 sq mi or 247 acres) and river estuaries.

Jouy (French pronunciation: [ʒwi]) is a commune in the Eure-et-Loir department in northern France.

== Population ==
Historical population
| Year | Pop. | ±% p.a. |
|---|---|---|
| 1968 | 1,141 | — |
| 1975 | 1,286 | +1.72% |
| 1982 | 1,608 | +3.24% |
| 1990 | 1,755 | +1.10% |
| 1999 | 1,810 | +0.34% |
| 2007 | 1,884 | +0.50% |
| 2012 | 1,928 | +0.46% |
| 2017 | 1,939 | +0.11% |
| 2023 | 1,988 | +0.42% |
Source: INSEE

== See also ==
- Communes of the Eure-et-Loir department
