= Sainte-Gemme-Moronval =

- Commune
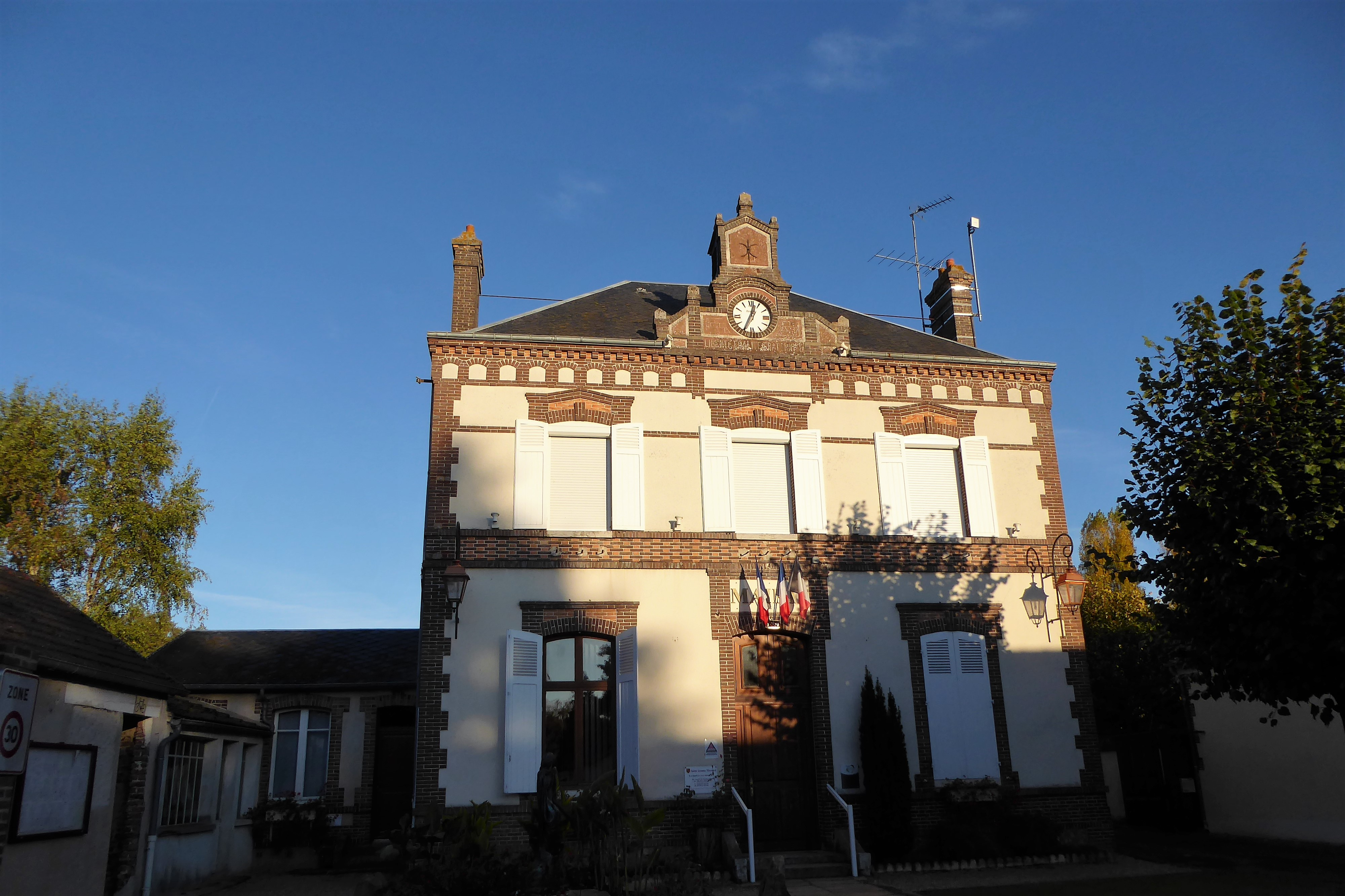
- The town hall in Sainte-Gemme-Moronval

- Coat of arms
- Location of Sainte-Gemme-Moronval
- Location within France Location within Centre-Val de Loire
- Coordinates: 48°44′18″N 1°24′56″E
- Country: France
- Region: Centre-Val de Loire
- Department: Eure-et-Loir
- Arrondissement: Dreux
- Canton: Dreux-2
- Intercommunality: CA Pays de Dreux

Government
  - Mayor (2020–2026): Françoise Borget
- Area^{1}: 5.46 km^{2} (2.11 sq mi)
- Highest elevation: 135 m (443 ft)
- Lowest elevation: 75 m (246 ft)
- Population (2023): 1,114
  - Density: 204/km^{2} (528/sq mi)
- Time zone: UTC+01:00 (CET)
  - Summer (DST): UTC+02:00 (CEST)
- INSEE/Postal code: 28332 /28500
- ^{1} French Land Register data, which excludes lakes, ponds, glaciers > 1 km^{2} (0.386 sq mi or 247 acres) and river estuaries.

Sainte-Gemme-Moronval (French pronunciation: [sɛ̃t ʒɛm mɔʁɔ̃val]) is a commune in the Eure-et-Loir department in northern France.

== Population ==
Historical population
| Year | Pop. | ±% p.a. |
|---|---|---|
| 1968 | 246 | — |
| 1975 | 365 | +5.80% |
| 1982 | 395 | +1.13% |
| 1990 | 613 | +5.65% |
| 1999 | 691 | +1.34% |
| 2007 | 871 | +2.94% |
| 2012 | 1,061 | +4.03% |
| 2017 | 1,093 | +0.60% |
| 2023 | 1,114 | +0.32% |
Source: INSEE

== See also ==
- Communes of the Eure-et-Loir department
