= Chaudon =

- Commune
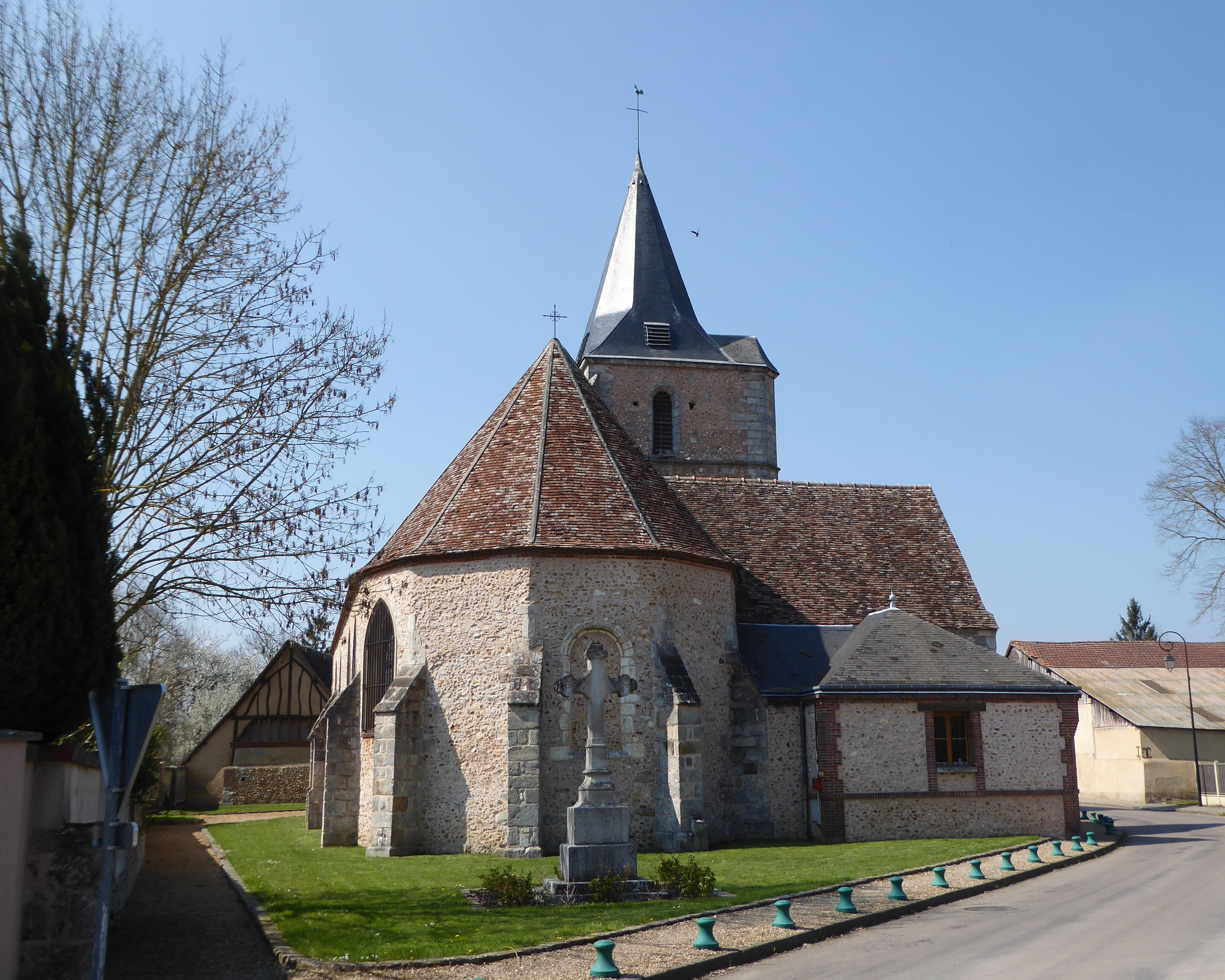
- The church in Chaudon

- Coat of arms
- Location of Chaudon
- Location within France Location within Centre-Val de Loire
- Coordinates: 48°39′45″N 1°29′51″E
- Country: France
- Region: Centre-Val de Loire
- Department: Eure-et-Loir
- Arrondissement: Dreux
- Canton: Dreux-2

Government
  - Mayor (2020–2026): Dominique Maillard
- Area^{1}: 11.34 km^{2} (4.38 sq mi)
- Elevation: 98 m (322 ft)
- Highest elevation: 140 m (460 ft)
- Lowest elevation: 86 m (282 ft)
- Population (2023): 1,688
  - Density: 148.9/km^{2} (385.5/sq mi)
- Time zone: UTC+01:00 (CET)
  - Summer (DST): UTC+02:00 (CEST)
- INSEE/Postal code: 28094 /28210
- ^{1} French Land Register data, which excludes lakes, ponds, glaciers > 1 km^{2} (0.386 sq mi or 247 acres) and river estuaries.

Chaudon (French pronunciation: [ʃodɔ̃]) is a commune in the Eure-et-Loir department in northern France.

== Population ==
Historical population
Year	Pop.	±% p.a.
1968	882	—
1975	873	−0.15%
1982	1,009	+2.09%
1990	1,364	+3.84%
1999	1,411	+0.38%
2007	1,566	+1.31%
2012	1,649	+1.04%
2017	1,685	+0.43%
2023	1,688	+0.03%
Source: INSEE

== See also ==
- Communes of the Eure-et-Loir department
