= Gérard Du Doyer de Gastels =

French poet and playwright

- Born: 29 April 1732; Champhol, France
- Died: 10 April 1798 (aged 65); Paris, France
- Occupations: Poet; Playwright

Gérard Du Doyer de Gastels (29 April 1732 – 10 April 1798) was an 18th-century French poet and playwright.

== Biography ==
The son of a councilor by the Accounting Chamber and brother of an adviser to Parlement, the Marquis Du Doyer served for fifteen years in the regiment of Aunis which he left to become an oratorian. He remained seven years at the Oratory and became a Jansenist and a zealous convulsionnaire then left the community with feelings that made him consider favorably by the Encyclopédistes. He devoted himself to the study of science and neglected none, since he had studied theology at the Oratory, to chemistry and mathematics. Frequent readings he made of Bayle completed his drive to skepticism and he eventually believed nothing without mathematical evidence.

He was only twenty-two when Claude Joseph Dorat had the opportunity to introduce him to mademoiselle Deligny, young actress of the Theatre français. Du Doyer doted on her, and addressed her an epistle in verse, which was printed in the 1766 edition of the Almanach des Muses. Having married her, he composed some plays and lived to the age of 65, still in love with her and always happy, although other records indicate that they did not live in such close intimacy.

Dudoyer had several plays presented at the Comédie-Française:

- Laurette, two-act comedy in free verse, played 14 September 1768;
- le Vindicatif, drama in 5 acts and in free verse, 1774, in-8°, which had several presentations;
- Adélaïde ou l’Antipathie contre l’amour, comedy in 2 acts and in ten syllables verse, 1780, in-8°;
- Several of his poems were inserted in the Almanach des Muses; he left several manuscripts, among which a tragedy whose title and subject are unknown.

== Sources ==
- Campardon, Émile (1879). Les Comédiens du roi de la Troupe française pendant les deux derniers siècles (in French). Paris: Honoré Champion. p. 222. "Gérard Du Doyer de Gastel."
- Michaud, Joseph-François (1856). Biographie universelle ancienne et moderne (in French). Vol. 11. Paris: Madame C. Desplaces. p. 426.
- "Unknown title". L'Intermédiaire des chercheurs et curieux (in French). Vol. 36. Paris. 1897. p. 749.
