= Écluzelles =

- Commune
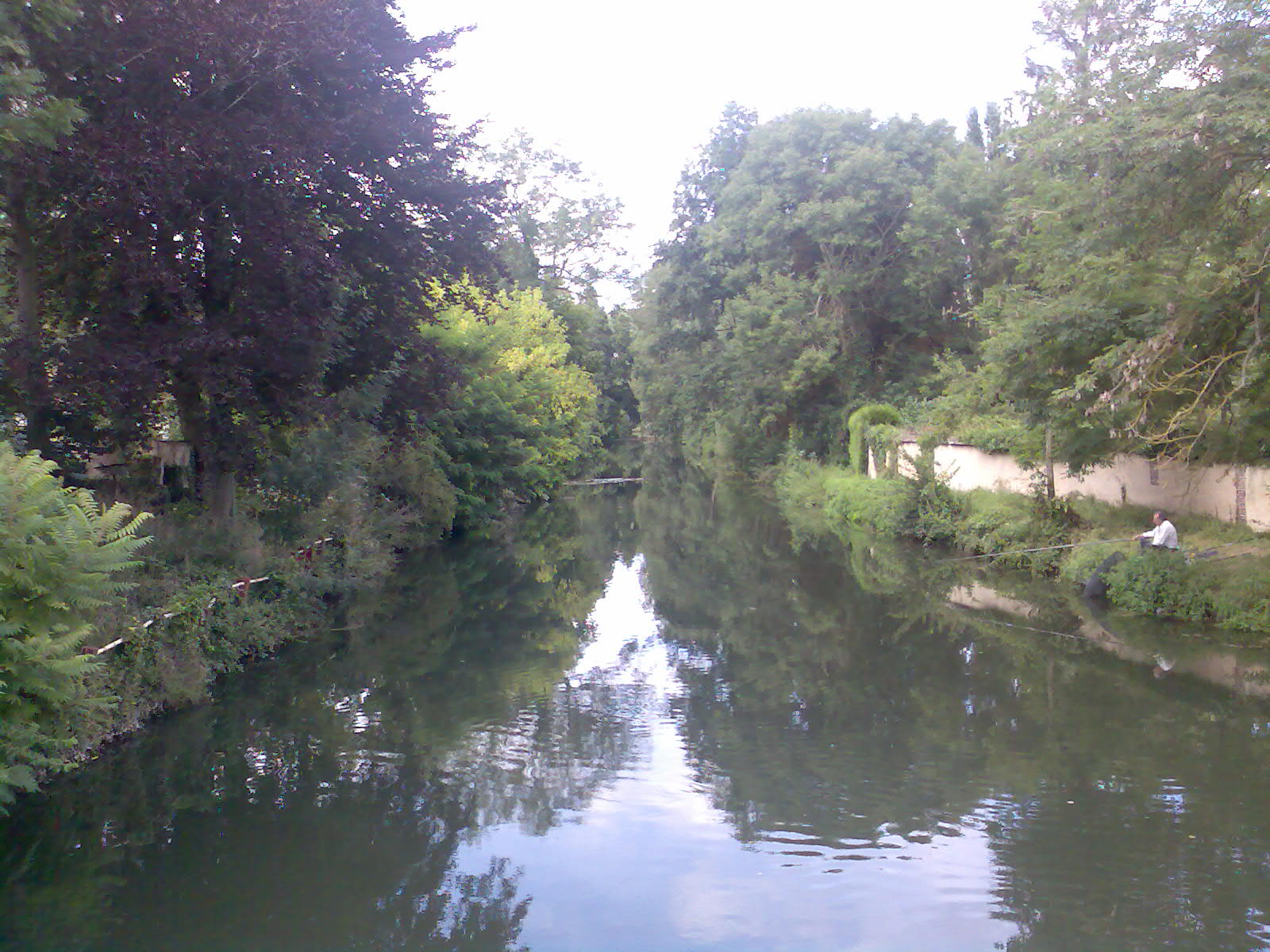
- The Eure River

- Coat of arms
- Location of Écluzelles
- Location within France Location within Centre-Val de Loire
- Coordinates: 48°42′36″N 1°25′31″E
- Country: France
- Region: Centre-Val de Loire
- Department: Eure-et-Loir
- Arrondissement: Dreux
- Canton: Dreux-2
- Intercommunality: CA Pays de Dreux

Government
  - Mayor (2020–2026): Christine Renaux-Maréchal
- Area^{1}: 3.22 km^{2} (1.24 sq mi)
- Elevation: 83 m (272 ft)
- Highest elevation: 135 m (443 ft)
- Lowest elevation: 80 m (260 ft)
- Population (2023): 162
  - Density: 50.3/km^{2} (130/sq mi)
- Time zone: UTC+01:00 (CET)
  - Summer (DST): UTC+02:00 (CEST)
- INSEE/Postal code: 28136 /28500
- ^{1} French Land Register data, which excludes lakes, ponds, glaciers > 1 km^{2} (0.386 sq mi or 247 acres) and river estuaries.

Écluzelles (French pronunciation: [eklyzɛl]) is a commune in the Eure-et-Loir department in north central France.

== Population ==
Historical population
Year	Pop.	±% p.a.
1968	85	—
1975	113	+4.15%
1982	135	+2.57%
1990	166	+2.62%
1999	168	+0.13%
2007	155	−1.00%
2012	172	+2.10%
2017	166	−0.71%
2023	162	−0.41%
Source: INSEE

== See also ==
- Communes of the Eure-et-Loir department
