= Le Boullay-Mivoye =

- Commune
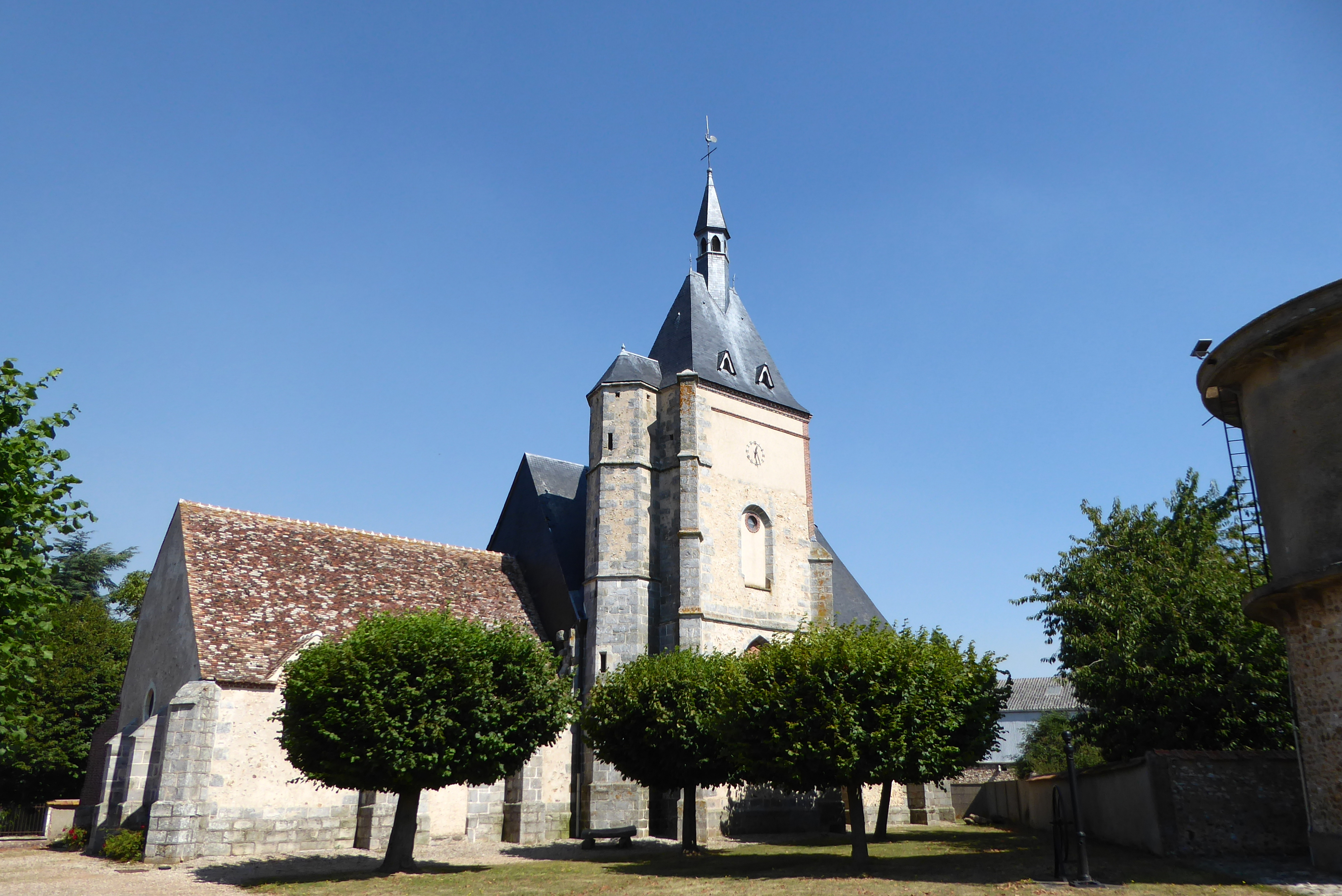
- The church in Le Boullay-Mivoye
- Location of Le Boullay-Mivoye
- Location within France Location within Centre-Val de Loire
- Coordinates: 48°38′53″N 1°24′20″E
- Country: France
- Region: Centre-Val de Loire
- Department: Eure-et-Loir
- Arrondissement: Dreux
- Canton: Dreux-2
- Intercommunality: CA Pays de Dreux

Government
  - Mayor (2020–2026): Stéphane Huet
- Area^{1}: 10.92 km^{2} (4.22 sq mi)
- Elevation: 150 m (490 ft)
- Highest elevation: 162 m (531 ft)
- Lowest elevation: 115 m (377 ft)
- Population (2023): 526
  - Density: 48.2/km^{2} (125/sq mi)
- Time zone: UTC+01:00 (CET)
  - Summer (DST): UTC+02:00 (CEST)
- INSEE/Postal code: 28054 /28210
- ^{1} French Land Register data, which excludes lakes, ponds, glaciers > 1 km^{2} (0.386 sq mi or 247 acres) and river estuaries.

Le Boullay-Mivoye (French pronunciation: [lə bulɛ mivwa]) is a commune in the Eure-et-Loir department in northern France.

== Geography ==
The village is positioned on flat land along the RN154 between Dreux and Chartres, a little closer to the former than to the latter.

== History ==
A standing stone testifies to the existence of human settlement in prehistoric times, and the remains of various farms from the Roman and Gallo-Roman periods have also been found in the vicinity.

During the French Revolution there was across France a resurgence of enthusiasm for the Gallo-Roman period, and Le Boullay-Mivoye was for a time called Le Boullay-Brutus.

== Population ==
Historical population
Year	Pop.	±% p.a.
1968	233	—
1975	266	+1.91%
1982	347	+3.87%
1990	353	+0.21%
1999	344	−0.29%
2007	416	+2.40%
2012	446	+1.40%
2017	486	+1.73%
2023	526	+1.33%
Source: INSEE

== See also ==
- Communes of the Eure-et-Loir department
