= Poisvilliers =

- Commune
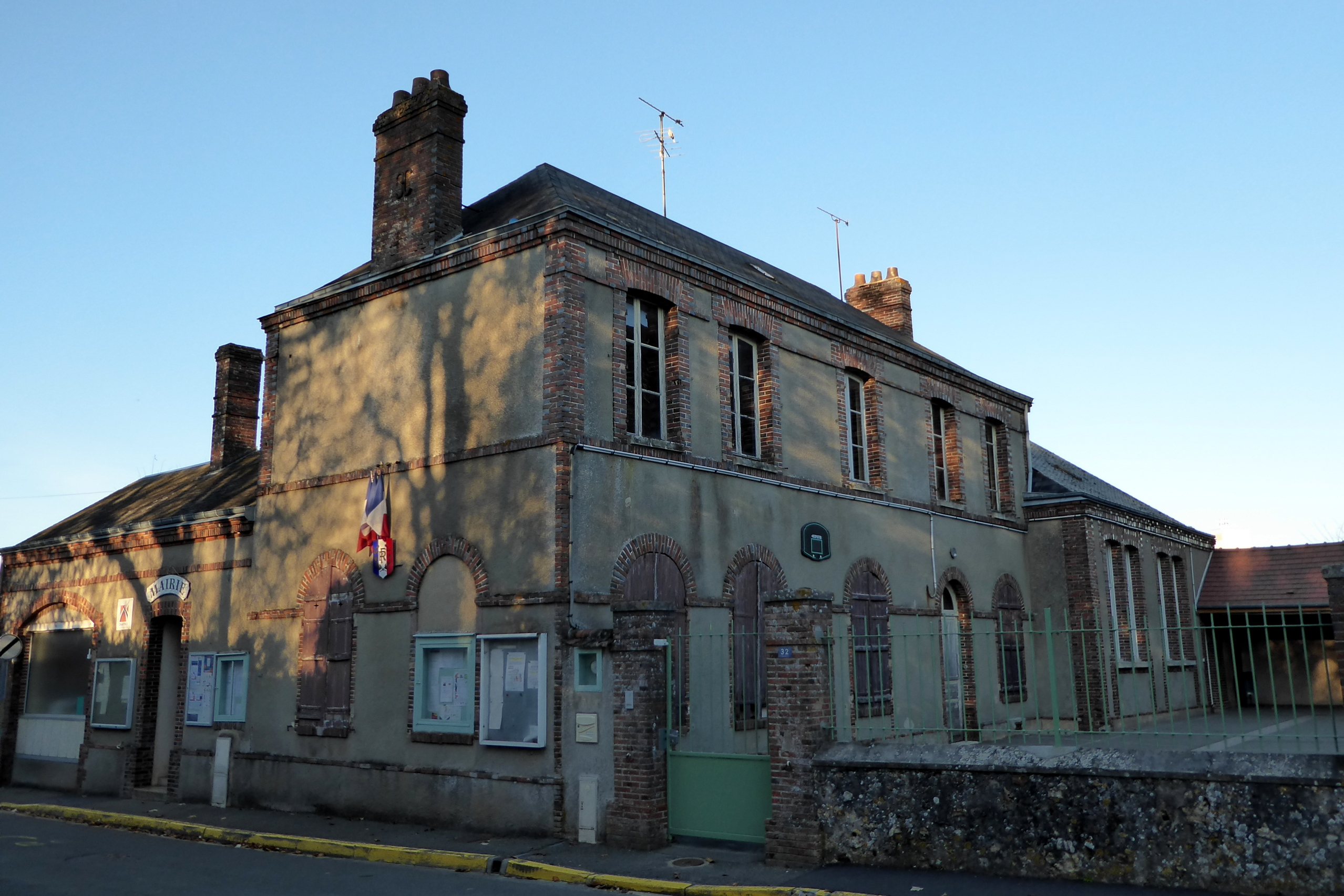
- The town hall and school in Poisvilliers

- Coat of arms
- Location of Poisvilliers
- Location within France Location within Centre-Val de Loire
- Coordinates: 48°30′33″N 1°28′10″E
- Country: France
- Region: Centre-Val de Loire
- Department: Eure-et-Loir
- Arrondissement: Chartres
- Canton: Chartres-1
- Intercommunality: CA Chartres Métropole

Government
  - Mayor (2020–2026): Marie Bourgeot
- Area^{1}: 10.57 km^{2} (4.08 sq mi)
- Elevation: 162 m (531 ft)
- Highest elevation: 171 m (561 ft)
- Lowest elevation: 145 m (476 ft)
- Population (2023): 445
  - Density: 42.1/km^{2} (109/sq mi)
- Time zone: UTC+01:00 (CET)
  - Summer (DST): UTC+02:00 (CEST)
- INSEE/Postal code: 28301 /28300
- ^{1} French Land Register data, which excludes lakes, ponds, glaciers > 1 km^{2} (0.386 sq mi or 247 acres) and river estuaries.

Poisvilliers (French pronunciation: [pwavilje]) is a commune in the Eure-et-Loir department in northern France.

== Population ==
Historical population
Year	Pop.	±% p.a.
1968	168	—
1975	203	+2.74%
1982	228	+1.67%
1990	234	+0.33%
1999	260	+1.18%
2007	352	+3.86%
2012	426	+3.89%
2017	443	+0.79%
2023	445	+0.08%
Source: INSEE

== See also ==
- Communes of the Eure-et-Loir department
