= Berchères-Saint-Germain =

- Commune
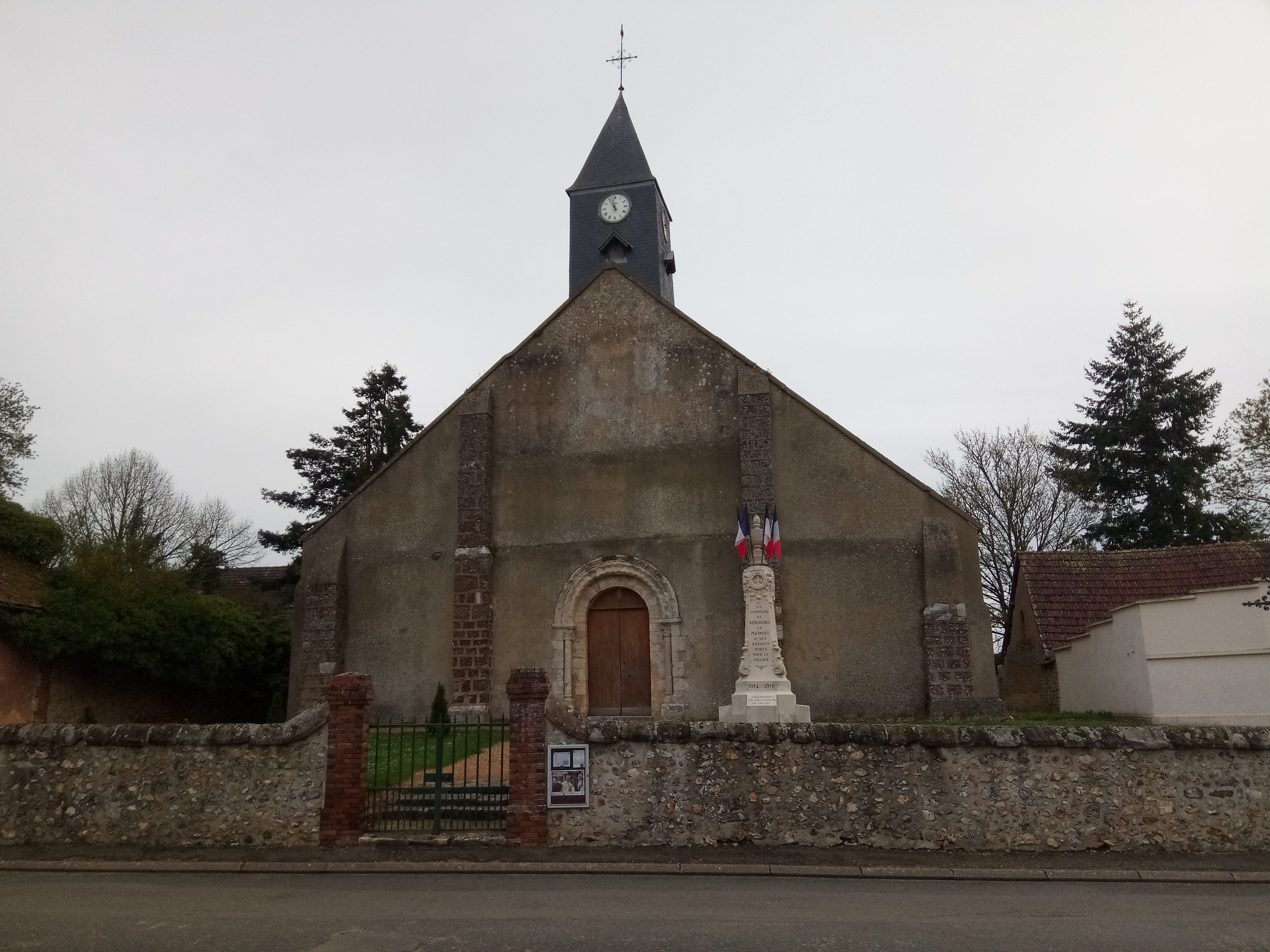
- The church in Berchères

- Coat of arms
- Location of Berchères-Saint-Germain
- Location within France Location within Centre-Val de Loire
- Coordinates: 48°32′13″N 1°28′48″E
- Country: France
- Region: Centre-Val de Loire
- Department: Eure-et-Loir
- Arrondissement: Chartres
- Canton: Chartres-1
- Intercommunality: CA Chartres Métropole

Government
  - Mayor (2020–2026): Dominique Blois
- Area^{1}: 27.67 km^{2} (10.68 sq mi)
- Elevation: 174 m (571 ft)
- Highest elevation: 195 m (640 ft)
- Lowest elevation: 137 m (449 ft)
- Population (2023): 905
  - Density: 32.7/km^{2} (84.7/sq mi)
- Time zone: UTC+01:00 (CET)
  - Summer (DST): UTC+02:00 (CEST)
- INSEE/Postal code: 28034 /28300
- ^{1} French Land Register data, which excludes lakes, ponds, glaciers > 1 km^{2} (0.386 sq mi or 247 acres) and river estuaries.

Berchères-Saint-Germain (French pronunciation: [bɛʁʃɛʁ sɛ̃ ʒɛʁmɛ̃]) is a commune in the Eure-et-Loir department in northern France.

== Population ==
Historical population
Year	Pop.	±% p.a.
1968	325	—
1975	367	+1.75%
1982	446	+2.82%
1990	594	+3.65%
1999	682	+1.55%
2007	784	+1.76%
2012	766	−0.46%
2017	845	+1.98%
2023	905	+1.15%
Source: INSEE

== See also ==
- Communes of the Eure-et-Loir department
