= Briconville =

- Commune
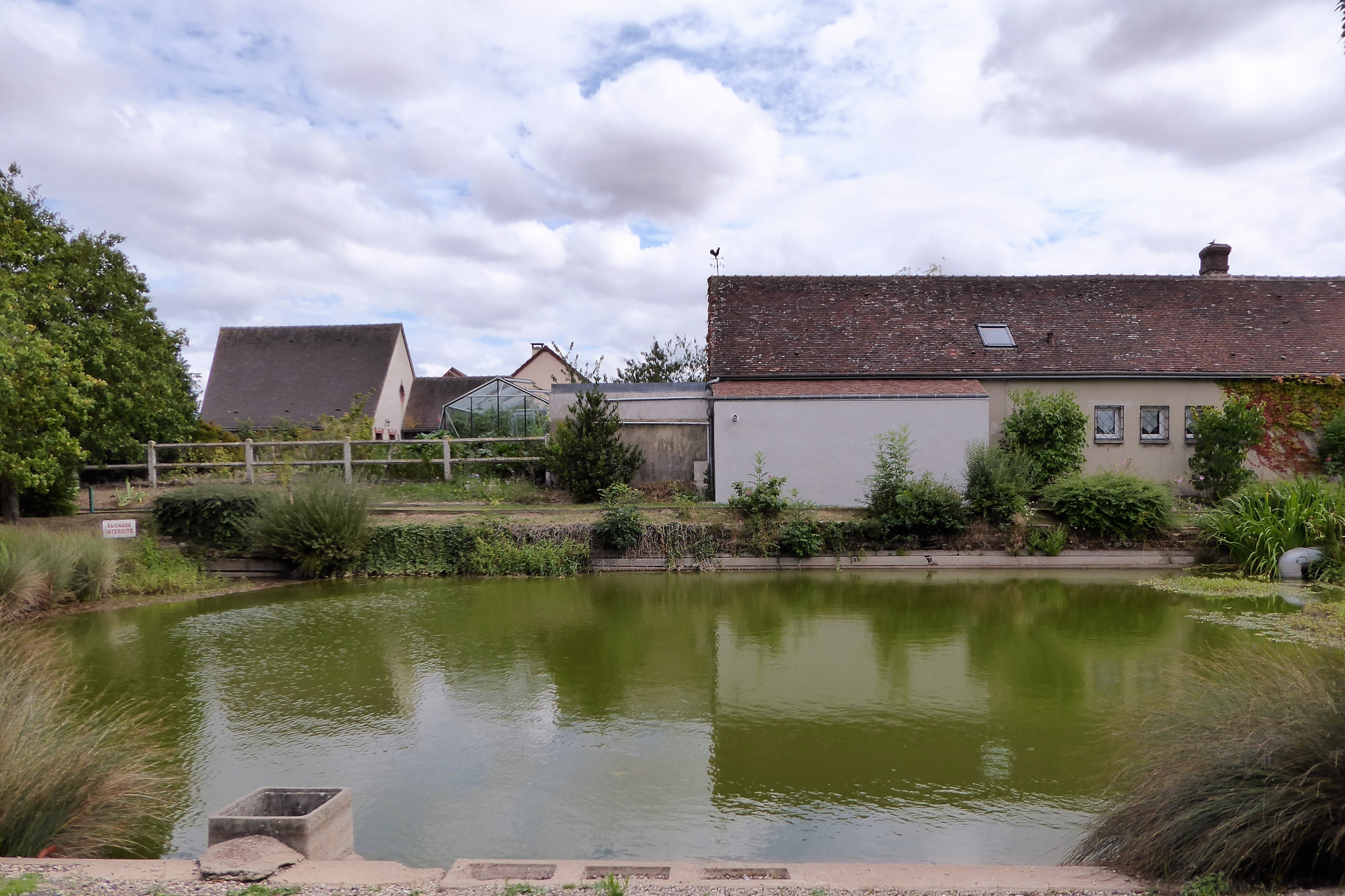
- The pond in Briconville

- Coat of arms
- Location of Briconville
- Location within France Location within Centre-Val de Loire
- Coordinates: 48°31′42″N 1°23′19″E
- Country: France
- Region: Centre-Val de Loire
- Department: Eure-et-Loir
- Arrondissement: Chartres
- Canton: Chartres-1
- Intercommunality: CA Chartres Métropole

Government
  - Mayor (2024–2026): Olivier Falézan
- Area^{1}: 6.26 km^{2} (2.42 sq mi)
- Elevation: 179 m (587 ft)
- Highest elevation: 195 m (640 ft)
- Lowest elevation: 162 m (531 ft)
- Population (2023): 271
  - Density: 43.3/km^{2} (112/sq mi)
- Time zone: UTC+01:00 (CET)
  - Summer (DST): UTC+02:00 (CEST)
- INSEE/Postal code: 28060 /28300
- ^{1} French Land Register data, which excludes lakes, ponds, glaciers > 1 km^{2} (0.386 sq mi or 247 acres) and river estuaries.

Briconville (French pronunciation: [bʁikɔ̃vil]) is a commune in the Eure-et-Loir department in northern France.

== Population ==
Historical population
Year	Pop.	±% p.a.
1968	44	—
1975	50	+1.84%
1982	78	+6.56%
1990	93	+2.22%
1999	112	+2.09%
2007	110	−0.22%
2012	178	+10.10%
2017	249	+6.94%
2023	271	+1.42%
Source: INSEE

== See also ==
- Communes of the Eure-et-Loir department
