= Ormoy, Eure-et-Loir =

Ormoy
- Commune
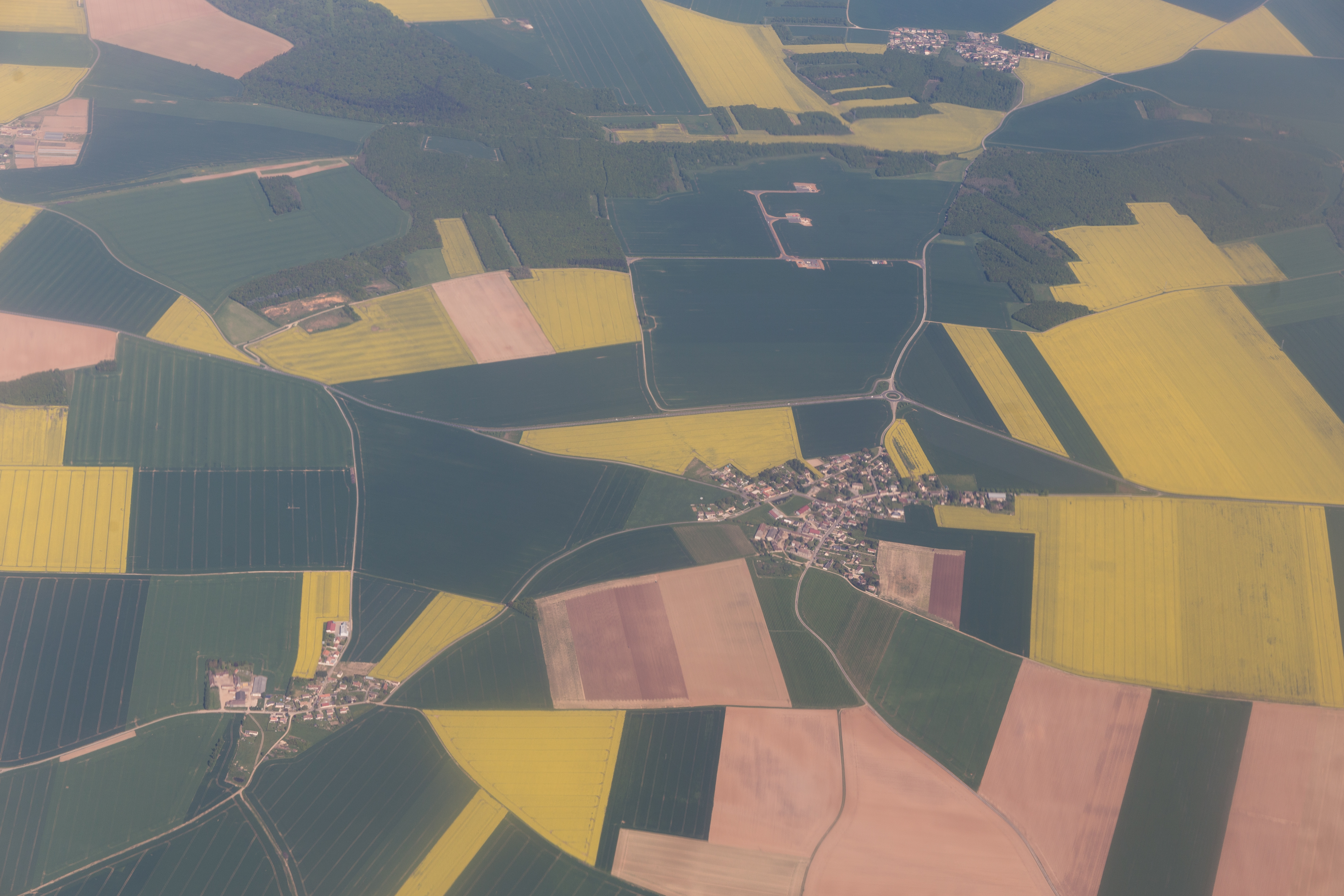
- Aerial view (2018)
- Location of Ormoy
- Location within France Location within Centre-Val de Loire
- Coordinates: 48°37′18″N 1°28′20″E
- Country: France
- Region: Centre-Val de Loire
- Department: Eure-et-Loir
- Arrondissement: Dreux
- Canton: Dreux-2
- Intercommunality: CA Pays de Dreux

Government
  - Mayor (2020–2026): Sylvie Challes
- Area^{1}: 9.04 km^{2} (3.49 sq mi)
- Elevation: 140 m (460 ft)
- Highest elevation: 155 m (509 ft)
- Lowest elevation: 111 m (364 ft)
- Population (2023): 229
  - Density: 25.3/km^{2} (65.6/sq mi)
- Time zone: UTC+01:00 (CET)
  - Summer (DST): UTC+02:00 (CEST)
- INSEE/Postal code: 28289 /28210
- ^{1} French Land Register data, which excludes lakes, ponds, glaciers > 1 km^{2} (0.386 sq mi or 247 acres) and river estuaries.

Ormoy (French pronunciation: [ɔʁmwa]) is a commune in the Eure-et-Loir department and Centre-Val de Loire region of north-central France. It lies 20 km north of Chartres and some 70 km west-south-west of Paris.

== Population ==
Historical population
| Year | Pop. | ±% p.a. |
|---|---|---|
| 1968 | 95 | — |
| 1975 | 100 | +0.74% |
| 1982 | 134 | +4.27% |
| 1990 | 164 | +2.56% |
| 1999 | 180 | +1.04% |
| 2007 | 251 | +4.24% |
| 2012 | 246 | −0.40% |
| 2017 | 235 | −0.91% |
| 2023 | 229 | −0.43% |
Source: INSEE

== See also ==
- Communes of the Eure-et-Loir department
