= La Madeleine-de-Nonancourt =

- Commune
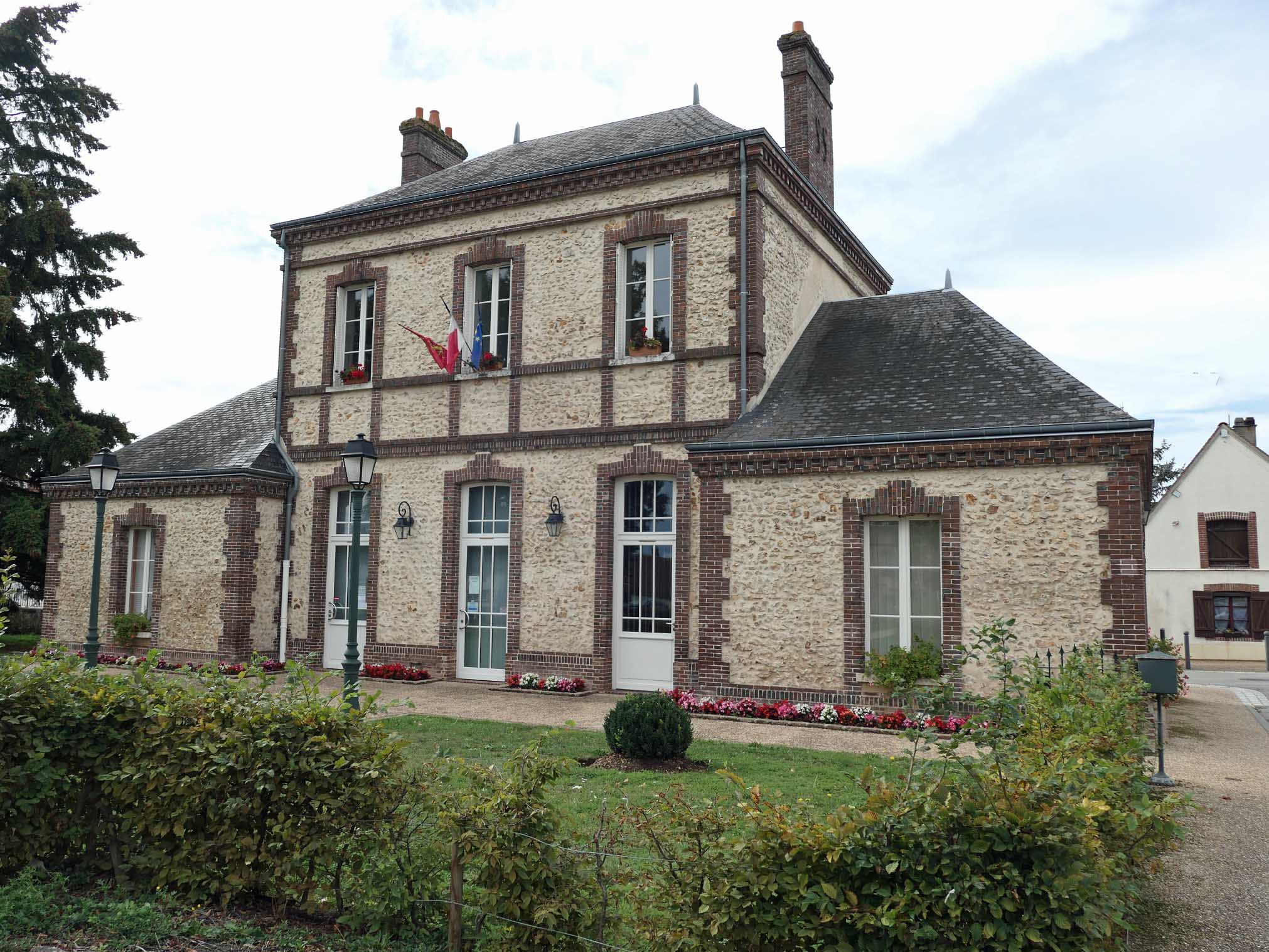
- Town hall
- Location of La Madeleine-de-Nonancourt
- Location within France Location within Normandy
- Coordinates: 48°46′26″N 1°12′13″E
- Country: France
- Region: Normandy
- Department: Eure
- Arrondissement: Évreux
- Canton: Verneuil d'Avre et d'Iton
- Intercommunality: CA Pays de Dreux

Government
  - Mayor (2020–2026): Daniel Colleu
- Area^{1}: 22.61 km^{2} (8.73 sq mi)
- Elevation: 133 m (436 ft)
- Highest elevation: 152 m (499 ft)
- Lowest elevation: 102 m (335 ft)
- Population (2023): 1,150
  - Density: 50.9/km^{2} (132/sq mi)
- Time zone: UTC+01:00 (CET)
  - Summer (DST): UTC+02:00 (CEST)
- INSEE/Postal code: 27378 /27320
- ^{1} French Land Register data, which excludes lakes, ponds, glaciers > 1 km^{2} (0.386 sq mi or 247 acres) and river estuaries.

La Madeleine-de-Nonancourt (French pronunciation: [la madlɛn də nɔnɑ̃kuʁ], literally La Madeleine of Nonancourt) is a commune in the Eure department in Normandy in north-western France.

== Population ==
Historical population
Year	Pop.	±% p.a.
1968	662	—
1975	762	+2.03%
1982	952	+3.23%
1990	1,150	+2.39%
1999	1,163	+0.12%
2007	1,181	+0.19%
2012	1,208	+0.45%
2017	1,146	−1.05%
2023	1,150	+0.06%
Source: INSEE

== See also ==
- Communes of the Eure department
