= Challet =

- Commune
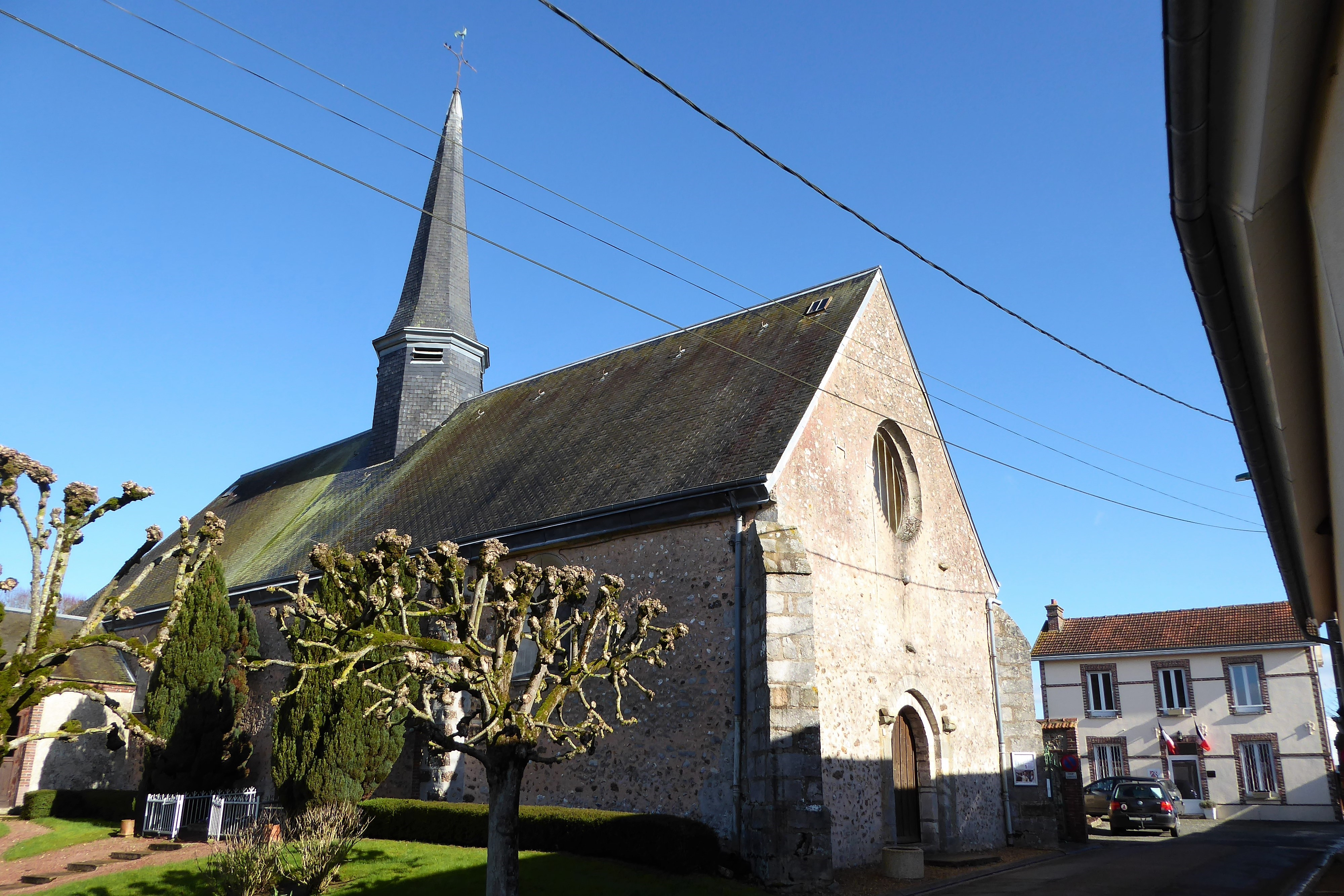
- The church and town hall in Challet
- Location of Challet
- Location within France Location within Centre-Val de Loire
- Coordinates: 48°33′20″N 1°26′02″E
- Country: France
- Region: Centre-Val de Loire
- Department: Eure-et-Loir
- Arrondissement: Chartres
- Canton: Chartres-1
- Intercommunality: CA Chartres Métropole

Government
  - Mayor (2020–2026): Hélène Denieault
- Area^{1}: 10.17 km^{2} (3.93 sq mi)
- Elevation: 195 m (640 ft)
- Highest elevation: 201 m (659 ft)
- Lowest elevation: 171 m (561 ft)
- Population (2023): 429
  - Density: 42.2/km^{2} (109/sq mi)
- Time zone: UTC+01:00 (CET)
  - Summer (DST): UTC+02:00 (CEST)
- INSEE/Postal code: 28068 /28300
- ^{1} French Land Register data, which excludes lakes, ponds, glaciers > 1 km^{2} (0.386 sq mi or 247 acres) and river estuaries.

Challet (French pronunciation: [ʃalɛ]) is a commune in the Eure-et-Loir department in northern France.

== Population ==
Historical population
Year	Pop.	±% p.a.
1968	210	—
1975	292	+4.82%
1982	331	+1.81%
1990	356	+0.91%
1999	385	+0.87%
2007	403	+0.57%
2012	434	+1.49%
2017	433	−0.05%
2023	429	−0.15%
Source: INSEE

== See also ==
- Communes of the Eure-et-Loir department
