= Villafranca Piemonte =

- Comune
- Comune di Villafranca Piemonte
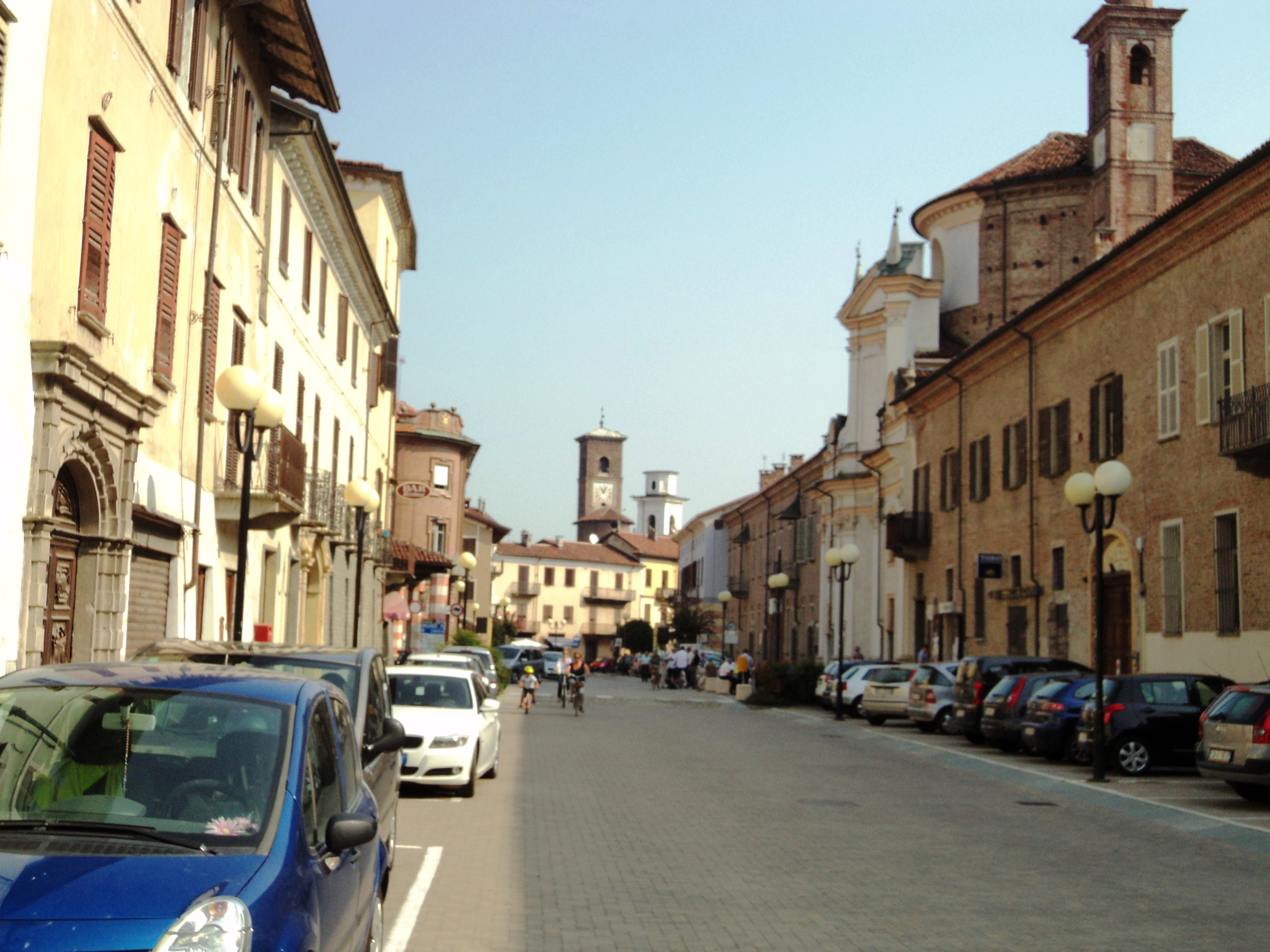

- Coat of arms

- Location within Italy Location within Piedmont
- Coordinates: 44°47′N 7°30′E
- Country: Italy
- Region: Piedmont
- Metropolitan city: Turin (TO)

Government
  - Mayor: Agostino Bottario

Area
  - Total: 50.79 km^{2} (19.61 sq mi)
- Elevation: 253 m (830 ft)

Population (30 November 2018)
  - Total: 4,617
  - Density: 90.90/km^{2} (235.4/sq mi)
- Demonym: Villafranchesi
- Time zone: UTC+1 (CET)
  - Summer (DST): UTC+2 (CEST)
- Postal code: 10068
- Dialing code: 011
- Website: Official website

Villafranca Piemonte is a comune (municipality) in the Metropolitan City of Turin in the Italian region Piedmont, located about 35 km southwest of Turin.

Villafranca Piemonte borders the following municipalities: Vigone, Pancalieri, Cavour, Faule, Moretta, Barge, and Cardè.

== Economy ==
Villafranca's economy was traditionally based on fishing; today the main activities are agriculture and animal husbandry.

== Twin towns ==
- Belhomert-Guéhouville, France
- El Trébol, Argentina
- Saint-Maurice-Saint-Germain, France
