= François Lamy =

François Lamy may refer to:

- Amédée-François Lamy (1858–1900), French colonial soldier
- François Lamy (theologian) (1636–1711), French Benedictine ascetical and apologetic writer
- François Lamy (politician) (born 1959), French politician
