= Nogent-le-Rotrou =

- Subprefecture and commune
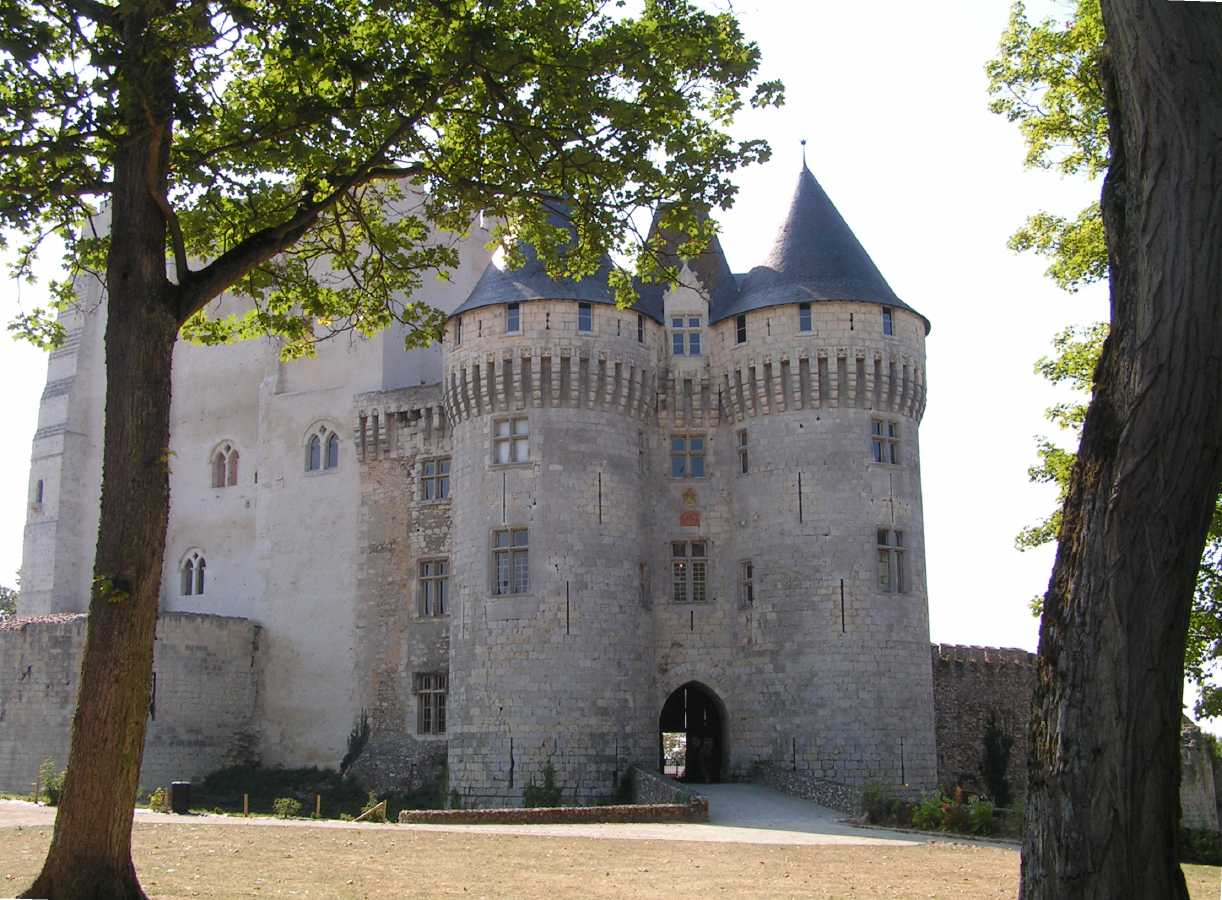
- Château Saint-Jean

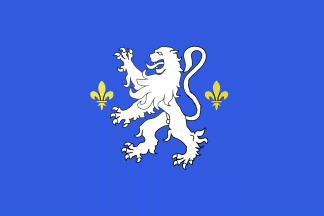
- Flag Coat of arms
- Location of Nogent-le-Rotrou
- Location within France Location within Centre-Val de Loire
- Coordinates: 48°19′21″N 0°49′21″E
- Country: France
- Region: Centre-Val de Loire
- Department: Eure-et-Loir
- Arrondissement: Nogent-le-Rotrou
- Canton: Nogent-le-Rotrou
- Intercommunality: Perche

Government
  - Mayor (2024–2026): Jérémie Crabbe
- Area^{1}: 23.49 km^{2} (9.07 sq mi)
- Elevation: 108 m (354 ft)
- Highest elevation: 213 m (699 ft)
- Lowest elevation: 97 m (318 ft)
- Population (2023): 9,292
  - Density: 395.6/km^{2} (1,025/sq mi)
- Time zone: UTC+01:00 (CET)
  - Summer (DST): UTC+02:00 (CEST)
- INSEE/Postal code: 28280 /28400
- ^{1} French Land Register data, which excludes lakes, ponds, glaciers > 1 km^{2} (0.386 sq mi or 247 acres) and river estuaries.

Nogent-le-Rotrou (French pronunciation: [nɔʒɑ̃ lə ʁɔtʁu]) is a commune in the department of Eure-et-Loir, northern France.

It is a sub-prefecture and is located on the river Huisne, 56 kilometres west of Chartres on the RN23 and 150 kilometres south west of Paris, to which it is linked by both rail and motorway.

== History ==
Nogent-le-Rotrou was the former capital of the Perche with the count living in the impressive medieval Château Saint-Jean which still dominates the town from a plateau of the same name. Its keep dates from the first half of the 11th century.

The town gets the second part of its name from Rotrou I, Count of Perche. In the early part of the 17th century the overlordship was acquired by the duke of Sully, financial minister of Henry IV. In the courtyard of the hospital, originally founded at the end of the 12th century, there is a small building containing the tomb of Sully and his wife.

== Economy ==
The town lies within the Perche at the heart of a vast agricultural zone. Many jobs were therefore tied to agriculture, but the numbers declined sharply from the late 1970s with up to 5% of jobs being shed each year. Industrial employment owed much to the automotive sector which counted for almost 10% of jobs in the 1980s and 1990s and these were heavily linked to components manufacturer, Valeo. The company had a local workforce of over 1000 in 1999, but this too has been in decline as Valeo has delocalised to follow clients such as Renault to Romania. The headcount had fallen to 800 by April 2007, when Valeo announced that would be cutting a further 260 jobs between July 2007 and December 2009. All is not doom and gloom, however, as the German medical and pharmaceutical supplier, B. Braun Melsungen announced in early 2009 that it would be investing 20 million euros to modernise its local plant for it to specialise in the production of infusion pumps used in the intravenous administration of drugs. As a result, employment on the B. Braun site is to increase from 450 to 500.

There is also a large military presence, with the town being the base for one of France's three civil defense units. L'Unité d'instruction et d'intervention de la Sécurité civile n°1 (UIISC1) was created in 1978 and in 2001 there were 650 men at the base. They are used both at home and abroad, in all types of disaster situation.

== Population ==
Historical population

Year	Pop.	±% p.a.
1793	6,850	—
1800	6,514	−0.72%
1806	6,634	+0.30%
1821	6,599	−0.04%
1831	6,825	+0.34%
1836	6,861	+0.11%
1841	6,929	+0.20%
1846	7,057	+0.37%
1851	6,983	−0.21%
1856	6,770	−0.62%
1861	7,105	+0.97%
1866	7,006	−0.28%
1872	7,056	+0.12%
1876	7,638	+2.00%
1881	7,778	+0.36%
1886	8,372	+1.48%
1891	8,668	+0.70%
1896	8,489	−0.42%
1901	8,415	−0.17%

Year	Pop.	±% p.a.
1906	8,406	−0.02%
1911	8,279	−0.30%
1921	7,475	−1.02%
1926	7,218	−0.70%
1931	7,206	−0.03%
1936	7,326	+0.33%
1946	7,798	+0.63%
1954	8,765	+1.47%
1962	9,428	+0.92%
1968	11,578	+3.48%
1975	12,806	+1.45%
1982	12,464	−0.39%
1990	11,591	−0.90%
1999	11,524	−0.06%
2007	11,358	−0.18%
2012	10,643	−1.29%
2017	9,715	−1.81%
2023	9,292	−0.74%

Source: EHESS and INSEE (1968-2023)

== Administration ==
The previous mayor was the centre-left François Huwart, who held power between 1989 and 2020. He followed in the footsteps of his father, Robert Huwart, who was mayor from 1965 to 1987.

== Sights ==
In addition to the château, Nogent preserves three Gothic churches and the remains of the old priory of St Denis, and there are statues of General St Pol, killed at the Siege of Sevastopol, and of the poet Rémy Belleau, a native of the town.

== Prominent people connected to Nogent-le-Rotrou ==
- Clara Filleul (1822–1878), painter, children's writer
- Gustave Le Bon (born 1841), social psychologist, sociologist, anthropologist
- Yoann Kowal (born 1987), athlete
- Paul Tirard (born 1879), diplomat
- Maximilien de Béthune, Duke of Sully
- Mathilde Mauté, wife of the poet Paul Verlaine
- Joël Gouhier (born 1949), racing driver

== Sister city ==
Wayne, IL

Midhurst, West Sussex, United Kingdom

Baiersbronn, Germany

== Climate ==
Climate data for Nogent-le-Rotrou (Vichères) (2006–2020 normals, extremes 2006–present)
Month	Jan	Feb	Mar	Apr	May	Jun	Jul	Aug	Sep	Oct	Nov	Dec	Year
Record high °C (°F)	15.7 (60.3)	20.2 (68.4)	24.1 (75.4)	27.7 (81.9)	28.4 (83.1)	35.8 (96.4)	39.8 (103.6)	37.8 (100.0)	34.0 (93.2)	27.8 (82.0)	21.6 (70.9)	14.7 (58.5)	39.8 (103.6)
Mean daily maximum °C (°F)	6.7 (44.1)	7.9 (46.2)	11.2 (52.2)	15.4 (59.7)	18.3 (64.9)	21.9 (71.4)	24.7 (76.5)	23.7 (74.7)	20.9 (69.6)	15.7 (60.3)	10.6 (51.1)	7.4 (45.3)	15.4 (59.7)
Daily mean °C (°F)	4.4 (39.9)	4.9 (40.8)	7.3 (45.1)	10.5 (50.9)	13.3 (55.9)	16.7 (62.1)	19.1 (66.4)	18.4 (65.1)	15.9 (60.6)	12.1 (53.8)	7.9 (46.2)	5.0 (41.0)	11.3 (52.3)
Mean daily minimum °C (°F)	2.1 (35.8)	1.8 (35.2)	3.4 (38.1)	5.6 (42.1)	8.4 (47.1)	11.6 (52.9)	13.5 (56.3)	13.2 (55.8)	10.9 (51.6)	8.5 (47.3)	5.2 (41.4)	2.5 (36.5)	7.2 (45.0)
Record low °C (°F)	−11.8 (10.8)	−12.5 (9.5)	−8.3 (17.1)	−3.5 (25.7)	−0.8 (30.6)	2.8 (37.0)	5.8 (42.4)	5.4 (41.7)	2.6 (36.7)	−1.8 (28.8)	−7.2 (19.0)	−10.1 (13.8)	−12.5 (9.5)
Average precipitation mm (inches)	63.9 (2.52)	59.4 (2.34)	62.9 (2.48)	44.3 (1.74)	74.4 (2.93)	63.8 (2.51)	48.2 (1.90)	48.2 (1.90)	43.1 (1.70)	67.6 (2.66)	71.6 (2.82)	84.5 (3.33)	731.9 (28.81)
Average precipitation days (≥ 1.0 mm)	12.8	11.4	10.9	7.9	10.3	9.3	7.7	7.9	7.2	10.7	11.9	12.9	121.0
Source: Meteociel

== See also ==
- Communes of the Eure-et-Loir department
- Perche
