= Arrondissement of Nogent-le-Rotrou =

Coordinates: 48°19′N 0°49′E

Nogent-le-Rotrou
- Arrondissement
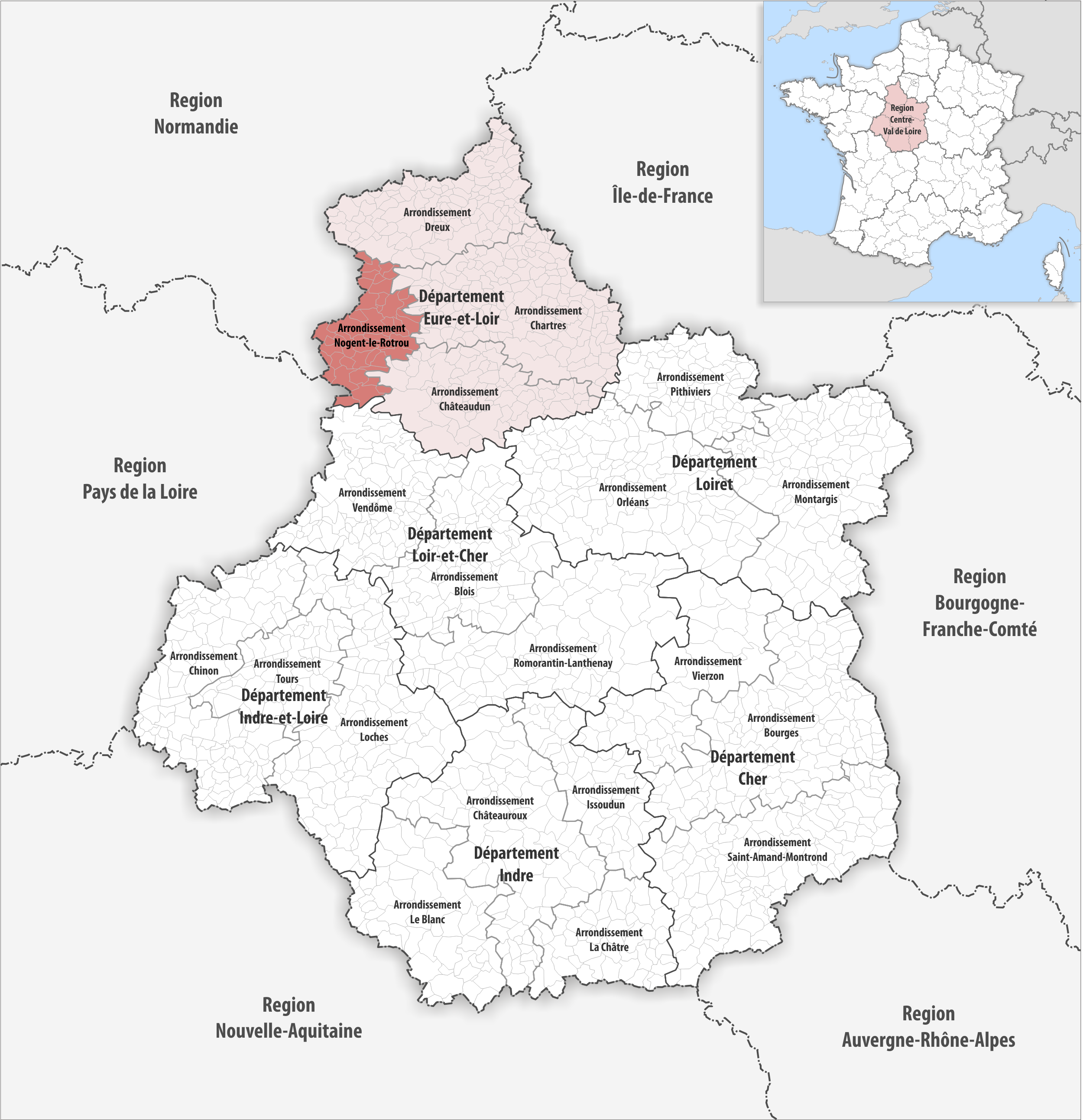
- Location within the region Centre-Val de Loire
- Country: France
- Region: Centre-Val de Loire
- Department: Eure-et-Loir
- No. of communes: {{{nbcomm}}}
- Area: 811.1 km^{2} (313.2 sq mi)
- Population (2023): 34,845
  - Density: 42.96/km^{2} (111.3/sq mi)
- INSEE code: 284

The arrondissement of Nogent-le-Rotrou is an arrondissement of France in the Eure-et-Loir department in the Centre-Val de Loire region. It has 48 communes. Its population is 34,922 (2021), and its area is 811.1 km^{2} (313.2 sq mi).

== Composition ==
The communes of the arrondissement of Nogent-le-Rotrou, and their INSEE codes, are:

1. Arcisses (28236)
2. Argenvilliers (28010)
3. Les Autels-Villevillon (28016)
4. Authon-du-Perche (28018)
5. La Bazoche-Gouet (28027)
6. Beaumont-les-Autels (28031)
7. Belhomert-Guéhouville (28033)
8. Béthonvilliers (28038)
9. Champrond-en-Gâtine (28071)
10. Champrond-en-Perchet (28072)
11. Chapelle-Guillaume (28078)
12. Chapelle-Royale (28079)
13. Charbonnières (28080)
14. Chassant (28086)
15. Combres (28105)
16. Les Corvées-les-Yys (28109)
17. Coudray-au-Perche (28111)
18. La Croix-du-Perche (28119)
19. Les Étilleux (28144)
20. Fontaine-Simon (28156)
21. Frazé (28161)
22. Friaize (28166)
23. La Gaudaine (28175)
24. Happonvilliers (28192)
25. La Loupe (28214)
26. Luigny (28219)
27. Manou (28232)
28. Marolles-les-Buis (28237)
29. Meaucé (28240)
30. Miermaigne (28252)
31. Montigny-le-Chartif (28261)
32. Montireau (28264)
33. Montlandon (28265)
34. Moulhard (28273)
35. Nogent-le-Rotrou (28280)
36. Nonvilliers-Grandhoux (28282)
37. Saint-Bomer (28327)
38. Saint-Éliph (28335)
39. Saintigny (28331)
40. Saint-Jean-Pierre-Fixte (28342)
41. Saint-Maurice-Saint-Germain (28354)
42. Saint-Victor-de-Buthon (28362)
43. Souancé-au-Perche (28378)
44. Le Thieulin (28385)
45. Thiron-Gardais (28387)
46. Trizay-Coutretot-Saint-Serge (28395)
47. Vaupillon (28401)
48. Vichères (28407)

== History ==
The arrondissement of Nogent-le-Rotrou was created in 1800, disbanded in 1926 and restored in 1943.

As a result of the reorganisation of the cantons of France which came into effect in 2015, the borders of the cantons are no longer related to the borders of the arrondissements. The cantons of the arrondissement of Nogent-le-Rotrou were, as of January 2015:

1. Authon-du-Perche
2. La Loupe
3. Nogent-le-Rotrou
4. Thiron-Gardais
