= Montlandon =

- Commune
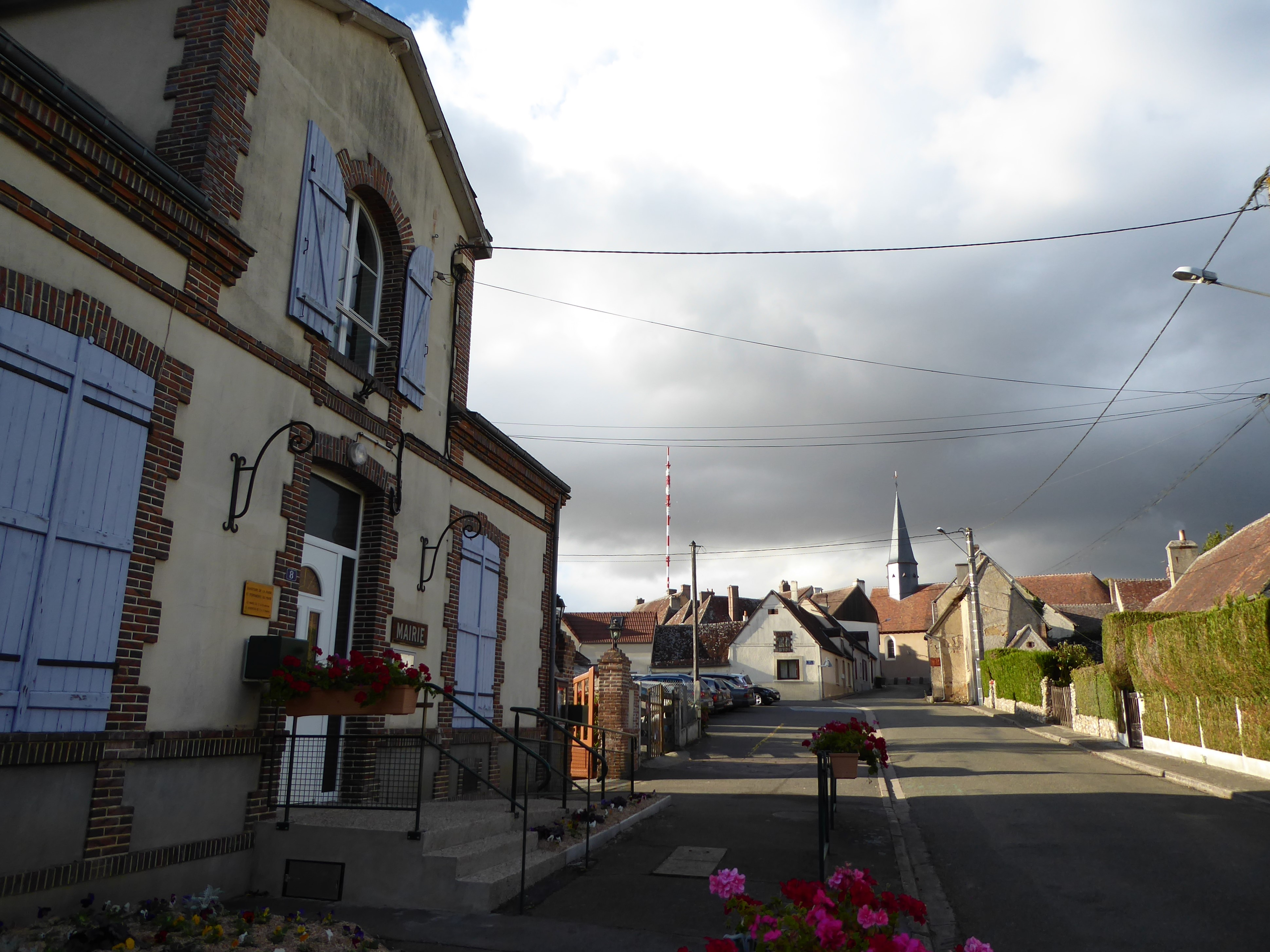
- The town hall and surroundings in Montlandon
- Location of Montlandon
- Location within France Location within Centre-Val de Loire
- Coordinates: 48°23′36″N 1°01′28″E
- Country: France
- Region: Centre-Val de Loire
- Department: Eure-et-Loir
- Arrondissement: Nogent-le-Rotrou
- Canton: Nogent-le-Rotrou

Government
  - Mayor (2020–2026): Francis Fezard
- Area^{1}: 2.87 km^{2} (1.11 sq mi)
- Elevation: 201 m (659 ft)
- Highest elevation: 283 m (928 ft)
- Lowest elevation: 225 m (738 ft)
- Population (2023): 252
  - Density: 87.8/km^{2} (227/sq mi)
- Time zone: UTC+01:00 (CET)
  - Summer (DST): UTC+02:00 (CEST)
- INSEE/Postal code: 28265 /28240
- ^{1} French Land Register data, which excludes lakes, ponds, glaciers > 1 km^{2} (0.386 sq mi or 247 acres) and river estuaries.

Montlandon (French pronunciation: [mɔ̃lɑ̃dɔ̃]) is a commune in the Eure-et-Loir department in northern France.

== Geography ==
The Commune along with another 70 communes shares part of a 47,681 hectare, Natura 2000 conservation area, called the Forêts et étangs du Perche.

== Population ==
Historical population
Year	Pop.	±% p.a.
1968	222	—
1975	218	−0.26%
1982	217	−0.07%
1990	183	−2.11%
1999	209	+1.49%
2007	279	+3.68%
2012	268	−0.80%
2017	241	−2.10%
2023	252	+0.75%
Source: INSEE

== See also ==
- Communes of the Eure-et-Loir department
