= Manou, Eure-et-Loir =

Manou
- Commune
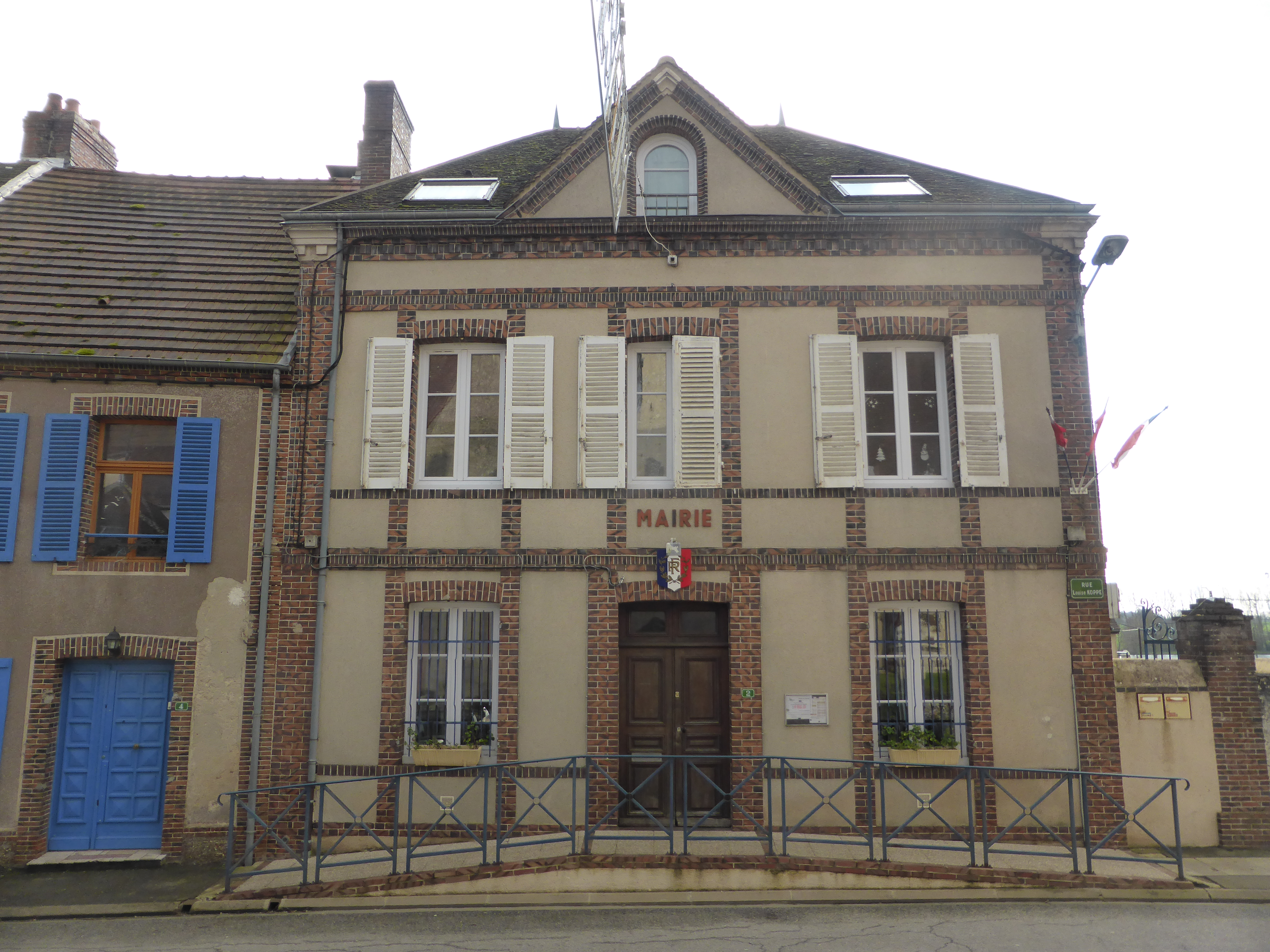
- The town hall in Manou
- Location of Manou
- Location within France Location within Centre-Val de Loire
- Coordinates: 48°31′11″N 0°59′01″E
- Country: France
- Region: Centre-Val de Loire
- Department: Eure-et-Loir
- Arrondissement: Nogent-le-Rotrou
- Canton: Nogent-le-Rotrou

Government
  - Mayor (2020–2026): Stéphanie Coutel
- Area^{1}: 13.38 km^{2} (5.17 sq mi)
- Elevation: 2,002 m (6,568 ft)
- Highest elevation: 277 m (909 ft)
- Lowest elevation: 194 m (636 ft)
- Population (2023): 608
  - Density: 45.4/km^{2} (118/sq mi)
- Time zone: UTC+01:00 (CET)
  - Summer (DST): UTC+02:00 (CEST)
- INSEE/Postal code: 28232 /28240
- ^{1} French Land Register data, which excludes lakes, ponds, glaciers > 1 km^{2} (0.386 sq mi or 247 acres) and river estuaries.

Manou (French pronunciation: [manu]) is a commune in the Eure-et-Loir department in northern France.

== Geography ==
The Commune along with another 70 communes shares part of a 47,681 hectare, Natura 2000 conservation area, called the Forêts et étangs du Perche.

== Population ==
Historical population
Year	Pop.	±% p.a.
1968	392	—
1975	461	+2.34%
1982	474	+0.40%
1990	433	−1.12%
1999	511	+1.86%
2007	559	+1.13%
2012	570	+0.39%
2017	597	+0.93%
2023	608	+0.30%
Source: INSEE

== See also ==
- Communes of the Eure-et-Loir department
