= Fontaine-Simon =

- Commune
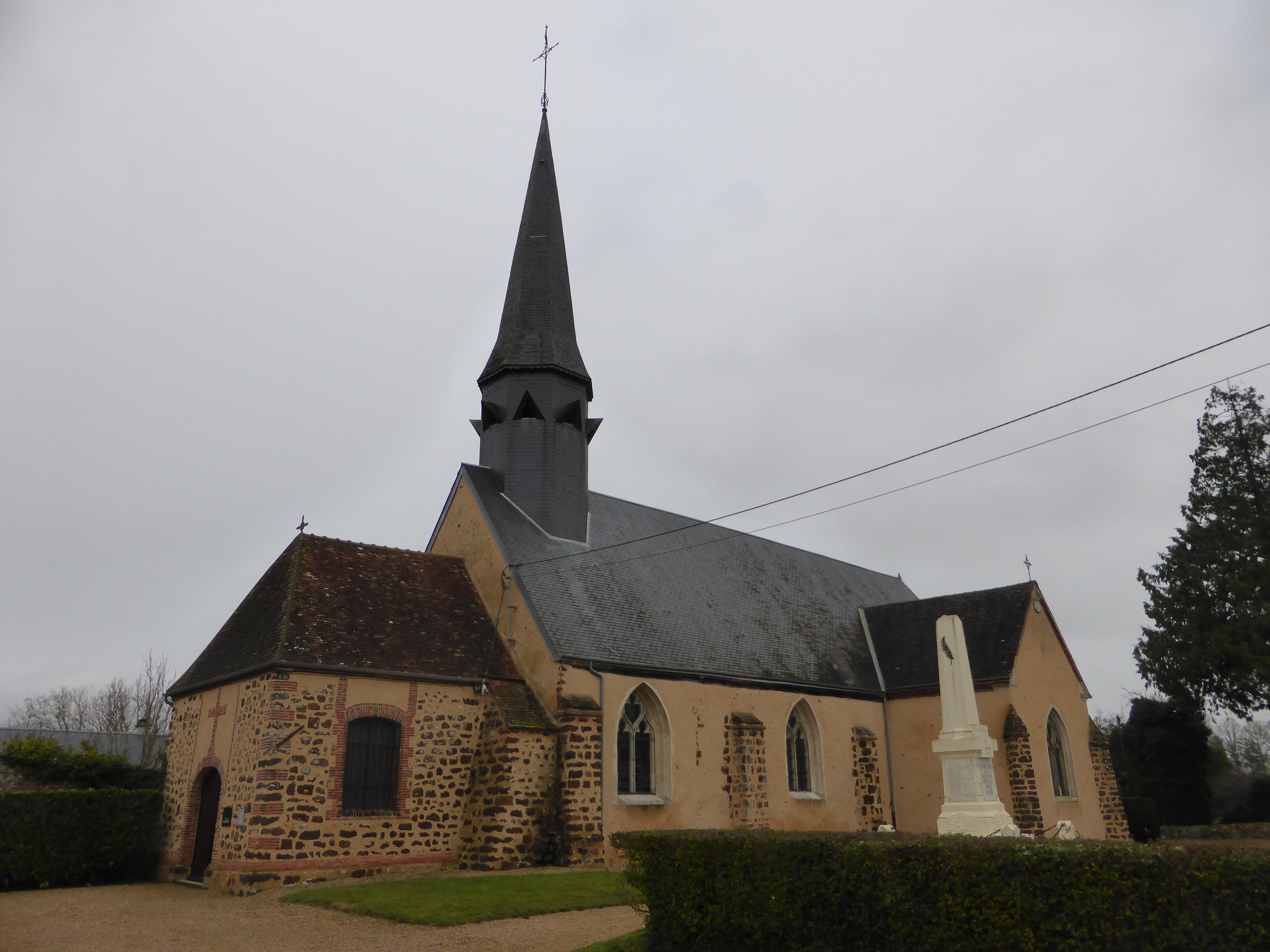
- The church in Fontaine-Simon
- Location of Fontaine-Simon
- Location within France Location within Centre-Val de Loire
- Coordinates: 48°30′16″N 1°01′12″E
- Country: France
- Region: Centre-Val de Loire
- Department: Eure-et-Loir
- Arrondissement: Nogent-le-Rotrou
- Canton: Nogent-le-Rotrou
- Intercommunality: Terres de Perche

Government
  - Mayor (2020–2026): André Dogimont
- Area^{1}: 16.88 km^{2} (6.52 sq mi)
- Elevation: 200 m (660 ft)
- Highest elevation: 254 m (833 ft)
- Lowest elevation: 189 m (620 ft)
- Population (2023): 888
  - Density: 52.6/km^{2} (136/sq mi)
- Time zone: UTC+01:00 (CET)
  - Summer (DST): UTC+02:00 (CEST)
- INSEE/Postal code: 28156 /28240
- ^{1} French Land Register data, which excludes lakes, ponds, glaciers > 1 km^{2} (0.386 sq mi or 247 acres) and river estuaries.

Fontaine-Simon (French pronunciation: [fɔ̃tɛn simɔ̃]) is a commune in the Eure-et-Loir department in northern France.

== Geography ==
The Commune along with another 70 communes shares part of a 47,681 hectare, Natura 2000 conservation area, called the Forêts et étangs du Perche.

== Population ==
Historical population
Year	Pop.	±% p.a.
1968	705	—
1975	640	−1.37%
1982	678	+0.83%
1990	760	+1.44%
1999	838	+1.09%
2007	870	+0.47%
2012	928	+1.30%
2017	924	−0.09%
2023	888	−0.66%
Source: INSEE

== See also ==
- Communes of the Eure-et-Loir department
