= La Gaudaine =

- Commune
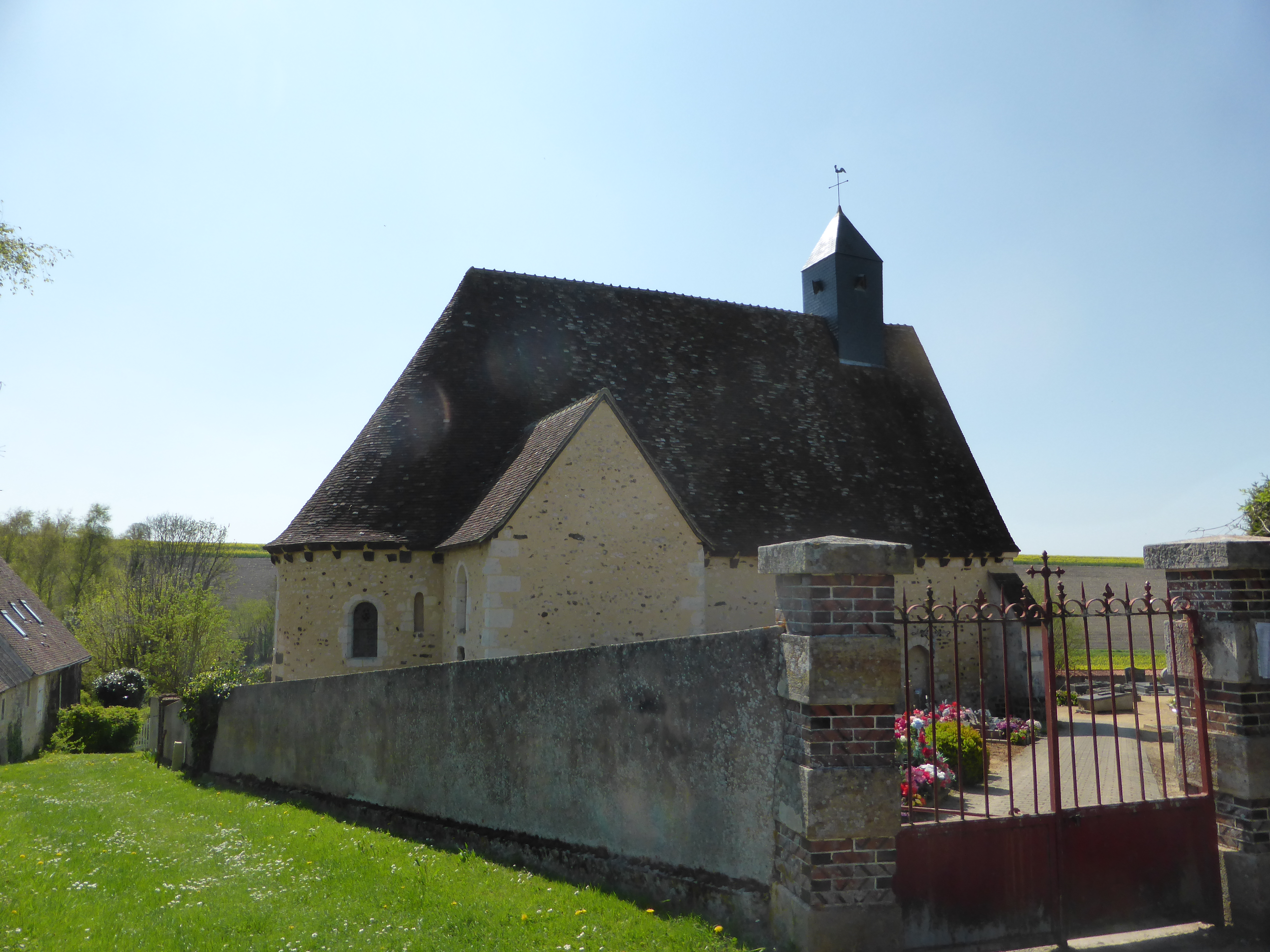
- The church in La Gaudaine
- Location of La Gaudaine
- Location within France Location within Centre-Val de Loire
- Coordinates: 48°18′11″N 0°55′50″E
- Country: France
- Region: Centre-Val de Loire
- Department: Eure-et-Loir
- Arrondissement: Nogent-le-Rotrou
- Canton: Nogent-le-Rotrou
- Intercommunality: Perche

Government
  - Mayor (2020–2026): Daniel Bouygues
- Area^{1}: 9.19 km^{2} (3.55 sq mi)
- Elevation: 250 m (820 ft)
- Highest elevation: 286 m (938 ft)
- Lowest elevation: 190 m (620 ft)
- Population (2023): 178
  - Density: 19.4/km^{2} (50.2/sq mi)
- Time zone: UTC+01:00 (CET)
  - Summer (DST): UTC+02:00 (CEST)
- INSEE/Postal code: 28175 /28400
- ^{1} French Land Register data, which excludes lakes, ponds, glaciers > 1 km^{2} (0.386 sq mi or 247 acres) and river estuaries.

La Gaudaine (French pronunciation: [la ɡodɛn]) is a commune in the Eure-et-Loir department in northern France.

== Population ==
Historical population
Year	Pop.	±% p.a.
1968	112	—
1975	104	−1.05%
1982	108	+0.54%
1990	128	+2.15%
1999	154	+2.08%
2007	180	+1.97%
2012	175	−0.56%
2017	175	+0.00%
2023	178	+0.28%
Source: INSEE

== See also ==
- Communes of the Eure-et-Loir department
