= Saint-Éliph =

- Commune
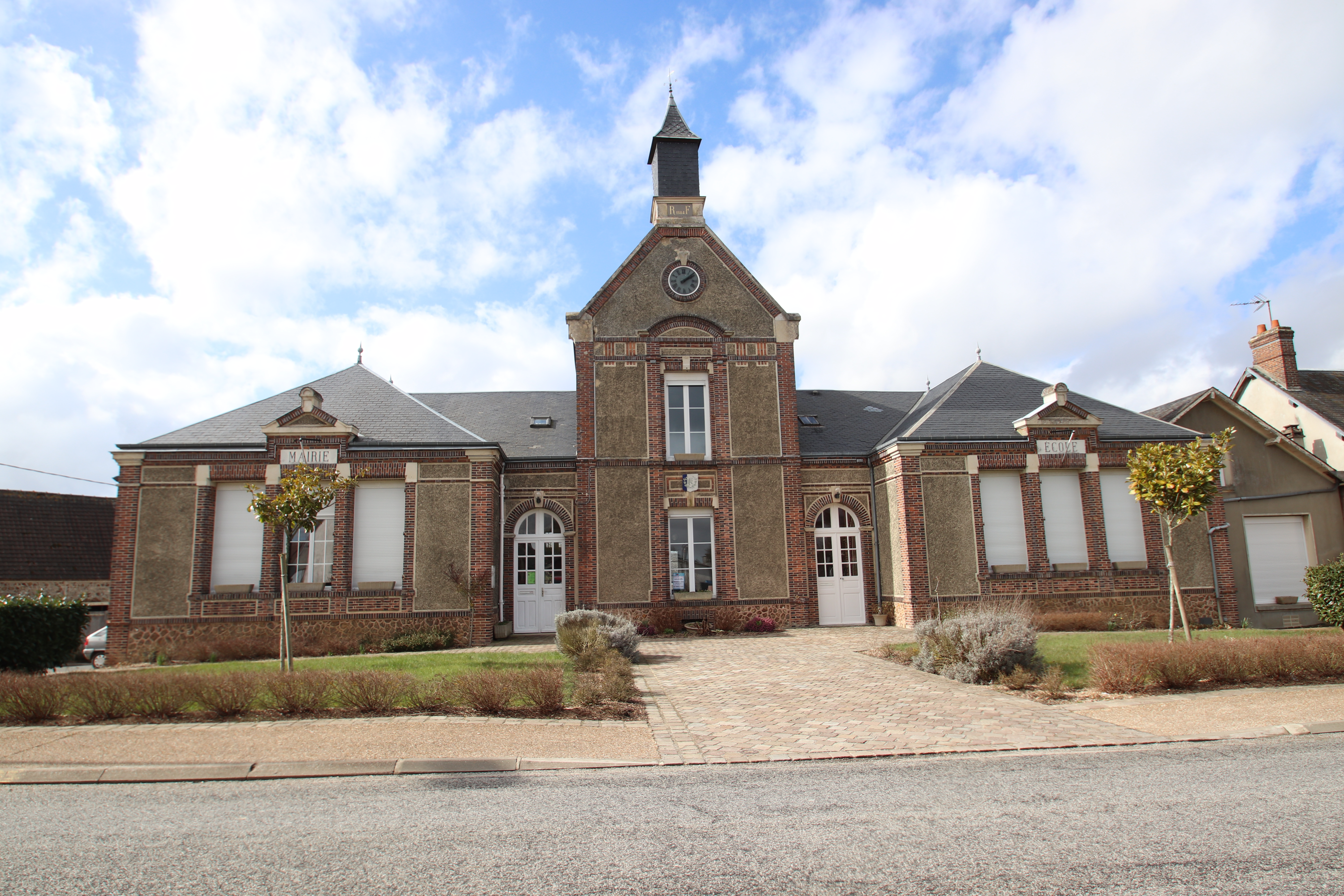
- The town hall in Saint-Éliph
- Location of Saint-Éliph
- Location within France Location within Centre-Val de Loire
- Coordinates: 48°27′03″N 1°01′36″E
- Country: France
- Region: Centre-Val de Loire
- Department: Eure-et-Loir
- Arrondissement: Nogent-le-Rotrou
- Canton: Nogent-le-Rotrou

Government
  - Mayor (2020–2026): Christophe Barral
- Area^{1}: 23.46 km^{2} (9.06 sq mi)
- Elevation: 230 m (750 ft)
- Highest elevation: 252 m (827 ft)
- Lowest elevation: 189 m (620 ft)
- Population (2023): 828
  - Density: 35.3/km^{2} (91.4/sq mi)
- Time zone: UTC+01:00 (CET)
  - Summer (DST): UTC+02:00 (CEST)
- INSEE/Postal code: 28335 /28240
- ^{1} French Land Register data, which excludes lakes, ponds, glaciers > 1 km^{2} (0.386 sq mi or 247 acres) and river estuaries.

Saint-Éliph (French pronunciation: [sɛ̃.t‿elif]) is a commune in the Eure-et-Loir department in northern France.

== Geography ==
The Commune along with another 70 communes shares part of a 47,681 hectare, Natura 2000 conservation area, called the Forêts et étangs du Perche.

== Population ==
Historical population
Year	Pop.	±% p.a.
1968	543	—
1975	641	+2.40%
1982	656	+0.33%
1990	738	+1.48%
1999	755	+0.25%
2007	806	+0.82%
2012	920	+2.68%
2017	875	−1.00%
2023	828	−0.92%
Source: INSEE

== See also ==
- Communes of the Eure-et-Loir department
