= Les Corvées-les-Yys =

- Commune
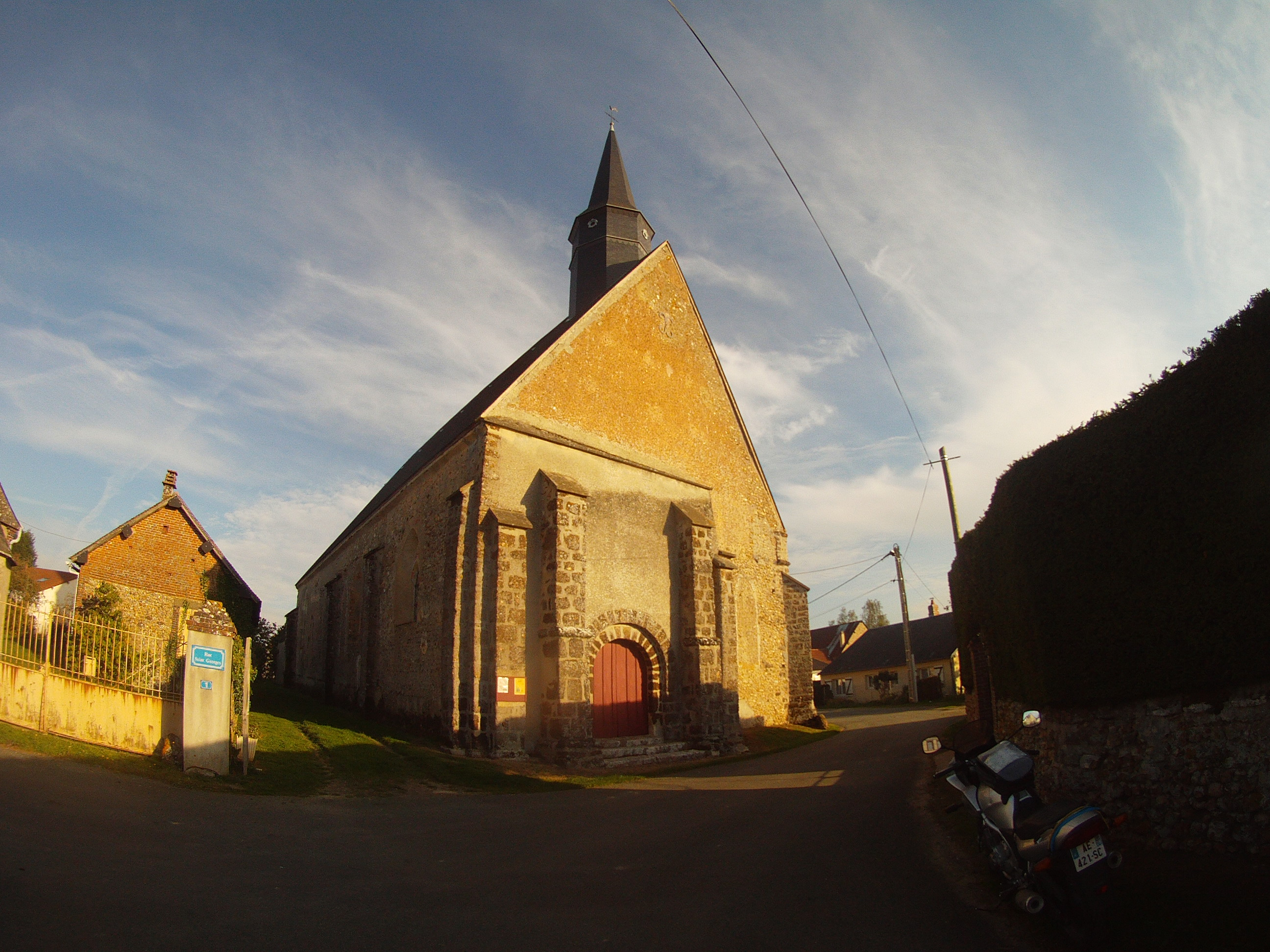
- The church of Saint-Georges in Les Corvées-les-Yys
- Location of Les Corvées-les-Yys
- Location within France Location within Centre-Val de Loire
- Coordinates: 48°21′47″N 1°08′27″E
- Country: France
- Region: Centre-Val de Loire
- Department: Eure-et-Loir
- Arrondissement: Nogent-le-Rotrou
- Canton: Nogent-le-Rotrou
- Intercommunality: Terres de Perche

Government
  - Mayor (2020–2026): David Monnier
- Area^{1}: 13.51 km^{2} (5.22 sq mi)
- Elevation: 227 m (745 ft)
- Highest elevation: 257 m (843 ft)
- Lowest elevation: 196 m (643 ft)
- Population (2023): 326
  - Density: 24.1/km^{2} (62.5/sq mi)
- Time zone: UTC+01:00 (CET)
  - Summer (DST): UTC+02:00 (CEST)
- INSEE/Postal code: 28109 /28240
- ^{1} French Land Register data, which excludes lakes, ponds, glaciers > 1 km^{2} (0.386 sq mi or 247 acres) and river estuaries.

Les Corvées-les-Yys (French pronunciation: [le kɔʁve le.z‿is]) is a commune in the Eure-et-Loir department in northern France.

== Geography ==
The Commune along with another 70 communes shares part of a 47,681 hectare, Natura 2000 conservation area, called the Forêts et étangs du Perche.

== Population ==
Historical population
Year	Pop.	±% p.a.
1968	245	—
1975	189	−3.64%
1982	199	+0.74%
1990	195	−0.25%
1999	214	+1.04%
2007	276	+3.23%
2012	320	+3.00%
2017	316	−0.25%
2023	326	+0.52%
Source: INSEE

== See also ==
- Communes of the Eure-et-Loir department
