= Champrond-en-Gâtine =

- Commune
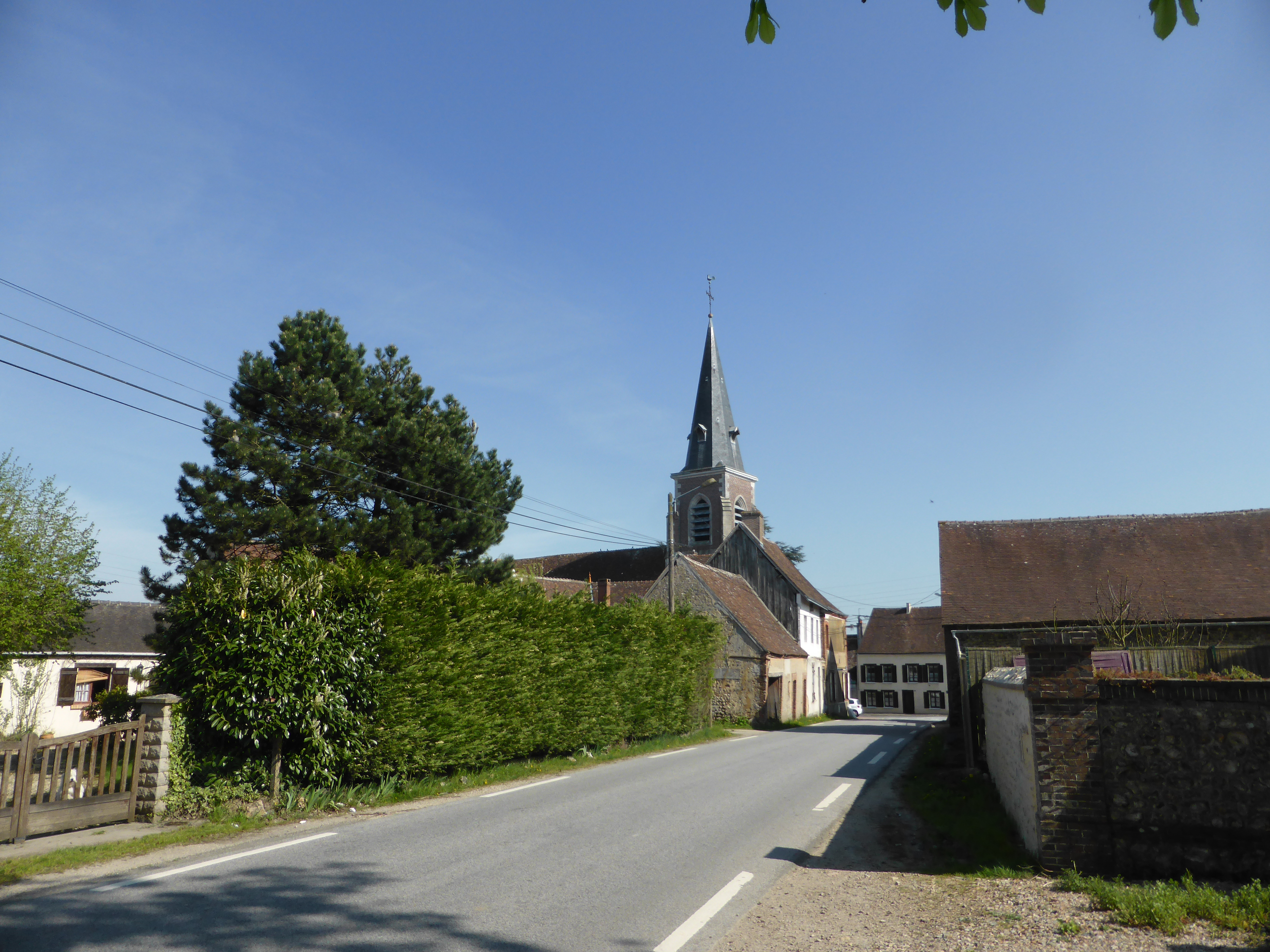
- The church and surroundings in Champrond-en-Gâtine

- Coat of arms
- Location of Champrond-en-Gâtine
- Location within France Location within Centre-Val de Loire
- Coordinates: 48°24′11″N 1°04′35″E
- Country: France
- Region: Centre-Val de Loire
- Department: Eure-et-Loir
- Arrondissement: Nogent-le-Rotrou
- Canton: Nogent-le-Rotrou

Government
  - Mayor (2020–2026): Eric Legros
- Area^{1}: 33.68 km^{2} (13.00 sq mi)
- Elevation: 250 m (820 ft)
- Highest elevation: 277 m (909 ft)
- Lowest elevation: 207 m (679 ft)
- Population (2023): 744
  - Density: 22.1/km^{2} (57.2/sq mi)
- Time zone: UTC+01:00 (CET)
  - Summer (DST): UTC+02:00 (CEST)
- INSEE/Postal code: 28071 /28240
- ^{1} French Land Register data, which excludes lakes, ponds, glaciers > 1 km^{2} (0.386 sq mi or 247 acres) and river estuaries.

Champrond-en-Gâtine (French pronunciation: [ʃɑ̃pʁɔ̃ ɑ̃ ɡatin]) is a commune in the Eure-et-Loir department in northern France.

== Geography ==
The Commune along with another 70 communes shares part of a 47,681 hectare, Natura 2000 conservation area, called the Forêts et étangs du Perche.

== Population ==
Historical population
Year	Pop.	±% p.a.
1968	507	—
1975	446	−1.81%
1982	430	−0.52%
1990	356	−2.33%
1999	416	+1.75%
2007	462	+1.32%
2012	582	+4.73%
2017	661	+2.58%
2023	744	+1.99%
Source: INSEE

== See also ==
- Communes of the Eure-et-Loir department
