= Trizay-Coutretot-Saint-Serge =

- Commune
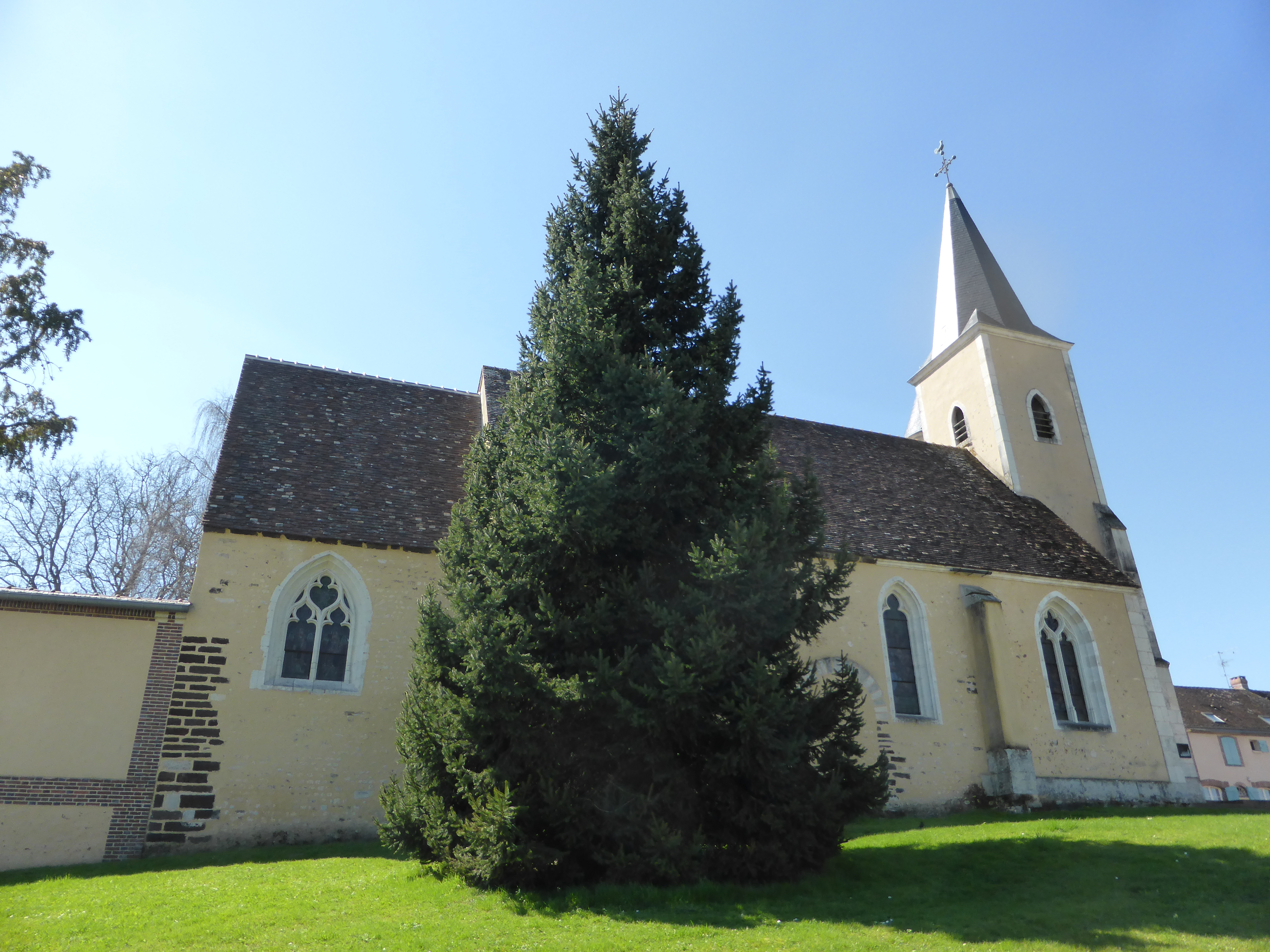
- The church in Trizay

- Coat of arms
- Location of Trizay-Coutretot-Saint-Serge
- Location within France Location within Centre-Val de Loire
- Coordinates: 48°17′36″N 0°52′05″E
- Country: France
- Region: Centre-Val de Loire
- Department: Eure-et-Loir
- Arrondissement: Nogent-le-Rotrou
- Canton: Nogent-le-Rotrou
- Intercommunality: Perche

Government
  - Mayor (2020–2026): Bertrand de Monicault
- Area^{1}: 11.15 km^{2} (4.31 sq mi)
- Elevation: 150 m (490 ft)
- Highest elevation: 230 m (750 ft)
- Lowest elevation: 125 m (410 ft)
- Population (2023): 430
  - Density: 39/km^{2} (100/sq mi)
- Time zone: UTC+01:00 (CET)
  - Summer (DST): UTC+02:00 (CEST)
- INSEE/Postal code: 28395 /28400
- ^{1} French Land Register data, which excludes lakes, ponds, glaciers > 1 km^{2} (0.386 sq mi or 247 acres) and river estuaries.

Trizay-Coutretot-Saint-Serge (French pronunciation: [tʁizɛ kutʁəto sɛ̃ sɛʁʒ]) is a commune in the Eure-et-Loir department in northern France.

== Population ==
Historical population
Year	Pop.	±% p.a.
1968	286	—
1975	326	+1.89%
1982	412	+3.40%
1990	448	+1.05%
1999	450	+0.05%
2007	466	+0.44%
2012	470	+0.17%
2017	444	−1.13%
2023	430	−0.53%
Source: INSEE

== See also ==
- Communes of the Eure-et-Loir department
