= Saint-Victor-de-Buthon =

- Commune
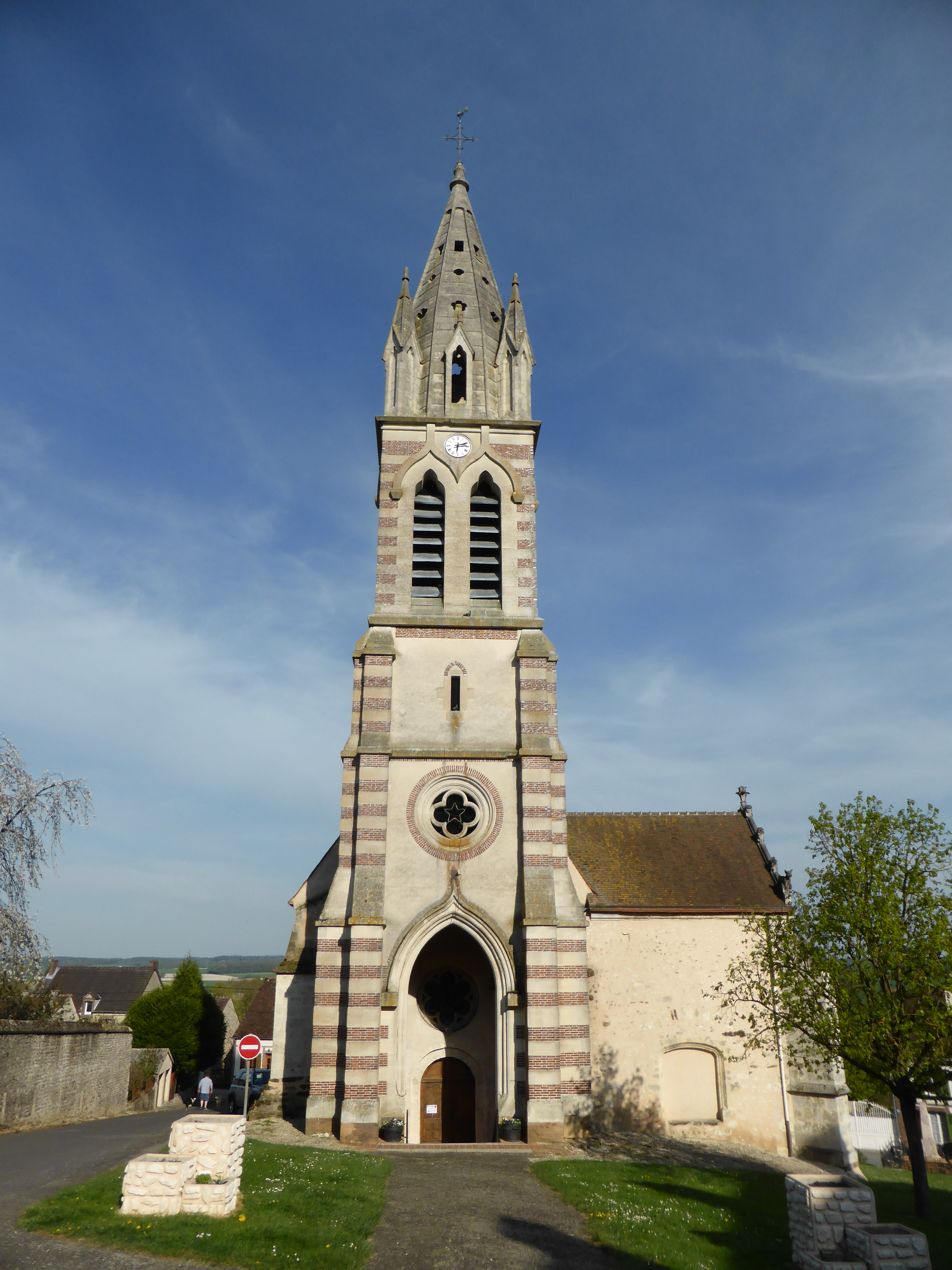
- The church in Saint-Victor-de-Buthon
- Location of Saint-Victor-de-Buthon
- Location within France Location within Centre-Val de Loire
- Coordinates: 48°24′34″N 0°58′10″E
- Country: France
- Region: Centre-Val de Loire
- Department: Eure-et-Loir
- Arrondissement: Nogent-le-Rotrou
- Canton: Nogent-le-Rotrou

Government
  - Mayor (2020–2026): Jean-Michael Cerceau
- Area^{1}: 27.72 km^{2} (10.70 sq mi)
- Elevation: 215 m (705 ft)
- Highest elevation: 274 m (899 ft)
- Lowest elevation: 153 m (502 ft)
- Population (2023): 510
  - Density: 18/km^{2} (48/sq mi)
- Time zone: UTC+01:00 (CET)
  - Summer (DST): UTC+02:00 (CEST)
- INSEE/Postal code: 28362 /28240
- ^{1} French Land Register data, which excludes lakes, ponds, glaciers > 1 km^{2} (0.386 sq mi or 247 acres) and river estuaries.

Saint-Victor-de-Buthon (French pronunciation: [sɛ̃ viktɔʁ də bytɔ̃]) is a commune in the Eure-et-Loir department in northern France.

== Geography ==
The Commune along with another 70 communes shares part of a 47,681 hectare, Natura 2000 conservation area, called the Forêts et étangs du Perche.

== Population ==
Historical population
Year	Pop.	±% p.a.
1968	555	—
1975	482	−1.99%
1982	471	−0.33%
1990	454	−0.46%
1999	461	+0.17%
2007	537	+1.93%
2012	512	−0.95%
2017	511	−0.04%
2023	510	−0.03%
Source: INSEE

== See also ==
- Communes of the Eure-et-Loir department
