= Saint-Jean-Pierre-Fixte =

- Commune
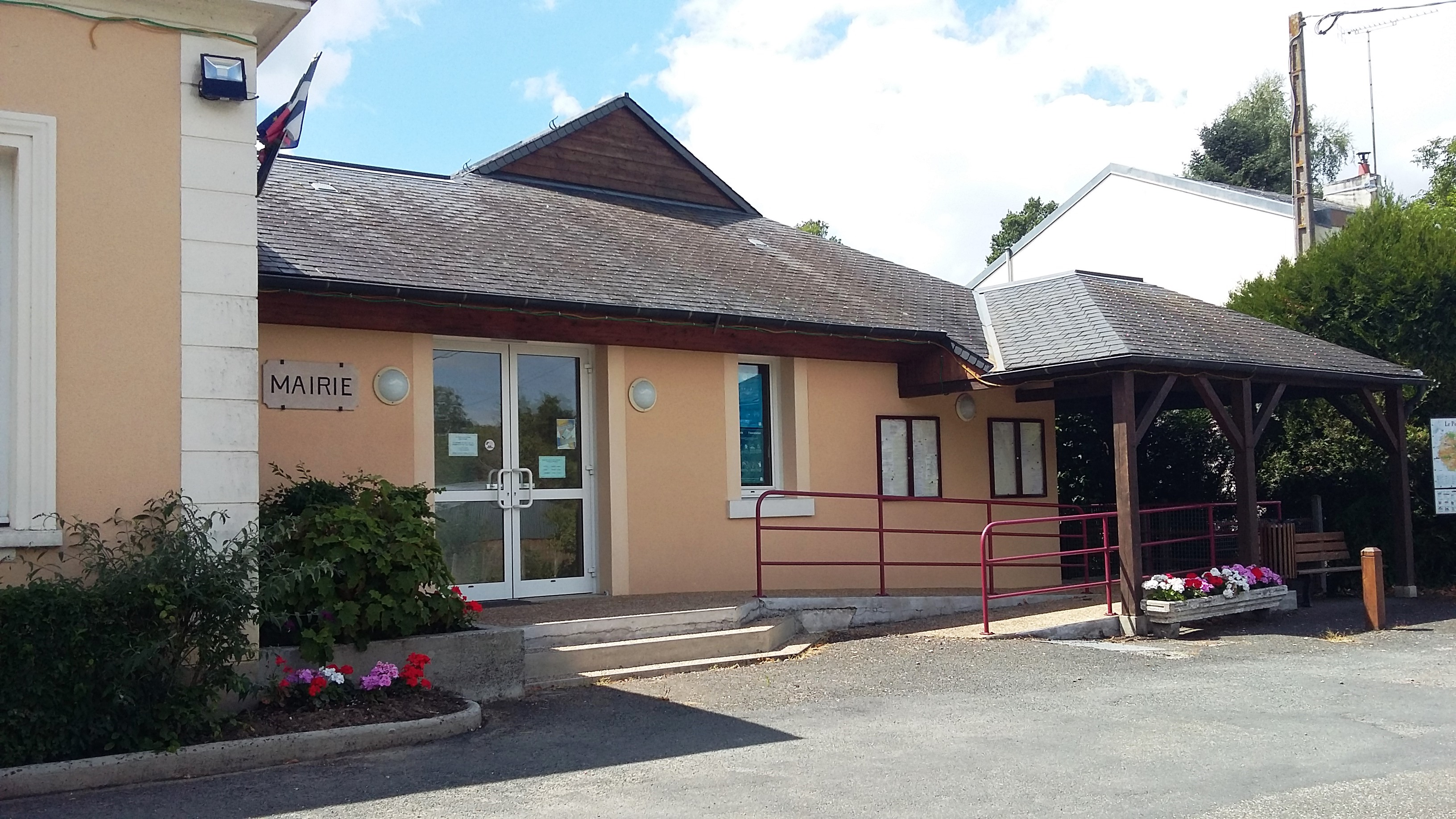
- The town hall in Saint-Jean-Pierre-Fixte

- Coat of arms
- Location of Saint-Jean-Pierre-Fixte
- Location within France Location within Centre-Val de Loire
- Coordinates: 48°17′36″N 0°50′14″E
- Country: France
- Region: Centre-Val de Loire
- Department: Eure-et-Loir
- Arrondissement: Nogent-le-Rotrou
- Canton: Nogent-le-Rotrou
- Intercommunality: Perche

Government
  - Mayor (2020–2026): Julie Rachel
- Area^{1}: 6.91 km^{2} (2.67 sq mi)
- Elevation: 127 m (417 ft)
- Highest elevation: 199 m (653 ft)
- Lowest elevation: 109 m (358 ft)
- Population (2023): 271
  - Density: 39.2/km^{2} (102/sq mi)
- Time zone: UTC+01:00 (CET)
  - Summer (DST): UTC+02:00 (CEST)
- INSEE/Postal code: 28342 /28400
- ^{1} French Land Register data, which excludes lakes, ponds, glaciers > 1 km^{2} (0.386 sq mi or 247 acres) and river estuaries.

Saint-Jean-Pierre-Fixte is a commune in the Eure-et-Loir department in northern France.

== Population ==
Historical population
Year	Pop.	±% p.a.
1968	145	—
1975	180	+3.14%
1982	210	+2.23%
1990	307	+4.86%
1999	291	−0.59%
2007	286	−0.22%
2012	284	−0.14%
2017	259	−1.83%
2023	271	+0.76%
Source: INSEE

== See also ==
- Communes of the Eure-et-Loir department
