= Marolles-les-Buis =

- Commune
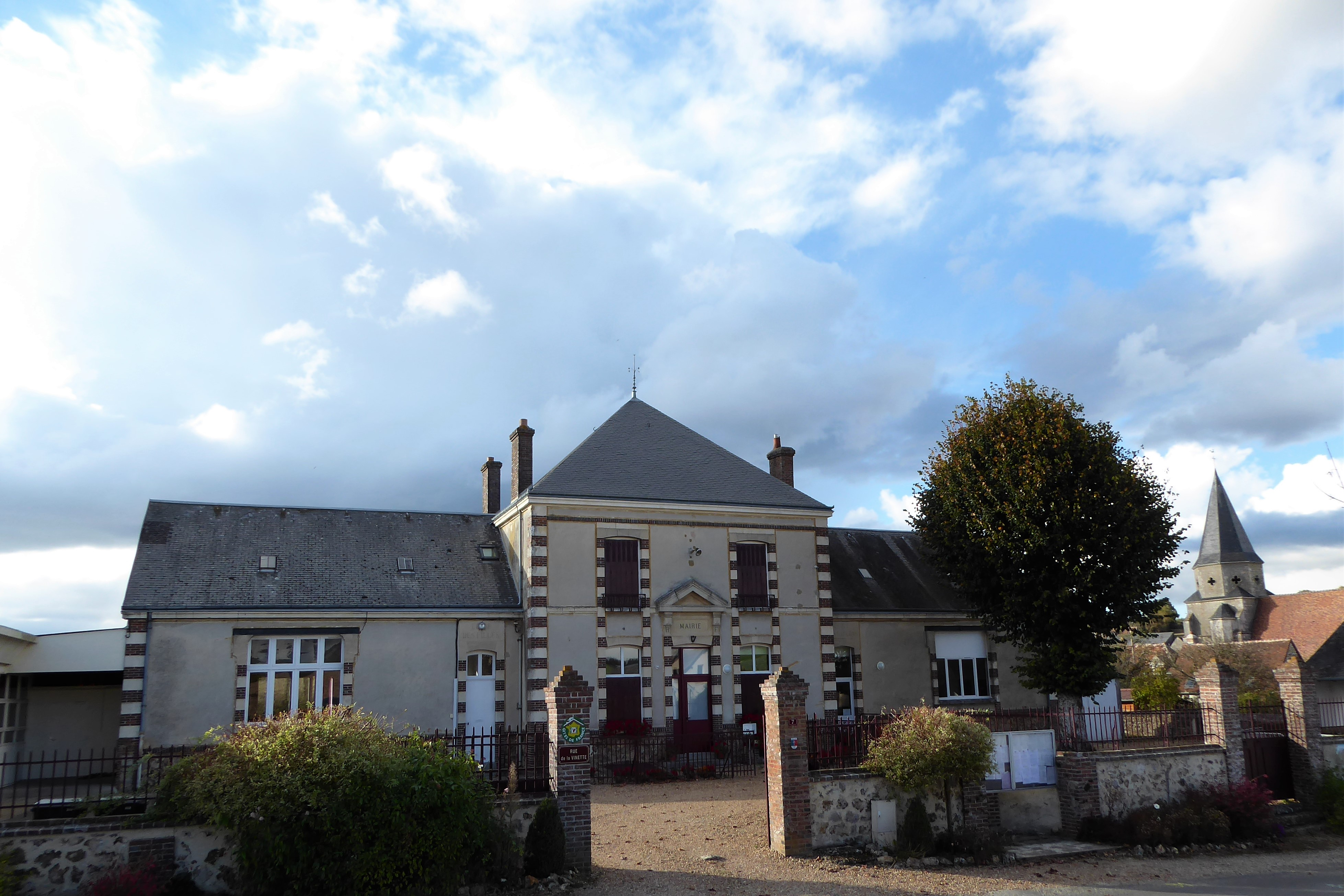
- The town hall in Marolles-les-Buis

- Coat of arms
- Location of Marolles-les-Buis
- Location within France Location within Centre-Val de Loire
- Coordinates: 48°21′43″N 0°55′43″E
- Country: France
- Region: Centre-Val de Loire
- Department: Eure-et-Loir
- Arrondissement: Nogent-le-Rotrou
- Canton: Nogent-le-Rotrou

Government
  - Mayor (2020–2026): Martial Lecomte
- Area^{1}: 13.08 km^{2} (5.05 sq mi)
- Elevation: 175 m (574 ft)
- Highest elevation: 267 m (876 ft)
- Lowest elevation: 137 m (449 ft)
- Population (2023): 205
  - Density: 15.7/km^{2} (40.6/sq mi)
- Time zone: UTC+01:00 (CET)
  - Summer (DST): UTC+02:00 (CEST)
- INSEE/Postal code: 28237 /28400
- ^{1} French Land Register data, which excludes lakes, ponds, glaciers > 1 km^{2} (0.386 sq mi or 247 acres) and river estuaries.

Marolles-les-Buis (French pronunciation: [maʁɔl le bɥi]) is a commune in the Eure-et-Loir department in northern France.

== Population ==
Historical population
Year	Pop.	±% p.a.
1968	240	—
1975	261	+1.21%
1982	227	−1.97%
1990	227	+0.00%
1999	211	−0.81%
2007	264	+2.84%
2012	238	−2.05%
2017	212	−2.29%
2023	205	−0.56%
Source: INSEE

== See also ==
- Communes of the Eure-et-Loir department
