= Meaucé =

- Commune
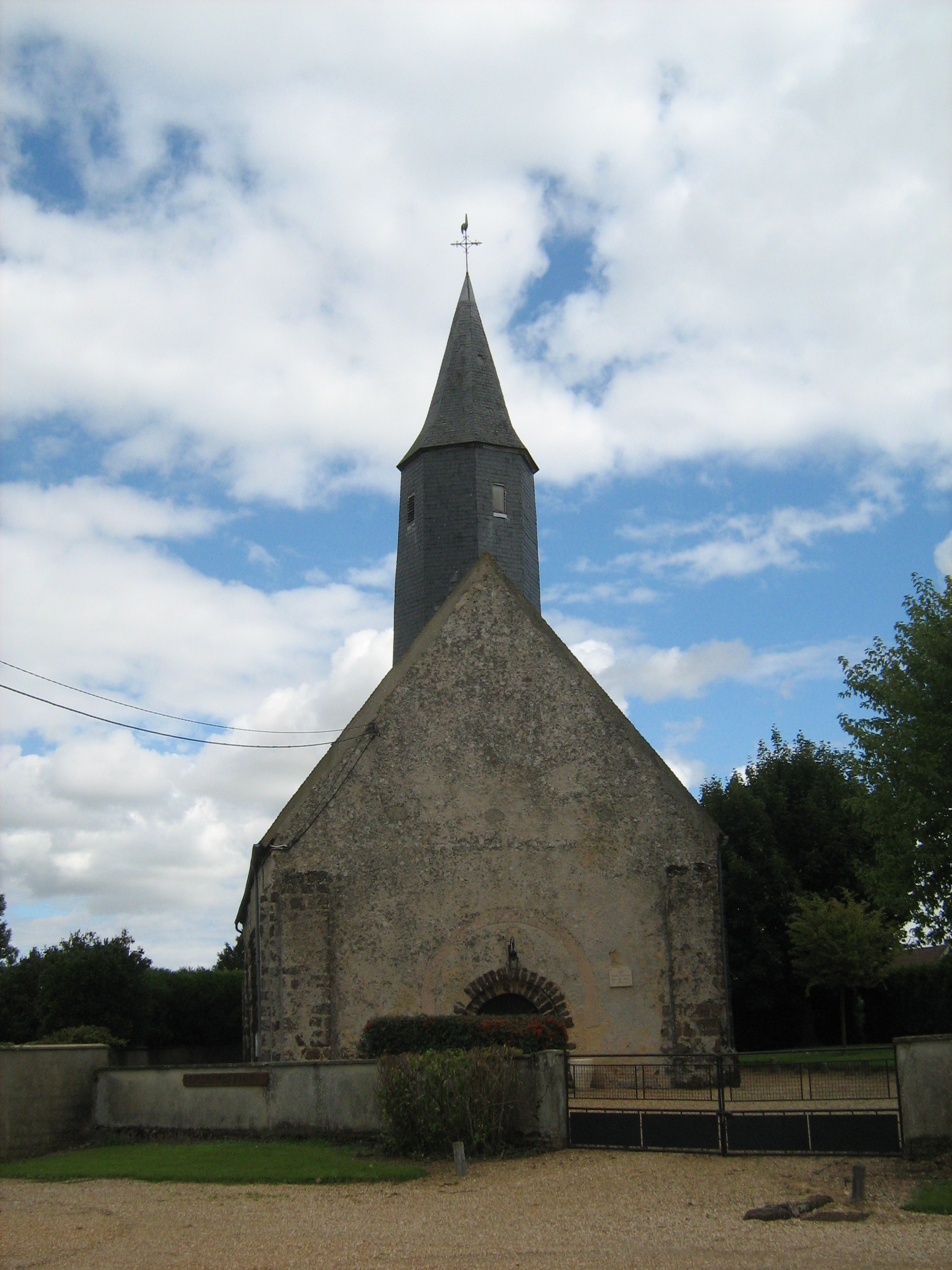
- The church of Saint-Jean of Murgers in Meaucé
- Location of Meaucé
- Location within France Location within Centre-Val de Loire
- Coordinates: 48°29′11″N 1°00′09″E
- Country: France
- Region: Centre-Val de Loire
- Department: Eure-et-Loir
- Arrondissement: Nogent-le-Rotrou
- Canton: Nogent-le-Rotrou

Government
  - Mayor (2020–2026): Michel Bizard
- Area^{1}: 11.33 km^{2} (4.37 sq mi)
- Elevation: 205 m (673 ft)
- Highest elevation: 219 m (719 ft)
- Lowest elevation: 189 m (620 ft)
- Population (2023): 501
  - Density: 44.2/km^{2} (115/sq mi)
- Time zone: UTC+01:00 (CET)
  - Summer (DST): UTC+02:00 (CEST)
- INSEE/Postal code: 28240 /28240
- ^{1} French Land Register data, which excludes lakes, ponds, glaciers > 1 km^{2} (0.386 sq mi or 247 acres) and river estuaries.

Meaucé (French pronunciation: [mose]) is a commune in the Eure-et-Loir department in northern France.

== Population ==
Historical population
Year	Pop.	±% p.a.
1968	313	—
1975	321	+0.36%
1982	401	+3.23%
1990	585	+4.83%
1999	526	−1.17%
2007	515	−0.26%
2012	522	+0.27%
2017	543	+0.79%
2023	501	−1.33%
Source: INSEE

== See also ==
- Communes of the Eure-et-Loir department
