= La Croix-du-Perche =

- Commune
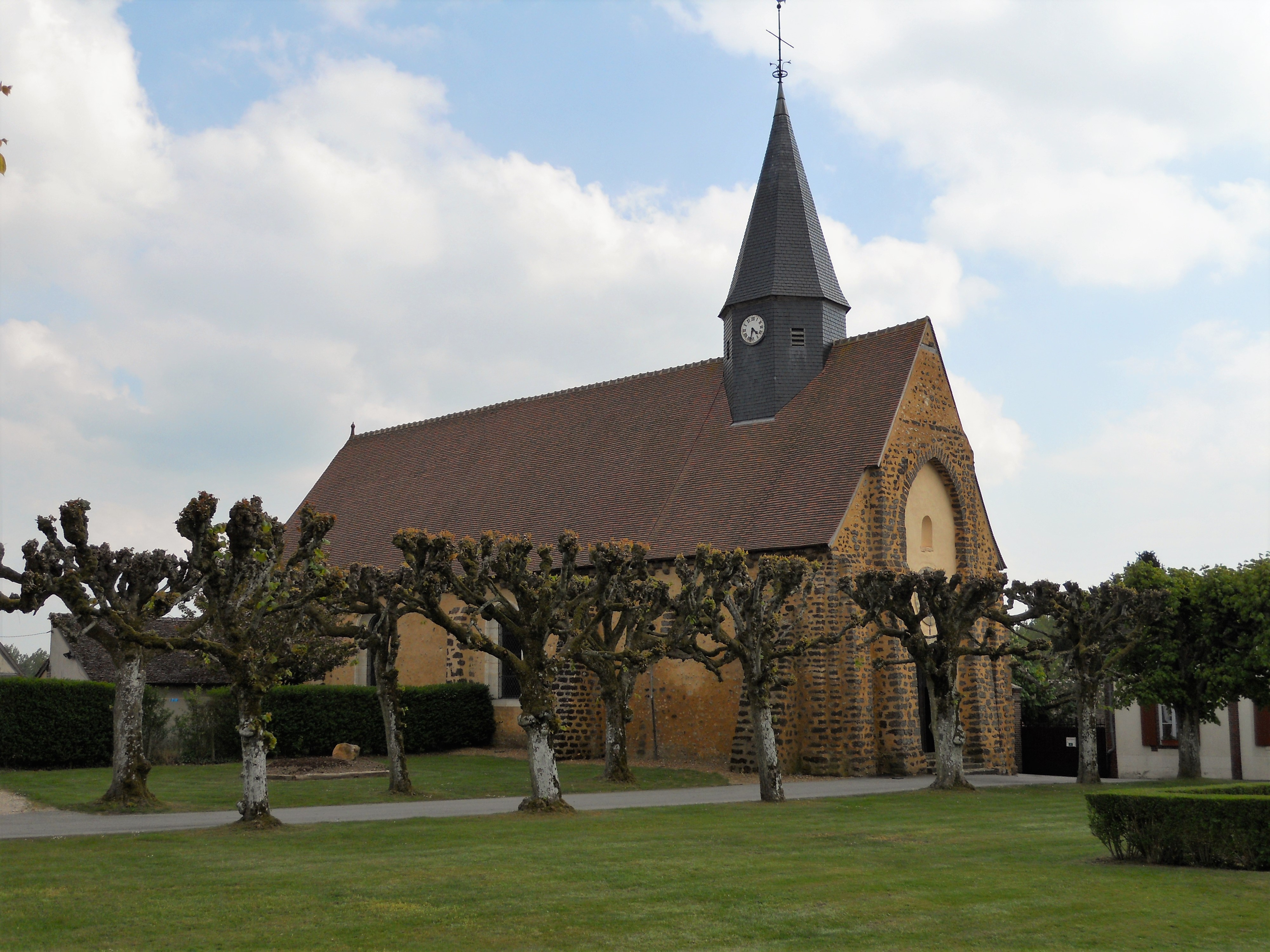
- The church in La Croix-du-Perche
- Location of La Croix-du-Perche
- Location within France Location within Centre-Val de Loire
- Coordinates: 48°16′32″N 1°02′59″E
- Country: France
- Region: Centre-Val de Loire
- Department: Eure-et-Loir
- Arrondissement: Nogent-le-Rotrou
- Canton: Nogent-le-Rotrou
- Intercommunality: Terres de Perche

Government
  - Mayor (2020–2026): Marie-Line Filoche
- Area^{1}: 12.5 km^{2} (4.8 sq mi)
- Elevation: 220 m (720 ft)
- Highest elevation: 260 m (850 ft)
- Lowest elevation: 189 m (620 ft)
- Population (2023): 147
  - Density: 11.8/km^{2} (30.5/sq mi)
- Time zone: UTC+01:00 (CET)
  - Summer (DST): UTC+02:00 (CEST)
- INSEE/Postal code: 28119 /28480
- ^{1} French Land Register data, which excludes lakes, ponds, glaciers > 1 km^{2} (0.386 sq mi or 247 acres) and river estuaries.

La Croix-du-Perche (French pronunciation: [la kʁwa dy pɛʁʃ], literally La Croix of the Perche) is a commune in the Eure-et-Loir department in northern France.

== Population ==
Historical population
Year	Pop.	±% p.a.
1968	235	—
1975	190	−2.99%
1982	208	+1.30%
1990	203	−0.30%
1999	163	−2.41%
2007	202	+2.72%
2012	201	−0.10%
2017	163	−4.10%
2023	147	−1.71%
Source: INSEE

== See also ==
- Communes of the Eure-et-Loir department
