= François Lamy (theologian) =

French Benedictine theologian and writer

François Lamy (French pronunciation: [fʁɑ̃swa lami]; 1636 – 11 April 1711) was a French Benedictine ascetical and apologetic writer, of the Congregation of St-Maur.

== Life ==
Lamy was born at Montireau in the Department of Eure-et-Loir in 1636. While fighting a duel, he was saved from a fatal sword-thrust by a book of the Rule of St. Benedict which he carried in his pocket. Seeing the finger of God in this, he took the Benedictine habit at the monastery of St-Remi at Reims in 1658. Shortly after his elevation to the priesthood he was appointed subprior of St-Faron at Meaux, but a year later resigned this position.

During 1672-75, he taught philosophy at the monasteries of Mont St-Quentin and St-Médard in Soissons. He was the first of the Maurists to teach the Cartesian system of philosophy.

In 1676, he came to St-Germain-des-Prés near Paris where he taught theology until 1679. The general chapter of 1687 appointed him prior of Rebais in the Diocese of Meaux, but he was ordered by the king to resign his office in 1689. The remainder of his life he spent in literary pursuits at the Abbey of St-Denis near Paris, where he died.

== Works ==
He was one of the most famous writers of his times and was an intimate friend of Bossuet. Of his twenty printed works the following are the most important:

- "Vérité évidente de la Religion chrétienne" (Paris, 1694)
- "Le Nouvel Athéisme Renversé, ou réfutation du système de Spinoza" (Paris, 1696; 2nd ed., Brussels, 1711)
- "Sentiments de piété sur la profession religieuse" (Paris, 1697)
- "De la Connaissance de soi-même" (5 vols., Paris, 1694-8; 2nd ed., 1700), which raised a controversy between the author and Malebranche concerning the disinterested love of God
- "Lettre d'un théologien à un de ses amis" (Paris, 1699)
- "Plainte de l'apologiste des Bénédictins à MM. les prélats de France" (Paris, 1699)
- "L'incrédule amené à la Religion par la Raison" (Paris, 1710)
- "De la Connaissance et de l'Amour de Dieu" (Paris, 1712)

In the last two treatises the author defends the Maurist edition of the works of Augustine of Hippo against the Jansenists and the Jesuits.
