= Argenvilliers =

- Commune
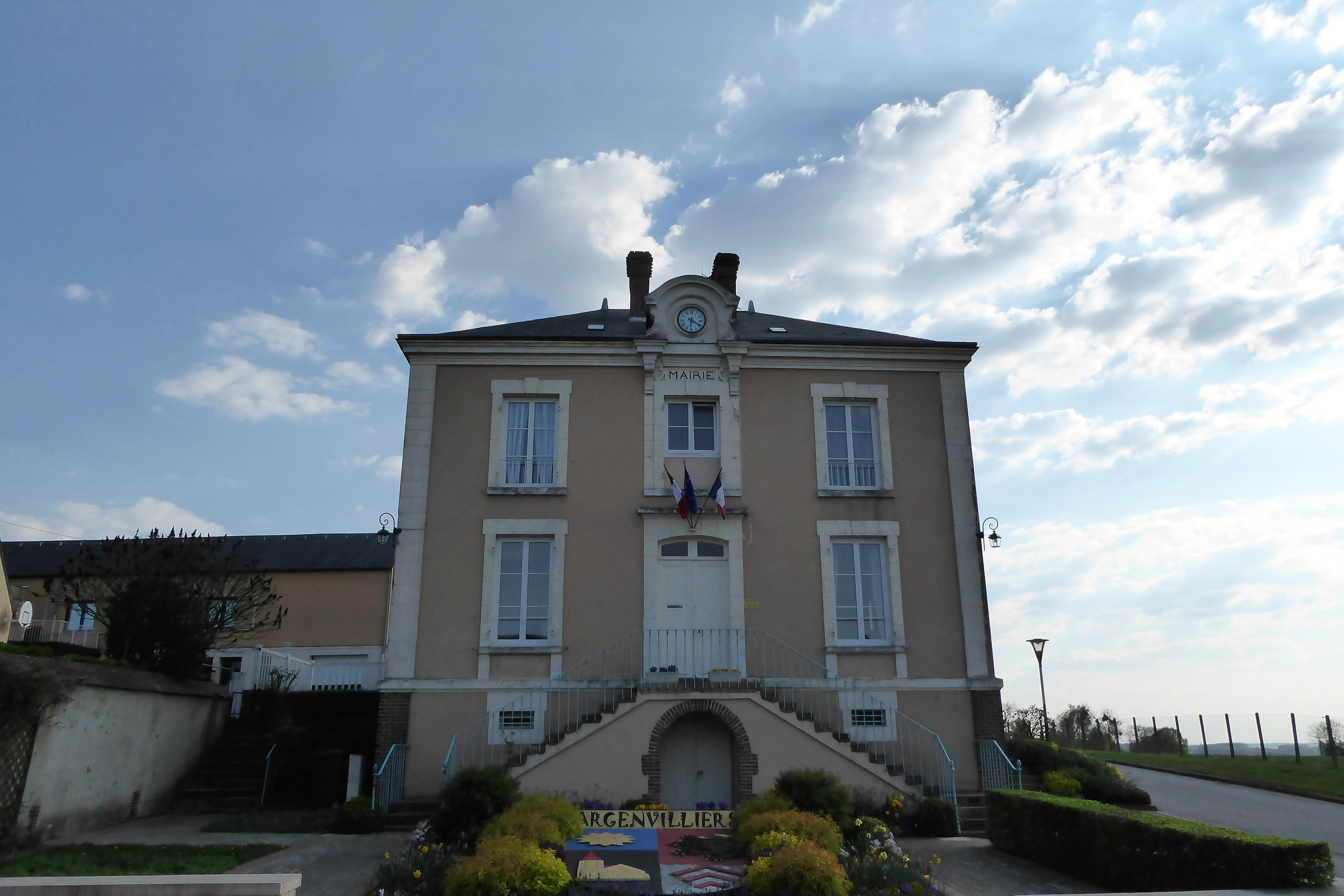
- The town hall in Argenvilliers

- Coat of arms
- Location of Argenvilliers
- Location within France Location within Centre-Val de Loire
- Coordinates: 48°15′42″N 0°57′29″E
- Country: France
- Region: Centre-Val de Loire
- Department: Eure-et-Loir
- Arrondissement: Nogent-le-Rotrou
- Canton: Nogent-le-Rotrou
- Intercommunality: CC Perche

Government
  - Mayor (2020–2026): Pascal Mellinger
- Area^{1}: 18.35 km^{2} (7.08 sq mi)
- Elevation: 270 m (890 ft)
- Highest elevation: 283 m (928 ft)
- Lowest elevation: 173 m (568 ft)
- Population (2023): 310
  - Density: 17/km^{2} (44/sq mi)
- Time zone: UTC+01:00 (CET)
  - Summer (DST): UTC+02:00 (CEST)
- INSEE/Postal code: 28010 /28480
- ^{1} French Land Register data, which excludes lakes, ponds, glaciers > 1 km^{2} (0.386 sq mi or 247 acres) and river estuaries.

Argenvilliers (French pronunciation: [aʁʒɑ̃vilje]) is a commune in the Eure-et-Loir department in northern France.

== Population ==
Historical population
Year	Pop.	±% p.a.
1968	388	—
1975	363	−0.95%
1982	330	−1.35%
1990	301	−1.14%
1999	333	+1.13%
2007	367	+1.22%
2012	360	−0.38%
2017	332	−1.61%
2023	310	−1.14%
Source: INSEE

== See also ==
- Communes of the Eure-et-Loir department
