= Nonvilliers-Grandhoux =

- Commune
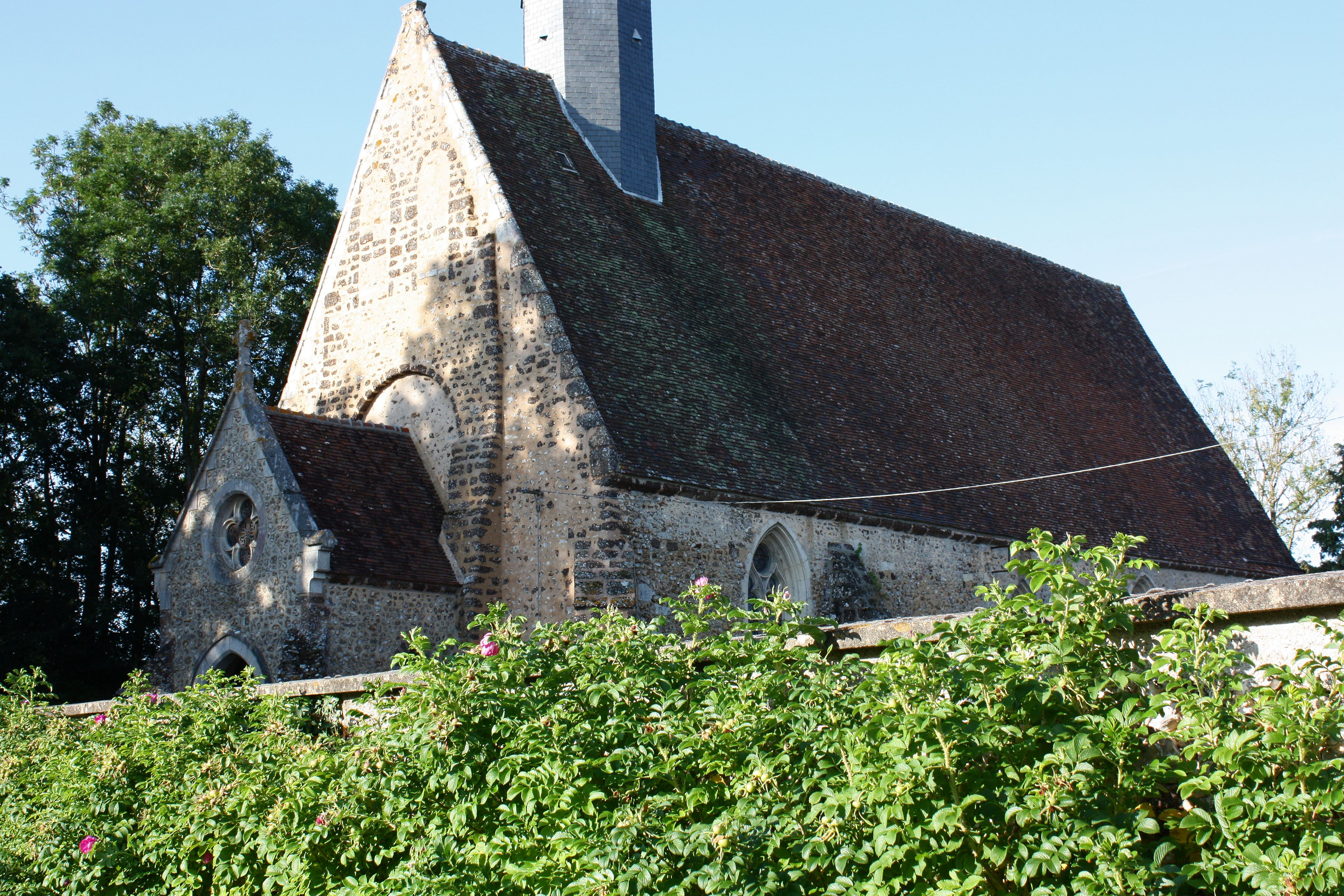
- The church in Nonvilliers
- Location of Nonvilliers-Grandhoux
- Location within France Location within Centre-Val de Loire
- Coordinates: 48°20′36″N 1°10′24″E
- Country: France
- Region: Centre-Val de Loire
- Department: Eure-et-Loir
- Arrondissement: Nogent-le-Rotrou
- Canton: Nogent-le-Rotrou

Government
  - Mayor (2020–2026): Monique Hervet
- Area^{1}: 21.61 km^{2} (8.34 sq mi)
- Elevation: 150 m (490 ft)
- Highest elevation: 256 m (840 ft)
- Lowest elevation: 165 m (541 ft)
- Population (2023): 429
  - Density: 19.9/km^{2} (51.4/sq mi)
- Time zone: UTC+01:00 (CET)
  - Summer (DST): UTC+02:00 (CEST)
- INSEE/Postal code: 28282 /28120
- ^{1} French Land Register data, which excludes lakes, ponds, glaciers > 1 km^{2} (0.386 sq mi or 247 acres) and river estuaries.

Nonvilliers-Grandhoux (French pronunciation: [nɔ̃vilje ɡʁɑ̃du]) is a commune in the Eure-et-Loir department in northern France.

== Geography ==
The Commune along with another 70 communes shares part of a 47,681 hectare, Natura 2000 conservation area, called the Forêts et étangs du Perche.

== Population ==
Historical population
Year	Pop.	±% p.a.
1968	341	—
1975	310	−1.35%
1982	309	−0.05%
1990	315	+0.24%
1999	316	+0.04%
2007	397	+2.89%
2012	426	+1.42%
2017	427	+0.05%
2023	429	+0.08%
Source: INSEE

== See also ==
- Communes of the Eure-et-Loir department
