= Champrond-en-Perchet =

- Commune
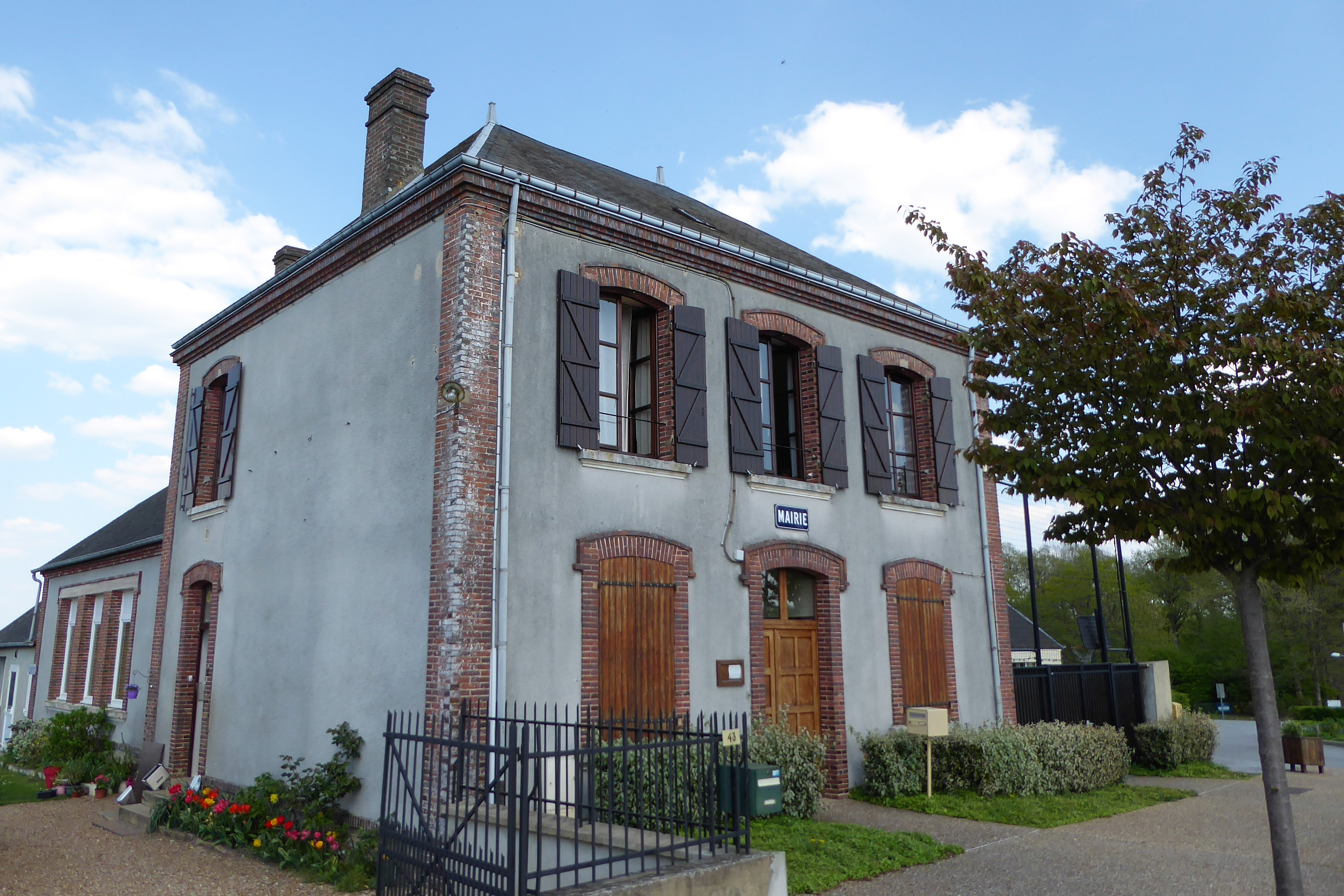
- The town hall in Champrond-en-Perchet
- Location of Champrond-en-Perchet
- Location within France Location within Centre-Val de Loire
- Coordinates: 48°18′41″N 0°52′09″E
- Country: France
- Region: Centre-Val de Loire
- Department: Eure-et-Loir
- Arrondissement: Nogent-le-Rotrou
- Canton: Nogent-le-Rotrou
- Intercommunality: Perche

Government
  - Mayor (2020–2026): Jean-Claude Chevee
- Area^{1}: 9.02 km^{2} (3.48 sq mi)
- Elevation: 204 m (669 ft)
- Highest elevation: 236 m (774 ft)
- Lowest elevation: 145 m (476 ft)
- Population (2023): 388
  - Density: 43.0/km^{2} (111/sq mi)
- Time zone: UTC+01:00 (CET)
  - Summer (DST): UTC+02:00 (CEST)
- INSEE/Postal code: 28072 /28400
- ^{1} French Land Register data, which excludes lakes, ponds, glaciers > 1 km^{2} (0.386 sq mi or 247 acres) and river estuaries.

Champrond-en-Perchet is a commune in the Eure-et-Loir department in northern France.

== Population ==
Historical population
Year	Pop.	±% p.a.
1968	151	—
1975	285	+9.50%
1982	440	+6.40%
1990	456	+0.45%
1999	397	−1.53%
2007	408	+0.34%
2012	397	−0.55%
2017	405	+0.40%
2023	388	−0.71%
Source: INSEE

== See also ==
- Communes of the Eure-et-Loir department
