= La Loupe =

- Commune
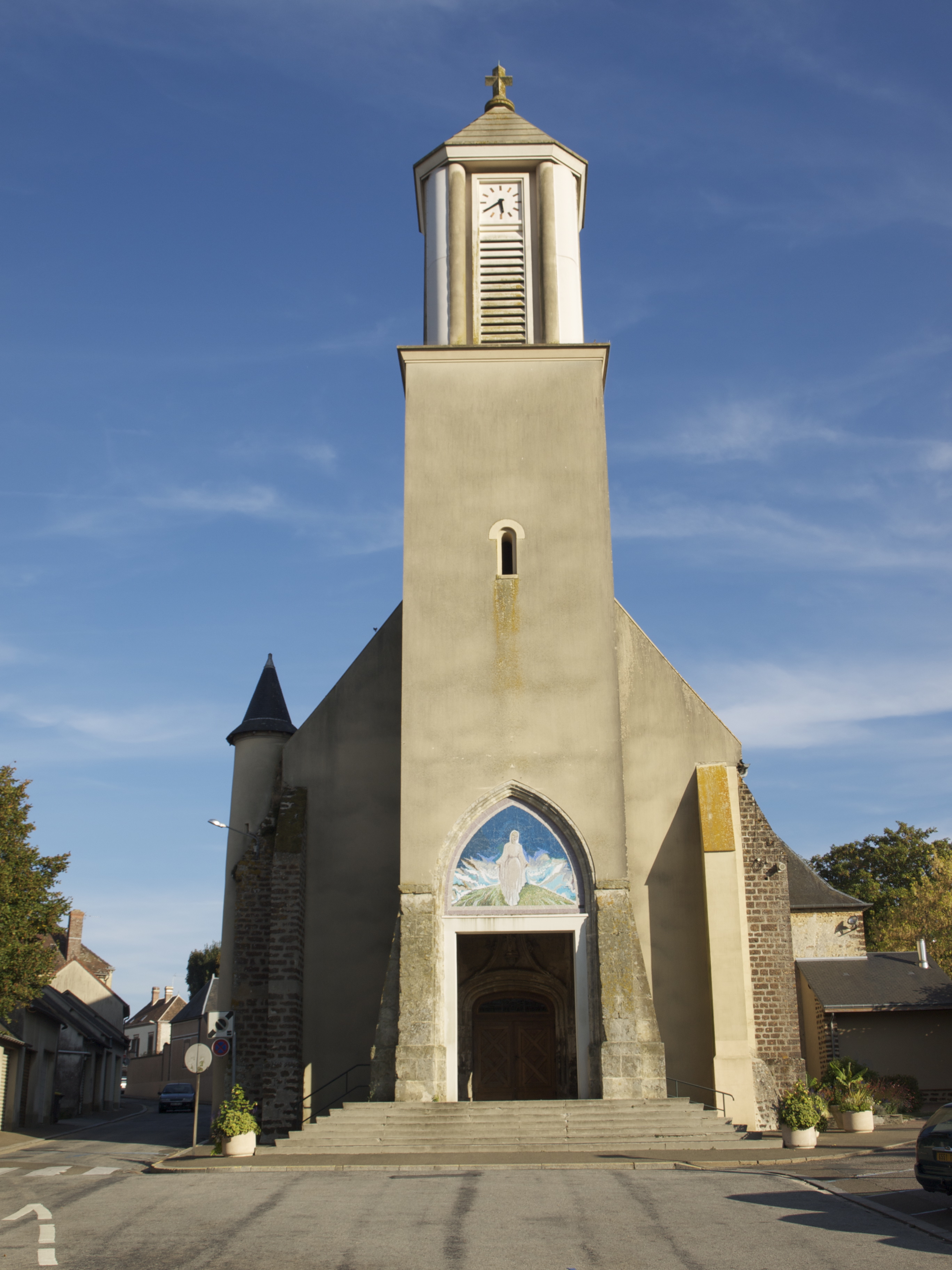
- The church in La Loupe

- Coat of arms
- Location of La Loupe
- Location within France Location within Centre-Val de Loire
- Coordinates: 48°28′21″N 1°00′57″E
- Country: France
- Region: Centre-Val de Loire
- Department: Eure-et-Loir
- Arrondissement: Nogent-le-Rotrou
- Canton: Nogent-le-Rotrou

Government
  - Mayor (2020–2026): Eric Gérard
- Area^{1}: 7.27 km^{2} (2.81 sq mi)
- Highest elevation: 243 m (797 ft)
- Lowest elevation: 192 m (630 ft)
- Population (2023): 3,191
  - Density: 439/km^{2} (1,140/sq mi)
- Time zone: UTC+01:00 (CET)
  - Summer (DST): UTC+02:00 (CEST)
- INSEE/Postal code: 28214 /28240
- ^{1} French Land Register data, which excludes lakes, ponds, glaciers > 1 km^{2} (0.386 sq mi or 247 acres) and river estuaries.

La Loupe is a commune in the Eure-et-Loir department in northern France.

== Population ==
Historical population
Year	Pop.	±% p.a.
1968	3,510	—
1975	3,719	+0.83%
1982	3,693	−0.10%
1990	3,820	+0.42%
1999	3,734	−0.25%
2007	3,474	−0.90%
2012	3,515	+0.23%
2017	3,342	−1.00%
2023	3,191	−0.77%
Source: INSEE

== Sister city ==
- Pfalzgrafenweiler, Germany
- Royston in Hertfordshire, England

== See also ==
- Communes of the Eure-et-Loir department
- Perche
