= Forêts et étangs du Perche =

Protected area in France

Forêts et étangs du Perche translated as 'the Forest and ponds of Perche' is a Natura 2000 conservation area that is 47,681 hectares in size.

== Geography ==
The area is a vast ecocomplex with a strong dominance of forest habitats, but also containing moors and numerous wetlands: ponds, megaphorbiaies, peat bogs, wet meadows.

It is spread across 71 different communes all within the departments of the Orne and Eure-et-Loir;

1. Ardelles
2. Les Aspres
3. Belforêt-en-Perche
4. Belhomert-Guéhouville
5. Bellavilliers
6. Bizou
7. Bonsmoulins
8. Bretoncelles
9. Champrond-en-Gâtine
10. La Chapelle-Fortin
11. La Chapelle-Montligeon
12. Charencey
13. Chuisnes
14. Châteauneuf-en-Thymerais
15. Corbon
16. Les Corvées-les-Yys
17. Cour-Maugis sur Huisne
18. Crulai
19. Digny
20. Le Favril
21. Feings
22. La Ferté-Vidame
23. Fontaine-Simon
24. Fontaine-les-Ribouts
25. La Framboisière
26. Friaize
27. Les Genettes
28. Happonvilliers
29. L'Hôme-Chamondot
30. Irai
31. Jaudrais
32. Lamblore
33. Landelles
34. Longny les Villages
35. Louvilliers-lès-Perche
36. La Madeleine-Bouvet
37. Le Mage
38. Maillebois
39. La Mancelière
40. Manou
41. Mauves-sur-Huisne
42. Montireau
43. Montlandon
44. Moutiers-au-Perche
45. Nonvilliers-Grandhoux
46. Perche en Nocé
47. Pontgouin
48. La Puisaye
49. Rémalard en Perche
50. Les Ressuintes
51. Saint-Ange-et-Torçay
52. Saint-Aquilin-de-Corbion
53. Saint-Denis-des-Puits
54. Saint-Germain-des-Grois
55. Saint-Jean-de-Rebervilliers
56. Saint-Maixme-Hauterive
57. Saint-Mard-de-Réno
58. Saint-Martin-du-Vieux-Bellême
59. Saint-Maurice-Saint-Germain
60. Saint-Sauveur-Marville
61. Saint-Victor-de-Buthon
62. Saint-Éliph
63. Sainte-Céronne-lès-Mortagne
64. Saintigny
65. La Saucelle
66. Senonches
67. Soligny-la-Trappe
68. Le Thieulin
69. Thimert-Gâtelles
70. Tourouvre au Perche
71. La Ventrouze

Some parts of this Natura 2000 site are within the Parc naturel régional du Perche

== Conservation ==
The conservation area has twenty-three species listed in Annex 2 of the Habitats Directive;

1. Common kingfisher
2. Northern shoveler
3. Eurasian teal
4. Common pochard
5. Tufted duck
6. European nightjar
7. Black stork
8. Hen harrier
9. Middle spotted woodpecker
10. Black woodpecker
11. Merlin
12. Common crane
13. Red-backed shrike
14. Woodlark
15. Common merganser
16. Osprey
17. European honey buzzard
18. Grey-headed woodpecker
19. European golden plover
20. Great crested grebe
21. Black-necked grebe
22. Water rail
23. Eurasian woodcock
