= Vaupillon =

- Commune
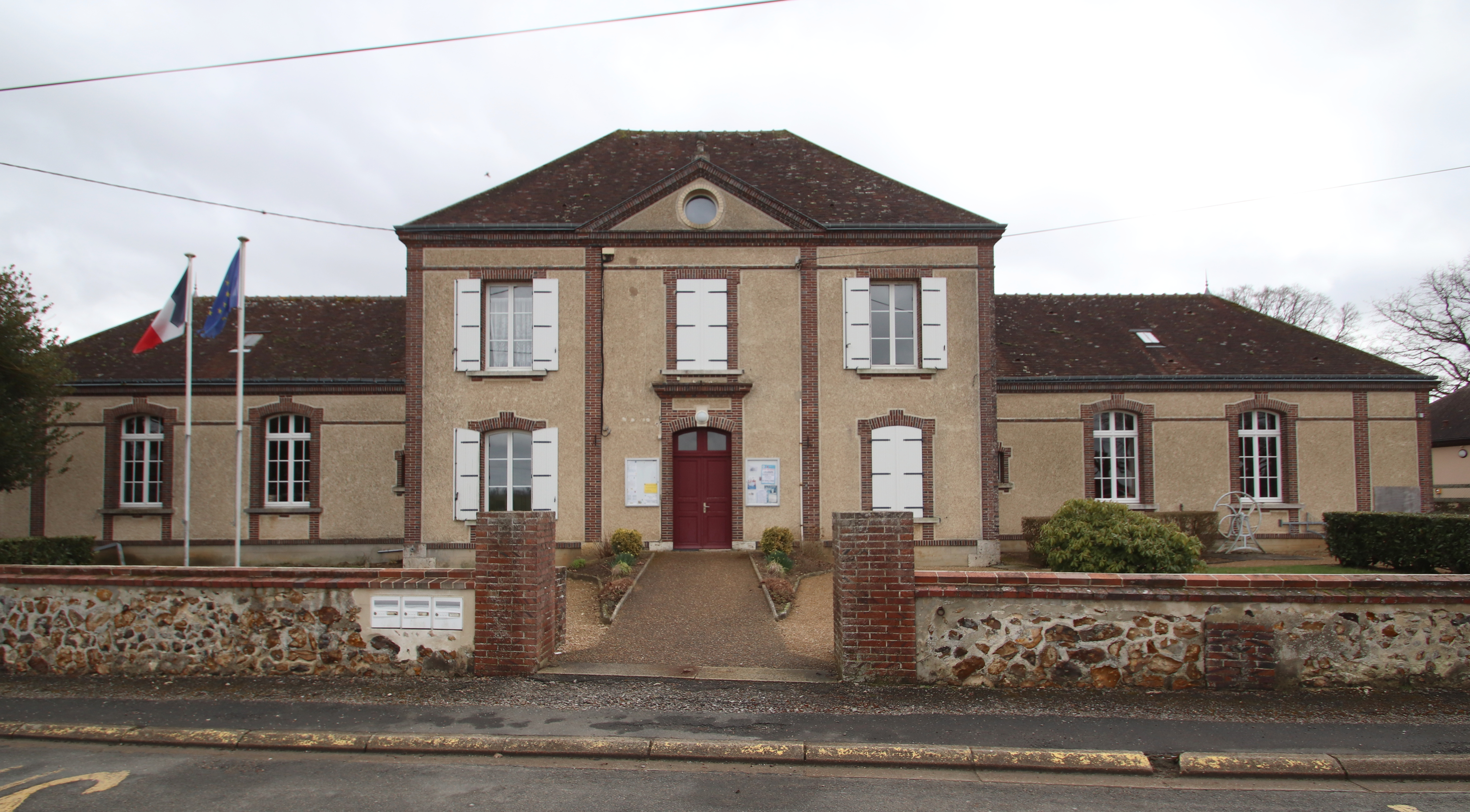
- The town hall in Vaupillon
- Location of Vaupillon
- Location within France Location within Centre-Val de Loire
- Coordinates: 48°27′40″N 0°59′45″E
- Country: France
- Region: Centre-Val de Loire
- Department: Eure-et-Loir
- Arrondissement: Nogent-le-Rotrou
- Canton: Nogent-le-Rotrou

Government
  - Mayor (2020–2026): Cornelia Obe
- Area^{1}: 12.47 km^{2} (4.81 sq mi)
- Elevation: 210 m (690 ft)
- Highest elevation: 219 m (719 ft)
- Lowest elevation: 174 m (571 ft)
- Population (2023): 466
  - Density: 37.4/km^{2} (96.8/sq mi)
- Time zone: UTC+01:00 (CET)
  - Summer (DST): UTC+02:00 (CEST)
- INSEE/Postal code: 28401 /28240
- ^{1} French Land Register data, which excludes lakes, ponds, glaciers > 1 km^{2} (0.386 sq mi or 247 acres) and river estuaries.

Vaupillon (French pronunciation: [vopijɔ̃]) is a commune in the Eure-et-Loir department in northern France.

== Population ==
Historical population
Year	Pop.	±% p.a.
1968	439	—
1975	375	−2.23%
1982	375	+0.00%
1990	374	−0.03%
1999	394	+0.58%
2007	470	+2.23%
2012	452	−0.78%
2017	456	+0.18%
2023	466	+0.36%
Source: INSEE

== See also ==
- Communes of the Eure-et-Loir department
