= Happonvilliers =

- Commune
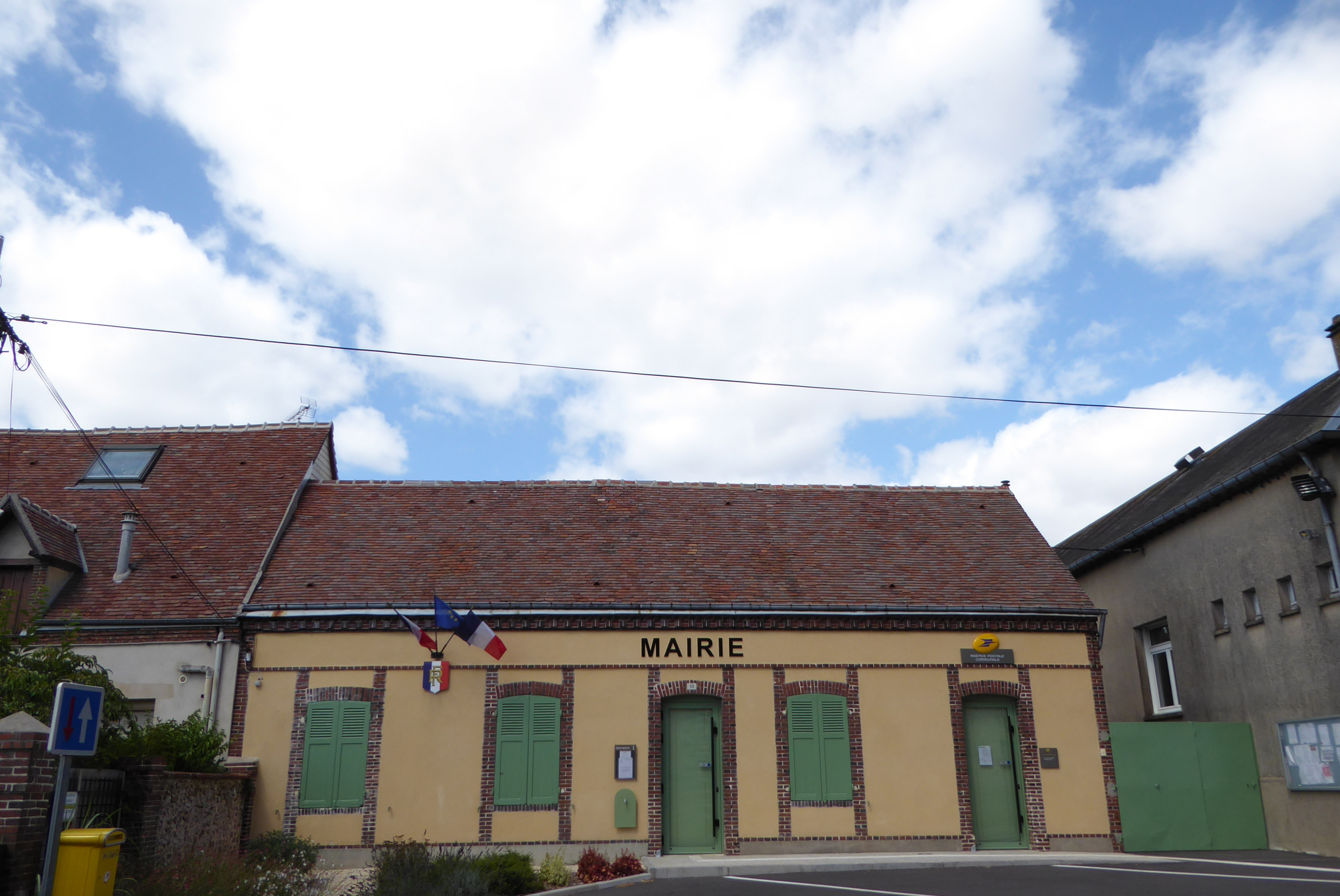
- The town hall in Happonvilliers
- Location of Happonvilliers
- Location within France Location within Centre-Val de Loire
- Coordinates: 48°19′33″N 1°06′44″E
- Country: France
- Region: Centre-Val de Loire
- Department: Eure-et-Loir
- Arrondissement: Nogent-le-Rotrou
- Canton: Nogent-le-Rotrou

Government
  - Mayor (2020–2026): Denise Huillery
- Area^{1}: 18.96 km^{2} (7.32 sq mi)
- Elevation: 218 m (715 ft)
- Highest elevation: 256 m (840 ft)
- Lowest elevation: 183 m (600 ft)
- Population (2023): 296
  - Density: 15.6/km^{2} (40.4/sq mi)
- Time zone: UTC+01:00 (CET)
  - Summer (DST): UTC+02:00 (CEST)
- INSEE/Postal code: 28192 /28480
- ^{1} French Land Register data, which excludes lakes, ponds, glaciers > 1 km^{2} (0.386 sq mi or 247 acres) and river estuaries.

Happonvilliers (French pronunciation: [apɔ̃vilje]) is a commune in the Eure-et-Loir department in northern France.

== Geography ==
The Commune along with another 70 communes shares part of a 47,681 hectare, Natura 2000 conservation area, called the Forêts et étangs du Perche.

== Population ==
Historical population
Year	Pop.	±% p.a.
1968	282	—
1975	240	−2.28%
1982	235	−0.30%
1990	235	+0.00%
1999	267	+1.43%
2007	304	+1.64%
2012	303	−0.07%
2017	307	+0.26%
2023	296	−0.61%
Source: INSEE

== See also ==
- Communes of the Eure-et-Loir department
