= Montireau =

- Commune
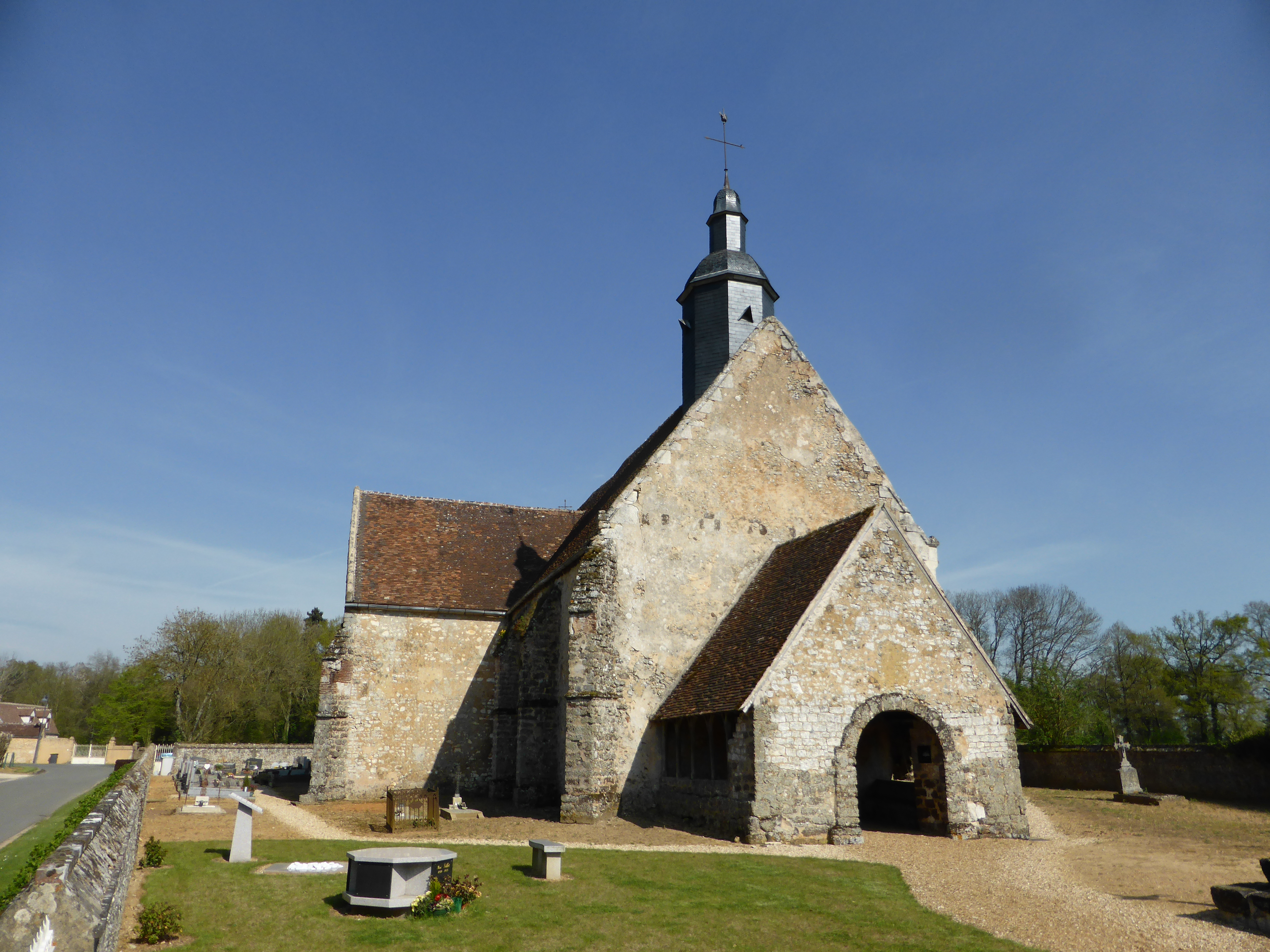
- The church in Montireau
- Location of Montireau
- Location within France Location within Centre-Val de Loire
- Coordinates: 48°24′32″N 1°01′38″E
- Country: France
- Region: Centre-Val de Loire
- Department: Eure-et-Loir
- Arrondissement: Nogent-le-Rotrou
- Canton: Nogent-le-Rotrou
- Intercommunality: Terres de Perche

Government
  - Mayor (2020–2026): Jacques Henry
- Area^{1}: 10.1 km^{2} (3.9 sq mi)
- Elevation: 260 m (850 ft)
- Highest elevation: 282 m (925 ft)
- Lowest elevation: 217 m (712 ft)
- Population (2023): 136
  - Density: 13.5/km^{2} (34.9/sq mi)
- Time zone: UTC+01:00 (CET)
  - Summer (DST): UTC+02:00 (CEST)
- INSEE/Postal code: 28264 /28240
- ^{1} French Land Register data, which excludes lakes, ponds, glaciers > 1 km^{2} (0.386 sq mi or 247 acres) and river estuaries.

Montireau (French pronunciation: [mɔ̃tiʁo]) is a commune in the Eure-et-Loir department in northern France.

== Geography ==
The Commune along with another 70 communes shares part of a 47,681 hectare, Natura 2000 conservation area, called the Forêts et étangs du Perche.

== Population ==
Historical population
Year	Pop.	±% p.a.
1968	128	—
1975	109	−2.27%
1982	110	+0.13%
1990	138	+2.88%
1999	106	−2.89%
2007	119	+1.46%
2012	143	+3.74%
2017	140	−0.42%
2023	136	−0.48%
Source: INSEE

== See also ==
- Communes of the Eure-et-Loir department
