= Vichères =

- Commune
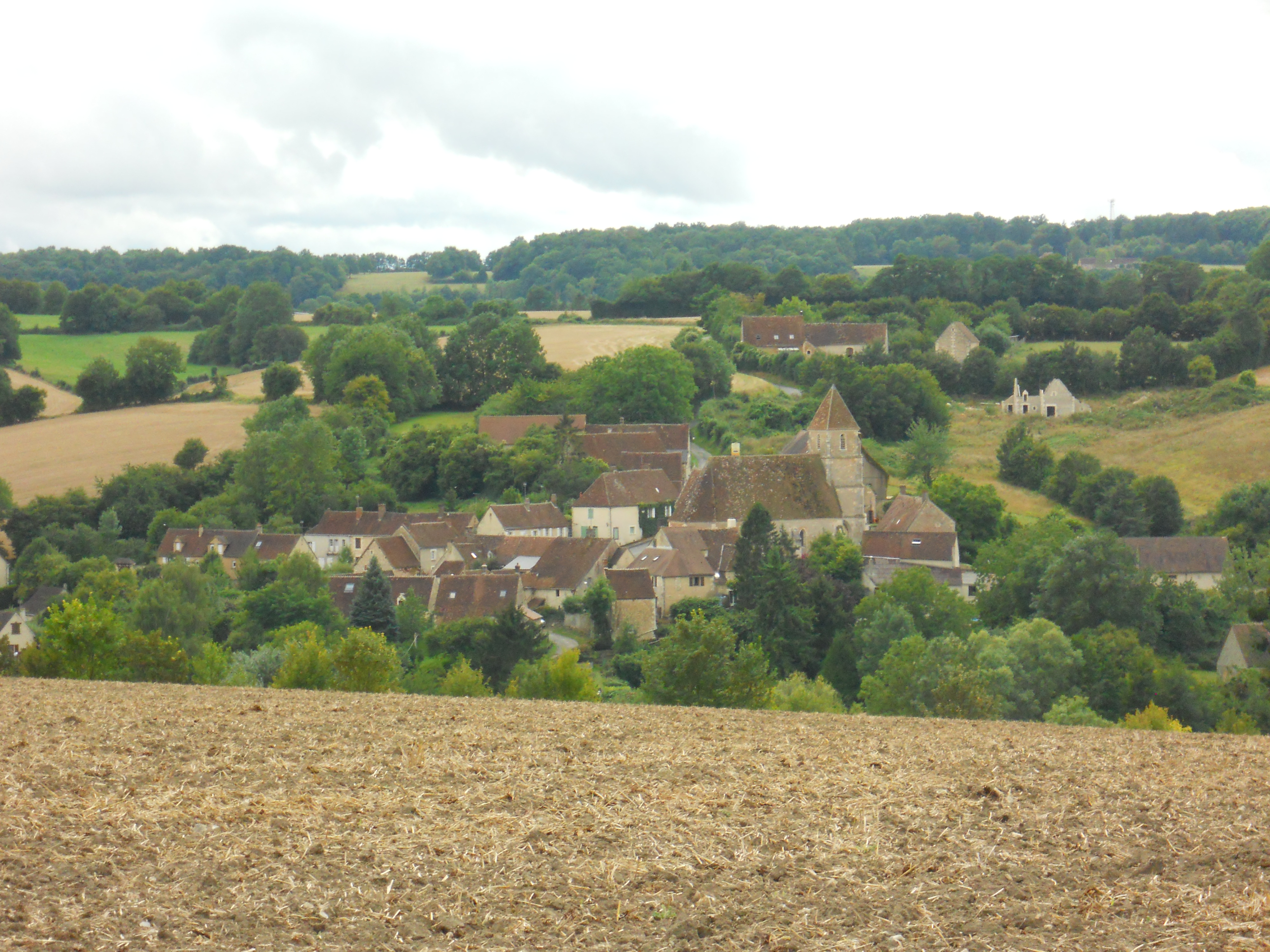
- A general view of Vichères
- Location of Vichères
- Location within France Location within Centre-Val de Loire
- Coordinates: 48°16′10″N 0°54′49″E
- Country: France
- Region: Centre-Val de Loire
- Department: Eure-et-Loir
- Arrondissement: Nogent-le-Rotrou
- Canton: Nogent-le-Rotrou
- Intercommunality: Perche

Government
  - Mayor (2020–2026): Gérard Morand
- Area^{1}: 12.27 km^{2} (4.74 sq mi)
- Elevation: 280 m (920 ft)
- Highest elevation: 286 m (938 ft)
- Lowest elevation: 152 m (499 ft)
- Population (2023): 289
  - Density: 23.6/km^{2} (61.0/sq mi)
- Time zone: UTC+01:00 (CET)
  - Summer (DST): UTC+02:00 (CEST)
- INSEE/Postal code: 28407 /28480
- ^{1} French Land Register data, which excludes lakes, ponds, glaciers > 1 km^{2} (0.386 sq mi or 247 acres) and river estuaries.

Vichères (French pronunciation: [viʃɛʁ]) is a commune in the Eure-et-Loir department in northern France.

== Population ==
Historical population
| Year | Pop. | ±% p.a. |
|---|---|---|
| 1968 | 312 | — |
| 1975 | 290 | −1.04% |
| 1982 | 324 | +1.60% |
| 1990 | 254 | −3.00% |
| 1999 | 254 | +0.00% |
| 2007 | 308 | +2.44% |
| 2012 | 316 | +0.51% |
| 2017 | 304 | −0.77% |
| 2023 | 289 | −0.84% |
Source: INSEE

== See also ==
- Communes of the Eure-et-Loir department
