= Canton of Nogent-le-Rotrou =

Coordinates: 48.32°N 0.82°E

The canton of Nogent-le-Rotrou is an administrative division of the Eure-et-Loir department, northern France. Its borders were modified at the French canton reorganisation which came into effect in March 2015. Its seat is in Nogent-le-Rotrou.

It consists of the following communes:

1. Arcisses
2. Argenvilliers
3. Belhomert-Guéhouville
4. Champrond-en-Gâtine
5. Champrond-en-Perchet
6. Chassant
7. Combres
8. Les Corvées-les-Yys
9. La Croix-du-Perche
10. Fontaine-Simon
11. La Gaudaine
12. Happonvilliers
13. La Loupe
14. Manou
15. Marolles-les-Buis
16. Meaucé
17. Montireau
18. Montlandon
19. Nogent-le-Rotrou
20. Nonvilliers-Grandhoux
21. Saint-Éliph
22. Saintigny
23. Saint-Jean-Pierre-Fixte
24. Saint-Maurice-Saint-Germain
25. Saint-Victor-de-Buthon
26. Souancé-au-Perche
27. Thiron-Gardais
28. Trizay-Coutretot-Saint-Serge
29. Vaupillon
30. Vichères
