= Saint-Maurice-Saint-Germain =

- Commune
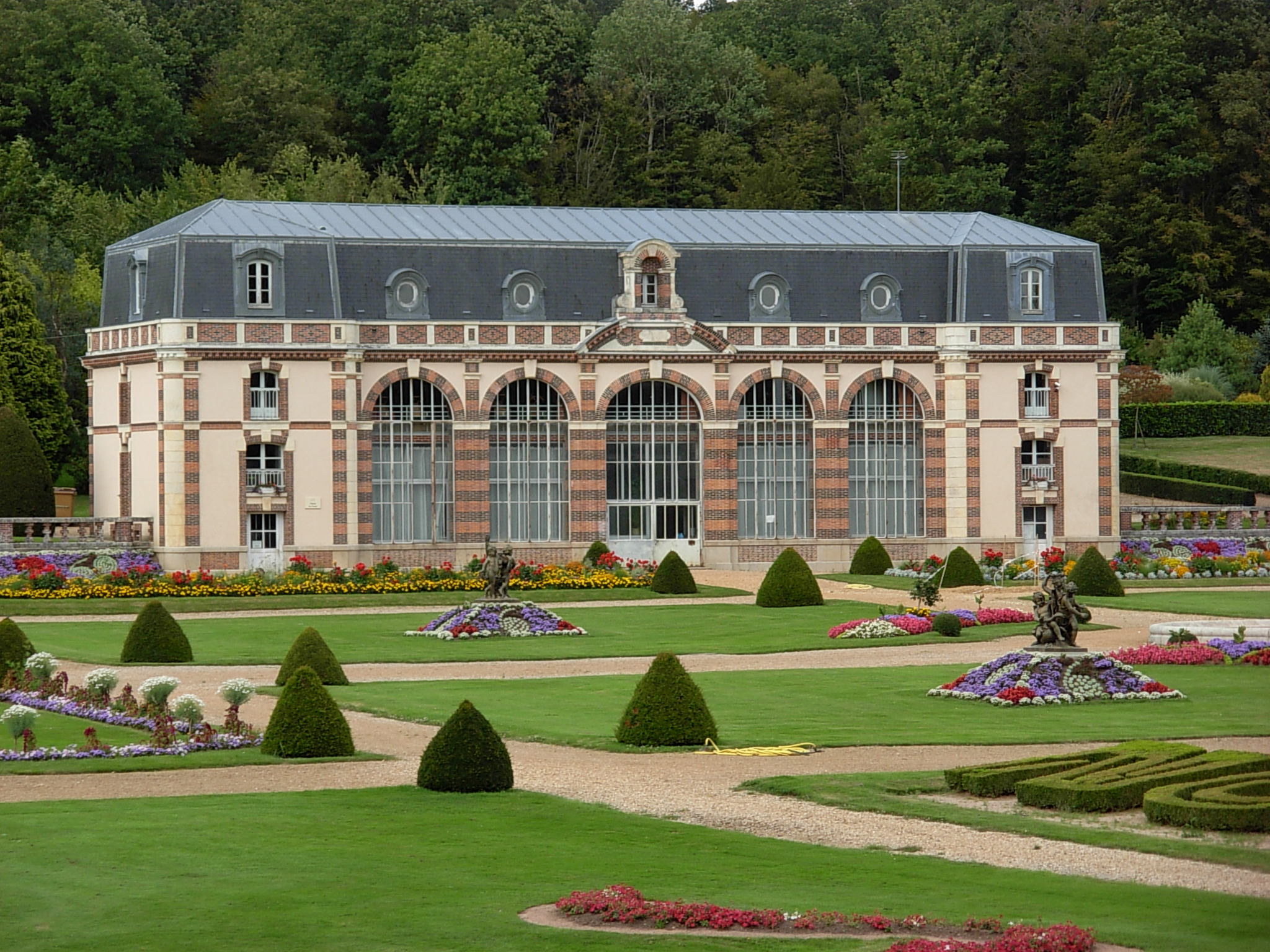
- Chateau of the Vaux Orangeraie

- Coat of arms
- Location of Saint-Maurice-Saint-Germain
- Location within France Location within Centre-Val de Loire
- Coordinates: 48°29′53″N 1°04′42″E
- Country: France
- Region: Centre-Val de Loire
- Department: Eure-et-Loir
- Arrondissement: Nogent-le-Rotrou
- Canton: Nogent-le-Rotrou

Government
  - Mayor (2020–2026): Benoît Genty
- Area^{1}: 12.19 km^{2} (4.71 sq mi)
- Elevation: 200 m (660 ft)
- Highest elevation: 275 m (902 ft)
- Lowest elevation: 181 m (594 ft)
- Population (2023): 528
  - Density: 43.3/km^{2} (112/sq mi)
- Time zone: UTC+01:00 (CET)
  - Summer (DST): UTC+02:00 (CEST)
- INSEE/Postal code: 28354 /28240
- ^{1} French Land Register data, which excludes lakes, ponds, glaciers > 1 km^{2} (0.386 sq mi or 247 acres) and river estuaries.

Saint-Maurice-Saint-Germain (French pronunciation: [sɛ̃ mɔʁis sɛ̃ ʒɛʁmɛ̃]) is a commune in the Eure-et-Loir department in northern France.

== Geography ==
The Commune along with another 70 communes shares part of a 47,681 hectare, Natura 2000 conservation area, called the Forêts et étangs du Perche.

== Population ==
Historical population
Year	Pop.	±% p.a.
1968	261	—
1975	366	+4.95%
1982	378	+0.46%
1990	320	−2.06%
1999	355	+1.16%
2007	405	+1.66%
2012	431	+1.25%
2017	415	−0.75%
2023	528	+4.10%
Source: INSEE

== See also ==
- Communes of the Eure-et-Loir department
