= Belhomert-Guéhouville =

- Commune
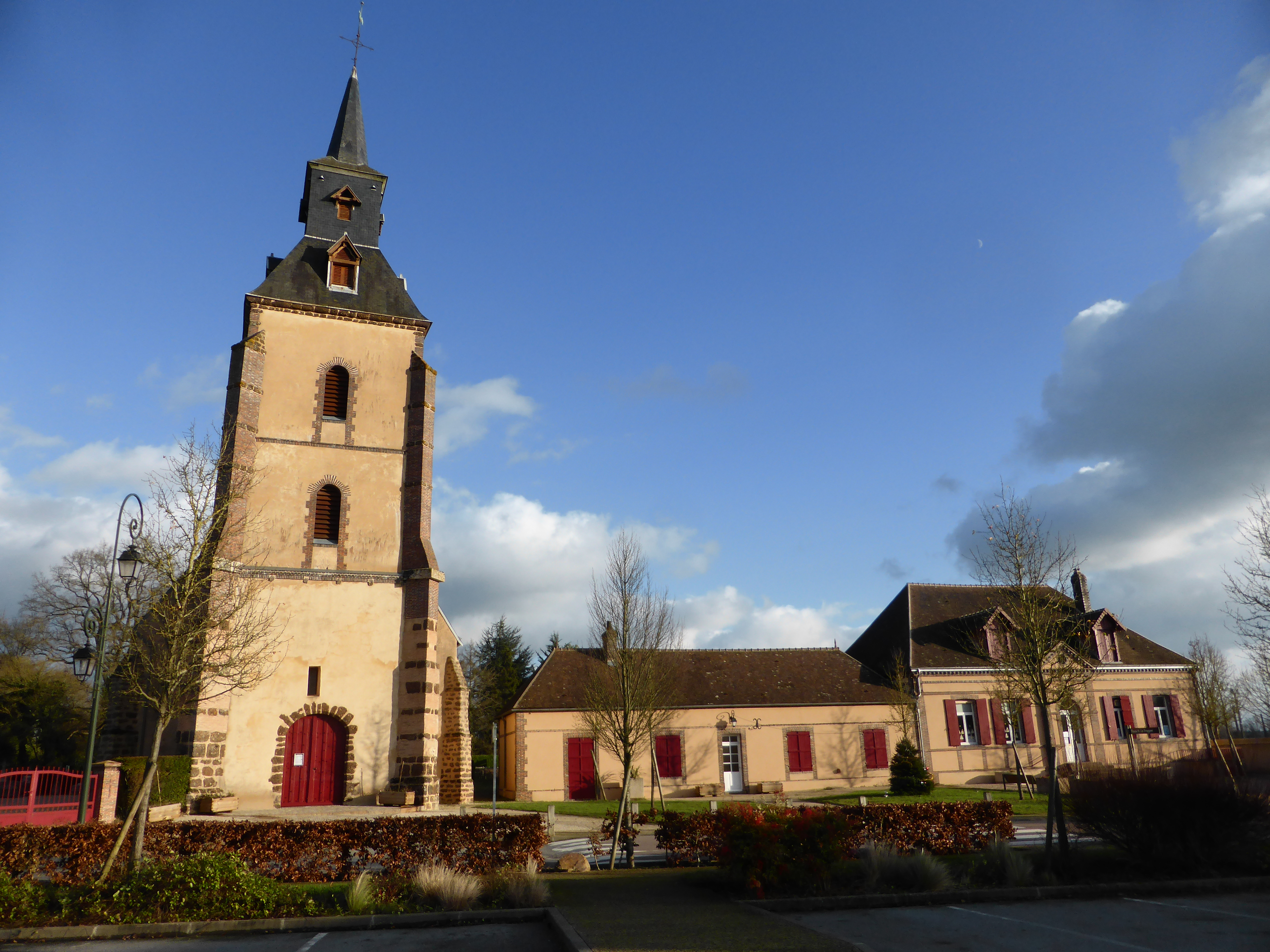
- The church and library in Belhomert-Guéhouville

- Coat of arms
- Location of Belhomert-Guéhouville
- Location within France Location within Centre-Val de Loire
- Coordinates: 48°30′24″N 1°03′30″E
- Country: France
- Region: Centre-Val de Loire
- Department: Eure-et-Loir
- Arrondissement: Nogent-le-Rotrou
- Canton: Nogent-le-Rotrou

Government
  - Mayor (2020–2026): Laurent Martineau
- Area^{1}: 10.95 km^{2} (4.23 sq mi)
- Elevation: 199 m (653 ft)
- Highest elevation: 271 m (889 ft)
- Lowest elevation: 182 m (597 ft)
- Population (2023): 810
  - Density: 74/km^{2} (190/sq mi)
- Time zone: UTC+01:00 (CET)
  - Summer (DST): UTC+02:00 (CEST)
- INSEE/Postal code: 28033 /28240
- Website: belhomert-guehouville.fr
- ^{1} French Land Register data, which excludes lakes, ponds, glaciers > 1 km^{2} (0.386 sq mi or 247 acres) and river estuaries.

Belhomert-Guéhouville (French pronunciation: [bɛlɔmɛʁ ɡeuvil]) is a commune in the Eure-et-Loir department in northern France.

== Geography ==
The Commune along with another 70 communes shares part of a 47,681 hectare, Natura 2000 conservation area, called the Forêts et étangs du Perche.

== Population ==
Historical population
Year	Pop.	±% p.a.
1968	437	—
1975	472	+1.11%
1982	589	+3.21%
1990	773	+3.46%
1999	808	+0.49%
2007	811	+0.05%
2012	818	+0.17%
2017	800	−0.44%
2023	810	+0.21%
Source: INSEE

== See also ==
- Communes of the Eure-et-Loir department
