= Ozanne =

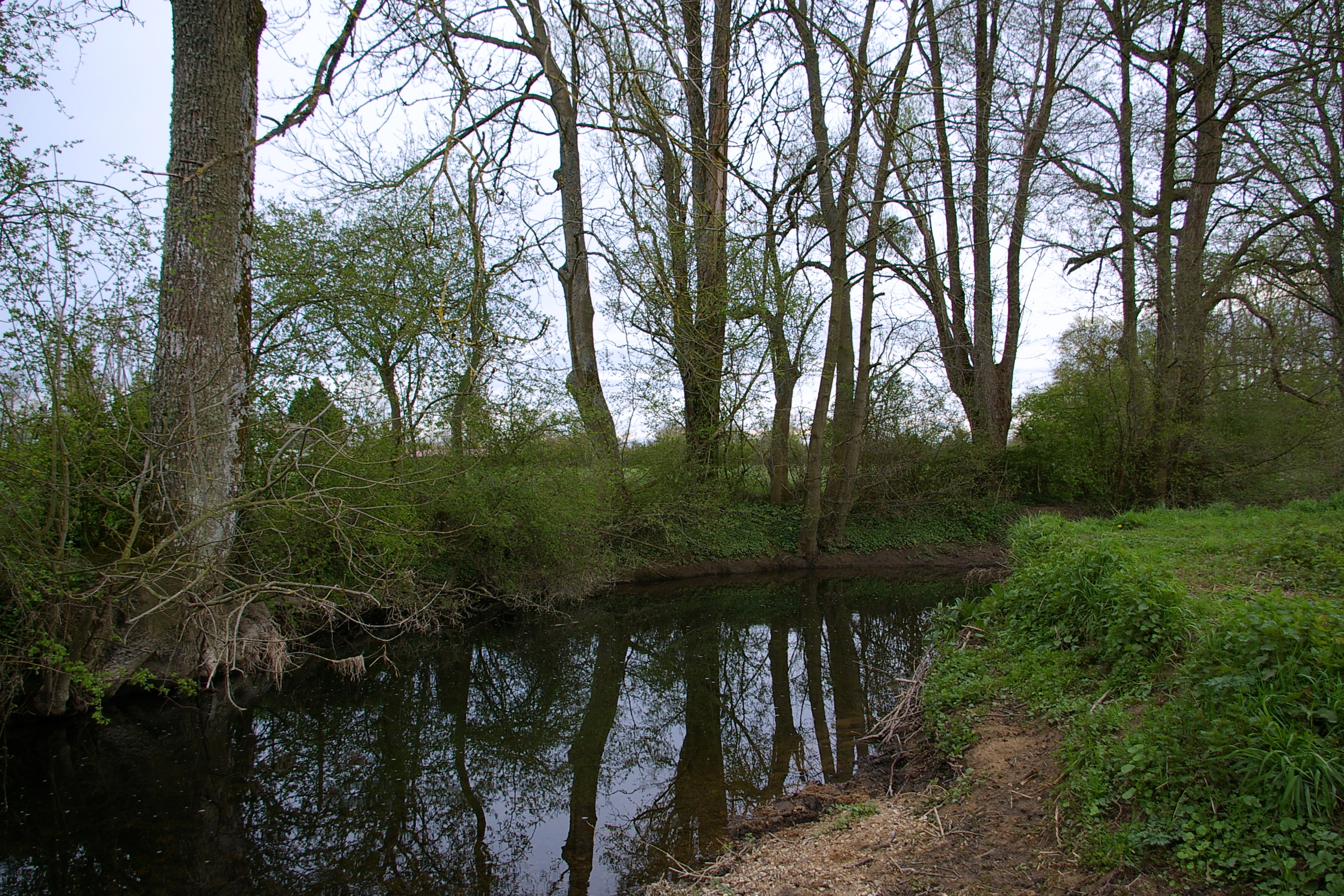
- river at Unverre

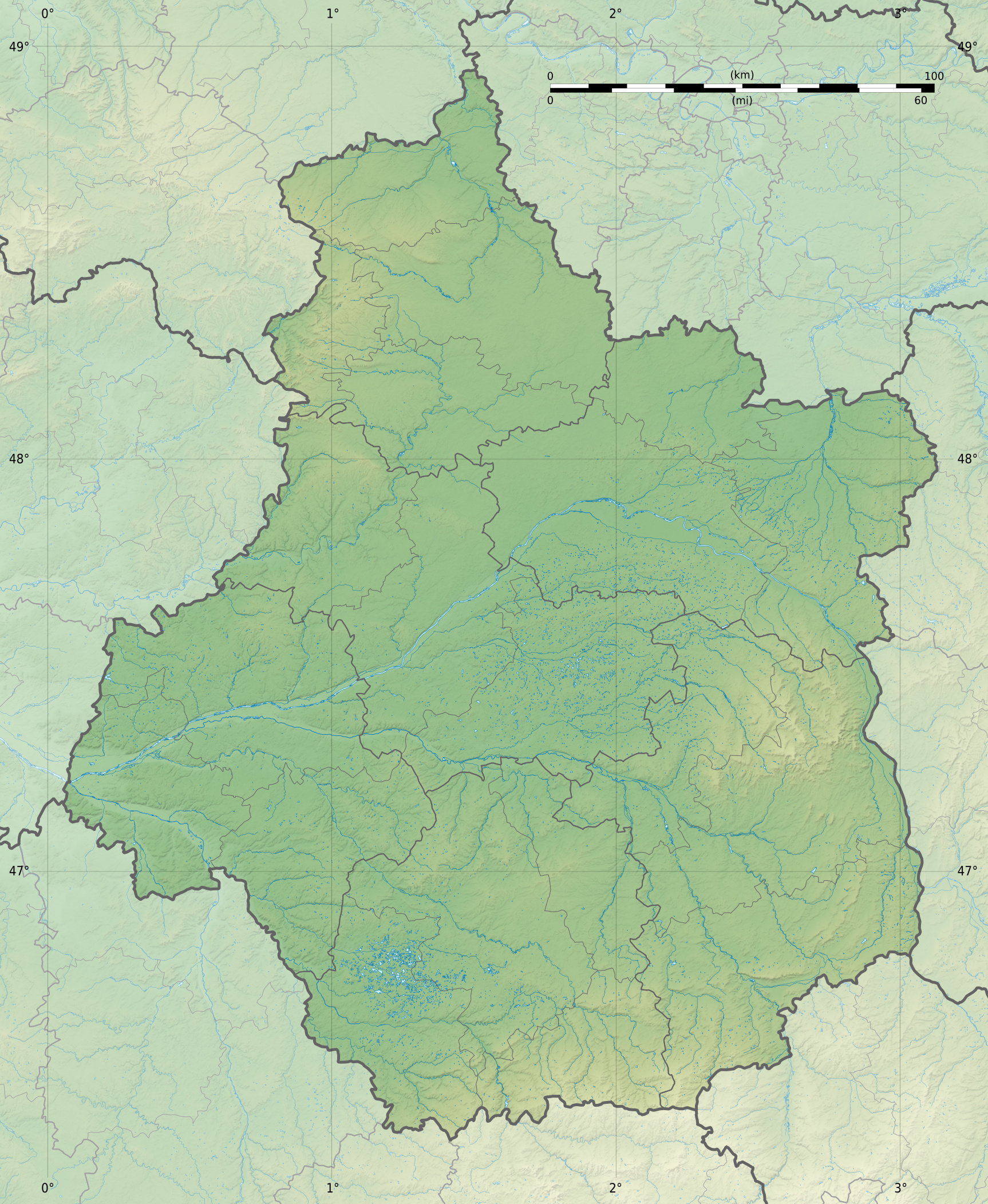
- Location within France Location within Centre-Val de Loire

Location
- Country: France
- Cities: Brou, Bonneval

Physical characteristics
- Source
  - location: near Béthonvilliers
  - coordinates: 48°14′20″N 0°55′08″E
  - elevation: 222 m (728 ft)
- Mouth
  - location: Loir at Bonneval
  - coordinates: 48°11′32″N 1°22′30″E
  - elevation: 129 m (423 ft)
- Length: 46 km (29 mi)
- Basin size: 278 km^{2} (107 sq mi)
- Discharge
  - average: 1.46 m^{3}/s (52 cu ft/s) (Trizay-lès-Bonneval)

Basin features
- Progression: Loir→ Sarthe→ Maine→ Loire→ Atlantic Ocean
- Tributaries
  - left: Montparentière
  - right: Sainte Suzanne, Esse, Tronchet, Vollards
- Source: SANDRE, Géoportail, Banque Hydro

The Ozanne is a 46.0 km long French river, a tributary of the Loir, which is a tributary of the Loire.

== Geography ==
The river spring is located at Perche-Gouët, Béthonvilliers at 222 m high at le Burail locality in le Bois de Beaumont.

2 offshoots: la Suzanne ou Sainte-Suzanne et l'Ozanne de Dampierre ou Moranne ou Mozanne which join near Brou.

It flows into le Loir, right bank, 1 km north of Bonneval at 129 m high at Ouzenain (locality).

== Tributaries ==
The Ozanne has seven official tributaries (14 including sub-tributaries) :

- (secondary source), (left), 3 km, in the two communes of Vicheres and Beaumont-les-Autels.
- (left), 0.9 km, in the two communes of Miermaigne and Beaumont-les-Autels.
- Seven branches of the Ozanne, for a total of 8.3 km in the six communes of Unverre, Brou, Yèvres, Dangeau, Moulhard and Luigny.
- The Sainte Suzanne, (right), 19.2 km in the five communes of Unverre, Authon-du-Perche, Charbonnières, Beaumont-les-Autels and Les Autels-Villevillon with two tributaries:
  - 4 km a branch of the Unverre.
  - The Sonnette, (right), 13.5 km in the five communes of Unverre, Charbonnières, Soize, La Bazoche-Gouet, and Les Autels-Villevillon.
- The Vallée d'Esse, (right), 10.1 km in the two communes of Unverre and Yèvres.
- The Vallée de Tronchet, (right), 8.8 km in the sole commune of Yèvres.
- The vallée de Montparentière, (left), 3.1 km in the commune of Yèvres.
- The vallée des Vollars, (right), 6.3 km in the three communes of Yèvres, Dangeau, and Gohory.

Strahler number of 3

== Watershed ==
The hydrological area of the Ozanne and its affluents is 278 km² wide, which is composed of farming land (91.52%), of forests and semi-natural areas (6.55%), artificial areas (1.76%) and damp areas (0.12%).

== Hydrology ==
The Ozanne discharge was studied from 1973 to 2014 at Prémoteux, near Trizay-lès-Bonneval at 126 m high, very close to its meeting point with the Loir. The river watershed is of 268 km^{2} (96% of the 278 km^{2}).

The river module at Trizay-lès-Bonneval is of 1.46 m^{3}/s.

The river has minor seasonal discharge fluctuations, with high waters in winter: mean monthly flow of 2.71 and 3.61 m^{3}/s, from December to March (peak in January) and low waters in summer, end of May to beginning of October, with a mean monthly debit drop of up to 0.235 m^{3} in August (235 l/s).

=== Low waters ===
However, the 3-day low-water volume can drop to a severe 0.044 m^{3}/s during a dry five-year period (or 44 l/s).

=== Floods ===
Floods can also be important.

The maximal discharge recorded was 65.2 m^{3}/s on January 22, 1995, while the maximal daily flow was 52.6 m^{3}/s on April 10, 1983, which is expected to happen every 10 to 15 years on average. The maximal height was 1920 mm (or 1.92 m) on January 14, 2004.

=== Water catchment ===
The yearly precipitation in the Ozanne basin is of a modest 173 mm, far below the national average, but also to that of la Loire (244 mm yearly), closer to its neighboring river Yerre (176 mm), with an average flow production of 5.5 l/s/km^{2}.

== Mill localities ==
Géoportail records 11 "mill" localities : le moulin de Vinet, le moulin de l'Orme, le moulin Foulon, le moulin Vieux et un gué, le moulin Brière, le moulin de Forçonnerie, le moulin d'Epasses, le moulin de Georges, le moulin de la Varenne, le moulin de Patry, un gué, le moulin de Frécot.

== ZNIEFF ==
The river Ozanne marks the northern limit of a little ZNIEFF Chenaie-charmaie de la Poupelière.
