= 2025 Sidecar Motocross World Championship =

Motocross World Championship

2025 Sidecarcross World Championship
Season
- Grands Prix: 9
- Duration: 10 May 2025–28 September 2025

Drivers
- Champions: (Netherlands) Koen Hermans (Netherlands) Ben van den Bogaart

The 2025 FIM Sidecarcross World Championship is the 45nd edition of the competition.

== Calendar ==
=== Calendar ===
Locations of the venues in the 2025 FIM Sidecar Motocross World Championship

The following table outlines the official 2025 season calendar:

Round	Date	Country	Venue
1	10–11 May 2025	Czech Republic	Kramolín
2	24–25 May 2025	United Kingdom	Foxhill
3	7–8 June 2025	France	Dampierre-sous-Brou
4	14–15 June 2025	Poland	Gdańsk
5	28–29 June 2025	Belgium	Lommel
6	19–20 July 2025	Germany	Bessenbach
7	16–17 August 2025	Latvia	Madona
8	6–7 September 2025	France	Vesoul
9	20–21 September 2025	Germany	Rudersberg

=== SidecarCross and QuadCross of Nations ===
The 2025 edition of the FIM SidecarCross and QuadCross of Nations (SQXoN) is scheduled to take place in Heerde, Netherlands, on 27–28 September 2025.

== Standings ==
Pos.	Bike No.	Driver / Passenger	CZE (Czech Republic)		GBR (United Kingdom)		FRA (France)		POL (Poland)		BEL (Belgium)		GER (Germany)		LAT (Latvia)		FRA (France)		GER (Germany)		Points
1	3	(Netherlands) Koen Hermans / (Netherlands) Ben van den Bogaart	1^{+5}	2	1^{+5}	1	4^{+3}	1	3^{+4}	5	6^{+2}	11	4^{+2}	10	4	6	17^{+4}	3	1^{+5}	3	362
2	94	(France) Killian Prunier / (France) Evan Prunier	2^{+4}	4	2^{+5}	26	1^{+5}	3	1^{+5}	1	14	10	3^{+4}	1	Ret^{+2}	7	1^{+5}	1	4^{+4}	2	358
3	199	(United Kingdom) Brett Wilkinson / (United Kingdom) Joe Millard	8^{+3}	5	3^{+4}	4	5^{+5}	2	6^{+2}	4	4	2	6^{+4}	3	5^{+4}	5	4^{+5}	4	11^{+2}	4	338
4	101	(Latvia) Daniels Lielbardis / (Latvia) Bruno Lielbardis	7^{+4}	15	Ret	10	6	9	2^{+4}	2	7^{+4}	5	1^{+5}	6	2^{+5}	1	3	Ret			285
4	101	/ (France) Nicolas Musset																	12	6	285
5	91	(Austria) Benjamin Weiss / (Austria) Patrick Schneider	9^{+2}	1	6^{+1}	9	8^{+1}	4	7^{+2}	8	17	12	7^{+3}	7			6^{+4}	10	2^{+4}	7	242
6	45	(Netherlands) Tim Leferink / (Netherlands) Sem Leferink	6^{+2}	7	8^{+3}	3	Ret	DNS	5^{+3}	6	2^{+4}	1	2^{+5}	5	3^{+4}	Ret	5^{+1}	17	DNS	DNS	240
7	7	(Netherlands) Justin Keuben / (Netherlands) Dion Rietman	5^{+1}	9	11^{+2}	2	9^{+2}	8	4^{+1}	3	3^{+5}	Ret	5	4	1^{+5}	2	22	DNS			240
8	109	(Belgium) Davy Sanders / (Netherlands) Jens Vincent	11	8	5^{+3}	11	7^{+4}	Ret	22^{+3}	9	10^{+2}	7	11^{+3}	9	7^{+3}	3	15^{+3}	7	7^{+1}	9	224
9	418	(Netherlands) Stephan Wijers / (Netherlands) Han van Hal	10	11	Ret^{+2}	17	12	10	9	7	9^{+3}	4	9	11	6^{+3}	4	9^{+2}	8	10	13	210
10	17	(Germany) Tim Prümmer / (Belgium) Jarno Steegmans	3^{+3}	6	DNQ	DNQ					8^{+1}	6	8^{+1}	2			7^{+2}	6	3^{+3}	8	195
10	17	/ (Netherlands) Aivar van de Wiel					DNQ	DNQ													195
10	17	/ (Germany) Justin Blume							8^{+1}	10											195
11	13	(United Kingdom) Michael Hodges / (United Kingdom) Ryan Henderson	15	12	7	7	10^{+3}	25	13	11	16	Ret	10	8	12^{+1}	9	8^{+1}	5	5^{+3}	5	191
12	151	(Estonia) Gert Gordejev / (France) Rodolphe Lebreton	17	21	13	12	13	14	11	13	19	15	12	15	9	14	11	14	8	10	137
13	1	(Belgium) Marvin Vanluchene / (France) Nicolas Musset	4^{+5}	3	4^{+4}	5	2^{+2}	5	10^{+5}	DNS											137
14	99	(Netherlands) Thom van de Lagemaat / (Germany) Justin Blume	21	17	14^{+1}	14															120
14	99	/ (Belgium) Robbe De Veene					15	16	Ret	15	13	9	14	12					14	11	120
14	99	/ (France) Nicolas Musset													8^{+2}	8	25	18			120
15	20	(Germany) Adrian Peter / (Germany) Joel Hoffmann	Ret	19	15	25	17	12	14	14	Ret	DNS	13	13	11	10	16	12	9^{+2}	12	109
16	888	(United Kingdom) Stuart Brown / (United Kingdom) Scott Grahame	13	10	9	8	3^{+4}	6			11	Ret	Ret^{+1}	Ret			DNQ	DNQ	25	DNS	94
17	10	(United Kingdom) Dan Foden / (Germany) Noah Weinmann											Ret^{+2}	Ret			2^{+3}	2	6^{+5}	1	94
18	25	(Germany) Joshua Weinmann / (Germany) Noah Weinmann	16	13	10	6	11	7	12	12	DNQ	DNQ									81
19	40	(France) Romaric Chanteloup / (France) Josselyn Chanteloup	20	25	16	15	16	13	Ret	Ret	Ret	20	16	14			18	16	13	17 (Note: Chanteloup/Chanteloup were docked five positions following the second race at the ninth round due to failing a post race noise test.)	58
20	100	(United Kingdom) Jake Brown / (Netherlands) Lars de Laat	Ret	16	Ret	DNS															56
20	100	/ (United Kingdom) Christopher Booth									18^{+1}	Ret	21	Ret	14^{+1}	11	10	11	22^{+1}	14	56
21	936	(France) Gwendal Carcreff / (France) Mathis Hupon			12	13	14	11			DNQ	DNQ					14	9			53
22	82	(Netherlands) Etienne Bax / (Netherlands) Robbie Bax									1^{+5}	3									50
23	31	(Netherlands) Julian Veldman / (Belgium) Glenn Janssens									5^{+3}	8									32
24	141	(Netherlands) Boyd Verhees / (Netherlands) Peer Verhees	23	28	20	23	24	18			20	Ret	23	18	16	13	DNQ	DNQ			29
24	141	/ (Netherlands) Niels Wesselink							16	19											29
24	141	/ (Belgium) Loid Bekaert																	21	20	29
25	111	(Netherlands) Daniël Willemsen / (Czech Republic) Michal Gabor	12	14			DNS^{+1}	DNS			Ret	14	DNS	DNS			Ret	DNS			24
25	111	/ (Netherlands) Gijs Barink							DNS	DNS											24
26	874	(France) Dominique Bendaoud / (France) Antoine Pasquier					18	17									13	13			23
27	124	(Germany) Leon Hofmann / (Germany) Julian Zimmermann	24	20							23	16	19	DNS					15	16	19
28	72	(Netherlands) Frank Mulders / (Netherlands) Marc van Deutekom									12	13	22	20							18
29	914	(Germany) Patrick Hengster / (Germany) Celina Jahn	26	26	19	19	20	26	18	Ret	DNQ	DNQ	18	17							17
29	914	/ (Belgium) Arne Vanhamel																	27	19	17
30	127	(Germany) Andre Knübben / (Germany) Florian Plettke	DNQ	DNQ							Ret	DNS					19	19	16	15	17
30	127	/ (Netherlands) Nick Maas											Ret	Ret							17
31	444	(Estonia) Robert Lihtsa / (Estonia) Markus Lina							Ret	16					10	Ret					16
32	711	(Estonia) Markus Normak / (Latvia) Tomass Daniels Dukulis													15	12					15
33	84	(Switzerland) Remo Käser / (Switzerland) Luca Käser											Ret	22			12	15	25	DNS	15
34	47	(France) Artis Devoldere / (France) Alexandre Tourbier	18	22			21	15			15	Ret	DNS	DNS							15
35	83	(Estonia) Kevin Vahter / (Estonia) Kenny Vahter							21	22					13	15					14
36	18	(Germany) Tobias Hertfelder / (Belgium) Niki Debruyne					23	20	20	17	Ret	DNS	20	Ret							14
36	18	/ (Germany) Justin Blume													18	17	DNS	DNS	DNS	DNS	14
37	55	(Germany) Lukas Erlecke / (Germany) Leon Freygang	28	24					17	18			17	19							13
38	54	(Estonia) Ülar Karing / (Estonia) Oliver Sebastian Lamp							15	Ret					Ret	16					11
39	48	(Switzerland) David Bolliger / (Switzerland) William Leutwyler	DNQ	DNQ									15	16							11
40	114	(Netherlands) Koen Grondman / (Netherlands) Niels Wesselink	19	18	18	21	DNQ	DNQ													8
41	81	(France) Grégory Raymond / (Denmark) Mikkel Modekjær	DNQ	DNQ																	8
41	81	/ (Lithuania) Viktorija Vareikaite					25	21									Ret	20	17	18	8
42	723	(Belgium) Jason Van Daele / (Netherlands) Loet van der Putten	14^{+1}	Ret																	8
42	723	/ (France) Luc Rostingt					Ret	DNS													8
43	24	(United Kingdom) George Kinge / (United Kingdom) Jim Kinge			17	18															7
44	184	(Germany) Jan Hoormann / (Belgium) Andy Schlinnertz					22	27 (Note: Hoorman/Schlinnertz were docked five positions following the second race at the third round due to failing a post race noise test.)			DNQ	18	Ret	Ret			21	22	18	21	6
45	331	(Finland) Timo Karttiala / (Finland) Valtteri Mäki													17	19					6
46	51	(France) Stéphane Gouin / (France) Kyllian Gouin	DNQ	DNQ			19	19					Ret	DNS			DNQ	DNQ	19	26	6
47	721	(United Kingdom) Neil Campbell / (United Kingdom) Paul Horton			Ret	16															5
48	666	(Netherlands) Tim Barink / (Netherlands) Gijs Barink									21	17	DNQ	DNQ					26	25	4
49	191	(Lithuania) Jonas Pirtinas / (Latvia) Lotārs Aleksejevs							23	21					20	18					4
50	125	(Belgium) Yens Delmotte / (Belgium) Joey Valcke									22	19							20	22	3
51	21	(Latvia) Rihards Rupeiks / (Latvia) Roberts Klāvs Užāns													19	20					3
52	27	(Lithuania) Tomas Baltušis / (Lithuania) Mantvydas Baltušis							19	20											3
53	177	(United Kingdom) Ashlie Williams / (United Kingdom) Jak Watson			22	20															1
54	92	(United Kingdom) Sam Osbaldiston / (United Kingdom) Thomas Mackay			Ret	22											20	Ret			1
	43	(Estonia) Argo Poldsaar / (Estonia) Tom Küüsmaa													21	21					0
	6	(United Kingdom) Jack Rogers / (United Kingdom) Ryan Beavis			23	28 (Note: Rogers/Beavis were docked five positions following the second race at the second round due to failing a post race noise test.)					DNQ	DNQ	DNQ	DNQ			24	21			0
	772	(Switzerland) Sven Buob / (Switzerland) Marc Buob											24	21							0
	8	(Denmark) Jacob Jensen / (Belgium) Arne Vanhamel	27	Ret	21	DNS			DNS	DNS											0
	232	(Latvia) Jurgis Macs / (Latvia) Artis Fjodorovs													22	22					0
	169	(Germany) Nick Uhlig / (Germany) Philipp Oettel	22	23									DNQ	DNQ							0
	77	(France) Stéphane Bourre / (France) Ruddy Gonner					27	22													0
	33	(Germany) Pierre Seifert / (Germany) Paul Kinder	DNQ	DNQ									DNQ	DNQ			Ret	23	23	24	0
	999	(Lithuania) Liutauras Variakojis / (Latvia) Martins Antons							24	23											0
	73	(France) Frederic Perdereau / (France) Baptiste Sallé					26	23													0
	110	(Belgium) Charly Bonnet / (Netherlands) Cyril Chrétien																	28 (Note: Bonnet/Chrétien were docked five positions following the first race at the ninth round due to failing a post race noise test.)	23	0
	96	(Latvia) Kaspars Lubgans / (Latvia) Oskars Dudens													Ret	23 (Note: Lubgans/Dudens were docked five positions following the second race at the seventh round due to failing a post race noise test.)					0
	319	(France) Ethan Poirier / (France) Matthias Poirier															23	Ret			0
	112	(United Kingdom) Jonathan Wilson / (United Kingdom) Andrew Rowan			24	24															0
	179	(France) Yohann Marquis / (France) Alex Fernandes					Ret	24													0
	19	(Netherlands) Sven Wisselink / (France) Luc Rostingt	25	27																	0
	134	(France) Raphaël Monterlos / (France) Alexis Monterlos															26	Ret			0
	89	(United Kingdom) Liam Mudie / (United Kingdom) Jake Grahame			Ret	27															0
	61	(Czech Republic) Ladislav Peč / (Czech Republic) Vitezslav Peč							Ret	Ret											0
	214	(Belgium) Glenn Van der Schraelen / (Belgium) Yan Hereygers									Ret	DNS									0
	16	(Belgium) Joeri Van Malderen / (Belgium) Tony Kramar									Ret	DNS									0
	34	(Estonia) Tanel Reesna / (Estonia) Sten Niitsoo													Ret	DNS					0
	499	(Finland) Jere Padinki / (Finland) Niko Padinki													Ret	DNS					0
	202	(Belgium) Bert Soetaert / (Belgium) Loid Bekaert									DNQ	Ret									0
	228	(Netherlands) Davy Ebben / (Netherlands) Sven van Dommelen	DNQ	DNQ																	0
	97	(Netherlands) Wilfried Vos / (Netherlands) Aivar van de Wiel	DNQ	DNQ																	0
	143	(Switzerland) Ronny Gloor / (Switzerland) Kenneth Lukas Soller	DNQ	DNQ																	0
Pos.	Bike No.	Driver / Passenger	CZE (Czech Republic)		GBR (United Kingdom)		FRA (France)		POL (Poland)		BEL (Belgium)		GER (Germany)		LAT (Latvia)		FRA (France)		GER (Germany)		Points
