= Soizé =

- Part of Authon-du-Perche
- Location of Soizé
- Location within France Location within Centre-Val de Loire
- Coordinates: 48°10′06″N 0°53′16″E
- Country: France
- Region: Centre-Val de Loire
- Department: Eure-et-Loir
- Arrondissement: Nogent-le-Rotrou
- Canton: Brou
- Commune: Authon-du-Perche
- Area^{1}: 18.13 km^{2} (7.00 sq mi)
- Elevation: 234 m (768 ft)
- Highest elevation: 253 m (830 ft)
- Lowest elevation: 162 m (531 ft)
- Population (2023): 335
  - Density: 18.5/km^{2} (47.9/sq mi)
- Time zone: UTC+01:00 (CET)
  - Summer (DST): UTC+02:00 (CEST)
- Postal code: 28330
- ^{1} French Land Register data, which excludes lakes, ponds, glaciers > 1 km^{2} (0.386 sq mi or 247 acres) and river estuaries.

Soizé (French pronunciation: [swaze]) is a commune in the Eure-et-Loir department in the Centre-Val de Loire region in northern France. It lies 3.5 kilometres from the closest small town of Authon-du-Perche. On 1 January 2019, it was merged into the commune Authon-du-Perche.

== See also ==
- Communes of the Eure-et-Loir department
