= Bullou =

- Part of Dangeau
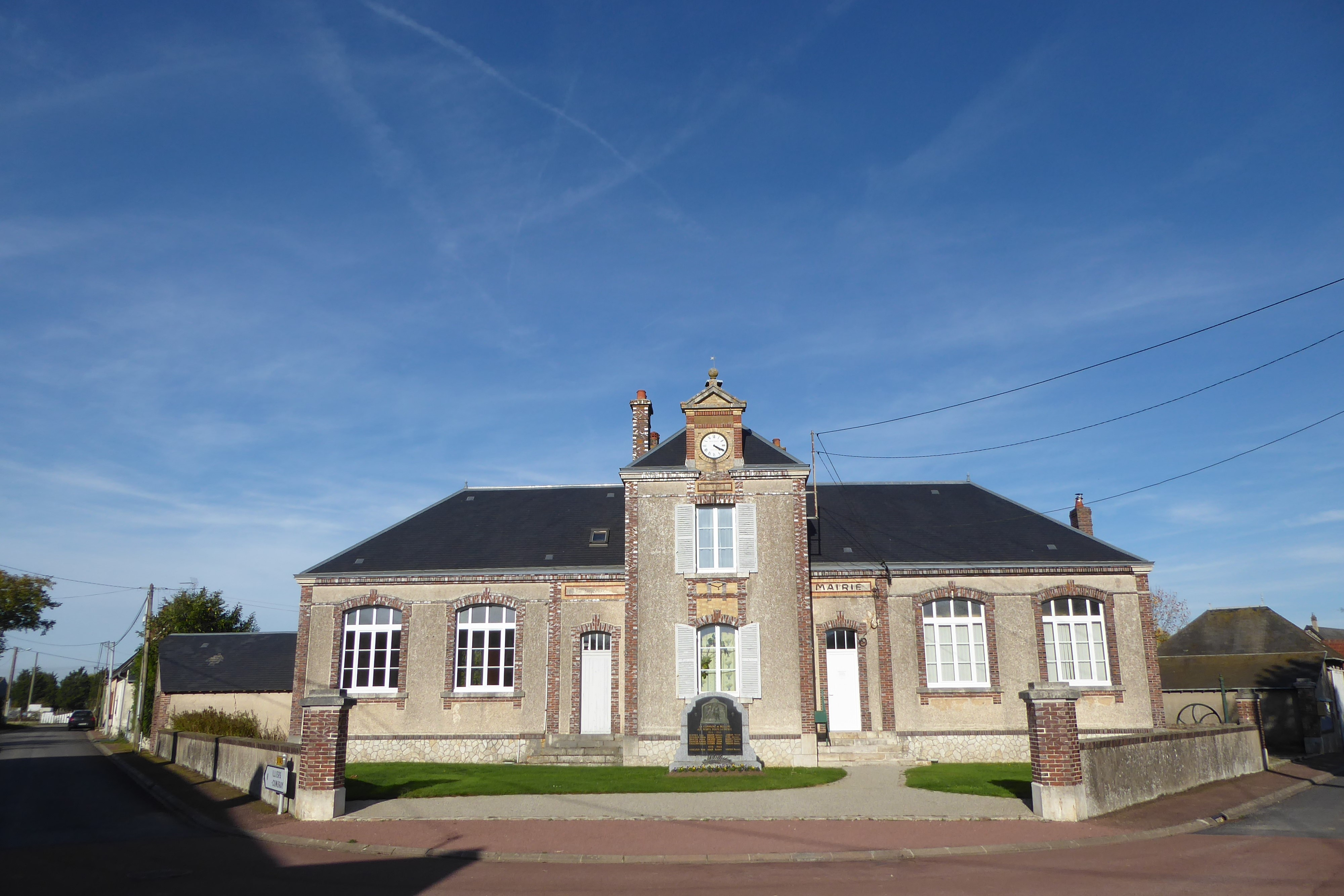
- Town hall
- Location of Bullou
- Location within France Location within Centre-Val de Loire
- Coordinates: 48°14′36″N 1°15′08″E
- Country: France
- Region: Centre-Val de Loire
- Department: Eure-et-Loir
- Arrondissement: Châteaudun
- Canton: Brou
- Commune: Dangeau
- Area^{1}: 9.14 km^{2} (3.53 sq mi)
- Elevation: 134 m (440 ft)
- Highest elevation: 169 m (554 ft)
- Lowest elevation: 144 m (472 ft)
- Population (2015): 238
  - Density: 26.0/km^{2} (67.4/sq mi)
- Time zone: UTC+01:00 (CET)
  - Summer (DST): UTC+02:00 (CEST)
- Postal code: 28160
- ^{1} French Land Register data, which excludes lakes, ponds, glaciers > 1 km^{2} (0.386 sq mi or 247 acres) and river estuaries.

Bullou (French pronunciation: [bylu]) is a former commune in the Eure-et-Loir department in northern France. On 1 January 2018, it was merged into the commune of Dangeau.

== See also ==
- Communes of the Eure-et-Loir department
