= Mézières =

Mézières may refer to:

== People ==
- Alfred Jean François Mézières (1826–1915), French journalist, politician and historian of literature
- Jean-Claude Mézières (1938–2022), French comic book artist
- Rob De Mezieres, South African writer and director
- Nicolas Le Camus de Mézières (1721–1789), French architect and theoretician
- Philippe de Mézières (1327–1405), French soldier and author
- Eleanor Oglethorpe de Mezieres (1684–1775), an English Jacobite who settled in France after James II was deposed in the Glorious Revolution of 1688

== Places ==
- Mézières, Ardennes, commune and chef-lieu of the Ardennes department of northern France, to be merged in 1965 with Charleville to form Charleville-Mézières
- Mézières, Fribourg, municipality of the canton of Fribourg, Switzerland
  - Mézières Castle, a castle in the municipality of Mézières of the Canton of Fribourg in Switzerland. It is a Swiss heritage site of national significance
- Mézières, Vaud, municipality of the canton of Vaud, Switzerland
- Charleville-Mézières, a commune in northern France, chef-lieu of the Ardennes department in the Champagne-Ardenne region
  - Arrondissement of Charleville-Mézières, an arrondissement of France in the Ardennes department in the Champagne-Ardenne region
  - Gare de Charleville-Mézières, a railway station serving the town Charleville-Mézières, Ardennes department, northeastern France
- Mézières-au-Perche, a commune in the Eure-et-Loir department in northern France
- Mézières-en-Brenne, a commune in the Indre department in central France
- Mézières-en-Drouais, a commune in the Eure-et-Loir department in northern France
- Mézières-en-Gâtinais, a commune in the Loiret department in north-central France
- Mézières-en-Santerre, a commune in the Somme department in Picardie in northern France
- Mézières-en-Vexin, a commune in the Eure department and Haute-Normandie region of France
- Mézières-lez-Cléry, a commune in the Loiret department in north-central France
- Mézières-sous-Lavardin, a commune in the Sarthe department in the region of Pays-de-la-Loire in north-western France
- Mézières-sur-Couesnon, a commune in the Ille-et-Vilaine department in Brittany in northwestern France
- Mézières-sur-Issoire (Masères), a commune in the Haute-Vienne department in the Limousin region in west-central France
- Mézières-sur-Oise, a commune in the Aisne department in Picardy in northern France
- Mézières-sur-Ponthouin, a commune in the Sarthe department in the region of Pays-de-la-Loire in north-western France
- Mézières-sur-Seine, a commune in the Yvelines department in the Île-de-France in north-central France
- Prix-lès-Mézières, a commune in the Ardennes department in northern France
- Séry-lès-Mézières, a commune in the Aisne department in Picardy in northern France

== Other ==
- AS Prix-lès-Mézières, a French football club based in Prix-lès-Mézières in the Champagne-Ardenne region in northern France
- Siege of Mézières (1521), during the Italian War of 1521–1526
