= Chapelle-Guillaume =

- Commune
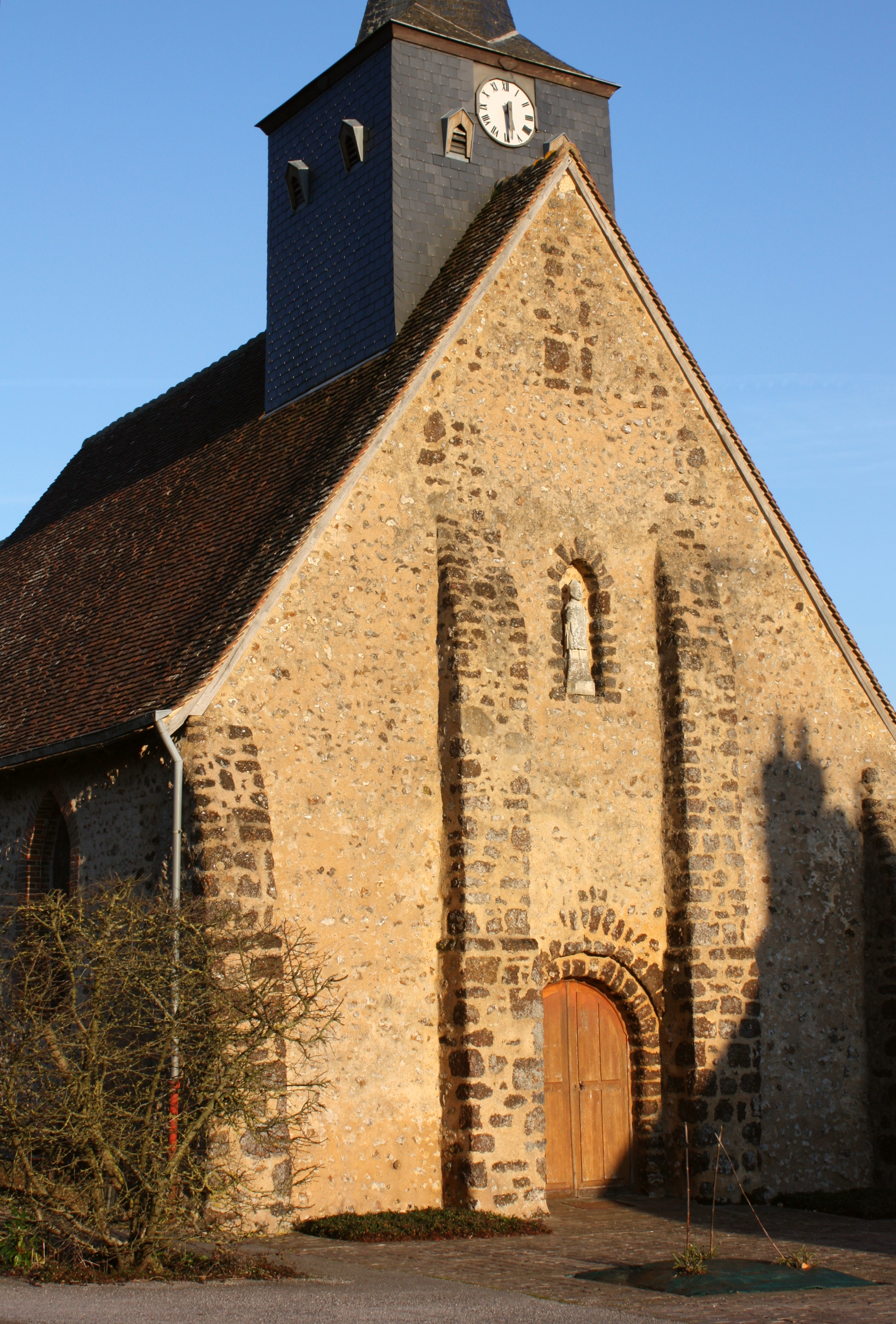
- The church in Chapelle-Guillaume
- Location of Chapelle-Guillaume
- Location within France Location within Centre-Val de Loire
- Coordinates: 48°06′50″N 0°54′21″E
- Country: France
- Region: Centre-Val de Loire
- Department: Eure-et-Loir
- Arrondissement: Nogent-le-Rotrou
- Canton: Brou

Government
  - Mayor (2020–2026): Joël Ferré
- Area^{1}: 19.86 km^{2} (7.67 sq mi)
- Elevation: 207 m (679 ft)
- Highest elevation: 251 m (823 ft)
- Lowest elevation: 184 m (604 ft)
- Population (2023): 181
  - Density: 9.11/km^{2} (23.6/sq mi)
- Time zone: UTC+01:00 (CET)
  - Summer (DST): UTC+02:00 (CEST)
- INSEE/Postal code: 28078 /28330
- ^{1} French Land Register data, which excludes lakes, ponds, glaciers > 1 km^{2} (0.386 sq mi or 247 acres) and river estuaries.

Chapelle-Guillaume (French pronunciation: [ʃapɛl ɡijom]) is a commune in the Eure-et-Loir department in northern France.

== Population ==
Historical population
Year	Pop.	±% p.a.
1968	322	—
1975	260	−3.01%
1982	236	−1.37%
1990	190	−2.67%
1999	188	−0.12%
2007	199	+0.71%
2012	208	+0.89%
2017	185	−2.32%
2023	181	−0.36%
Source: INSEE

== See also ==
- Communes of the Eure-et-Loir department
