= Coudray-au-Perche =

- Commune
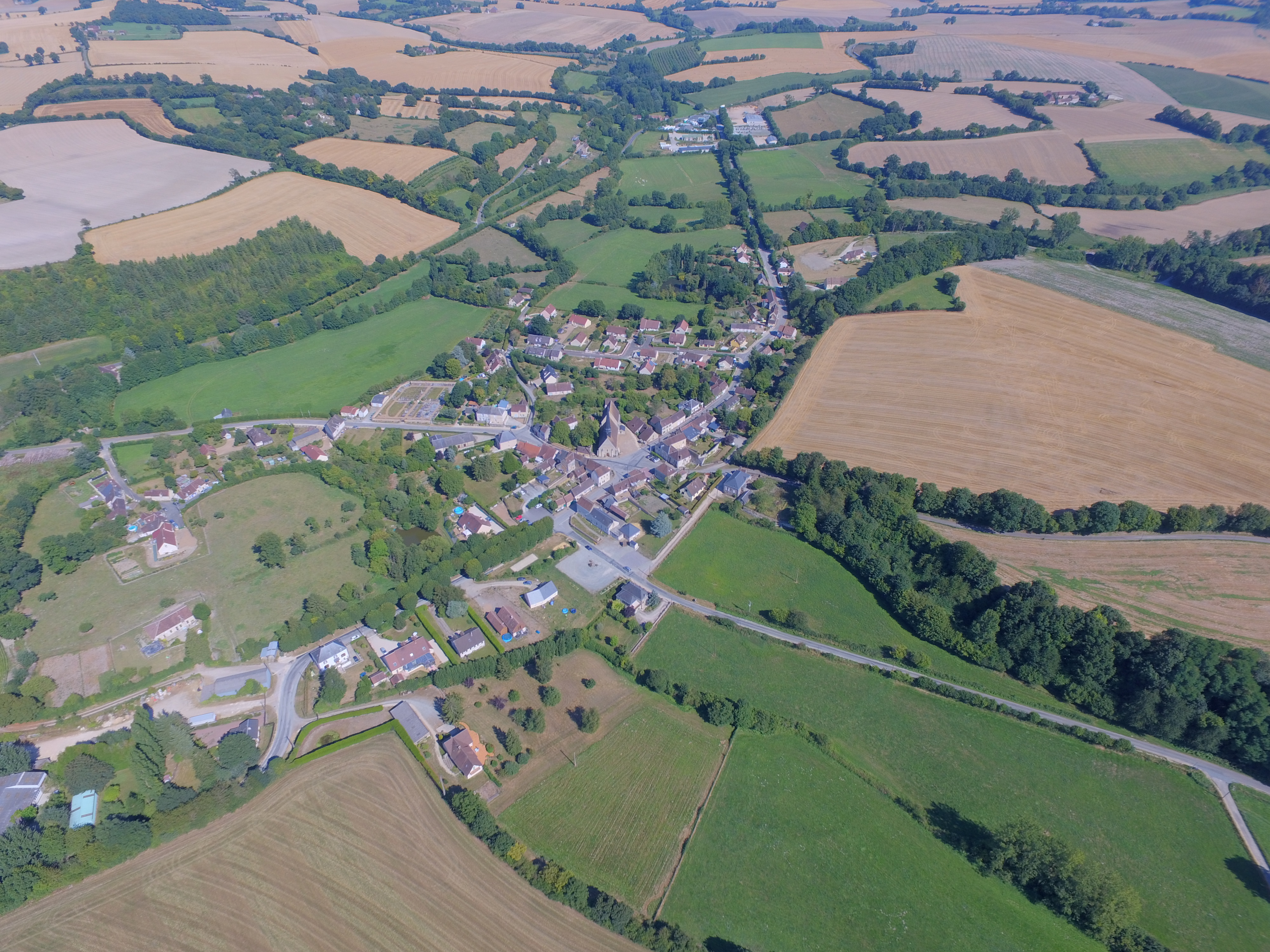
- An aerial view of Coudray-au-Perche

- Coat of arms
- Location of Coudray-au-Perche
- Location within France Location within Centre-Val de Loire
- Coordinates: 48°13′59″N 0°51′27″E
- Country: France
- Region: Centre-Val de Loire
- Department: Eure-et-Loir
- Arrondissement: Nogent-le-Rotrou
- Canton: Brou
- Intercommunality: Perche

Government
  - Mayor (2020–2026): Nathalie Brunet
- Area^{1}: 14.64 km^{2} (5.65 sq mi)
- Elevation: 166 m (545 ft)
- Highest elevation: 270 m (890 ft)
- Lowest elevation: 134 m (440 ft)
- Population (2023): 364
  - Density: 24.9/km^{2} (64.4/sq mi)
- Time zone: UTC+01:00 (CET)
  - Summer (DST): UTC+02:00 (CEST)
- INSEE/Postal code: 28111 /28330
- ^{1} French Land Register data, which excludes lakes, ponds, glaciers > 1 km^{2} (0.386 sq mi or 247 acres) and river estuaries.

Coudray-au-Perche (French pronunciation: [kudʁɛ o pɛʁʃ]) is a commune in the Eure-et-Loir department in northern France.

== Population ==
Historical population
Year	Pop.	±% p.a.
1968	339	—
1975	283	−2.55%
1982	253	−1.59%
1990	276	+1.09%
1999	328	+1.94%
2007	367	+1.41%
2012	380	+0.70%
2017	341	−2.14%
2023	364	+1.09%
Source: INSEE

== See also ==
- Communes of the Eure-et-Loir department
