= Les Étilleux =

- Commune
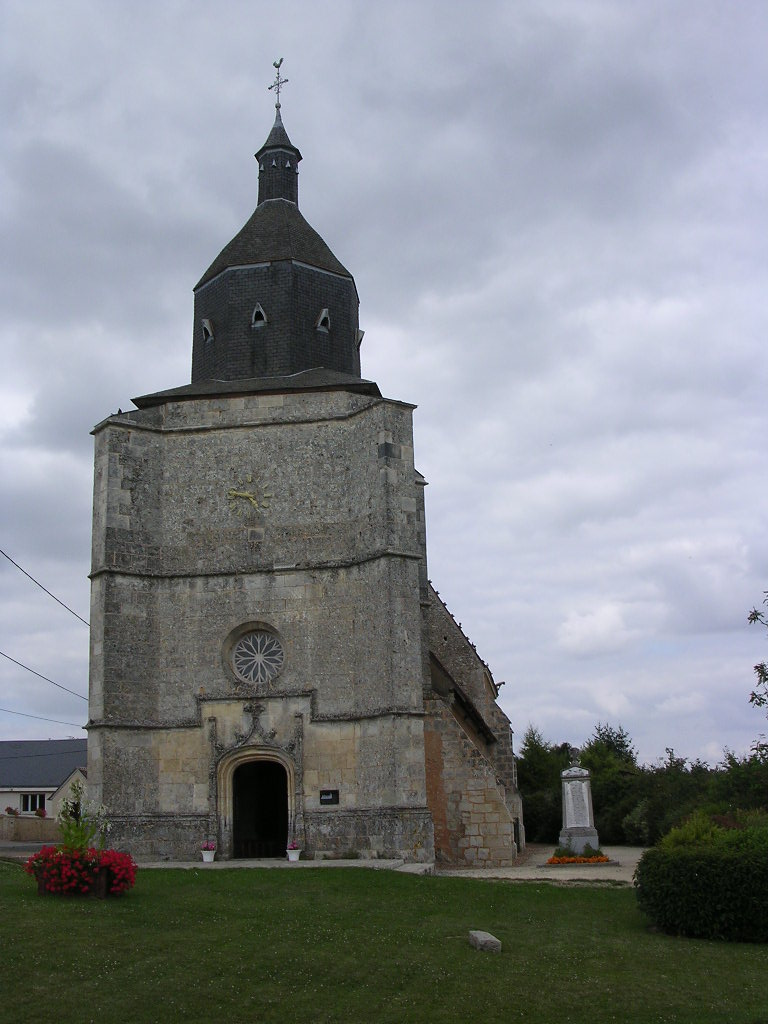
- The church in Les Étilleux
- Location of Les Étilleux
- Location within France Location within Centre-Val de Loire
- Coordinates: 48°14′05″N 0°49′26″E
- Country: France
- Region: Centre-Val de Loire
- Department: Eure-et-Loir
- Arrondissement: Nogent-le-Rotrou
- Canton: Brou
- Intercommunality: CC du Perche

Government
  - Mayor (2020–2026): Rudy Buard
- Area^{1}: 8.35 km^{2} (3.22 sq mi)
- Elevation: 270 m (890 ft)
- Highest elevation: 265 m (869 ft)
- Lowest elevation: 162 m (531 ft)
- Population (2023): 204
  - Density: 24.4/km^{2} (63.3/sq mi)
- Time zone: UTC+01:00 (CET)
  - Summer (DST): UTC+02:00 (CEST)
- INSEE/Postal code: 28144 /28330
- ^{1} French Land Register data, which excludes lakes, ponds, glaciers > 1 km^{2} (0.386 sq mi or 247 acres) and river estuaries.

Les Étilleux (French pronunciation: [le.z‿etijø]) is a commune in the Eure-et-Loir department and Centre-Val de Loire region of north-central France. It lies 55 km west-south-west of Chartres and some 130 km from Paris.

== Population ==
Historical population
| Year | Pop. | ±% p.a. |
|---|---|---|
| 1968 | 233 | — |
| 1975 | 200 | −2.16% |
| 1982 | 168 | −2.46% |
| 1990 | 184 | +1.14% |
| 1999 | 188 | +0.24% |
| 2007 | 203 | +0.96% |
| 2012 | 244 | +3.75% |
| 2017 | 221 | −1.96% |
| 2023 | 204 | −1.33% |
Source: INSEE

== See also ==
- Communes of the Eure-et-Loir department
