= Suburbicon (soundtrack) =

Suburbicon (Original Motion Picture Soundtrack)

Film score by Alexandre Desplat
- Released: October 27, 2017
- Recorded: 2017
- Genre: Film score
- Length: 67:31
- Label: ABKCO

Alexandre Desplat chronology
The Shape of Water (2017)	Suburbicon (2017)	Based on a True Story (2017)

Suburbicon (Original Motion Picture Soundtrack) is the soundtrack to the 2018 film Suburbicon directed by George Clooney and featured musical score composed by Alexandre Desplat. The film is Clooney's third collaboration with Desplat after The Ides of March (2011) and The Monuments Men (2014). ABKCO Records distributed the soundtrack and released day-and-date with the film on October 27, 2017.

== Critical reception ==
Brian Tallerico of RogerEbert.com described the score to be aesthetically "overdone", and Justin Chang of Los Angeles Times called it as jaunty and overbearing. Ann Hornaday of The Washington Post described it as "marvelous". David Rooney of The Hollywood Reporter wrote "Alexandre Desplat's score works overtime, shifting from sleepy cocktail jazz into needling agitation before pulling out all the stops and going the full Bernard Herrmann." David Edelstein of Vulture wrote "Alexandre Desplat whips up Bernard Herrmann–esque storms and tries to tie it all together musically. But not even Mahler could bring order to such a ramshackle structure." Alonso Duralde of TheWrap wrote that "Composer Alexandre Desplat channels Bernard Herrmann as hard as he can to provide this movie with some genuinely suspenseful underpinnings, but the music winds up offering far more than the film can handle."

Ed Gibbs of Little White Lies called it as "a strong score from Alexandre Desplat". Sean Wilson of MFiles called it as "a darkly comic score that both honours its soundtrack predecessors and carves out highly entertaining territory of its own." Hugh Oxlade of Varsity wrote "Alexandre Desplat's mix of propulsive, Looney Tunes-style pounding and genteel jazz imbues sections of the film with tremendous pep and vigour, and others with deliciously cool irony." Fionnuala Halligan of Screen International wrote "Alexandre Desplat's jaunty score helps keep the period mood bubble in place even when the going gets significantly tougher." In contrast, Charlotte O'Sullivan of Evening Standard wrote "Alexandre Desplat's soundtrack is overwrought, and paying homage to Psycho is a particularly bad move."

== Track listing ==
Suburbicon (Original Motion Picture Soundtrack) track listing
No.	Title	Length
1.	"Welcome to Suburbicon"	2:04
2.	"Friends"	3:07
3.	"When I Fall in Love"	2:05
4.	"A Prayer for Rose"	4:54
5.	"7000 Apples"	2:15
6.	"Men in the House"	7:08
7.	"Bud Cooper"	1:54
8.	"The Line Up"	4:23
9.	"A Sweet Aroma"	2:31
10.	"We'll Go to Aruba"	1:47
11.	"What Did You Do?"	1:29
12.	"Mrs. Lodge Called"	1:53
13.	"Something Sad"	1:56
14.	"Blonde"	1:31
15.	"Basement Games"	2:04
16.	"Closet Conversation"	3:20
17.	"Unlucky Bud"	2:00
18.	"Falling Apart"	4:12
19.	"Nicky Trapped"	5:48
20.	"Aftermath"	3:16
21.	"Sunday in Suburbicon"	3:39
22.	"Playing Catch in the Sun"	3:36
23.	"Suburbicon Good Night"	0:39
Total length:		67:31

== Personnel ==
Credits adapted from liner notes.

- Alexandre Desplat – composer, conductor, liner notes
- Alisa Coleman – executive producer
- Allen Hoist – saxophone
- Anthony Kott – music co-ordinator
- Carmine Lauri – orchestra leader
- Claude Romano – music preparation
- Conard Pope – orchestration
- Dave Arch – piano
- David Hage – music preparation
- Frederic Gaillardet – piano
- Huw Davies – guitar
- Jake Parker – music preparation
- Jason Richmond – music co-ordinator
- Jean-Pascal Beintus – orchestration
- Jeff Boudreaux – drums
- Kirsty Whalley – mixing
- London Symphony Orchestra – orchestra
- Nicolas Charron – orchestration
- Norbert Vergonjanne – music preparation
- Peter Clarke – supervising music editor
- Peter Cobbin – recording, mixing
- Randy Spendlove – executive in charge of music
- Riccardo del Fra – bass
- Romain Allender – musical assistance, programming
- Sylvain Morizet – orchestration
- Teri Landi – producer
- Xavier Forcioli – executive producer, programming
