= Chapelle-Royale =

- Commune
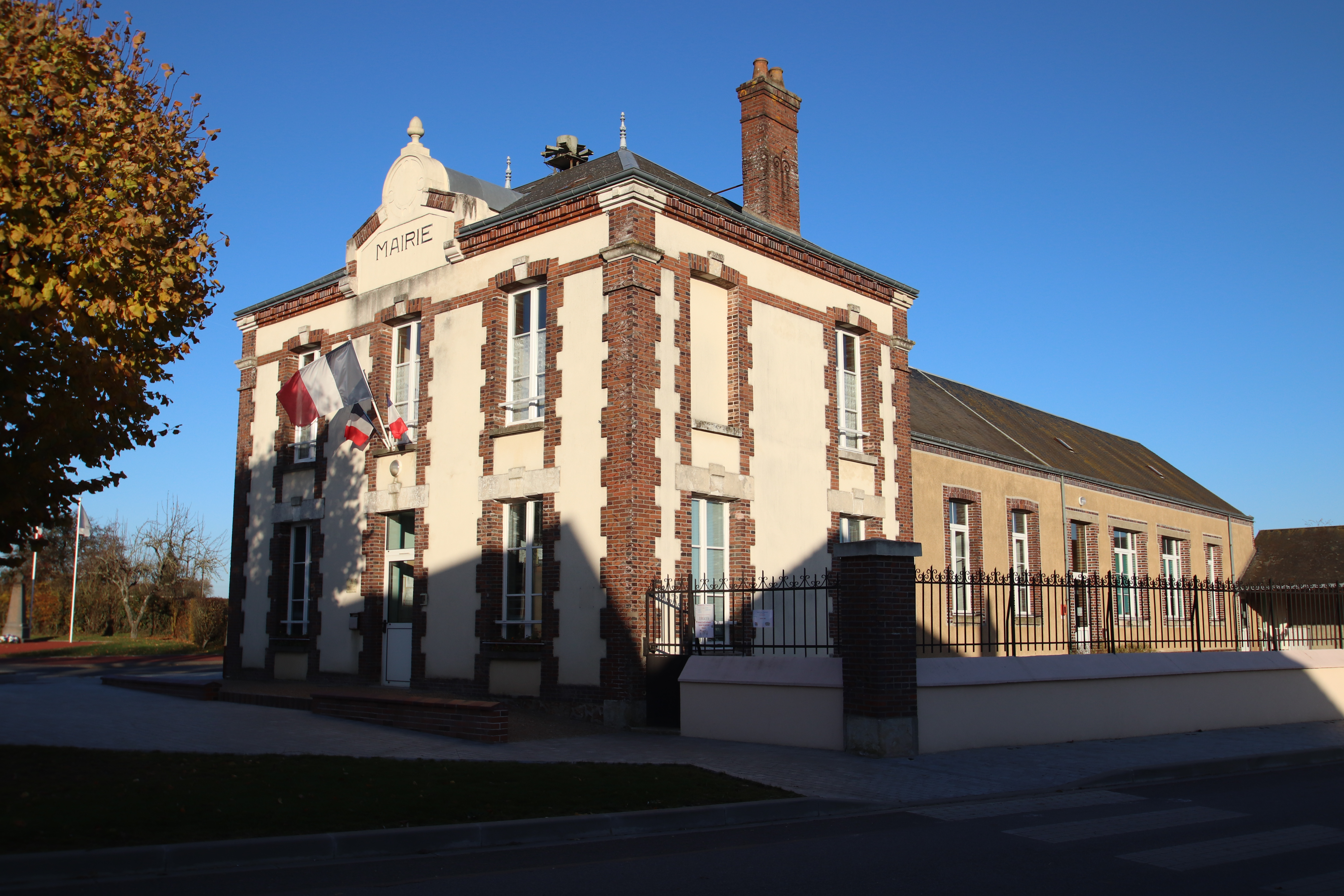
- The town hall in Chapelle-Royale
- Location of Chapelle-Royale
- Location within France Location within Centre-Val de Loire
- Coordinates: 48°08′42″N 1°03′05″E
- Country: France
- Region: Centre-Val de Loire
- Department: Eure-et-Loir
- Arrondissement: Nogent-le-Rotrou
- Canton: Brou

Government
  - Mayor (2020–2026): Thomas Blonsky
- Area^{1}: 9.89 km^{2} (3.82 sq mi)
- Elevation: 174 m (571 ft)
- Highest elevation: 192 m (630 ft)
- Lowest elevation: 158 m (518 ft)
- Population (2023): 333
  - Density: 33.7/km^{2} (87.2/sq mi)
- Time zone: UTC+01:00 (CET)
  - Summer (DST): UTC+02:00 (CEST)
- INSEE/Postal code: 28079 /28290
- ^{1} French Land Register data, which excludes lakes, ponds, glaciers > 1 km^{2} (0.386 sq mi or 247 acres) and river estuaries.

Chapelle-Royale (French pronunciation: [ʃapɛl ʁwajal]) is a commune in the Eure-et-Loir department in northern France.

== Population ==
Historical population
Year	Pop.	±% p.a.
1968	450	—
1975	430	−0.65%
1982	378	−1.82%
1990	368	−0.33%
1999	339	−0.91%
2007	360	+0.75%
2012	319	−2.39%
2017	307	−0.76%
2023	333	+1.36%
Source: INSEE

== See also ==
- Communes of the Eure-et-Loir department
