= Saint-Bomer =

Saint-Boomer
- Commune
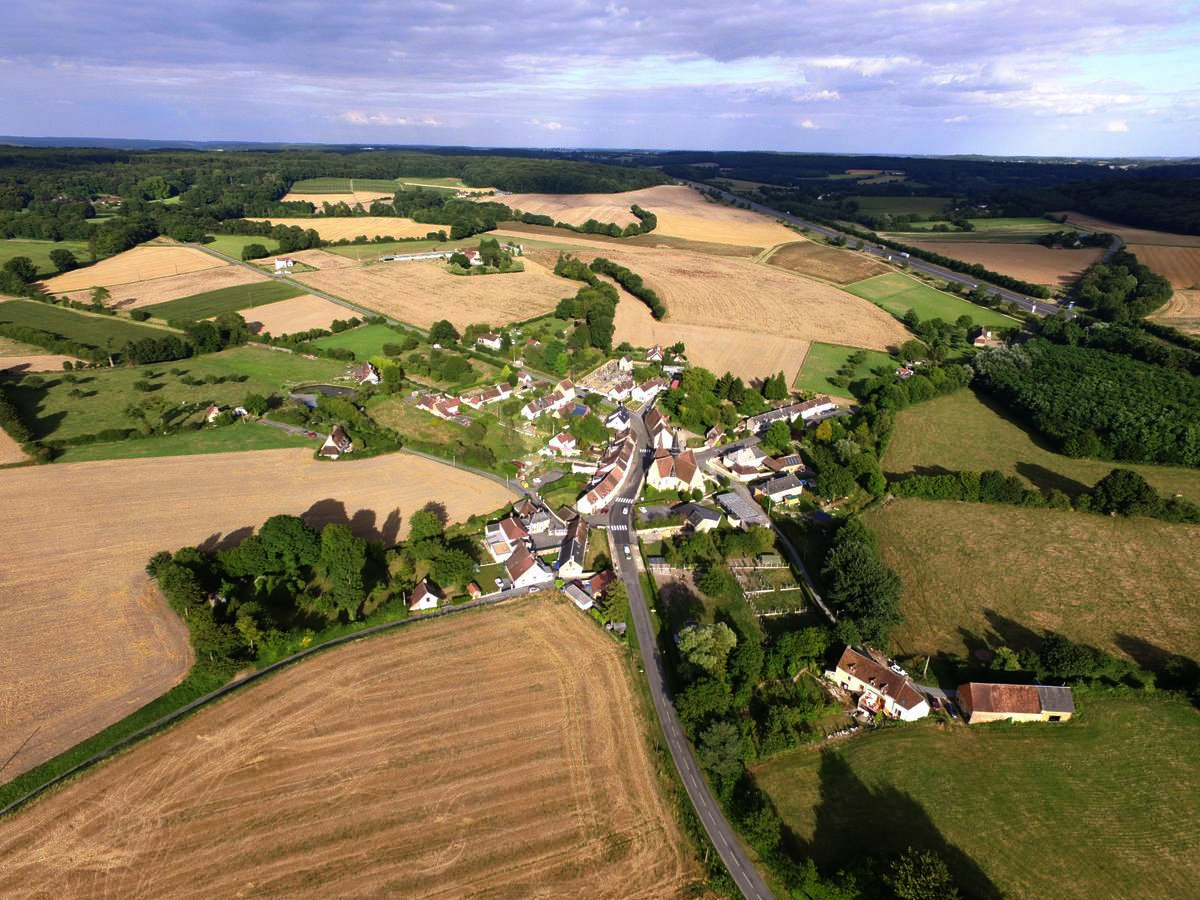
- An aerial view of Saint-Bomer
- Location of Saint-Boomer
- Location within France Location within Centre-Val de Loire
- Coordinates: 48°11′46″N 0°49′43″E
- Country: France
- Region: Centre-Val de Loire
- Department: Eure-et-Loir
- Arrondissement: Nogent-le-Rotrou
- Canton: Brou
- Intercommunality: Perche

Government
  - Mayor (2020–2026): Jean Albert Bassoulet
- Area^{1}: 13.32 km^{2} (5.14 sq mi)
- Elevation: 193 m (633 ft)
- Highest elevation: 271 m (889 ft)
- Lowest elevation: 163 m (535 ft)
- Population (2023): 194
  - Density: 14.6/km^{2} (37.7/sq mi)
- Time zone: UTC+01:00 (CET)
  - Summer (DST): UTC+02:00 (CEST)
- INSEE/Postal code: 28327 /28330
- ^{1} French Land Register data, which excludes lakes, ponds, glaciers > 1 km^{2} (0.386 sq mi or 247 acres) and river estuaries.

Saint-Bomer is a commune in the Eure-et-Loir department in northern France.

== Population ==
Historical population
Year	Pop.	±% p.a.
1968	202	—
1975	195	−0.50%
1982	160	−2.79%
1990	143	−1.39%
1999	178	+2.46%
2007	199	+1.40%
2012	211	+1.18%
2017	196	−1.46%
2023	194	−0.17%
Source: INSEE

== See also ==
- Communes of the Eure-et-Loir department
