= Mézières-au-Perche =

- Part of Dangeau
- Location of Mézières-au-Perche
- Location within France Location within Centre-Val de Loire
- Coordinates: 48°15′02″N 1°16′33″E
- Country: France
- Region: Centre-Val de Loire
- Department: Eure-et-Loir
- Arrondissement: Châteaudun
- Canton: Brou
- Commune: Dangeau
- Area^{1}: 6.11 km^{2} (2.36 sq mi)
- Elevation: 150 m (490 ft)
- Highest elevation: 165 m (541 ft)
- Lowest elevation: 136 m (446 ft)
- Population (2015): 133
  - Density: 21.8/km^{2} (56.4/sq mi)
- Time zone: UTC+01:00 (CET)
  - Summer (DST): UTC+02:00 (CEST)
- Postal code: 28160
- ^{1} French Land Register data, which excludes lakes, ponds, glaciers > 1 km^{2} (0.386 sq mi or 247 acres) and river estuaries.

Mézières-au-Perche (French pronunciation: [mezjɛʁ o pɛʁʃ]) is a former commune in the Eure-et-Loir department in northern France. On 1 January 2018, it was merged into the commune of Dangeau.

== See also ==
- Communes of the Eure-et-Loir department
