= Moulhard =

- Commune
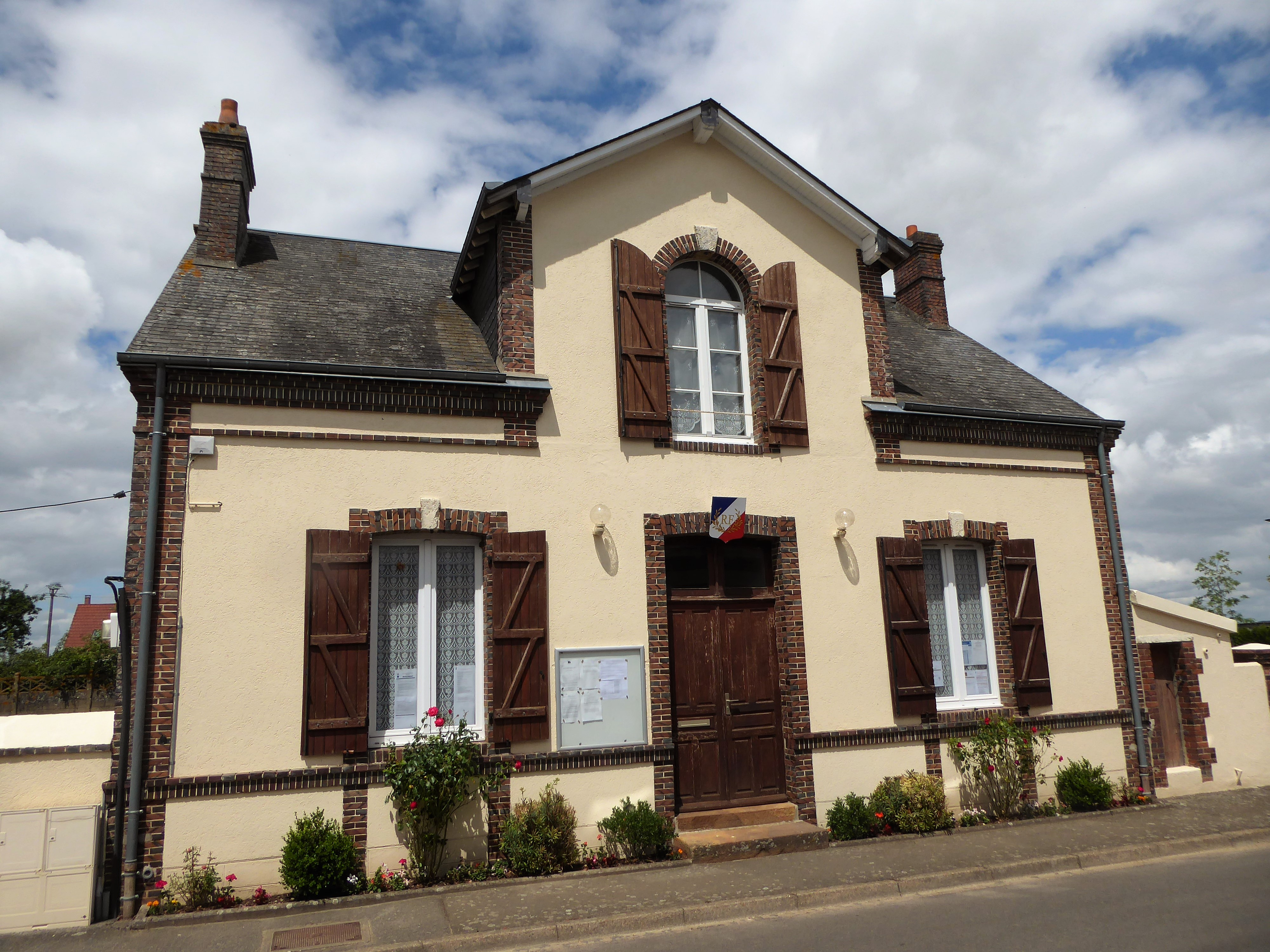
- Town hall
- Location of Moulhard
- Location within France Location within Centre-Val de Loire
- Coordinates: 48°12′33″N 1°02′45″E
- Country: France
- Region: Centre-Val de Loire
- Department: Eure-et-Loir
- Arrondissement: Nogent-le-Rotrou
- Canton: Brou

Government
  - Mayor (2020–2026): Didier Neveu
- Area^{1}: 11.17 km^{2} (4.31 sq mi)
- Elevation: 189 m (620 ft)
- Highest elevation: 237 m (778 ft)
- Lowest elevation: 169 m (554 ft)
- Population (2023): 139
  - Density: 12.4/km^{2} (32.2/sq mi)
- Time zone: UTC+01:00 (CET)
  - Summer (DST): UTC+02:00 (CEST)
- INSEE/Postal code: 28273 /28160
- ^{1} French Land Register data, which excludes lakes, ponds, glaciers > 1 km^{2} (0.386 sq mi or 247 acres) and river estuaries.

Moulhard (French pronunciation: [mulaʁ]) is a commune in the Eure-et-Loir department in northern France.

== Geography ==
Moulhard is located in the canton of Authon-du-Perche within the Perche Gouët area. It is 60 km south west of Chartres and 82 km north east of Le Mans on the A11.

== History ==
Moulhard is an agricultural settlement which traces its history back to the year 810 when it was known as Villa Molevardi. Moulhard is on the route of a Roman road running from Chartres to Le Mans; it was a main route up to the 18th century, known as Caesar's way or Henri IV's way.

== Attractions ==
The church of Notre-Dame takes part in the annual pilgrimage of Saint Marcou on 1 May.

== Population ==
Historical population
Year	Pop.	±% p.a.
1968	213	—
1975	207	−0.41%
1982	172	−2.61%
1990	151	−1.61%
1999	142	−0.68%
2007	155	+1.10%
2012	153	−0.26%
2017	142	−1.48%
2023	139	−0.36%
Source: INSEE

== See also ==
- Communes of the Eure-et-Loir department
