= Frazé =

- Commune
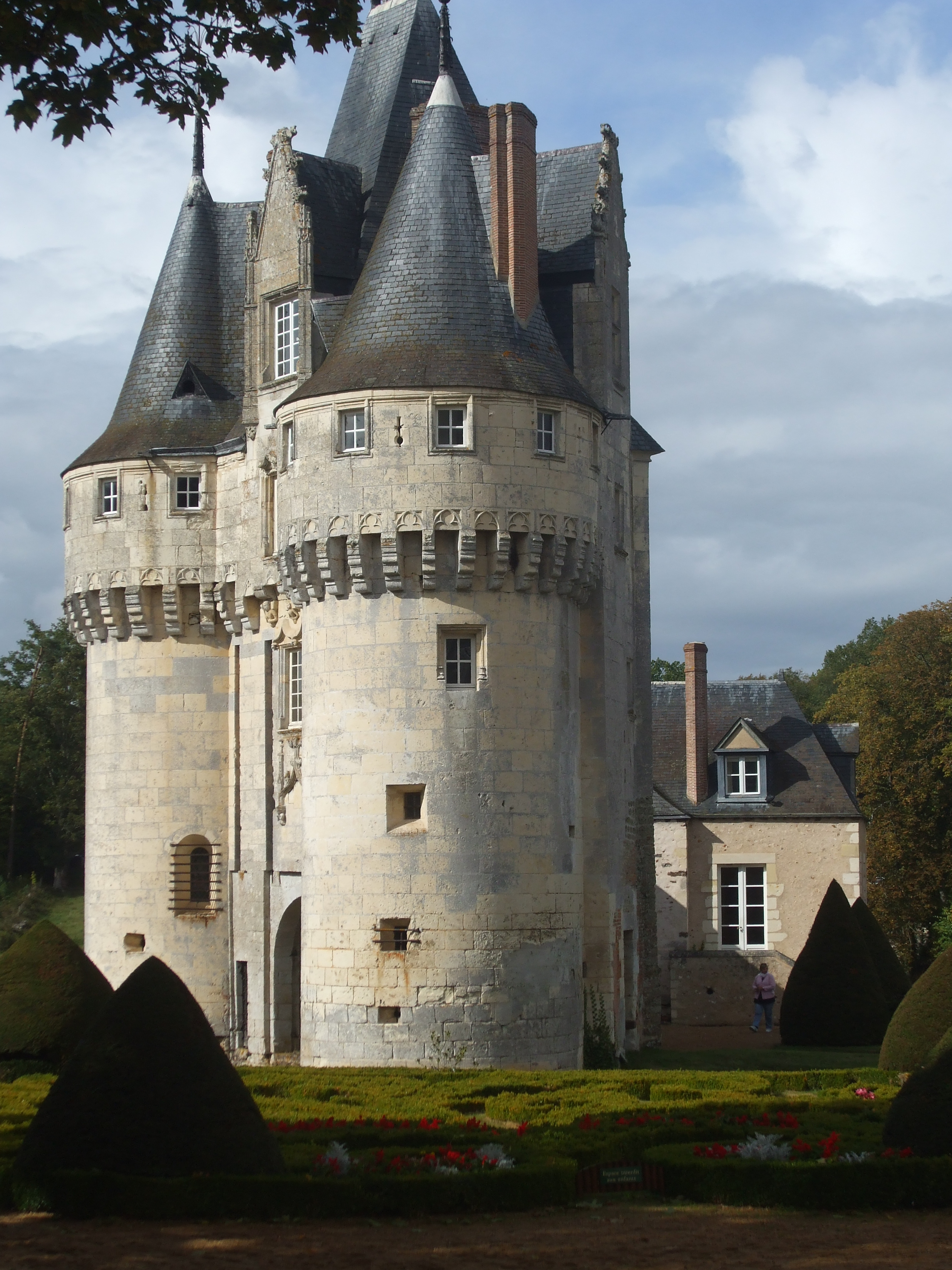
- The chateau in Frazé
- Location of Frazé
- Location within France Location within Centre-Val de Loire
- Coordinates: 48°15′44″N 1°06′01″E
- Country: France
- Region: Centre-Val de Loire
- Department: Eure-et-Loir
- Arrondissement: Nogent-le-Rotrou
- Canton: Brou

Government
  - Mayor (2025–2026): Fabrice Cuvier
- Area^{1}: 27.55 km^{2} (10.64 sq mi)
- Elevation: 204 m (669 ft)
- Highest elevation: 233 m (764 ft)
- Lowest elevation: 167 m (548 ft)
- Population (2023): 482
  - Density: 17.5/km^{2} (45.3/sq mi)
- Time zone: UTC+01:00 (CET)
  - Summer (DST): UTC+02:00 (CEST)
- INSEE/Postal code: 28161 /28160
- ^{1} French Land Register data, which excludes lakes, ponds, glaciers > 1 km^{2} (0.386 sq mi or 247 acres) and river estuaries.

Frazé (French pronunciation: [fʁaze]) is a commune in the Eure-et-Loir department in northern France.

== Population ==
Historical population
Year	Pop.	±% p.a.
1968	605	—
1975	481	−3.22%
1982	418	−1.99%
1990	489	+1.98%
1999	493	+0.09%
2007	517	+0.60%
2012	510	−0.27%
2017	505	−0.20%
2023	482	−0.77%
Source: INSEE

== See also ==
- Communes of the Eure-et-Loir department
