= Dampierre-sous-Brou =

- Commune
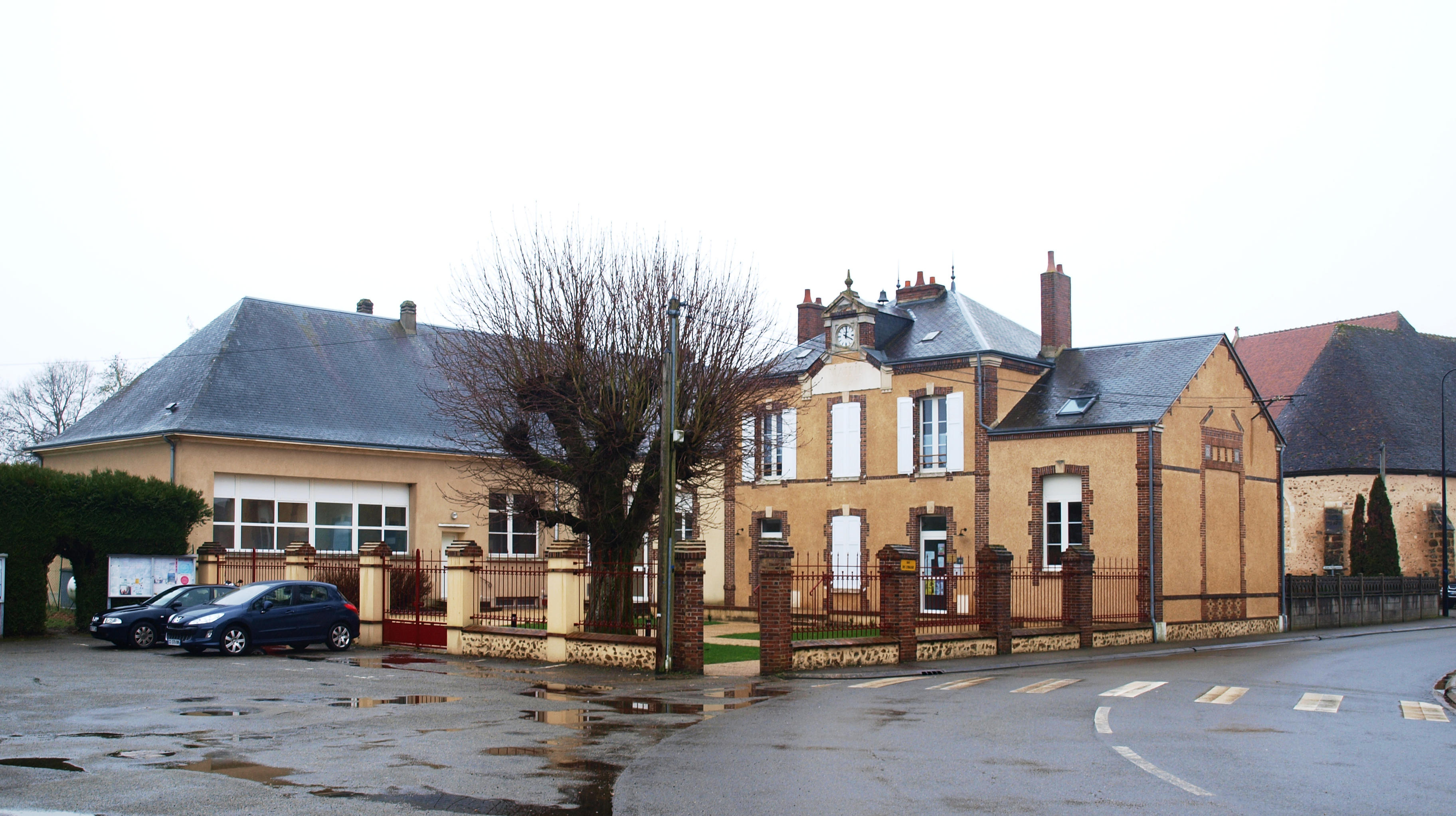
- The town hall in Dampierre-sous-Brou
- Location of Dampierre-sous-Brou
- Location within France Location within Centre-Val de Loire
- Coordinates: 48°12′51″N 1°06′48″E
- Country: France
- Region: Centre-Val de Loire
- Department: Eure-et-Loir
- Arrondissement: Châteaudun
- Canton: Brou
- Intercommunality: Grand Châteaudun

Government
  - Mayor (2020–2026): Tony Leverd
- Area^{1}: 14.56 km^{2} (5.62 sq mi)
- Elevation: 160 m (520 ft)
- Highest elevation: 227 m (745 ft)
- Lowest elevation: 152 m (499 ft)
- Population (2023): 443
  - Density: 30.4/km^{2} (78.8/sq mi)
- Time zone: UTC+01:00 (CET)
  - Summer (DST): UTC+02:00 (CEST)
- INSEE/Postal code: 28123 /28160
- ^{1} French Land Register data, which excludes lakes, ponds, glaciers > 1 km^{2} (0.386 sq mi or 247 acres) and river estuaries.

Dampierre-sous-Brou (French pronunciation: [dɑ̃pjɛʁ su bʁu], literally Dampierre under Brou) is a commune in the Eure-et-Loir department in northern France.

== Population ==
Historical population
Year	Pop.	±% p.a.
1968	430	—
1975	440	+0.33%
1982	473	+1.04%
1990	472	−0.03%
1999	446	−0.63%
2007	471	+0.68%
2012	510	+1.60%
2017	461	−2.00%
2023	443	−0.66%
Source: INSEE

== See also ==
- Communes of the Eure-et-Loir department
