= Loir =

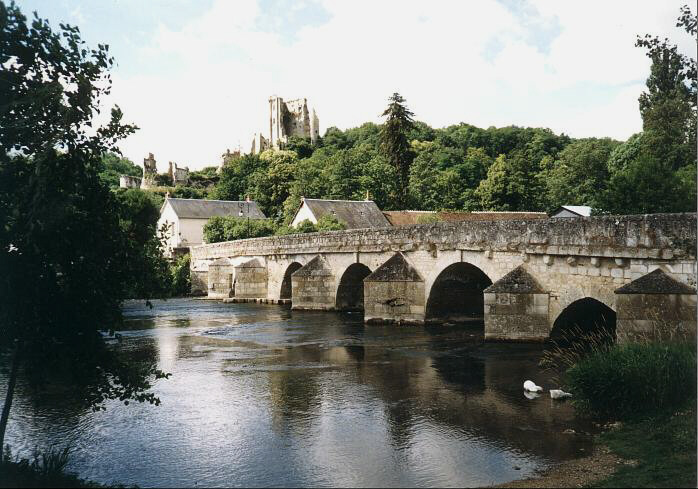
- The Loir in Lavardin

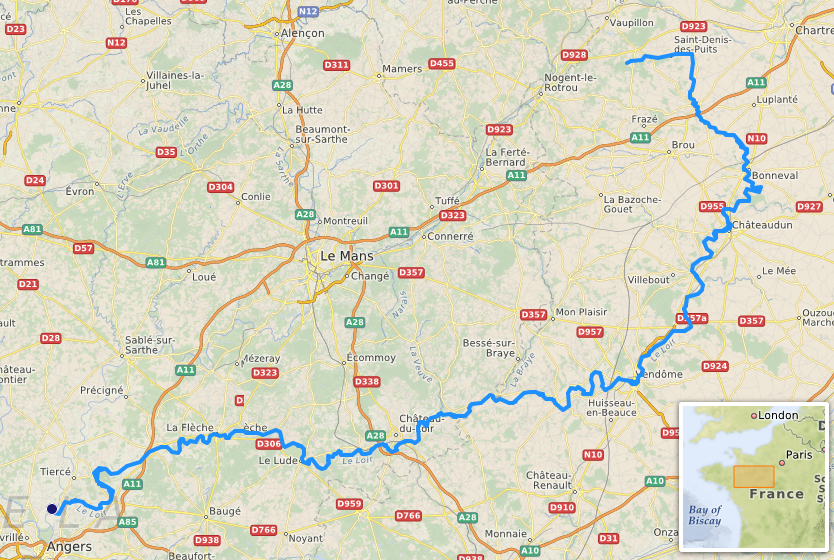
- Etymology: From Gaulish ledo, "flow"
- Nickname: Loir sans E ("Loir-without-E")
- Native name: Le Loir (French)

Location
- Country: France

Physical characteristics
- Source
  - location: Perche
  - elevation: 150 m (490 ft)
- Mouth
  - location: Sarthe
  - coordinates: 47°33′27″N 0°31′35″W
- Length: 319 km (198 mi)
- Basin size: 8,270 km^{2} (3,190 mi^{2})
- Discharge
  - average: 33 m^{3}/s (1,200 cu ft/s)

Basin features
- Progression: Sarthe→ Maine→ Loire→ Atlantic Ocean

The Loir is a 319 km (198 mi) long river in western France. It is a left tributary of the Sarthe. Its source is in the Eure-et-Loir department, north of Illiers-Combray. It joins the river Sarthe in Briollay, north of the city of Angers.

It is indirectly a tributary of the Loire, and runs roughly parallel to it and slightly north of it for much of its length, and so might be regarded as a Yazoo type river.

== Tributaries ==
- Ozanne
- Yerre
- Braye
- Aigre
- Conie
