= Montigny-le-Chartif =

- Commune
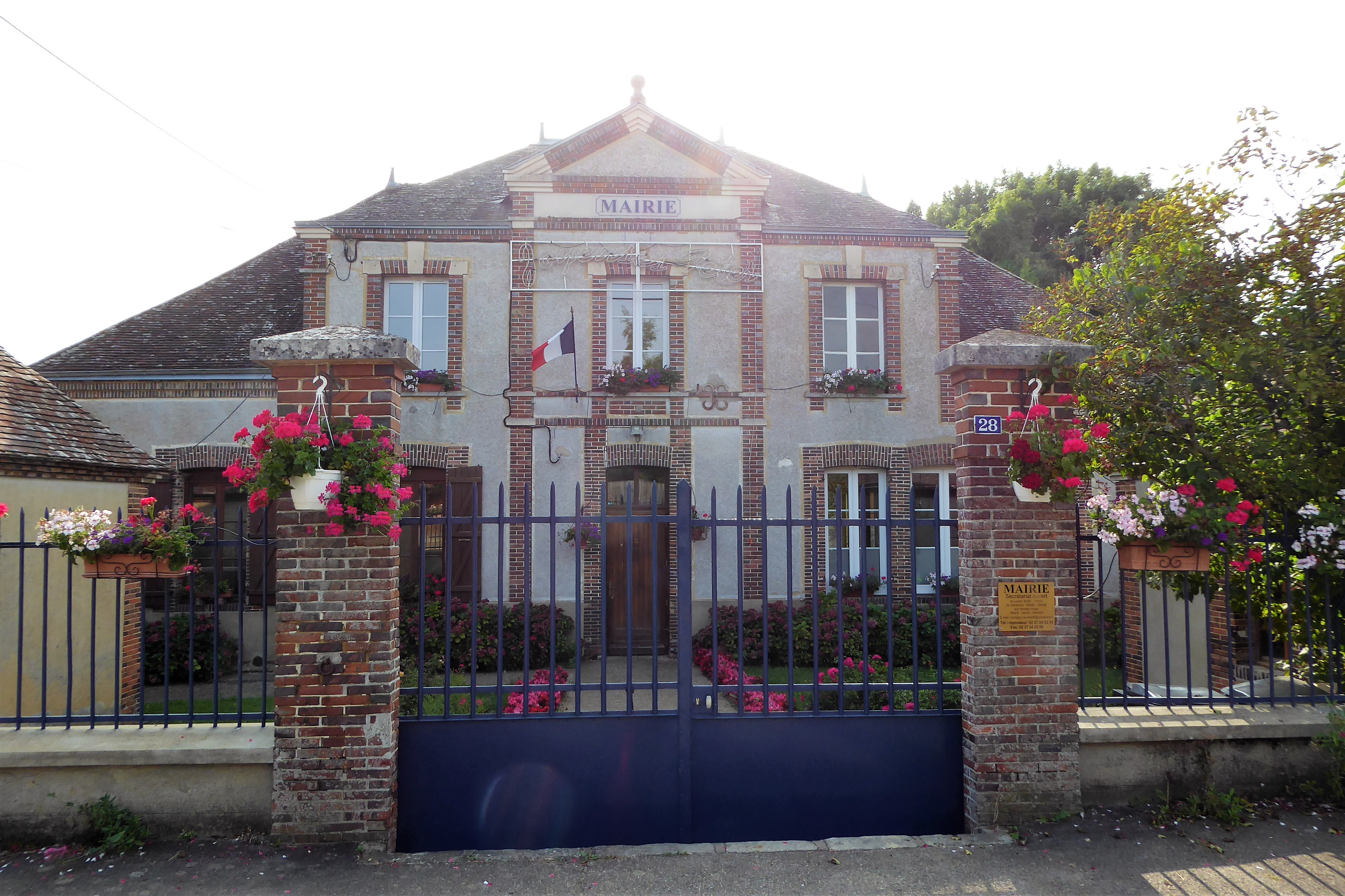
- The town hall in Montigny-le-Chartif

- Coat of arms
- Location of Montigny-le-Chartif
- Location within France Location within Centre-Val de Loire
- Coordinates: 48°17′11″N 1°09′19″E
- Country: France
- Region: Centre-Val de Loire
- Department: Eure-et-Loir
- Arrondissement: Nogent-le-Rotrou
- Canton: Brou

Government
  - Mayor (2020–2026): Joël Fauquet
- Area^{1}: 25.96 km^{2} (10.02 sq mi)
- Highest elevation: 229 m (751 ft)
- Lowest elevation: 163 m (535 ft)
- Population (2023): 586
  - Density: 22.6/km^{2} (58.5/sq mi)
- Time zone: UTC+01:00 (CET)
  - Summer (DST): UTC+02:00 (CEST)
- INSEE/Postal code: 28261 /28120
- ^{1} French Land Register data, which excludes lakes, ponds, glaciers > 1 km^{2} (0.386 sq mi or 247 acres) and river estuaries.

Montigny-le-Chartif (French pronunciation: [mɔ̃tiɲi lə ʃaʁtif]) is a commune in the Eure-et-Loir department in northern France.

== Population ==
Historical population
Year	Pop.	±% p.a.
1968	542	—
1975	525	−0.45%
1982	498	−0.75%
1990	462	−0.93%
1999	453	−0.22%
2007	537	+2.15%
2012	643	+3.67%
2017	615	−0.89%
2023	586	−0.80%
Source: INSEE

== See also ==
- Communes of the Eure-et-Loir department
