= Mottereau =

- Commune
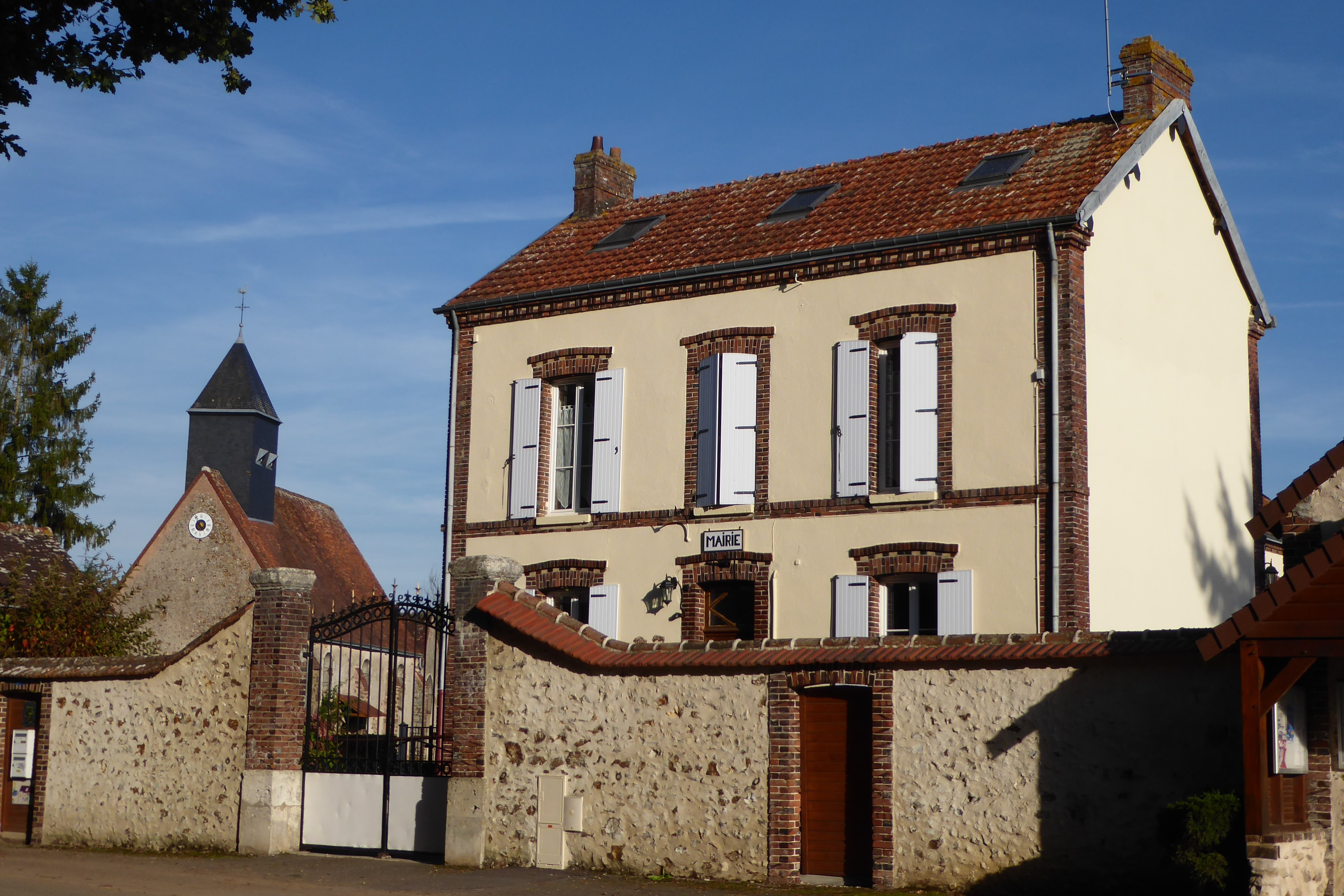
- The town hall in Mottereau
- Location of Mottereau
- Location within France Location within Centre-Val de Loire
- Coordinates: 48°15′21″N 1°10′43″E
- Country: France
- Region: Centre-Val de Loire
- Department: Eure-et-Loir
- Arrondissement: Châteaudun
- Canton: Brou

Government
  - Mayor (2020–2026): Patrick Martin
- Area^{1}: 8.79 km^{2} (3.39 sq mi)
- Elevation: 166 m (545 ft)
- Highest elevation: 202 m (663 ft)
- Lowest elevation: 157 m (515 ft)
- Population (2023): 152
  - Density: 17.3/km^{2} (44.8/sq mi)
- Time zone: UTC+01:00 (CET)
  - Summer (DST): UTC+02:00 (CEST)
- INSEE/Postal code: 28272 /28160
- ^{1} French Land Register data, which excludes lakes, ponds, glaciers > 1 km^{2} (0.386 sq mi or 247 acres) and river estuaries.

Mottereau (French pronunciation: [mɔtʁo]) is a commune in the Eure-et-Loir department in northern France.

== Population ==
Historical population
Year	Pop.	±% p.a.
1968	161	—
1975	111	−5.17%
1982	118	+0.88%
1990	140	+2.16%
1999	142	+0.16%
2007	162	+1.66%
2012	160	−0.25%
2017	166	+0.74%
2023	152	−1.46%
Source: INSEE

== See also ==
- Communes of the Eure-et-Loir department
