= Dangeau =

- Commune
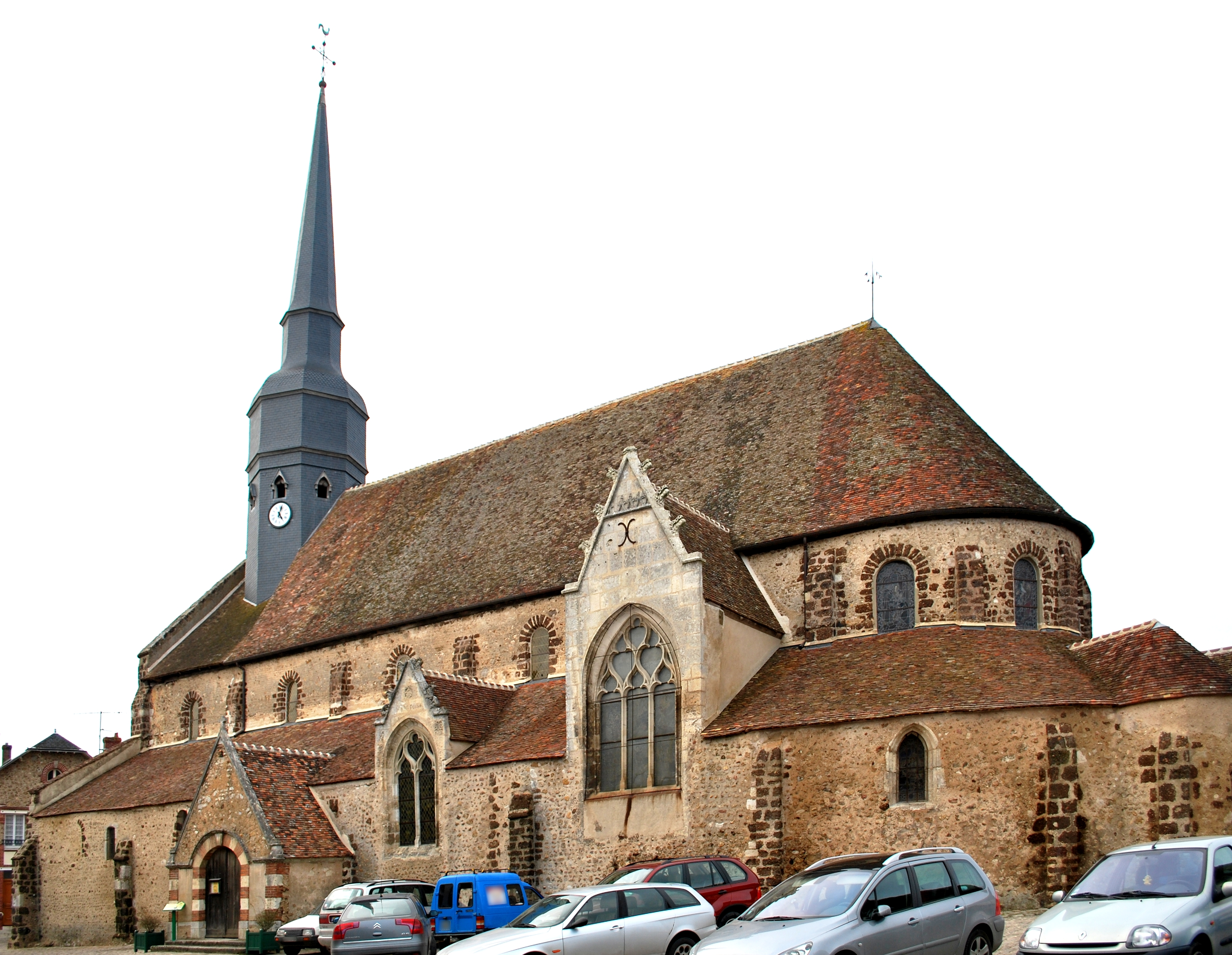
- The church in Dangeau

- Coat of arms
- Location of Dangeau
- Location within France Location within Centre-Val de Loire
- Coordinates: 48°12′33″N 1°17′09″E
- Country: France
- Region: Centre-Val de Loire
- Department: Eure-et-Loir
- Arrondissement: Châteaudun
- Canton: Châteaudun
- Intercommunality: Bonnevalais

Government
  - Mayor (2020–2026): Olivier Houdy
- Area^{1}: 54.88 km^{2} (21.19 sq mi)
- Elevation: 136 m (446 ft)
- Highest elevation: 184 m (604 ft)
- Lowest elevation: 130 m (430 ft)
- Population (2023): 1,259
  - Density: 22.94/km^{2} (59.42/sq mi)
- Time zone: UTC+01:00 (CET)
  - Summer (DST): UTC+02:00 (CEST)
- INSEE/Postal code: 28127 /28160
- ^{1} French Land Register data, which excludes lakes, ponds, glaciers > 1 km^{2} (0.386 sq mi or 247 acres) and river estuaries.

Dangeau (French pronunciation: [dɑ̃ʒo]) is a commune in the Eure-et-Loir department in northern France. On 1 January 2018, the former communes of Bullou and Mézières-au-Perche were merged into Dangeau.

== Population ==
Historical population
| Year | Pop. | ±% p.a. |
|---|---|---|
| 1968 | 1,289 | — |
| 1975 | 1,171 | −1.36% |
| 1982 | 1,062 | −1.39% |
| 1990 | 1,086 | +0.28% |
| 1999 | 1,116 | +0.30% |
| 2007 | 1,271 | +1.64% |
| 2012 | 1,333 | +0.96% |
| 2017 | 1,274 | −0.90% |
| 2023 | 1,259 | −0.20% |
Source: INSEE

== See also ==
- Communes of the Eure-et-Loir department
