= Luigny =

- Commune
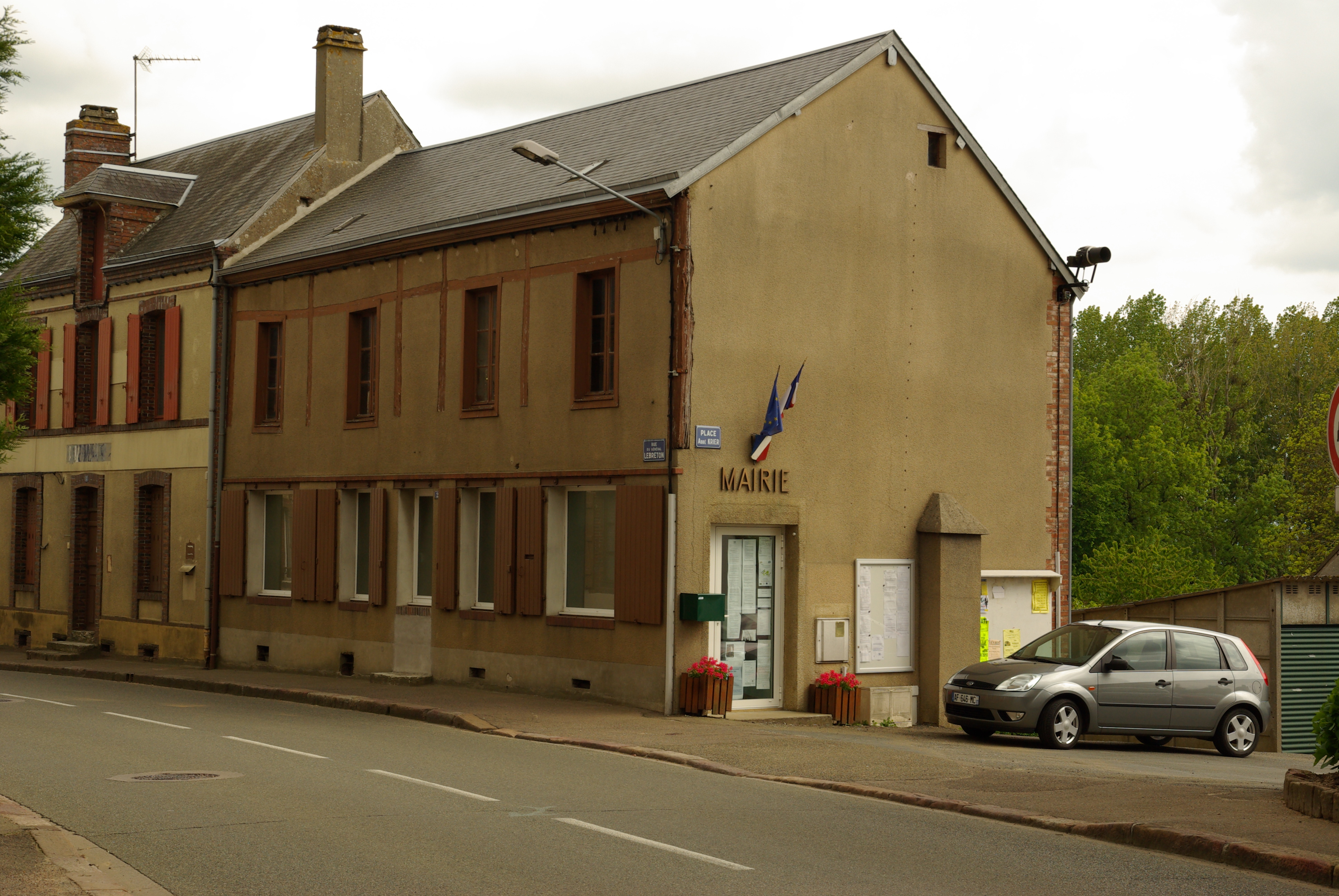
- Town hall

- Coat of arms
- Location of Luigny
- Location within France Location within Centre-Val de Loire
- Coordinates: 48°14′30″N 1°01′27″E
- Country: France
- Region: Centre-Val de Loire
- Department: Eure-et-Loir
- Arrondissement: Nogent-le-Rotrou
- Canton: Brou
- Intercommunality: Perche

Government
  - Mayor (2020–2026): Thierry Bouthier
- Area^{1}: 15.88 km^{2} (6.13 sq mi)
- Elevation: 190 m (620 ft)
- Highest elevation: 257 m (843 ft)
- Lowest elevation: 173 m (568 ft)
- Population (2023): 430
  - Density: 27/km^{2} (70/sq mi)
- Time zone: UTC+01:00 (CET)
  - Summer (DST): UTC+02:00 (CEST)
- INSEE/Postal code: 28219 /28480
- ^{1} French Land Register data, which excludes lakes, ponds, glaciers > 1 km^{2} (0.386 sq mi or 247 acres) and river estuaries.

Luigny (French pronunciation: [lɥiɲi]) is a commune in the Eure-et-Loir department in northern France.

== Population ==
Historical population
Year	Pop.	±% p.a.
1968	446	—
1975	441	−0.16%
1982	347	−3.37%
1990	342	−0.18%
1999	376	+1.06%
2007	397	+0.68%
2012	428	+1.52%
2017	342	−4.39%
2023	430	+3.89%
Source: INSEE

== See also ==
- Communes of the Eure-et-Loir department
- Perche
