= Beaumont-les-Autels =

- Commune
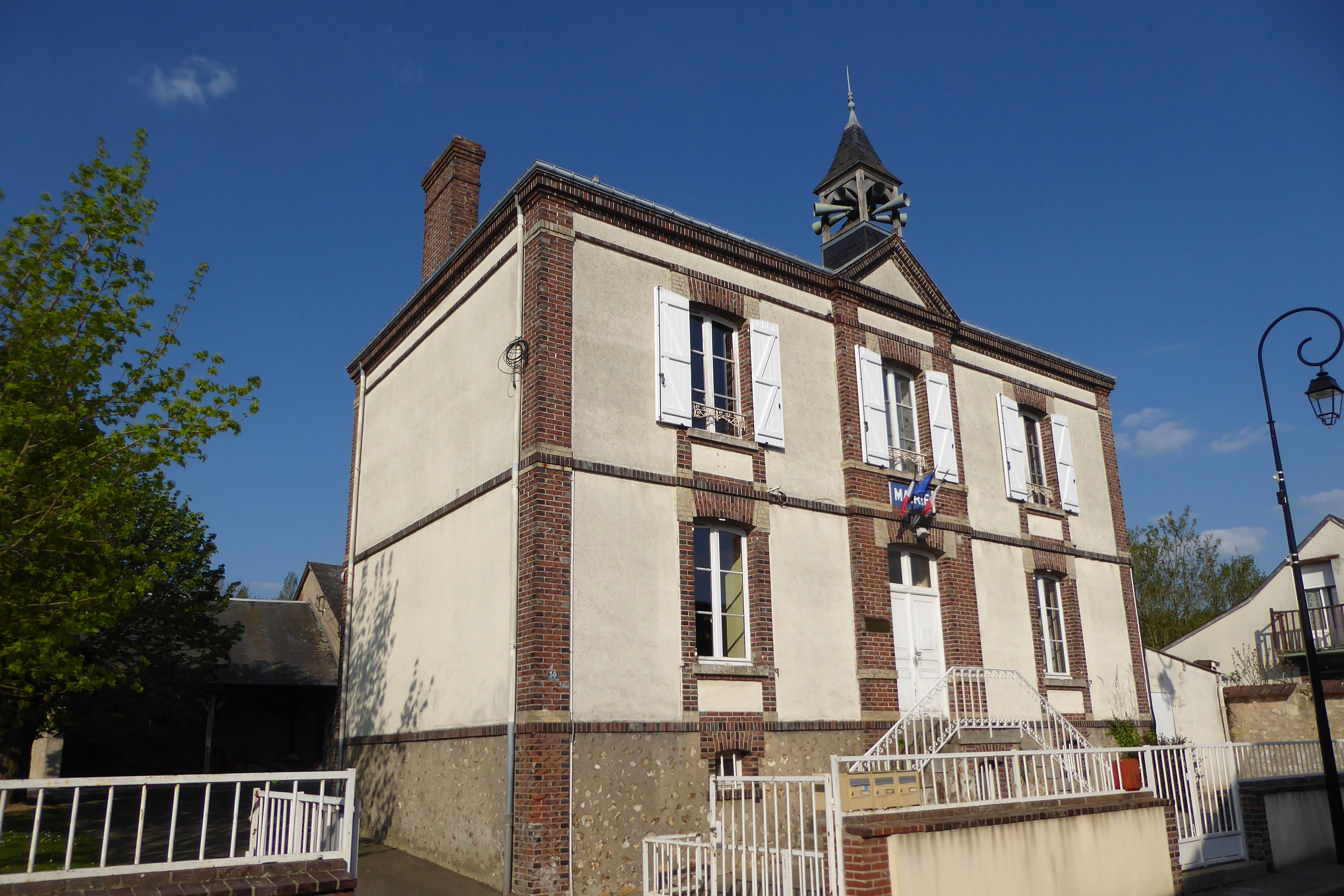
- The town hall in Beaumont-les-Autels

- Coat of arms
- Location of Beaumont-les-Autels
- Location within France Location within Centre-Val de Loire
- Coordinates: 48°15′27″N 0°57′36″E
- Country: France
- Region: Centre-Val de Loire
- Department: Eure-et-Loir
- Arrondissement: Nogent-le-Rotrou
- Canton: Brou
- Intercommunality: Perche

Government
  - Mayor (2020–2026): Michel Thibault
- Area^{1}: 20.98 km^{2} (8.10 sq mi)
- Elevation: 280 m (920 ft)
- Highest elevation: 278 m (912 ft)
- Lowest elevation: 184 m (604 ft)
- Population (2023): 438
  - Density: 20.9/km^{2} (54.1/sq mi)
- Time zone: UTC+01:00 (CET)
  - Summer (DST): UTC+02:00 (CEST)
- INSEE/Postal code: 28031 /28480
- ^{1} French Land Register data, which excludes lakes, ponds, glaciers > 1 km^{2} (0.386 sq mi or 247 acres) and river estuaries.

Beaumont-les-Autels (French pronunciation: [bomɔ̃ le.z‿otɛl]) is a commune in the Eure-et-Loir department in north-central France.

== Population ==
Historical population
Year	Pop.	±% p.a.
1968	563	—
1975	553	−0.26%
1982	508	−1.21%
1990	452	−1.45%
1999	451	−0.02%
2007	499	+1.27%
2012	436	−2.66%
2017	394	−2.01%
2023	438	+1.78%
Source: INSEE

== See also ==
- Communes of the Eure-et-Loir department
