= Gohory =

- Commune
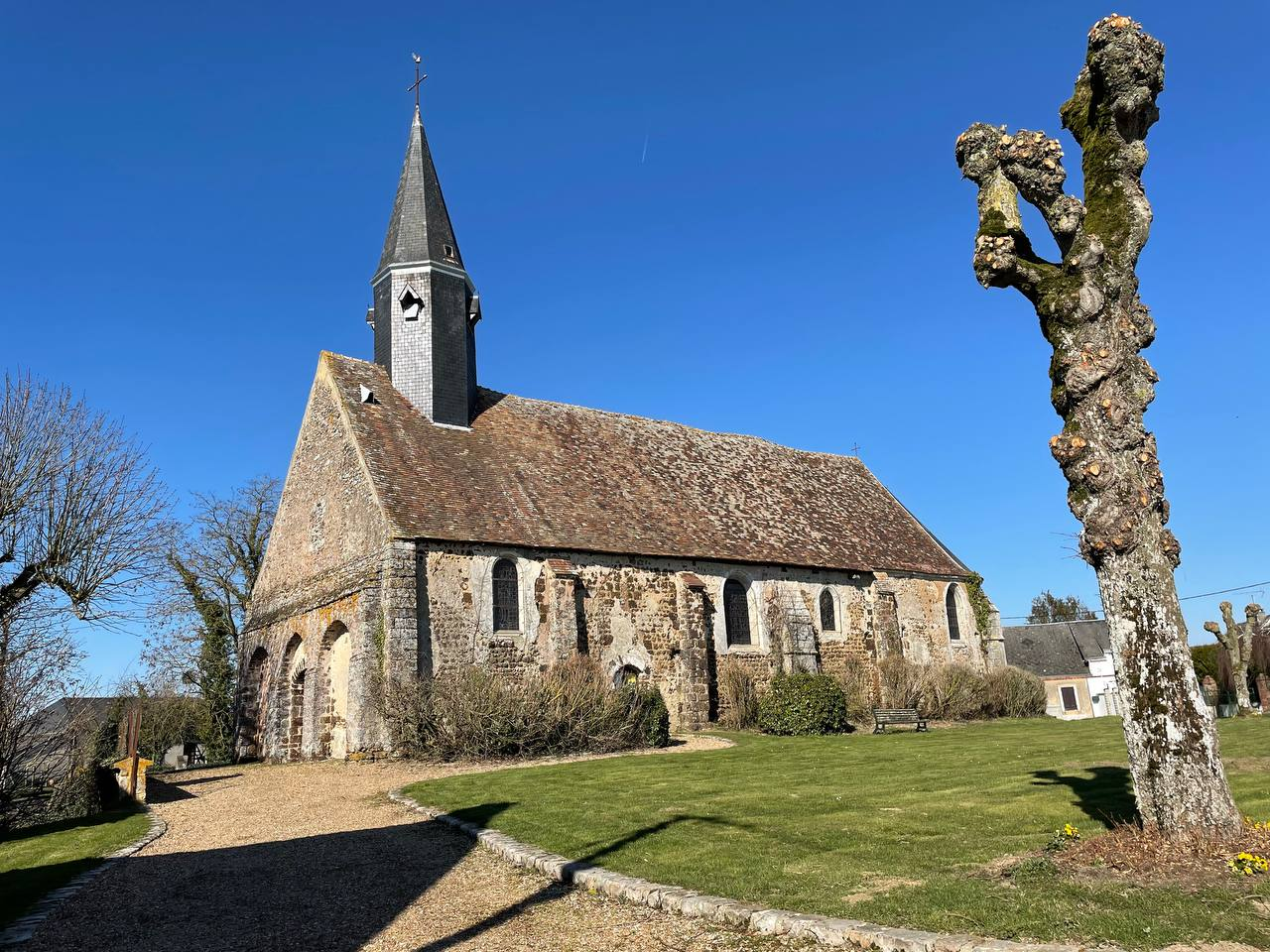
- Saint-Michel church
- Location of Gohory
- Location within France Location within Centre-Val de Loire
- Coordinates: 48°10′01″N 1°13′43″E
- Country: France
- Region: Centre-Val de Loire
- Department: Eure-et-Loir
- Arrondissement: Châteaudun
- Canton: Brou
- Intercommunality: CC du Grand Châteaudun

Government
  - Mayor (2020–2026): François Malzert
- Area^{1}: 9.47 km^{2} (3.66 sq mi)
- Elevation: 170 m (560 ft)
- Highest elevation: 180 m (590 ft)
- Lowest elevation: 161 m (528 ft)
- Population (2023): 319
  - Density: 33.7/km^{2} (87.2/sq mi)
- Time zone: UTC+01:00 (CET)
  - Summer (DST): UTC+02:00 (CEST)
- INSEE/Postal code: 28182 /28160
- ^{1} French Land Register data, which excludes lakes, ponds, glaciers > 1 km^{2} (0.386 sq mi or 247 acres) and river estuaries.

Gohory (French pronunciation: [ɡɔ.ɔʁi]) is a commune in the Eure-et-Loir department and Centre-Val de Loire region of north-central France. It lies 36 km south-west of Chartres and some 115 km from Paris.

== Population ==
Historical population
Year	Pop.	±% p.a.
1968	258	—
1975	226	−1.87%
1982	223	−0.19%
1990	234	+0.60%
1999	222	−0.58%
2007	246	+1.29%
2012	338	+6.56%
2017	323	−0.90%
2023	319	−0.21%
Source: INSEE

== See also ==
- Communes of the Eure-et-Loir department
