= Yèvres =

- Commune
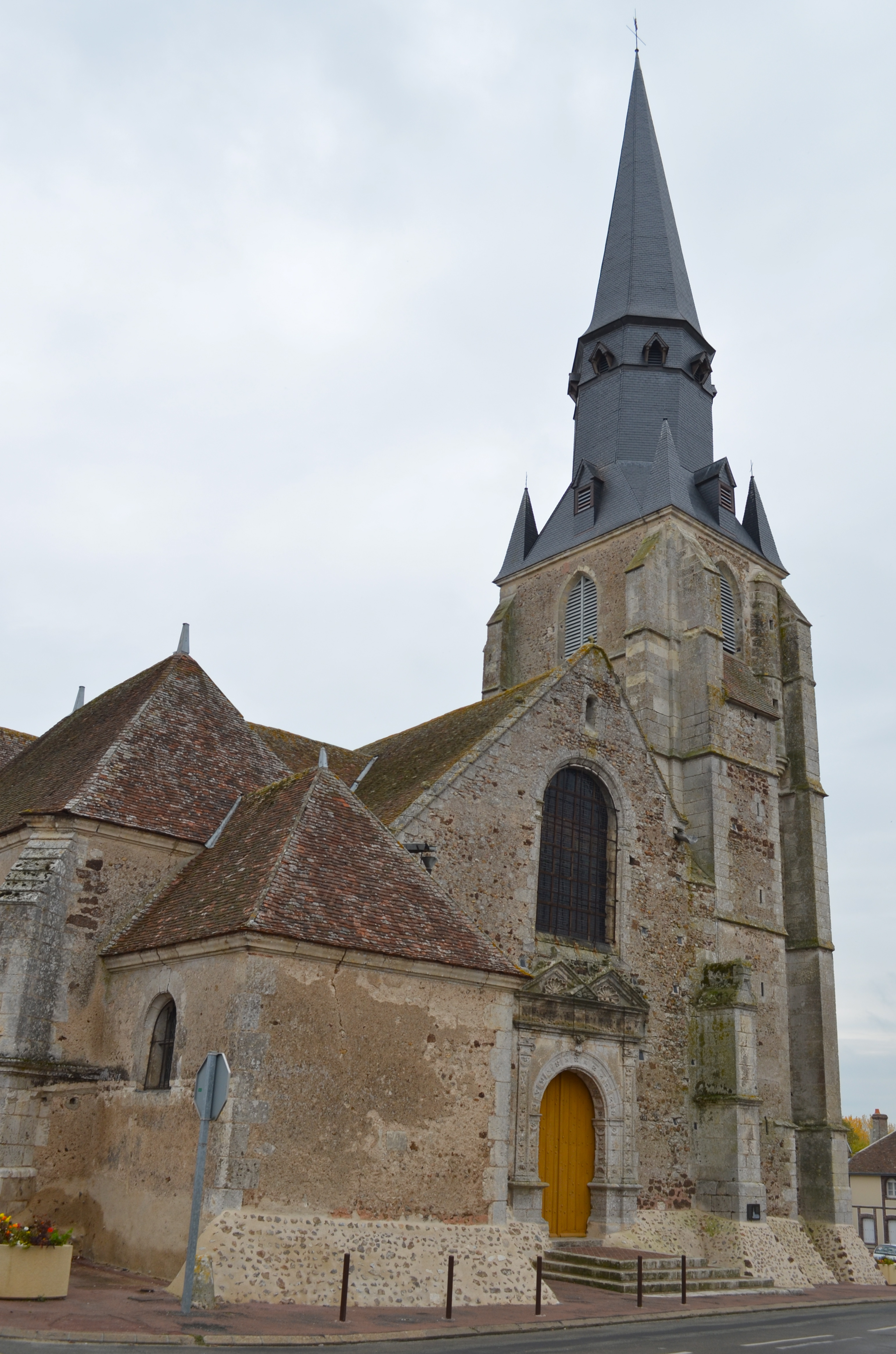
- The church in Yèvres

- Coat of arms
- Location of Yèvres
- Location within France Location within Centre-Val de Loire
- Coordinates: 48°12′40″N 1°11′28″E
- Country: France
- Region: Centre-Val de Loire
- Department: Eure-et-Loir
- Arrondissement: Châteaudun
- Canton: Brou
- Intercommunality: Grand Châteaudun

Government
  - Mayor (2023–2026): Danièle Carrouget
- Area^{1}: 41.75 km^{2} (16.12 sq mi)
- Highest elevation: 182 m (597 ft)
- Lowest elevation: 137 m (449 ft)
- Population (2023): 1,677
  - Density: 40.17/km^{2} (104.0/sq mi)
- Time zone: UTC+01:00 (CET)
  - Summer (DST): UTC+02:00 (CEST)
- INSEE/Postal code: 28424 /28160
- ^{1} French Land Register data, which excludes lakes, ponds, glaciers > 1 km^{2} (0.386 sq mi or 247 acres) and river estuaries.

Yèvres (French pronunciation: [jɛvʁ]) is a commune in the Eure-et-Loir department in northern France.

== Population ==
Historical population
Year	Pop.	±% p.a.
1968	1,211	—
1975	1,292	+0.93%
1982	1,458	+1.74%
1990	1,676	+1.76%
1999	1,707	+0.20%
2007	1,706	−0.01%
2012	1,714	+0.09%
2017	1,647	−0.79%
2023	1,677	+0.30%
Source: INSEE

== See also ==
- Communes of the Eure-et-Loir department
