= Unverre =

- Commune
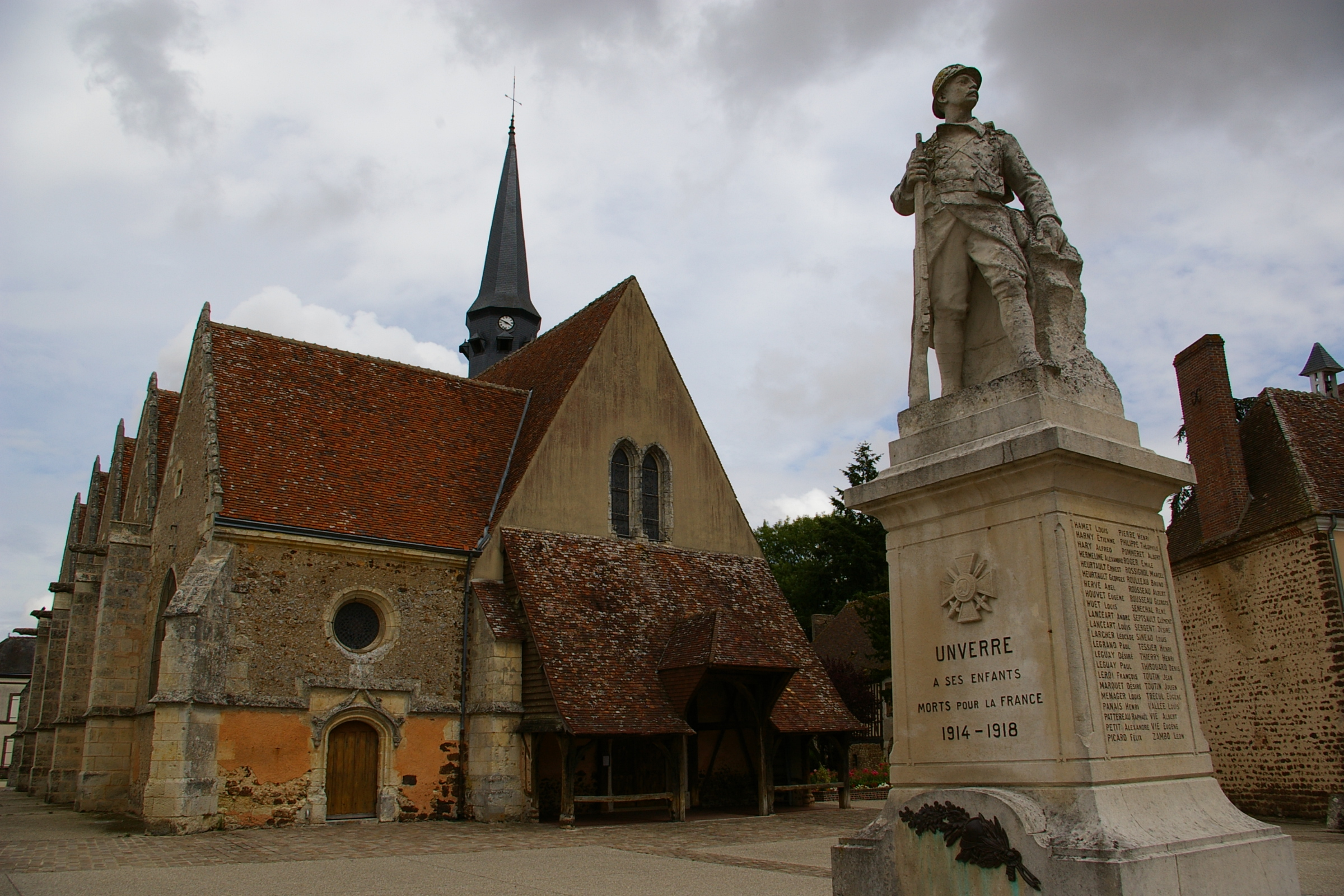
- The church in Unverre
- Location of Unverre
- Location within France Location within Centre-Val de Loire
- Coordinates: 48°12′01″N 1°05′39″E
- Country: France
- Region: Centre-Val de Loire
- Department: Eure-et-Loir
- Arrondissement: Châteaudun
- Canton: Brou
- Intercommunality: Grand Châteaudun

Government
  - Mayor (2020–2026): Marie-Dominique Pinos
- Area^{1}: 62.33 km^{2} (24.07 sq mi)
- Elevation: 160 m (520 ft)
- Highest elevation: 235 m (771 ft)
- Lowest elevation: 153 m (502 ft)
- Population (2023): 1,203
  - Density: 19.30/km^{2} (49.99/sq mi)
- Time zone: UTC+01:00 (CET)
  - Summer (DST): UTC+02:00 (CEST)
- INSEE/Postal code: 28398 /28160
- ^{1} French Land Register data, which excludes lakes, ponds, glaciers > 1 km^{2} (0.386 sq mi or 247 acres) and river estuaries.

Unverre (French pronunciation: [œ̃vɛʁ]) is a commune in the Eure-et-Loir department in northern France.

== Population ==
Historical population
Year	Pop.	±% p.a.
1968	1,294	—
1975	1,238	−0.63%
1982	1,109	−1.56%
1990	1,022	−1.02%
1999	977	−0.50%
2007	1,149	+2.05%
2012	1,254	+1.76%
2017	1,193	−0.99%
2023	1,203	+0.14%
Source: INSEE

== See also ==
- Communes of the Eure-et-Loir department
