= Béthonvilliers =

- Commune
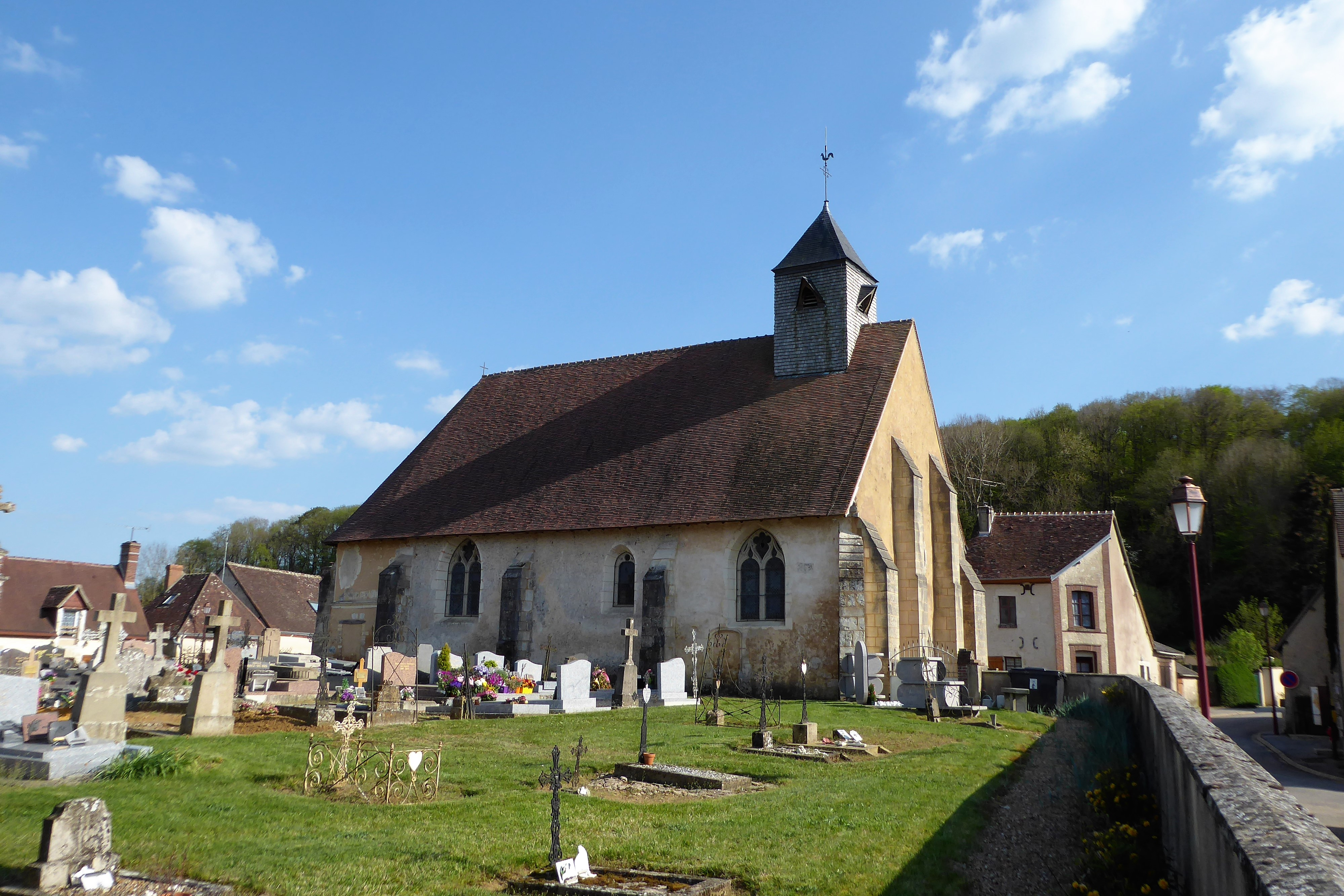
- The church in Béthonvilliers
- Location of Béthonvilliers
- Location within France Location within Centre-Val de Loire
- Coordinates: 48°13′19″N 0°54′37″E
- Country: France
- Region: Centre-Val de Loire
- Department: Eure-et-Loir
- Arrondissement: Nogent-le-Rotrou
- Canton: Brou
- Intercommunality: Perche

Government
  - Mayor (2020–2026): Claude Épinette
- Area^{1}: 12.33 km^{2} (4.76 sq mi)
- Elevation: 250 m (820 ft)
- Highest elevation: 261 m (856 ft)
- Lowest elevation: 156 m (512 ft)
- Population (2023): 132
  - Density: 10.7/km^{2} (27.7/sq mi)
- Time zone: UTC+01:00 (CET)
  - Summer (DST): UTC+02:00 (CEST)
- INSEE/Postal code: 28038 /28330
- ^{1} French Land Register data, which excludes lakes, ponds, glaciers > 1 km^{2} (0.386 sq mi or 247 acres) and river estuaries.

Béthonvilliers (French pronunciation: [betɔ̃vilje]) is a commune in the Eure-et-Loir department in northern France.

== Population ==
Historical population
Year	Pop.	±% p.a.
1968	180	—
1975	163	−1.41%
1982	147	−1.47%
1990	145	−0.17%
1999	133	−0.96%
2007	139	+0.55%
2012	147	+1.13%
2017	118	−4.30%
2023	132	+1.89%
Source: INSEE

== See also ==
- Communes of the Eure-et-Loir department
