= Mārtiņš Antons =

Latvian lawyer and politician

Mārtiņš Antons (7 January 1888, in Kocēni parish – 11 November 1941) was a Latvian lawyer and politician.

Antons graduated from St. Petersburg University in 1912, then worked as a lawyer in Riga. During the First World War he was a Baltic Refugees Committee member, and then on the Latvian Riflemen Organizing Committee.

In 1920, Antons was elected to both the Constitutional Assembly, and the Presidium as a Labor Party politician. However, he was later deported to Russia, and was killed in 1941 during World War II.
