= Les Autels-Villevillon =

- Commune
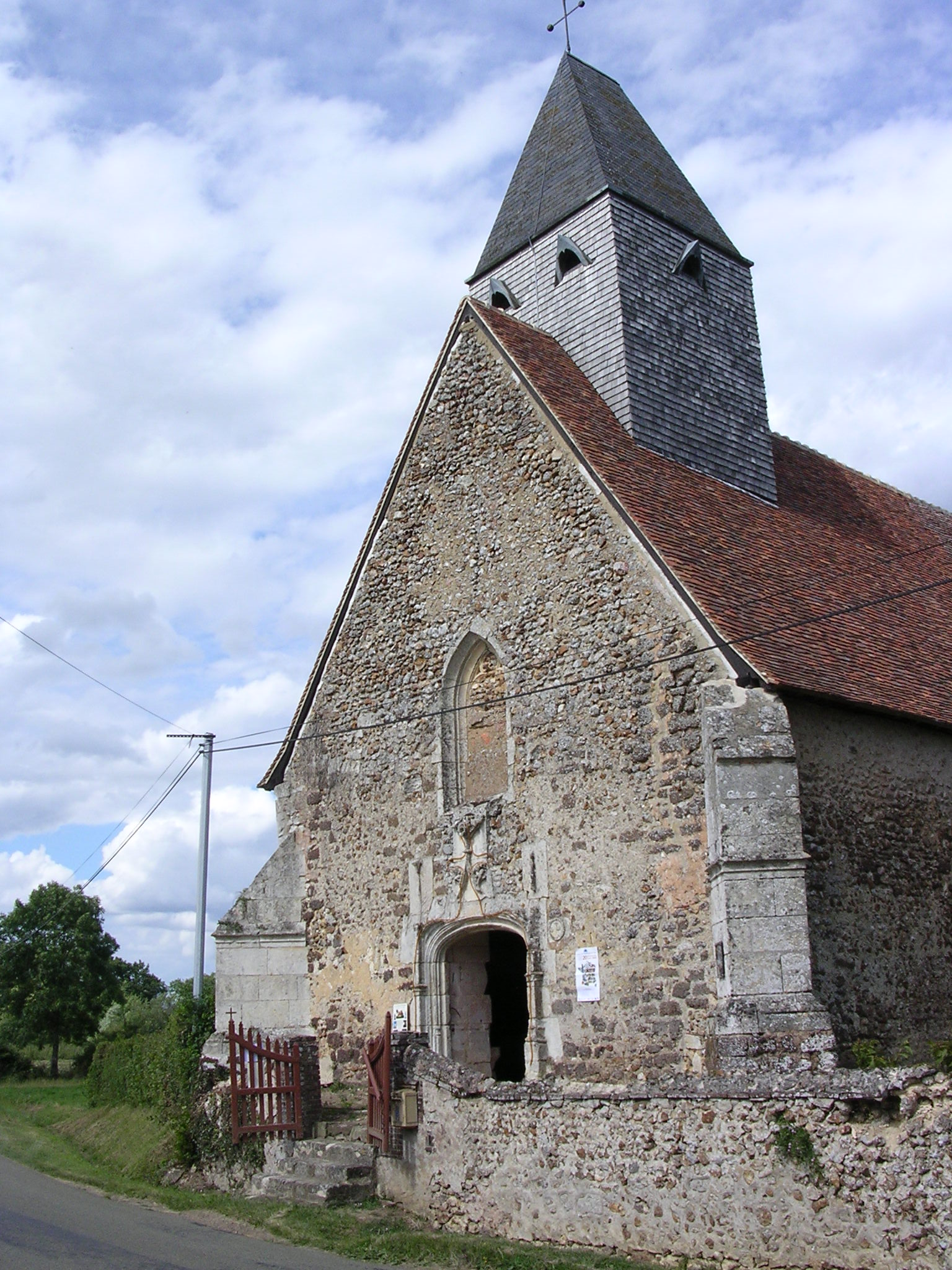
- The church in Villevillon

- Coat of arms
- Location of Les Autels-Villevillon
- Location within France Location within Centre-Val de Loire
- Coordinates: 48°10′27″N 0°59′56″E
- Country: France
- Region: Centre-Val de Loire
- Department: Eure-et-Loir
- Arrondissement: Nogent-le-Rotrou
- Canton: Brou

Government
  - Mayor (2021–2026): Nicole Delassau
- Area^{1}: 10.08 km^{2} (3.89 sq mi)
- Highest elevation: 217 m (712 ft)
- Lowest elevation: 174 m (571 ft)
- Population (2023): 106
  - Density: 10.5/km^{2} (27.2/sq mi)
- Time zone: UTC+01:00 (CET)
  - Summer (DST): UTC+02:00 (CEST)
- INSEE/Postal code: 28016 /28330
- ^{1} French Land Register data, which excludes lakes, ponds, glaciers > 1 km^{2} (0.386 sq mi or 247 acres) and river estuaries.

Les Autels-Villevillon (French pronunciation: [le.z‿otɛl vilvijɔ̃]) is a commune in the Eure-et-Loir department in northern France.

== Population ==
Historical population
Year	Pop.	±% p.a.
1968	281	—
1975	200	−4.74%
1982	140	−4.97%
1990	135	−0.45%
1999	120	−1.30%
2007	137	+1.67%
2012	170	+4.41%
2017	156	−1.70%
2023	106	−6.24%
Source: INSEE

== See also ==
- Communes of the Eure-et-Loir department
