= Miermaigne =

- Commune
- Coat of arms
- Location of Miermaigne
- Location within France Location within Centre-Val de Loire
- Coordinates: 48°14′50″N 0°59′38″E
- Country: France
- Region: Centre-Val de Loire
- Department: Eure-et-Loir
- Arrondissement: Nogent-le-Rotrou
- Canton: Brou
- Intercommunality: Perche

Government
  - Mayor (2020–2026): Marc Pétagna
- Area^{1}: 10.89 km^{2} (4.20 sq mi)
- Elevation: 250 m (820 ft)
- Highest elevation: 271 m (889 ft)
- Lowest elevation: 187 m (614 ft)
- Population (2023): 164
  - Density: 15.1/km^{2} (39.0/sq mi)
- Time zone: UTC+01:00 (CET)
  - Summer (DST): UTC+02:00 (CEST)
- INSEE/Postal code: 28252 /28480
- ^{1} French Land Register data, which excludes lakes, ponds, glaciers > 1 km^{2} (0.386 sq mi or 247 acres) and river estuaries.

Miermaigne (French pronunciation: [mjɛʁmɛɲ]) is a commune in the Eure-et-Loir department in northern France.

== Population ==
Historical population
Year	Pop.	±% p.a.
1968	224	—
1975	189	−2.40%
1982	175	−1.09%
1990	199	+1.62%
1999	202	+0.17%
2007	219	+1.02%
2012	226	+0.63%
2017	195	−2.91%
2023	164	−2.84%
Source: INSEE

== See also ==
- Communes of the Eure-et-Loir department
