= Authon-du-Perche =

- Commune
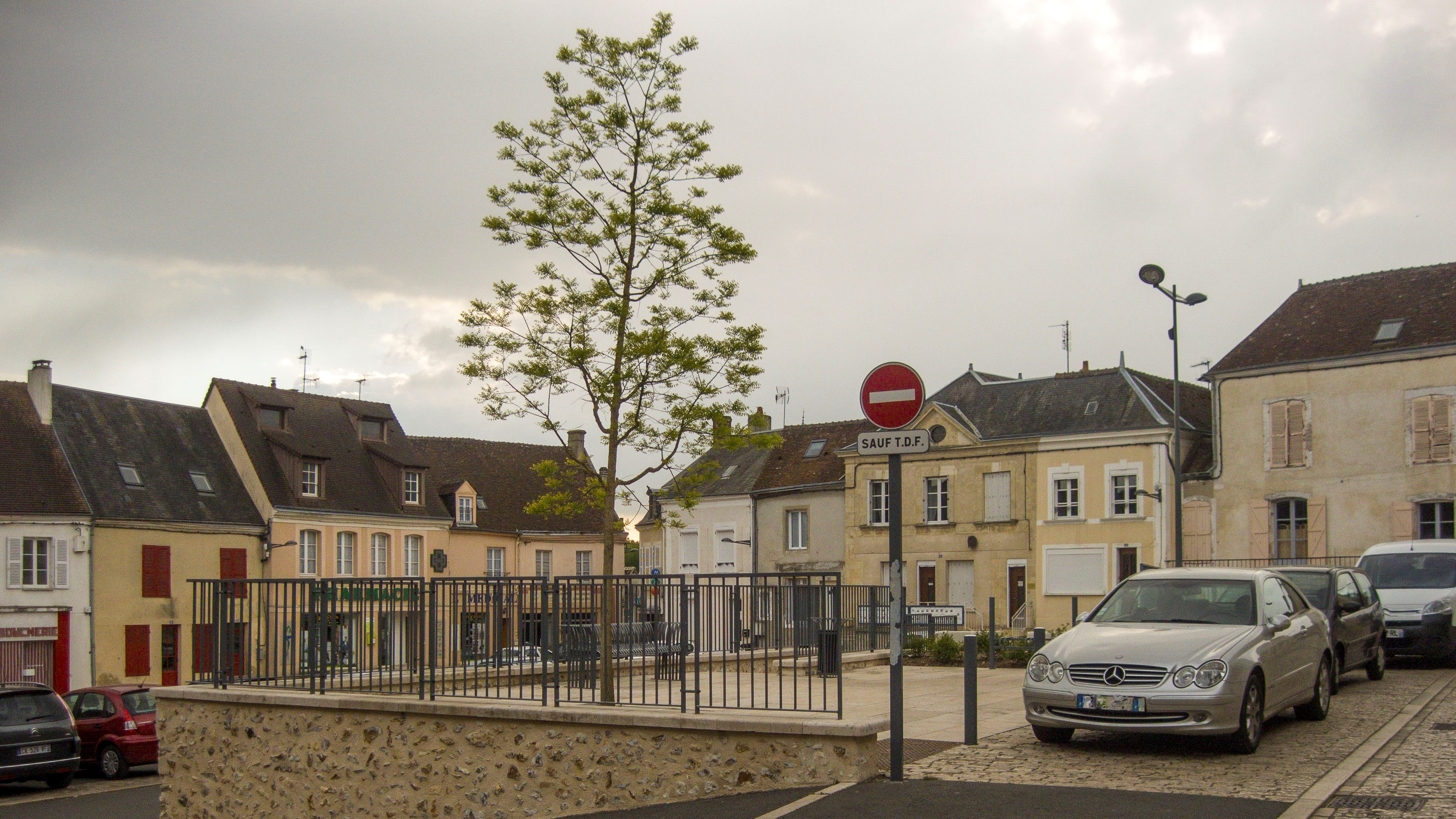
- The Place du Marché in Authon-du-Perche

- Coat of arms
- Location of Authon-du-Perche
- Location within France Location within Centre-Val de Loire
- Coordinates: 48°11′47″N 0°53′36″E
- Country: France
- Region: Centre-Val de Loire
- Department: Eure-et-Loir
- Arrondissement: Nogent-le-Rotrou
- Canton: Brou
- Intercommunality: CC Perche

Government
  - Mayor (2020–2026): Eric Girondeau
- Area^{1}: 34.82 km^{2} (13.44 sq mi)
- Highest elevation: 267 m (876 ft)
- Lowest elevation: 162 m (531 ft)
- Population (2023): 1,480
  - Density: 42.5/km^{2} (110/sq mi)
- Time zone: UTC+01:00 (CET)
  - Summer (DST): UTC+02:00 (CEST)
- INSEE/Postal code: 28018 /28330
- ^{1} French Land Register data, which excludes lakes, ponds, glaciers > 1 km^{2} (0.386 sq mi or 247 acres) and river estuaries.

Authon-du-Perche (French pronunciation: [otɔ̃ dy pɛʁʃ], literally Authon of the Perche) is a commune in the Eure-et-Loir department in northern France. On 1 January 2019, the former commune Soizé was merged into Authon-du-Perche. The source of the river Braye is near the commune.

== Population ==
Historical population
| Year | Pop. | ±% p.a. |
|---|---|---|
| 1968 | 1,597 | — |
| 1975 | 1,756 | +1.37% |
| 1982 | 1,612 | −1.21% |
| 1990 | 1,538 | −0.59% |
| 1999 | 1,536 | −0.01% |
| 2007 | 1,560 | +0.19% |
| 2012 | 1,603 | +0.55% |
| 2017 | 1,511 | −1.18% |
| 2023 | 1,480 | −0.34% |
Source: INSEE

Population data refer to the area corresponding with the commune as of January 2025.

== See also ==
- Communes of the Eure-et-Loir department
- Perche
