= Brou, Eure-et-Loir =

Brou
- Commune
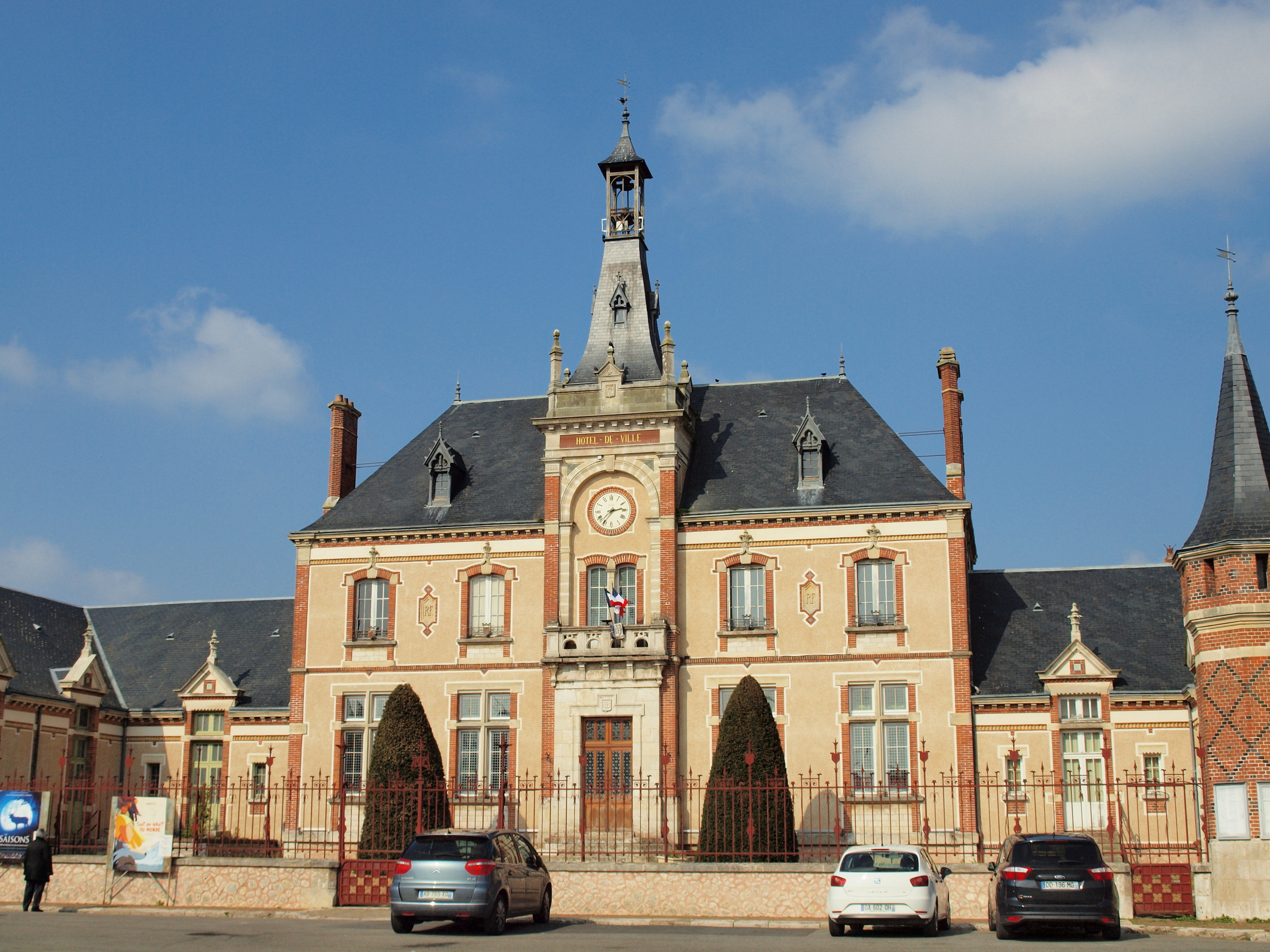
- The town hall in Brou

- Coat of arms
- Location of Brou
- Location within France Location within Centre-Val de Loire
- Coordinates: 48°12′39″N 1°10′05″E
- Country: France
- Region: Centre-Val de Loire
- Department: Eure-et-Loir
- Arrondissement: Châteaudun
- Canton: Brou

Government
  - Mayor (2020–2026): Philippe Masson
- Area^{1}: 19.83 km^{2} (7.66 sq mi)
- Highest elevation: 201 m (659 ft)
- Lowest elevation: 147 m (482 ft)
- Population (2023): 3,230
  - Density: 163/km^{2} (422/sq mi)
- Time zone: UTC+01:00 (CET)
  - Summer (DST): UTC+02:00 (CEST)
- INSEE/Postal code: 28061 /28160
- ^{1} French Land Register data, which excludes lakes, ponds, glaciers > 1 km^{2} (0.386 sq mi or 247 acres) and river estuaries.

Brou is a commune in the Eure-et-Loir department in northern France.

== Population ==
Historical population
Year	Pop.	±% p.a.
1968	3,501	—
1975	3,614	+0.45%
1982	3,825	+0.81%
1990	3,803	−0.07%
1999	3,713	−0.27%
2007	3,566	−0.50%
2012	3,489	−0.44%
2017	3,403	−0.50%
2023	3,230	−0.87%
Source: INSEE

== See also ==
- Communes of the Eure-et-Loir department
