= Canton of Brou =

Coordinates: 48.21°N 1.17°E

The canton of Brou is an administrative division of the Eure-et-Loir department, northern France. Its borders were modified at the French canton reorganisation which came into effect in March 2015. Its seat is in Brou.

It consists of the following communes:

1. Les Autels-Villevillon
2. Authon-du-Perche
3. La Bazoche-Gouet
4. Beaumont-les-Autels
5. Béthonvilliers
6. Brou
7. Chapelle-Guillaume
8. Chapelle-Royale
9. Charbonnières
10. Cloyes-les-Trois-Rivières
11. Coudray-au-Perche
12. Dampierre-sous-Brou
13. Les Étilleux
14. Frazé
15. Gohory
16. Luigny
17. Miermaigne
18. Montigny-le-Chartif
19. Mottereau
20. Moulhard
21. Saint-Bomer
22. Unverre
23. Vald'Yerre
24. Yèvres
