= Félix Charpentier =

French sculptor (1858–1924)

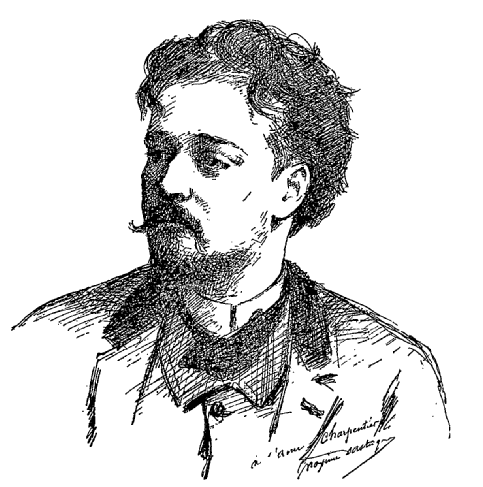
Félix Charpentier

Félix Charpentier (French pronunciation: [feliks ʃaʁpɑ̃tje]; 10 January 1858 in Bollène in Vaucluse – 1924) was a French sculptor. His work was part of the sculpture event in the art competition at the 1924 Summer Olympics.

== Biography ==
Félix Charpentier's father worked in a brick making factory and in 1871, Félix started work in the same factory. He was to show artistic talent when very young and at the age of 7 he was modelling small figures from wood and from the clay which he found at the brickworks where his father was working. At 16 years of age he went to Avignon and enrolled at the École des Beaux-Arts there and became a pupil of the sculptor Armand. In 1877, he entered the École nationale des beaux-arts de Paris and worked in the studio of Pierre-Jules Cavelier and Amédée Doublemard. From 1878 onwards, Felix' reputation grew and in 1867 he won the silver medal at the Exposition Universelle and received several commissions. He exhibited each year at the Salon des Artistes Français. In 1882 the Salon awarded him a citation for the composition entitled "Le Repos du Moissonneur" and in 1884 he was awarded the 3rd Prize medal for the composition entitled "Le Jeune Faune" which was then purchased by the city of Paris.

In 1887 his submission of the work in plaster entitled the "L'Improvisateur" won him the 2nd Prize medal and a paid visit to Italy and in 1889 with a bronze version of the same piece he won a silver medal at the Paris World Fair. In 1890 he won the Salon's 1st Prize medal and the Exhibition Prize for the compositions of "La Chanson" in marble and "Lutteurs" in plaster. The marble version of "Les Lutteurs" was to subsequently bring him the Salon's highest award, the "Medal of Honour". It was purchased by the State and since 1905 has stood by the town hall of Bollène. On 5 May 1892, the day of the unveiling of the monument celebrating Avignon's absorption into France, he was decorated with the title of Chevalier of the Légion d'honneur. In 1888 he had married his model, Léa Lucas and they had a daughter called Francine. In 1900 he was elected mayor of Chassant in Eure-et-Loir where he lived. During his life he received commissions for a number of public monuments and after the Great War he was chosen as the sculptor of various war memorials (monuments aux morts).

== Principal works ==
Name	Location	Date	Notes
"Première sensation"	Avignon	1882	This work is held in the Musée Calvet d'Avignon.
"The monument celebrating the centenary of Avignon's absorption into the French Empire-The "Monument du Centenaire"	Avignon	1891	Below is an old post card showing the monument. Charpentier carried out the substantial sculptural work involved. Avignon's Monument du Centenaire
"Vénus aux hirondelles"	Avignon	1893	This was one of Charpentier's earliest works and it stands in the "Jardin du rocher des Doms". The work in bronze was presented to the Paris Salon in 1894. A hirondelle is the bird the swallow.
"Le Globe Endormi"			Charpentier was awarded the Gold Medal at the Exposition trienniele Internationale in Vienna for this composition.
L'Art contemporain"	Paris	1900	This work is on the façade of the eastern side of the Grand Palais in the Avenue Winston-Churchill in Paris.
"La Tâche"			This work in plaster was submitted to the Paris Salon in 1908. A "Tâche" is a task.
Statue of Antoine Bigot	Nîmes	1903	Charpentier was the sculptor of the statue of Antoine Bigot, the writer, which stands in Nîmes' Jardin de la Fontaine. Bigot was born in Nîmes (1825–1897) and was a member of the Académie de Nîmes.
Gare de Lyon	Paris		Charpentier competed sculptural decoration for this Paris railway station. Allegory of Steam (1899), Gare de Lyon, Paris Allegory of Navigation (1899), Gare de Lyon, Paris Allegory of the Mediterranean (1902), Gare de Lyon, Paris
Madier de Montjau	Bourg-Saint-Andéol	1899	The inscription on the pedestal reads "À MADIER DE MONTJAU / LA DEMOCRATIE / RECONNAISSANTE / 1814–1892" It seems that between 1942 and 1944 the bronze was replaced by a version in stone.
Monument to Émile Jamais	Aigues-Vives		This monument is in the place Émile-Jamais.The original statue was taken by the Germans in 1942 and the bronze melted down for the manufacture of armaments. Charpentier's work was recreated by the sculptor Philippe Jamet Pournier and the replacement was inaugurated on 13 November 1993.
Bust of Frédéric Mistral		1911	Le Jardin des Félibres honours the Félibrige a movement founded in 1854 by Frédéric Mistral and six other poets from Provence to protect and promote the language of the Oc and at the garden's centre is the grave of Jean-Pierre Claris de Florian, considered as the precursor of this movement. There is a fountain in the garden and the busts of 10 poets surround it. These are Jean-Charles Brun, Sextius Michel, Joseph Loubet, Pierre Deluns Montaud, Clovis Hugues, Paul Mariéton, Téodor Aubanel, Frédéric Mistral, Paul Arène and Maurice Faure. The garden is located in the Avenue du Président Franklin D.Roosevelt by the church of Saint-Jean-Baptiste. Charpentier sculpted the bust of Mistral.
"La Source Humaine"		1908	Charpentier was commissioned to create a sculptural composition for a very large fountain called "La Source Humaine" to be installed in the Jardin du Luxembourg/Luxembourg Garden in Paris and this work was to occupy Charpentier on and off until his death. The work was to be in Carrara marble and the dimensions were so huge that Charpentier had to move to bigger premises to fulfill the commission. The piece was finally installed in the Parc Pasteur in Orléans, Loiret, on loan from the Musée d'Orsay.
Monument to Antoine Auguste Blachère	Nimes	1902	This monument, comprising a pedestal with bas-relief surmounted by a bust of Blachère, is located in the Saint Baudile cemetery in Nimes in the Gard and involves sculptural work by Charpentier and Léopold Mérignargues. Carpentier sculpted the bust of Blachère which is in bronze and Mérignargues was responsible for the bas-relief on the side of the pedestal, also in bronze. Blachère served in the cavalry as a captain and had seen action in the Sahara and Sudan.
Monument to Alphonse Benoit	Isle-sur-la-Sorgue		At the top of the pedestal is a bronze of this industrialist and philanthropist and at the sides are elaborate sculptures by Charpentier.
Bust entitled "Mireille"	Nogent-sur-Seine	1894	This work is located in the Musée Paul Dubois-Alfred Boucher. Mireille was a heroine in the writings of Frédéric Mistral. It was in 1894 that Charpentier executed the piece in Terra cotta and a version in marble was it seems available in 1909 when it was offered for sale.
Bust of Sain	Avignon		Paul Saïn was a painter born in Avignon in 1853. He died in 1908. Charpentier created a bronze medallion with Sain's portrait for his tomb in Saint-Véran cemetery in Avignon. Charpentier also sculpted a bust of Sain which is in Avignon's Jardin des Doms.
The monument to the Girondins	Bordeaux		The monument honouring the Girondins stands in the massive Place des Quinconces in Bordeaux, one of the largest squares in Europe. See note regarding this monument. (Note: It is here that the two Chateaux Trompette had stood. The first castle was constructed after the Battle of Castillon fought in 1453 which had marked the end of three centuries of English domination and the second was constructed during the minority of Louis XIV after a series of civil wars in France between 1648 and 1653 known as the Fronde. This second castle was demolished in 1816 and the current square constructed. The Place des Quinconces derived its name from the original geometric formation of the trees planted there. The monument itself is of huge dimensions and at its centre is a tall Corinthian column on top of which a bronze statue of Liberty holds a broken chain in one hand and a laurel branch in the other. The chain symbolizes oppression, now overcome, and the laurel, which the figure is offering to the people of Bordeaux, symbolizes victory. Around the base of the column are several sculptural groupings. In one grouping three female figures represent Bordeaux and the rivers Garonne and the Dordogne region and in another a gallic rooster is joined by figures representing rhetoric and history. The Monument aux Girondin was built between 1894 and 1902 in honour of the Girondin deputies, victims of the reign of terror of the French Revolution, and in honour of the Third Republic. The idea of the monument came from the Bordeaux sculptor Achille Dumilatre and when work started he enlisted help from fellow sculptors Felix Charpentier and Gustave Debrie. It was Debrie who created the horses involved in one of the sculptural groupings. One of these groupings, that at the base of the column facing the river Garonne, features a French Cockerel representing the French Republic, and she is joined by female figures representing "Rhetoric" and "History". The planned groups of statues of the Girondins, who played such an important role in laying down the foundations of French liberty are in fact absent from the monument dedicated to their courage and empty pedestals on the north and south facing sides above the two fountains are where these statues would have been placed. Dumilatre had planned there to be statues of the Girondins Vergniaud, Buzot, Barbaroux, Brissot de Warville and Pétion occupying the side of the monument facing the Grand Theatre, whereas Guadet, Gensonné, Grangeneuve and Boyer-Fonfrède were to be represented on the opposite side facing towards the Chartrons district. However Dumilatre never finished the statues and the early models were badly damaged when the sculptor's workshop collapsed during a storm. On the west side of the plinth facing the arc of the road, three stone statues of women represent Bordeaux in the centre and the rivers Garonne and Dordogne (which converge downstream to form the Gironde estuary) are represented by two laughing water nymphs. The theme of the basin facing towards the Grand Theatre is that of "the Triumph of the Republic" with bronze statues representing work (a blacksmith), security and power (the lion). To the left and right of the representation of the Republic who is seated on her throne, is a group of three children symbolising the fundamental laws of obligatory education (on her left) and military service (on her right) voted at the time of the first republic. The two seahorses and two reptile-horses are preceded by three figures symbolising the Republic's triumph over ignorance, vice and lies. The grouping in the basin facing the Chartrons represents "the Triumph of Concord" who, carrying an olive branch of peace, protects Fraternity (a worker and a towns person) and Abundance from which is born prosperity. Industry and Trade are symbolized by the three children to her right, and Art and Science are represented by the three children on her left. During the Second World War many of the bronze statues in Bordeaux were melted down to assist the German war effort and in 1943 the bronzes of the Girondins monument were dismantled ready for smelting. Happily the thirty-four bronzes escaped the foundry and were found in October 1944 in Angers and returned to Bordeaux in July 1945, but only in 1983 were the horses returned to the fountain's basins. In 2005/6 the monument underwent a major face-lift.)
Camille Gaté (in French)	Nogent-le-Rotrou		This bust is located in the Nogent-le-Rotrou museum, department of Eure-et-Loir. Gaté was an accomplished artist and sculptor, famous in particular for his bronze dogs. He was born in Nogent-le-Rotrou on 14 April 1856 and died there in August 1900.
Bello Matinado	Châteaudun	Approx.1909.	There is a plaster model of this work in the Musée municipal de Châteaudun, department of Eure-et-Loir, and a marble version is in the Muséew des Beaux-arts, Rio de Janeiro, Brazil. Versions of the work can be found elsewhere in France.
"Les Lutteurs"	Bollène	1893	A lutteur is a wrestler and Greco-Roman wrestling was very popular in 19th century Provence. Charpentier worked on this composition in 1893 in memory of his father. The work received the "Médaille d'Or" at the Paris Exhibition of 1900. It was shown at the Louvre then given by the State to the town of Bollène on 14 February 1905. It was inaugurated on 17 December of that year by Président Emile Loubet and stands in front of the mairie.
Monument to the painter Paul Vayson	Avignon	1913	On 18 September 1913, a monument was erected in Vayson's honour. It stands in the "Rocher des Dames" park in Avignon. In this composition Charpentier shows Vayson with some sheep.
"La Chanson"		1889	There are copies of this work in the town halls of Melle and Bollène.
Statue of Jean-Baptiste Godin	Guise		The original statue honoring Jean-Baptiste Godin had been inaugurated in 1889 and involved work by sculptors Tony Noël and Amédée Doublemard. However, during the 1914–1918 war the German Army demolished the statue to melt down its bronze content to manufacture armaments. Felix Charpentier sculpted the replacement statue of Godin and it was inaugurated on 17 September 1922.
"L'improvisateur"			A standing figure of a nude youth, sometimes identified as the god Pan, playing a flute carved from a twig. The original is fully nude; commercial copies often add a loincloth concealing the genitalia. A life-size nude copy in bronze was installed in the square outside the town hall of Bandol on 21 April 1953. Over subsequent decades it suffered discoloration from corrosion, oxidation and public handling. This, combined with concerns over metal theft, led to the decision that it should be removed for restoration and conservation. On 8 October 2020 it was removed from display and sent to the Réunion des Musées Nationaux workshops near Paris, where it was subjected to thorough cleaning and refurbishment and repatinated. A mould was taken so that a replica could be made to replace the original on its outdoor pedestal. The refurbished statue was installed indoors in the Médiathèque de Bandol on 4 February 2021. Production of the replica was delayed owing to the COVID-19 pandemic, but it was finally scheduled to be placed on display on 29 June 2021. There are other versions in various locations, these in different sizes and with or without the flute. Another copy is in the mairie of Bollène. Charpentier is thought to have executed this work in 1887 and a version in plaster was exhibited at the Salon in Paris in 1887 and won the "Medaille de Seconde Classe". In 1890 it was placed in the Musée des Beaux-Arts in Havre but was most certainly subsequently destroyed in 1945. The bronze version cast by the foundry "Siot and Perzinka" was created in 1888. It was exhibited at the Paris International Exhibition in 1889. See photograph in gallery below.
"Femme Accroupi"	Vanves	1930	This work in limestone is located in the parc Frédéric Pic in Vanves in Hauts-de-Seine. It is one of a group of four sculptures. Charpentier's work depicts a woman in a crouching position ("accroupi").
"Jeanne d'Arc à l'étendard"		1888	This statue stands in the porch of the Basilique Sainte Jeanne d'Arc in the Rue de la Chapelle. See image in gallery below. Joan, in patriotic mode, carries the flag of France.
"L'illusion"	Barbezieux-Saint-Hilaire		The work entitled "L'illusion" is thought to date to 1895. It is in marble and is located in the mairie.
"Vieux Berger"	Le Puy-en-Velay	1900	The composition "Vieux Berger" is a bronze thought to have been executed around 1900. It is held in the Musée Crozatier.
"Volupté"	Decize	1901	The work is sculpted from marble and is located in the mairie.
"Le dernier chant d'une cigale"		1904	This work in marble was submitted to the 1904 exhibition of the Société des Artistes français. See photograph in gallery below. A cigale is a cicada or cricket which is an insect which is abundant in Provence. Copies of this work can be seen in Buenos Aires and Châlons-en-Champagne
"Femme à l'éponge"	Maubeuge	1910	This work depicts a woman washing herself.
Jean Henri Fabre (1823–1915)	Paris		This is a bronze depicting Jean Henri Fabre, the famous French entomologist. It was cast by the foundry SIDI and is held in the Musée d'Orsay. Thought to have been executed between 1914 and 1919. It was shown at the Paris Salon in 1914 and held in the École Normale d'Avignon. A statuette was placed in the Musée du Luxembourg in 1922.
"Le Jeune Faune"	Paris		This piece is thought to have been executed between 1914 and 1919. The marble version is located in the parc Monceau in Paris.
"Head of woman in profile"	Le Mans	1924	This work is a terracotta bas-relief depicting the profile of a woman's head. It is held in the Musée de Tessé in Le Mans.
Fernand Widal	Paris		Charpentier's bust of Fernand Widal is located in the Montparnasse cemetery in Paris.

== War memorials ==
After the end of the 1914–1918 war there was a huge demand for sculptors to work on war memorials (monument aux morts) There was a tendency for commissions for war memorial sculpture to be given to sculptors who had been born in the location involved or at least lived there. For this reason Charpentier was the preferred sculptor for the war memorials of Bollène, Roquemaure, Sainte-Cécile-les-Vignes and Saint-Paul-Trois-Châteaux, all in the region of his birth, whilst his adopted region commissioned him to carry out the sculptural work on the war memorials of Béville-le-Comte, Bonneval, Brou, Chassant, Combres, Dangeau, Frétigny, Fruncé and Unverre. He was also asked to work on the war memorials of Misy-sur-Yonne and Genas. He also worked on a number of busts of prominent people and various medallions. Notes on some of the war memorials involving work by Charpentier are shown below,

Name	Location	Date	Notes
War Memorial at Bollène	Vaucluse	1920	Although Charpentier's sculpture was completed in 1920, the memorial was not inaugurated until 1930, the delay being caused by a legal dispute concerning the siting of the memorial. 221 men of Bollène lost their lives in the two world wars. In Charpentier's limestone sculpture an angel holds a crown of laurel over the head of a soldier.
War Memorial at Roquemaure	Gard		Charpentier again used the composition which stands on the top of the monument in Avignon celebrating Avignon's joining of the French Empire.
War Memorial at Bonneval	Eure-et-Loir		Charpentier was responsible for the sculpture on the Bonneval War Memorial.
War Memorial at Brou	Eure-et-Loir		Charpentier sculpted the figure of the soldier on this war memorial. 137 men of Brou were killed in the 1914–1918 war: 10% of the male population.
War Memorial at Chassant	Eure-et-Loir	1921	The marble version of this work was exhibited at the Paris Salon in 1905. Charpentier gave the plaster model to the church as a gift in 1921 following Joan's canonization in that year. Charpentier also gave the Chassant mairie a plaster version of his "Marianne". The bust executed in 1892 is the model used for the "Marianne" which sits at the top of Avignon's monument celebrating the reunion of Comtat Venaissin with France.
War Memorial at Sainte-Cécile-les-Vignes	Vaucluse	1920	Sainte-Cécile-les-Vignes is quite near to Bollène and Charpentier's statue of a standing soldier dates to 1920. This model was also used for the war memorial in Genas in the Rhône, both being carved from limestone. There is a small bas-relief on the side of the pedestal carved by a little known sculptor called Mourbié.
War Memorial at Combres	Eure et Loir	1923	Composition in limestone depicts a woman representing France and holding the National flag. Charpentier also used this figure for the war memorial at Saint-Paul-Trois-Châteaux in Drôme.
War Memorial at Béville-le-Comte	Eure et Loir	1923	Charpentier carves the figure of a soldier from limestone.
War Memorial at Fruncé	Eure et Loir	1923	Charpentier carves another soldier from limestone. The memorial's inauguration took place on 13 May 1923.
War Memorial at Unverre	Eure et Loir		

=== War memorials gallery ===
War memorials by Félix Charpentier

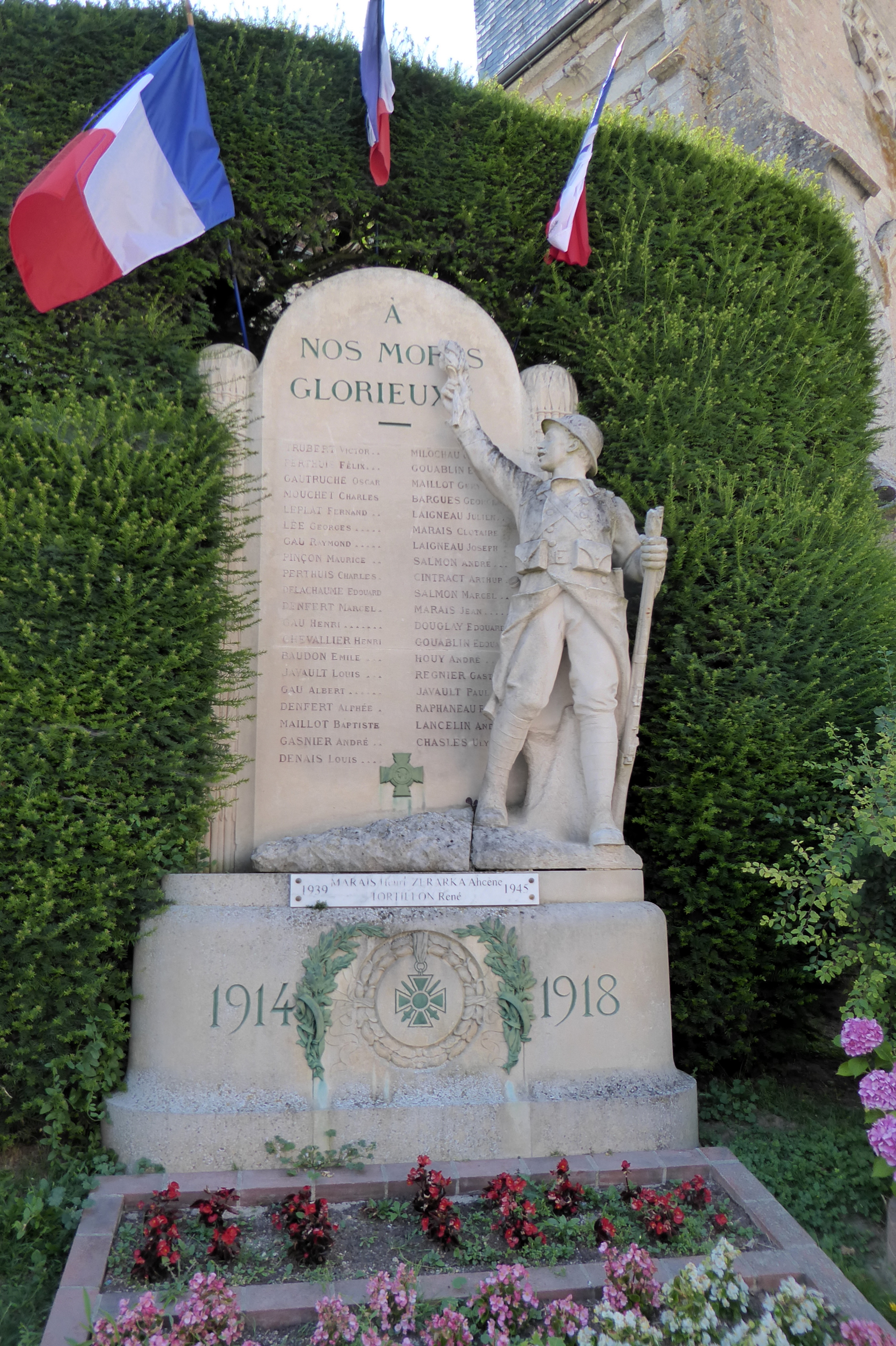
Béville-le-Comte
Eure-et-Loir.

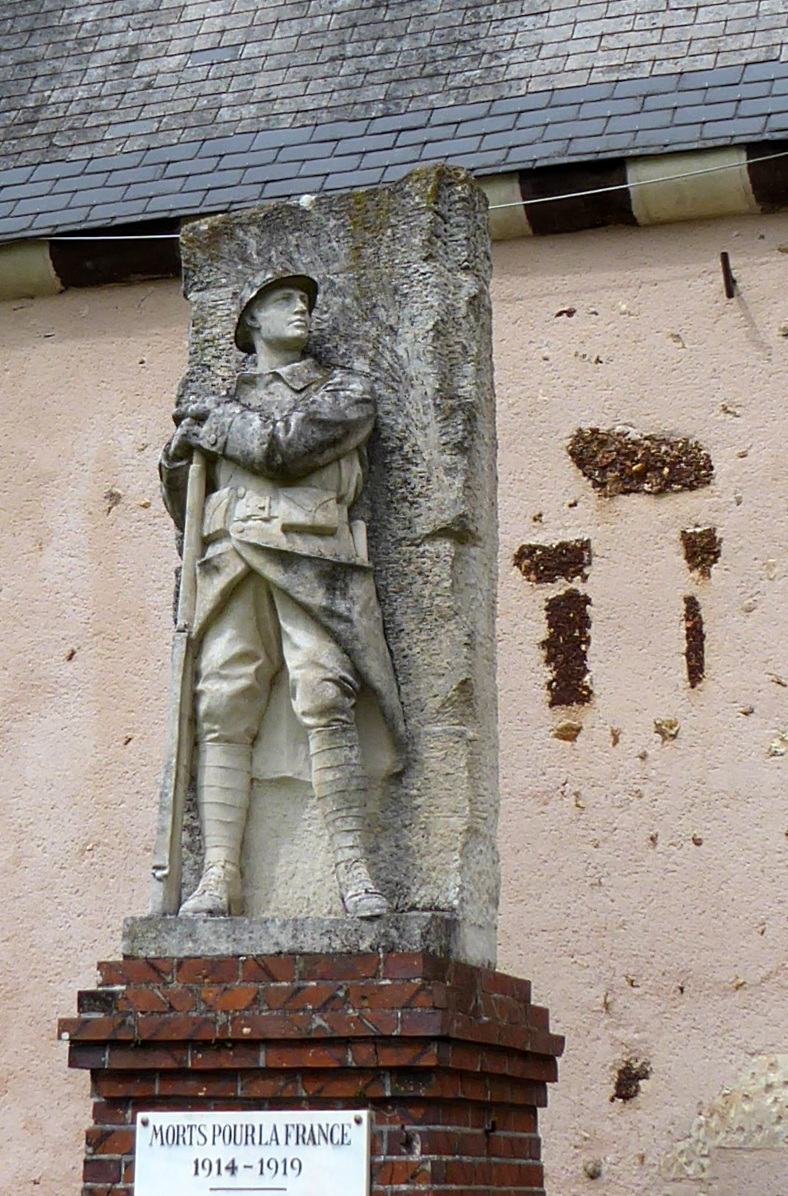
Chassant
Eure-et-Loir.

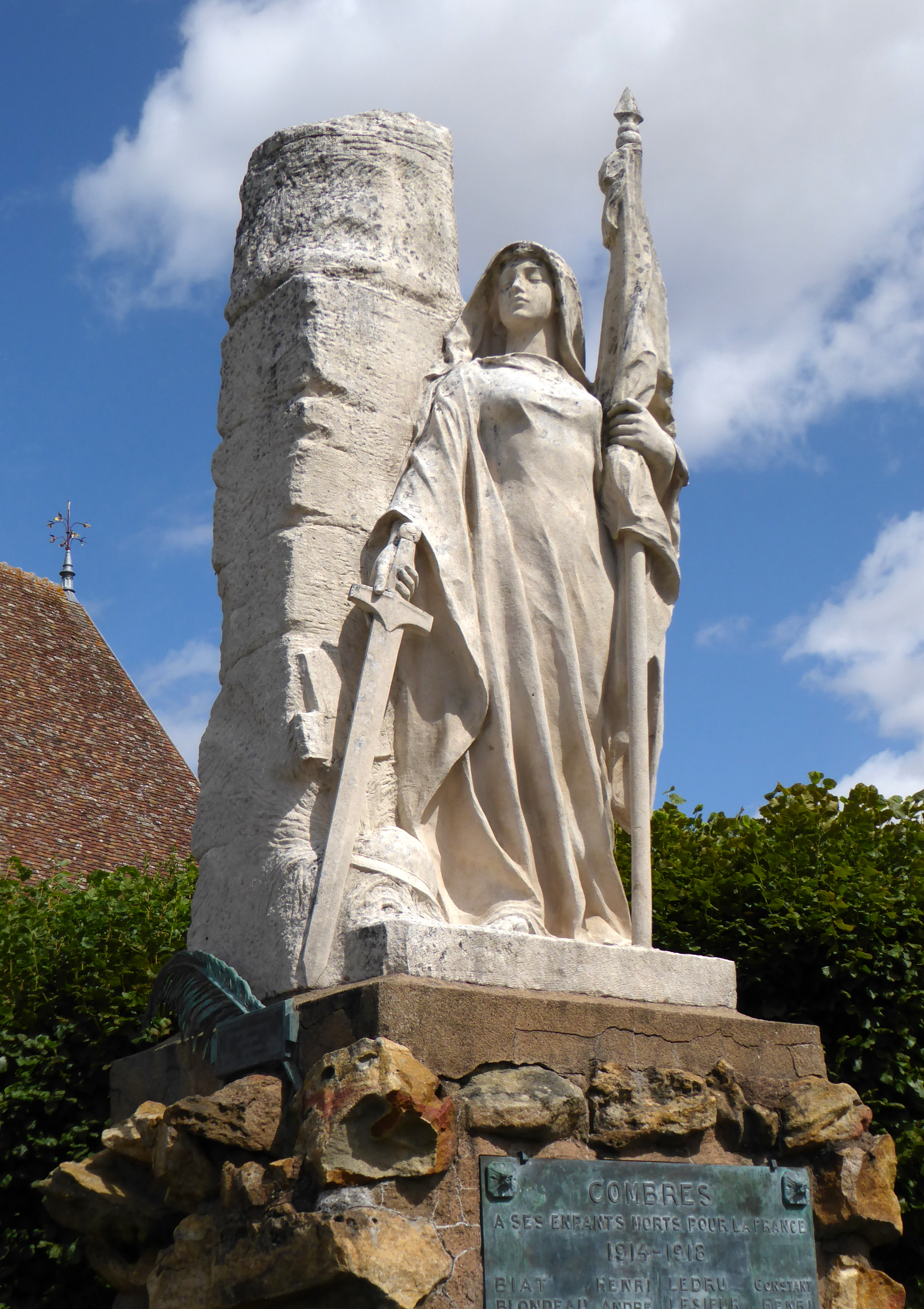
Combres
Eure-et-Loir.

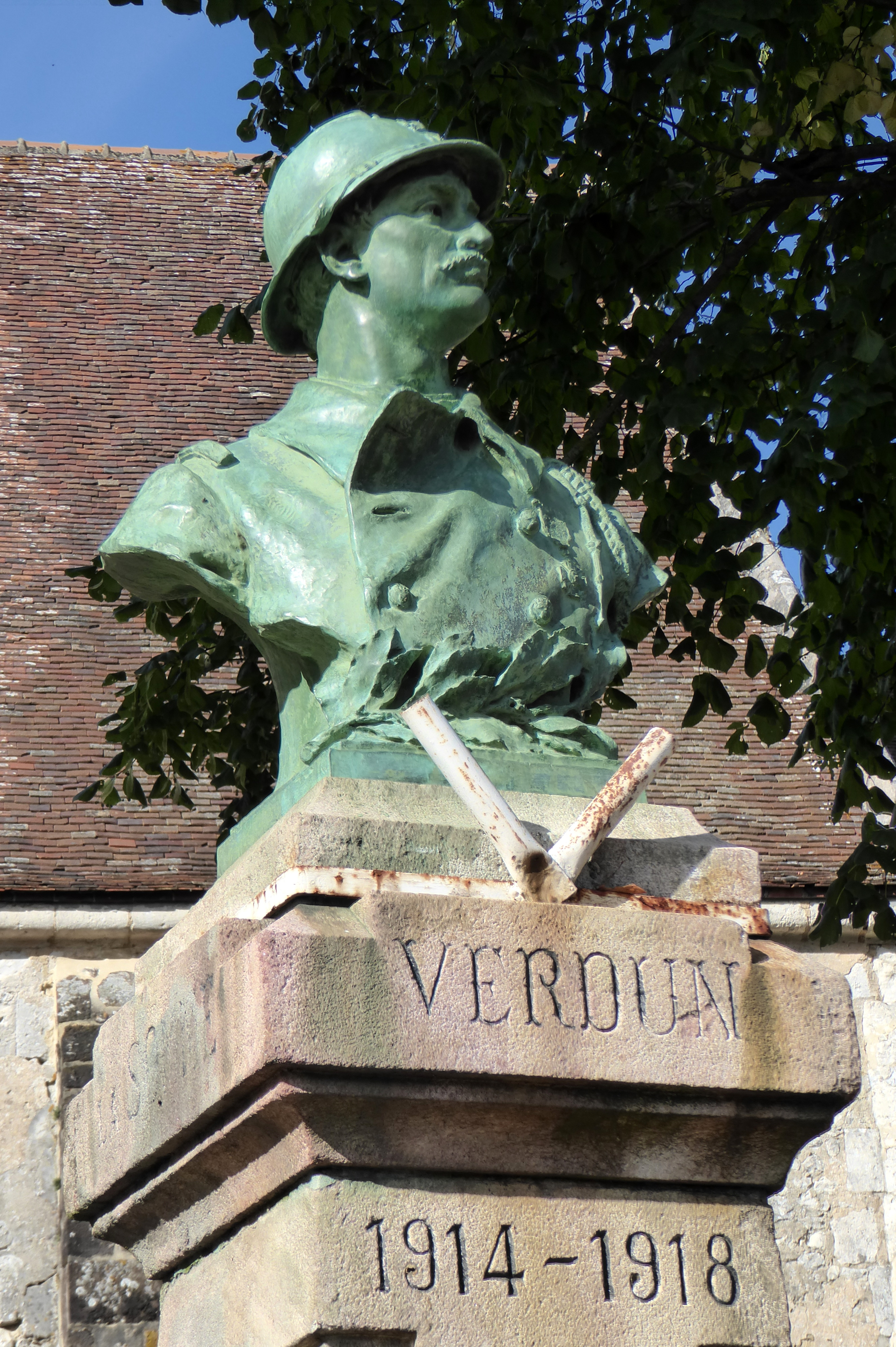
Frétigny
Eure-et-Loir.

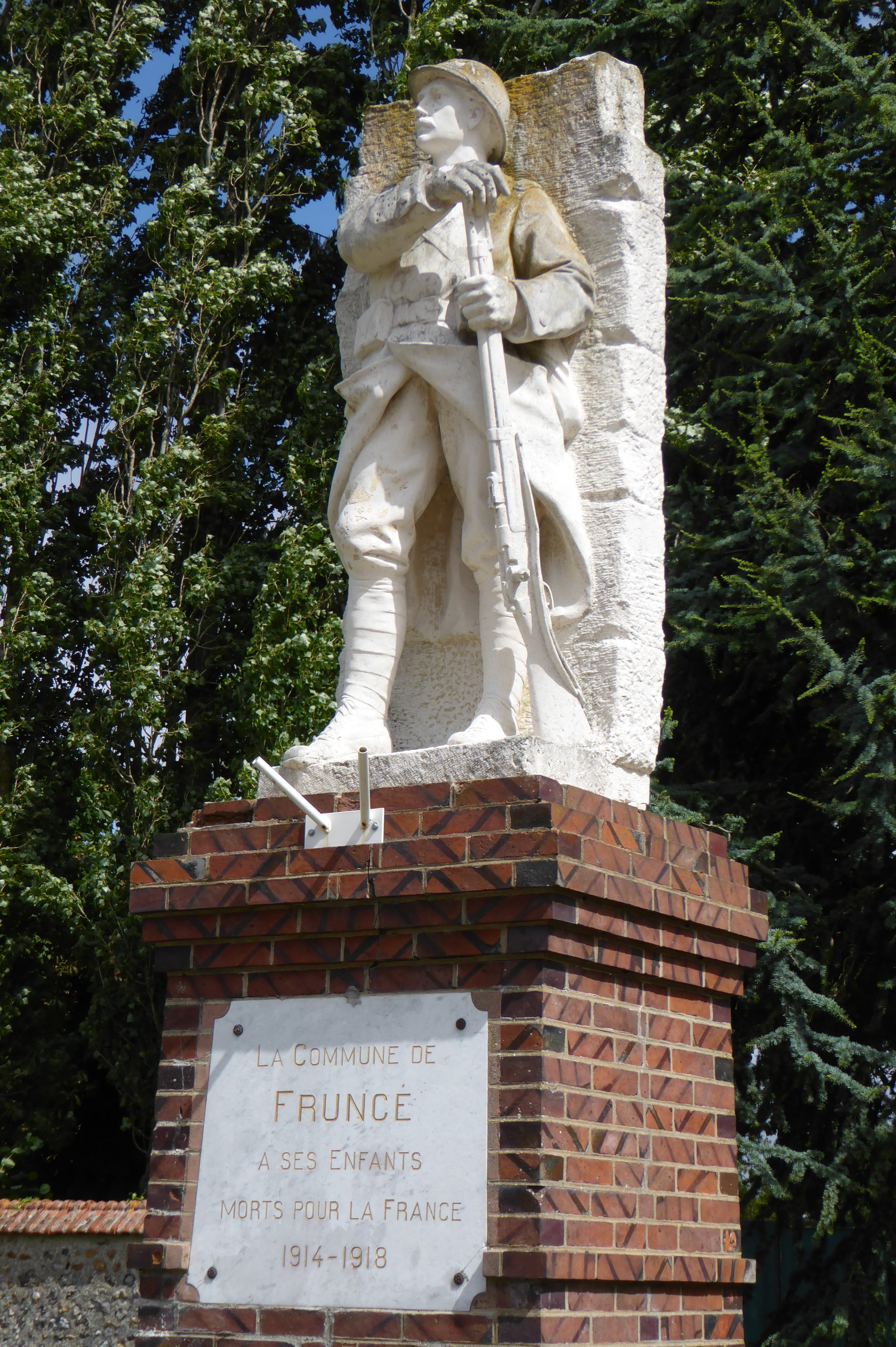
Fruncé
Eure-et-Loir.

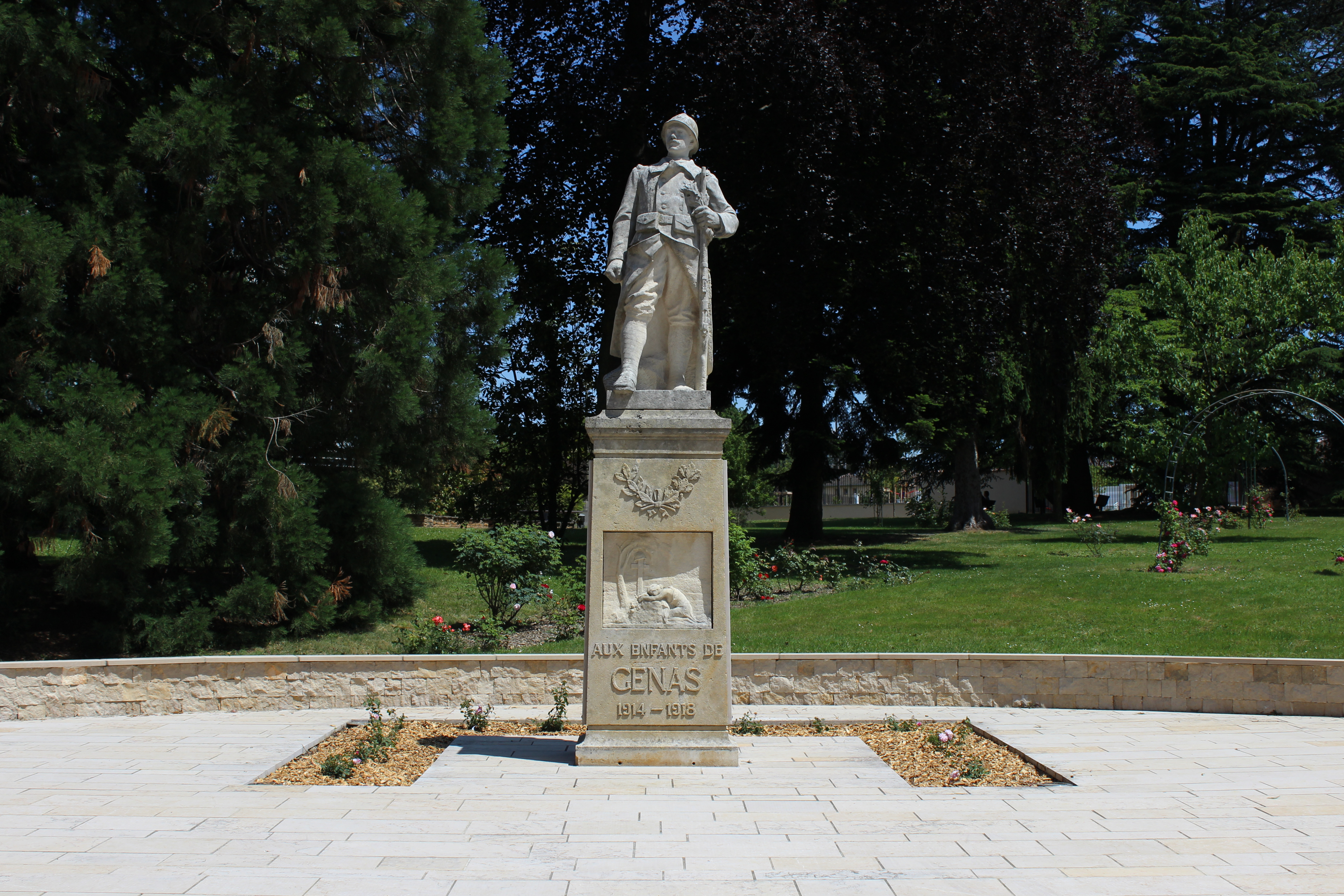
Genas
Rhône.

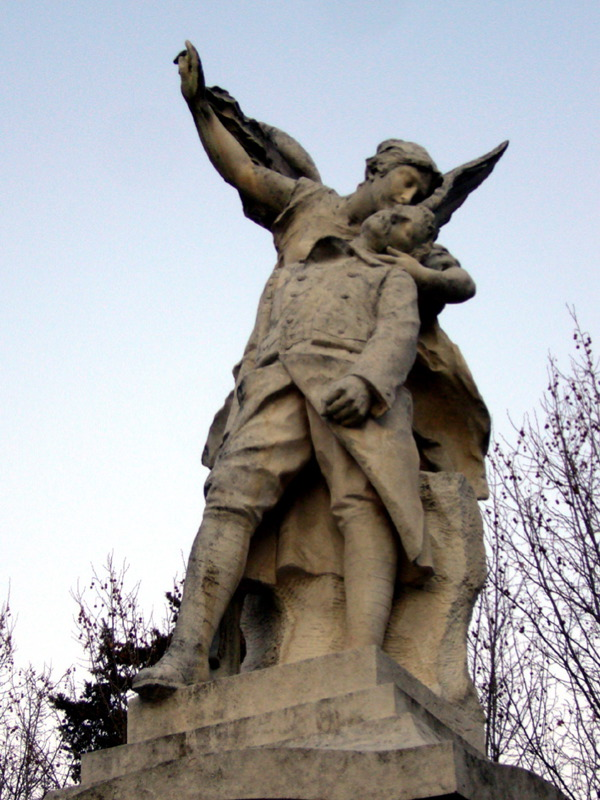
Roquemaure
Gard.

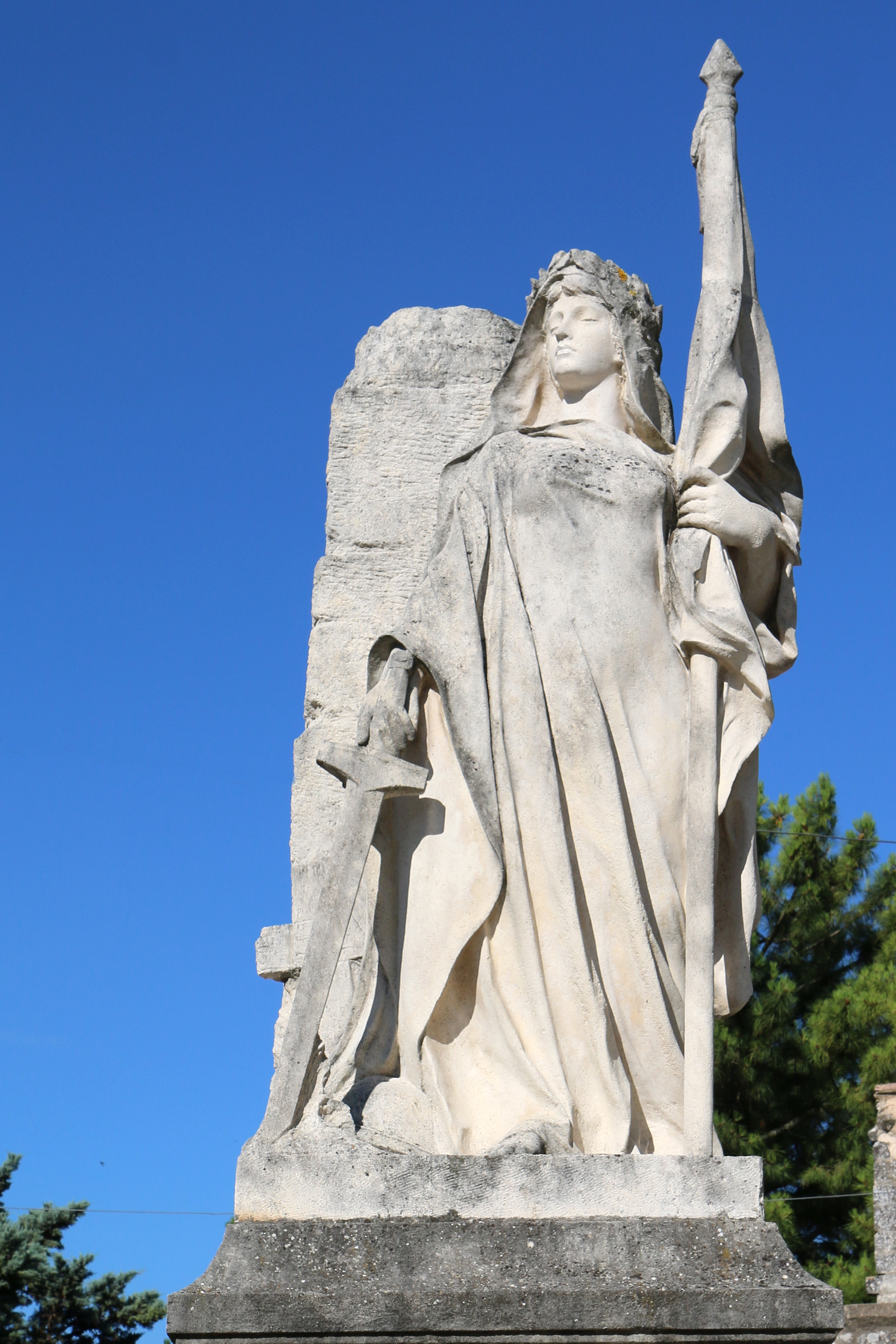
Saint-Paul-Trois-Châteaux
Drôme.

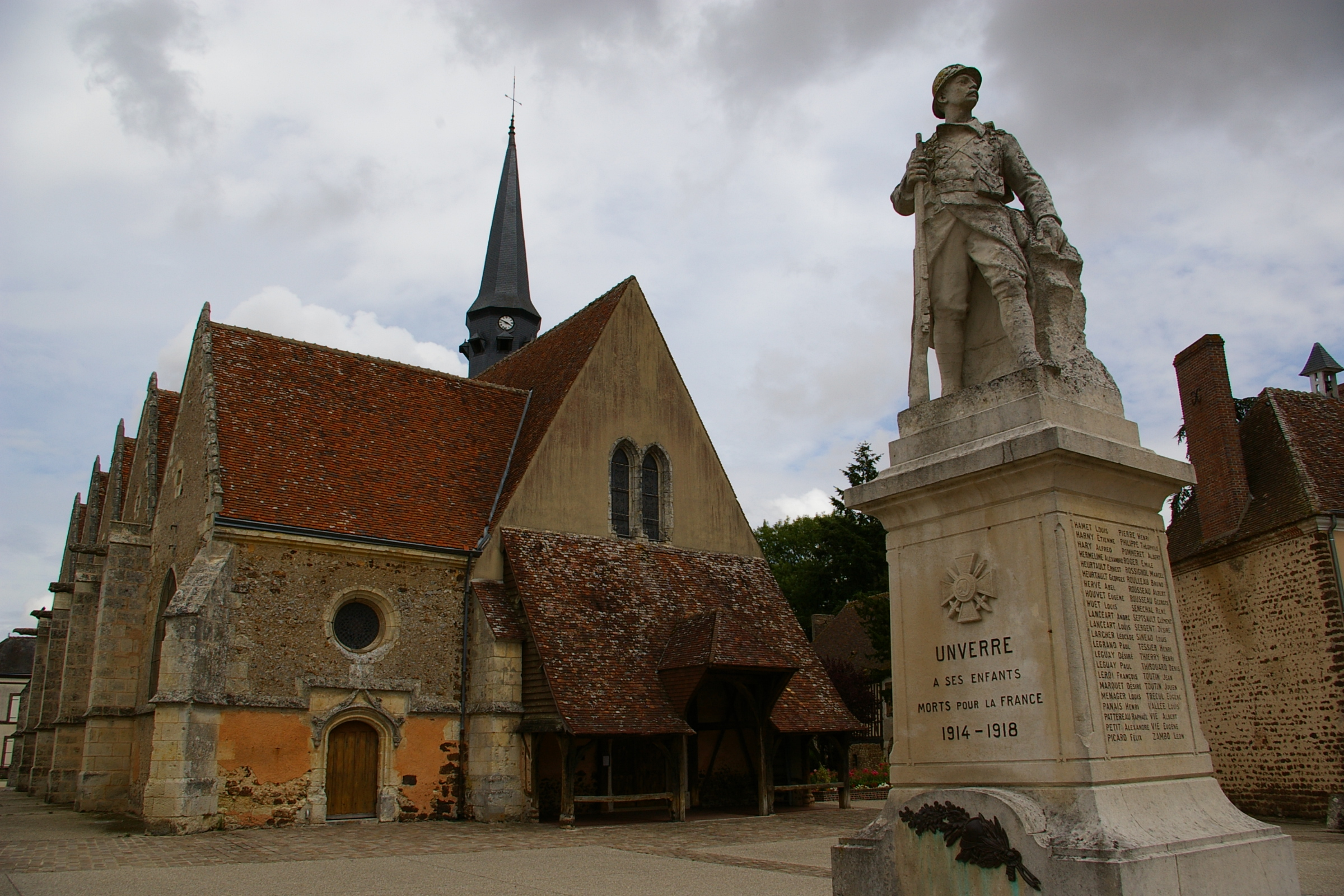
Church at Unverre with Charpentier's war memorial in foreground
Eure-et-Loir.

== Reproductions in bronze ==
A good number of Charpentier's works have been reproduced in limited editions, these in varying sizes. Many are in bronze and others in "Biscuit de Sèvres"

== Gallery ==
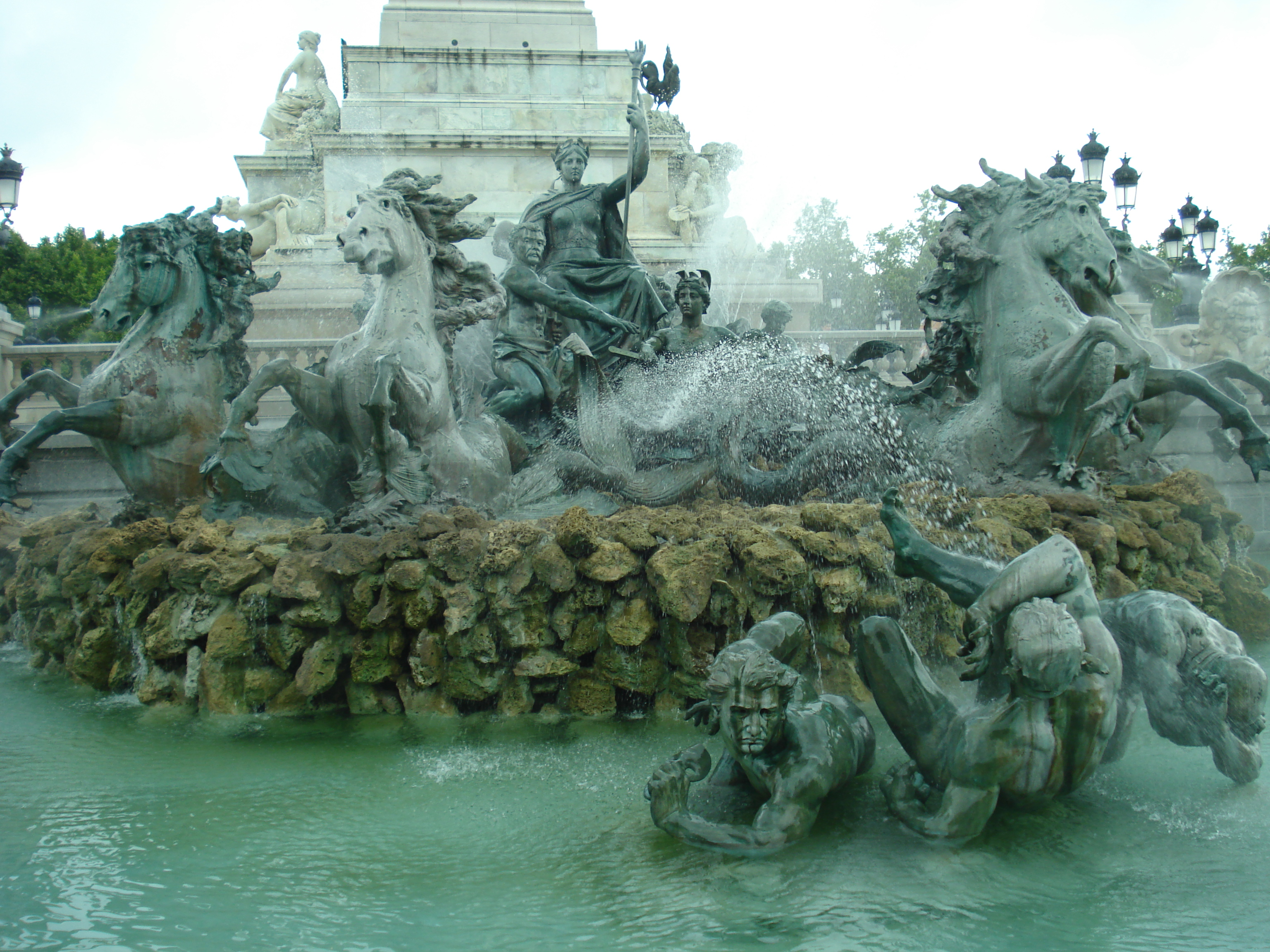
Part of the sculptural work on the fountains of the Gironde monument.

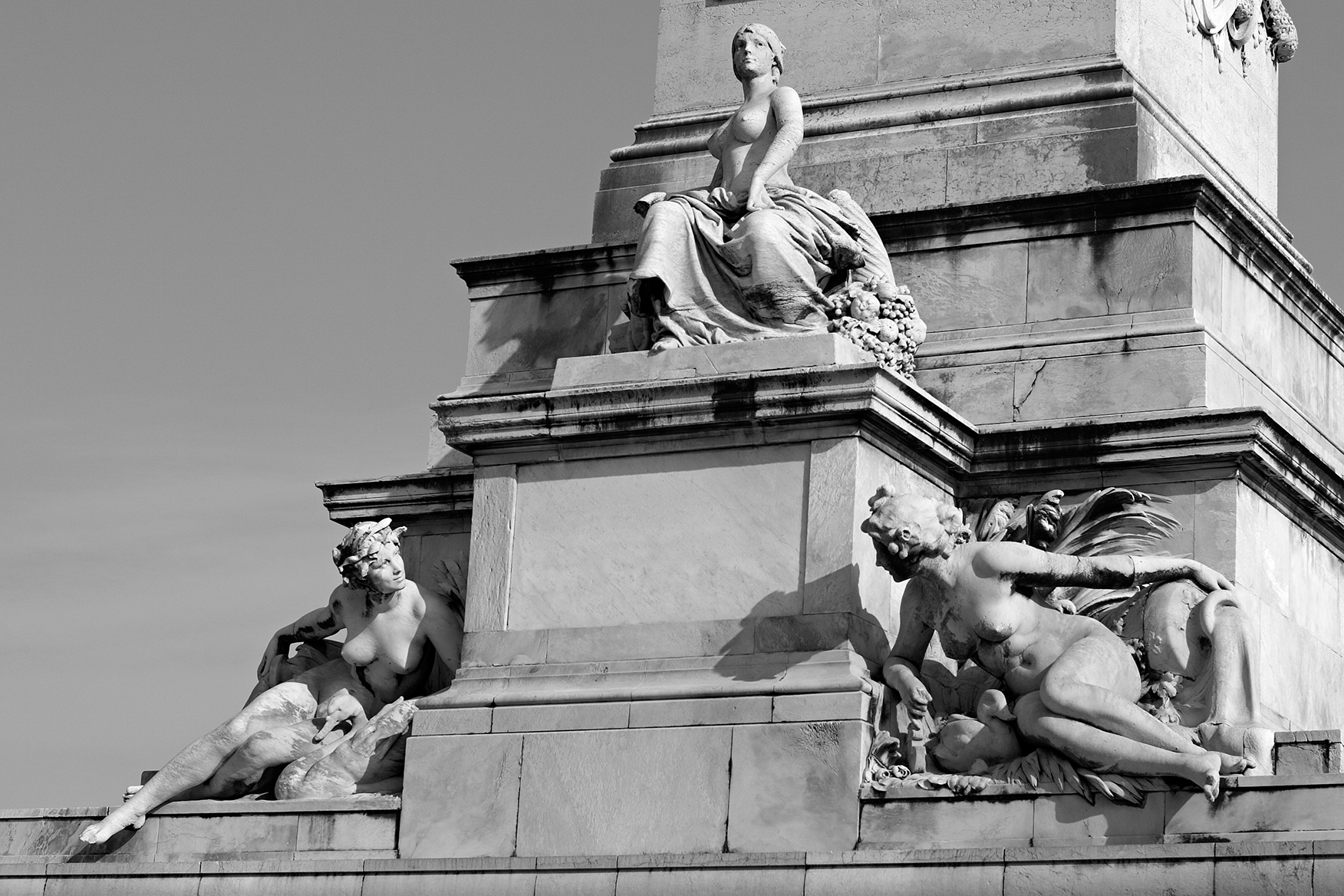
Part of the Monument to the Girondin by Félix Charpentier.

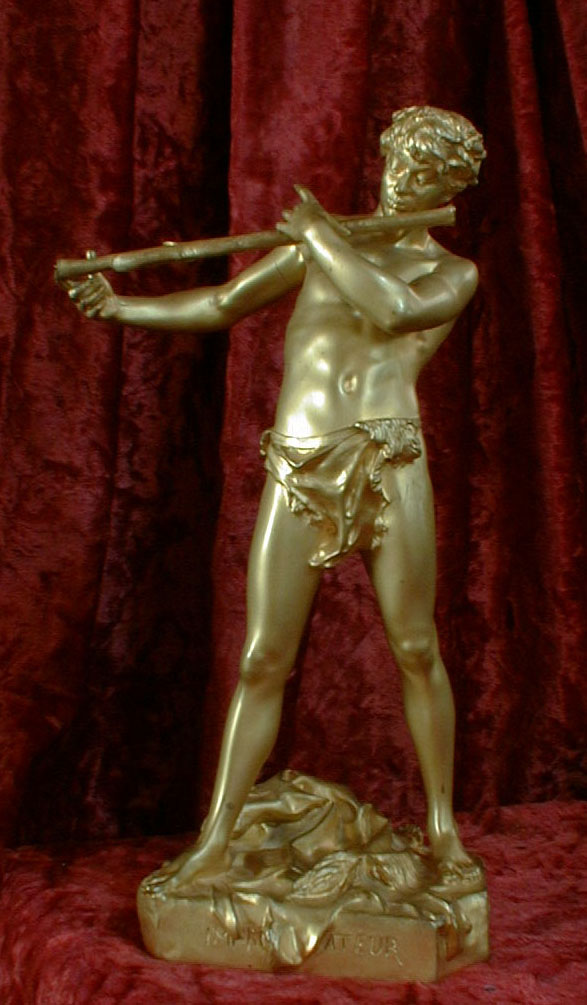
Félix Charpentier's "L'improvisateur"

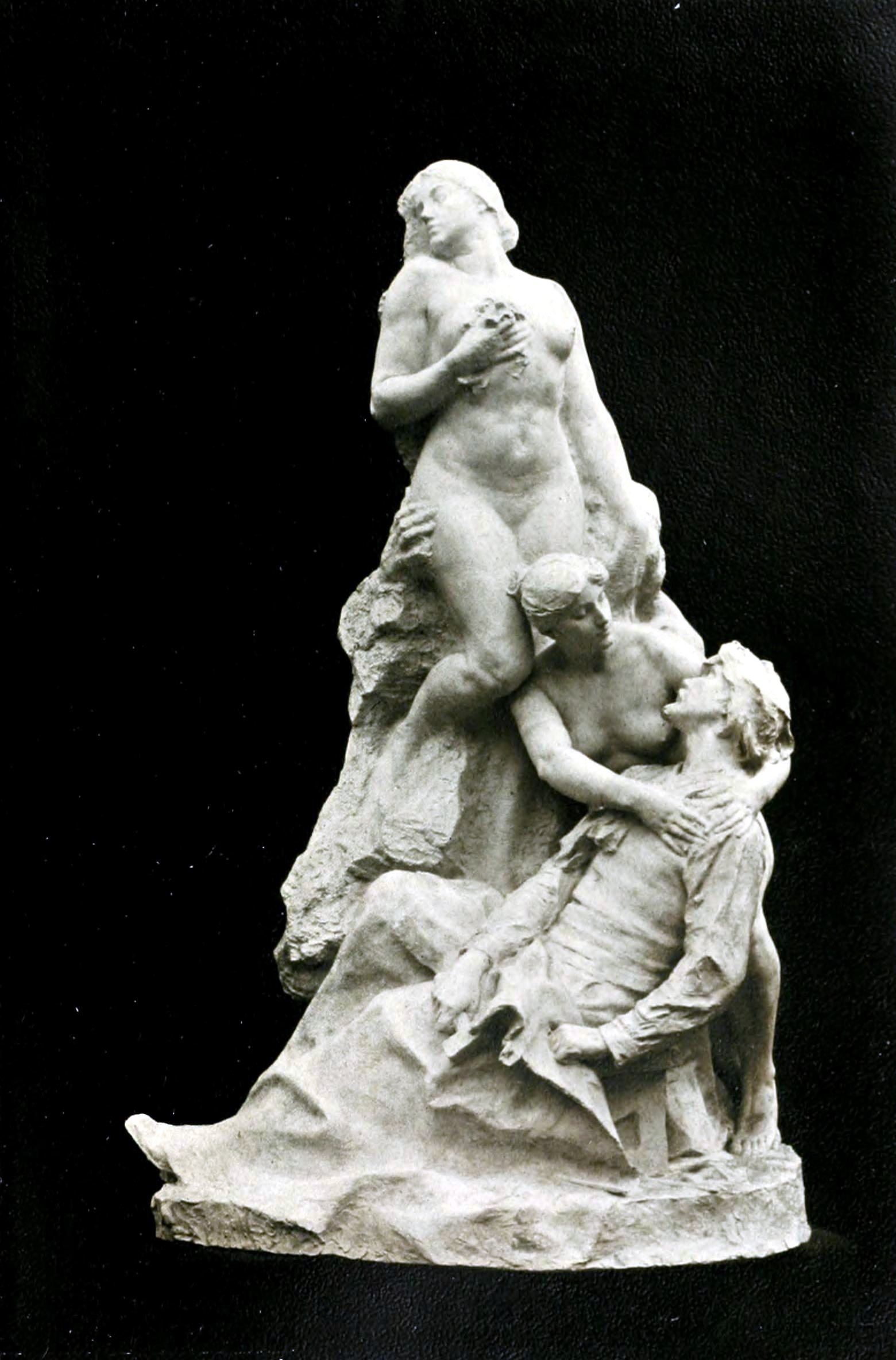
"La Tache" by Félix Charpentier.

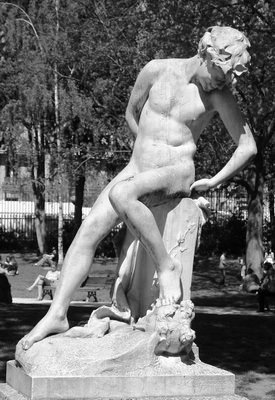
Statue in Paris park (Parc Monceau) "Le Jeune Faune" by Félix Charpentier

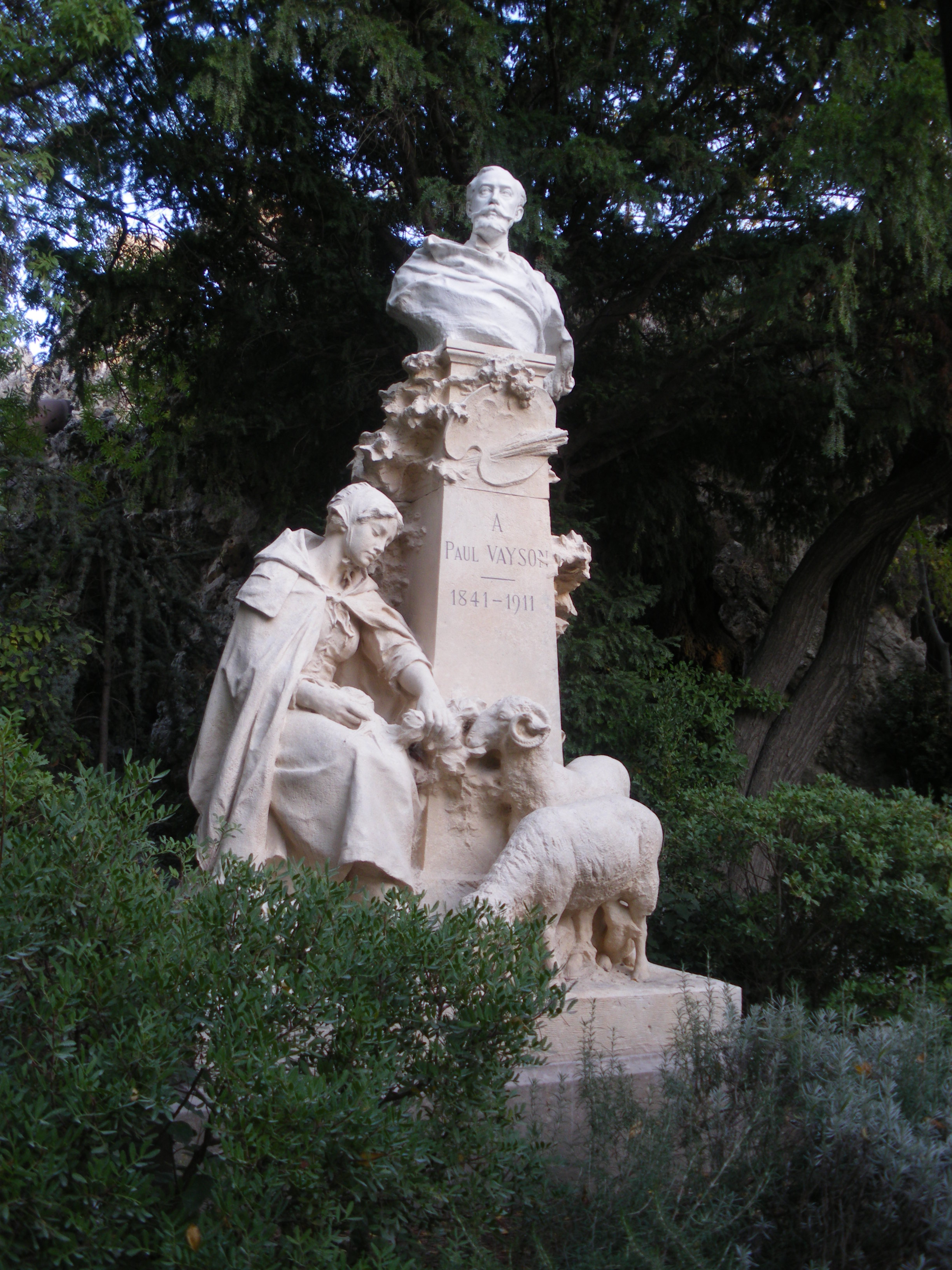
Monument to Paul Veyson by Félix Charpentier

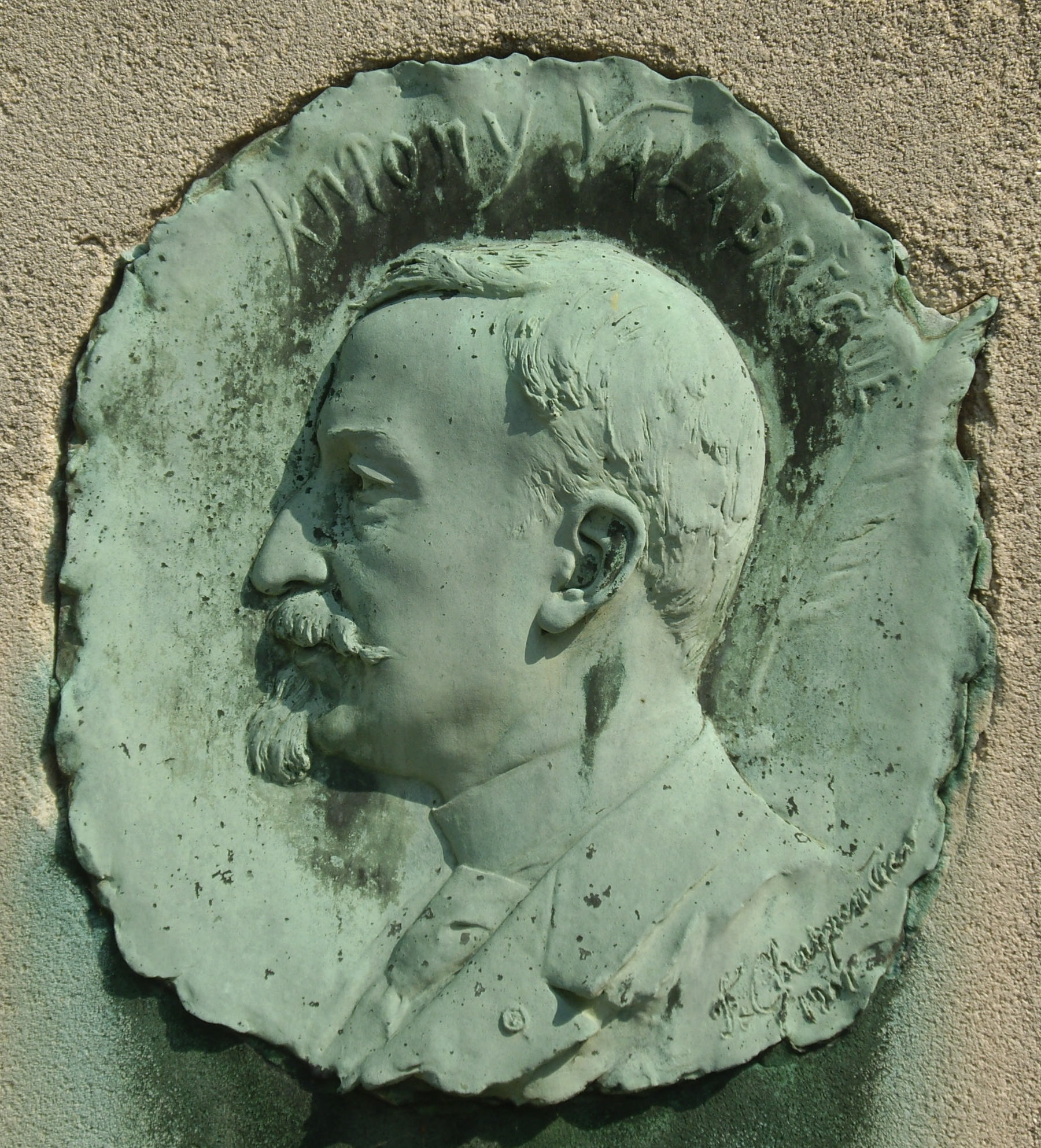
Antony Valabrègue medallion by Félix Charpentier in the Cimetière du Montparnasse.

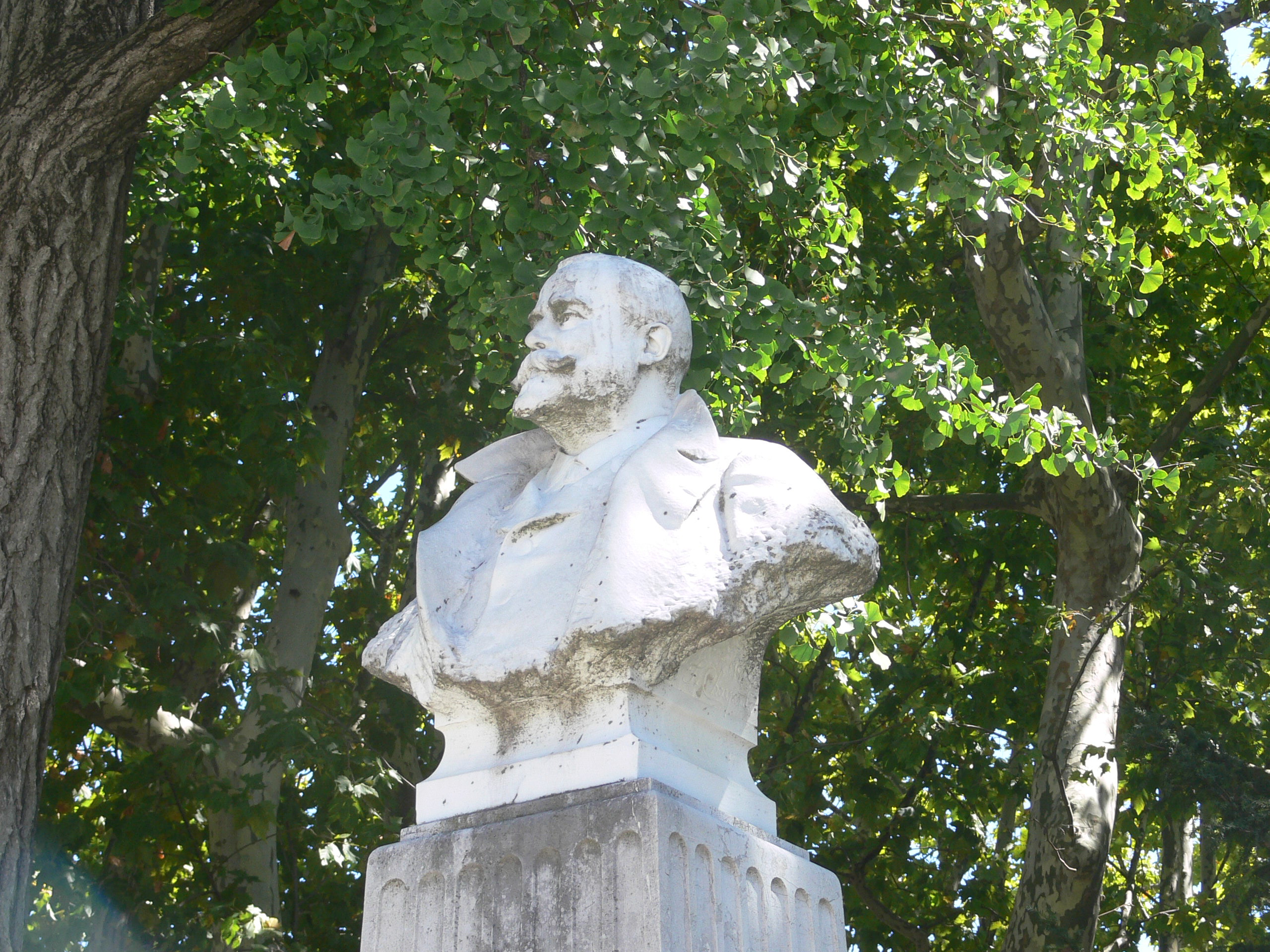
Bust of Paul Saïn in Avignon's Jardin des Doms

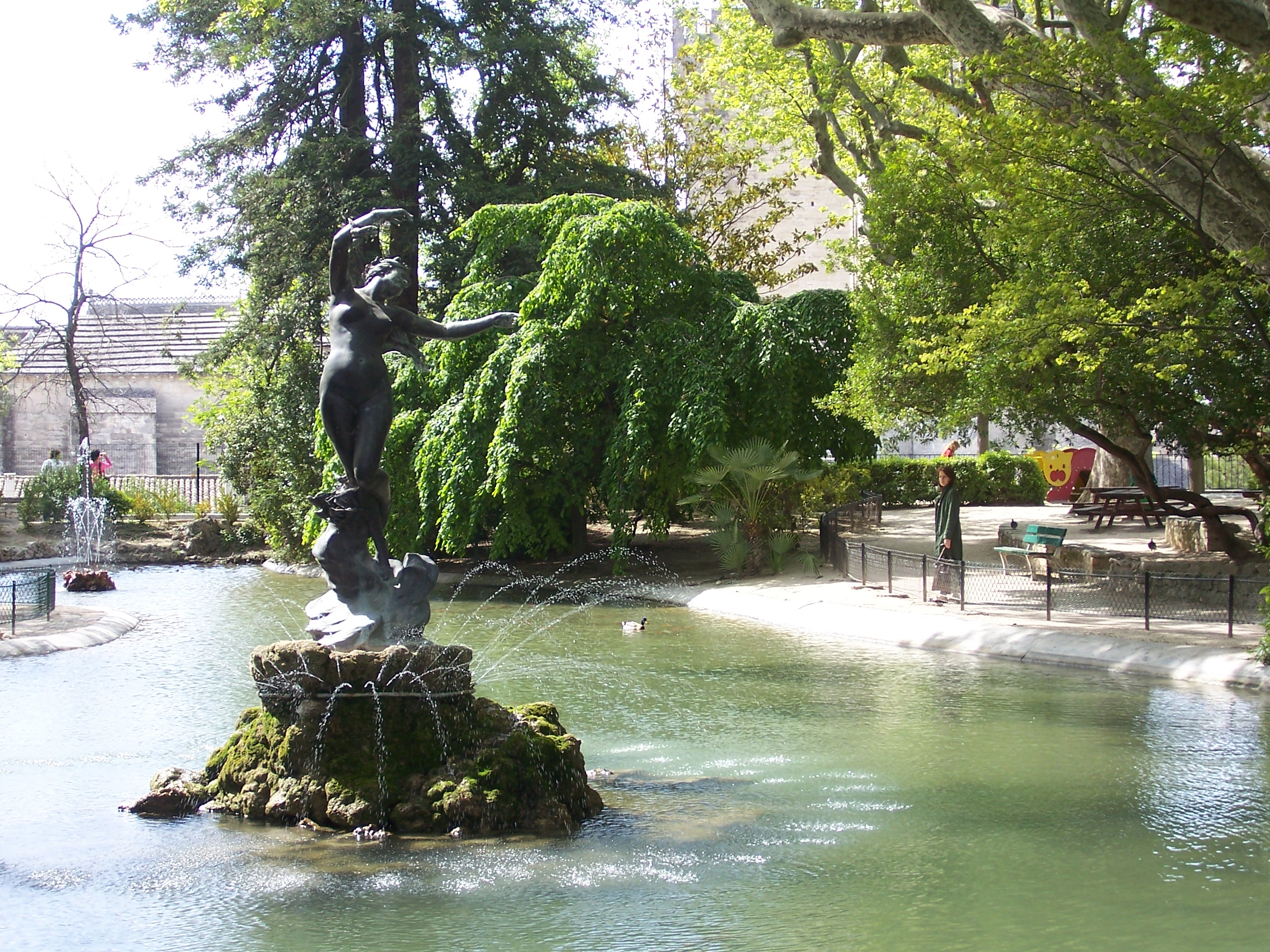
"L'adieux d'une hirondelle"- Farewell from a swallow by Félix Charpentier

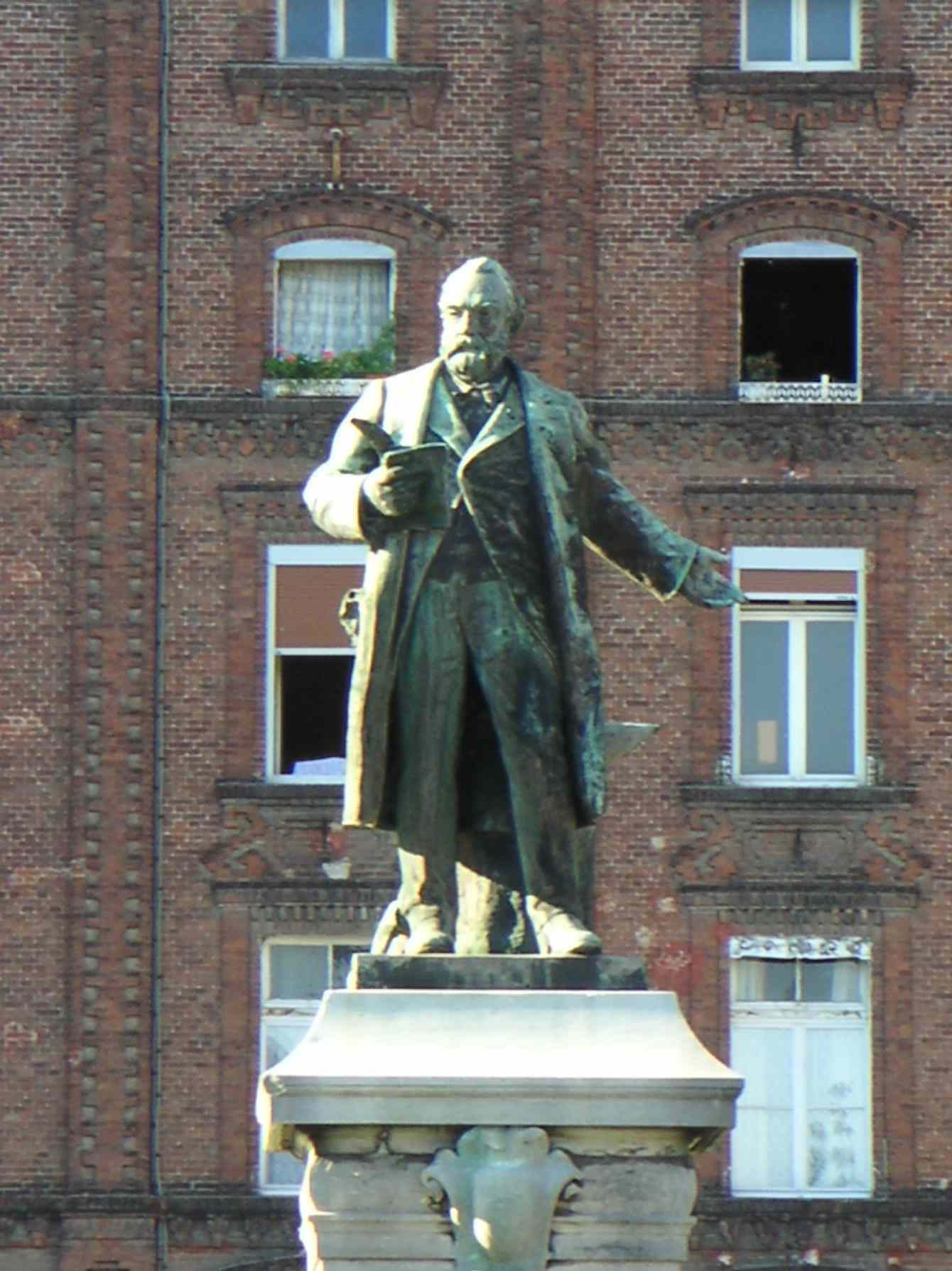
Jean-Baptiste Godin, Statue at Guise.

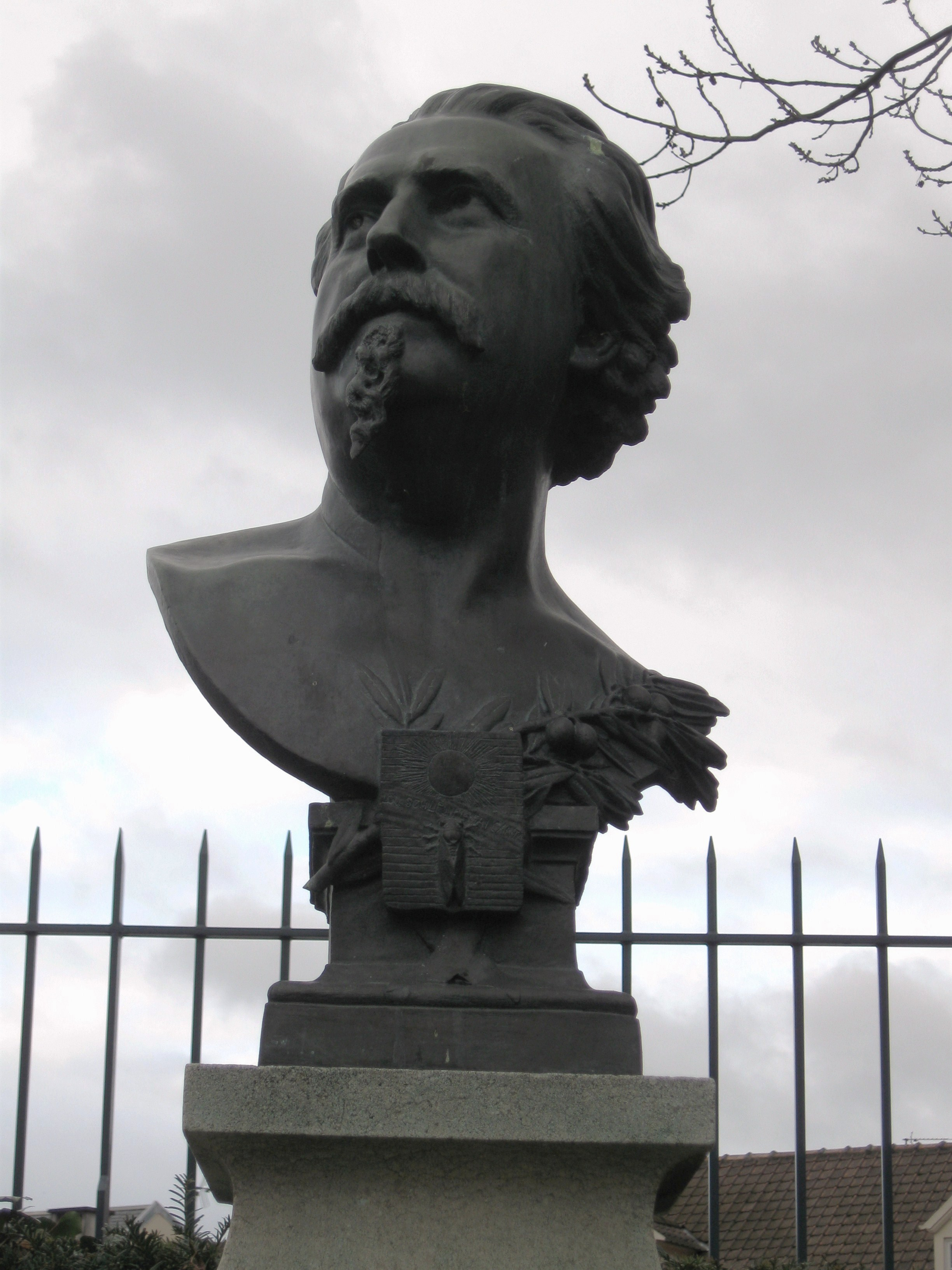
Bust of Mistral in Sceaux by Félix Charpentier

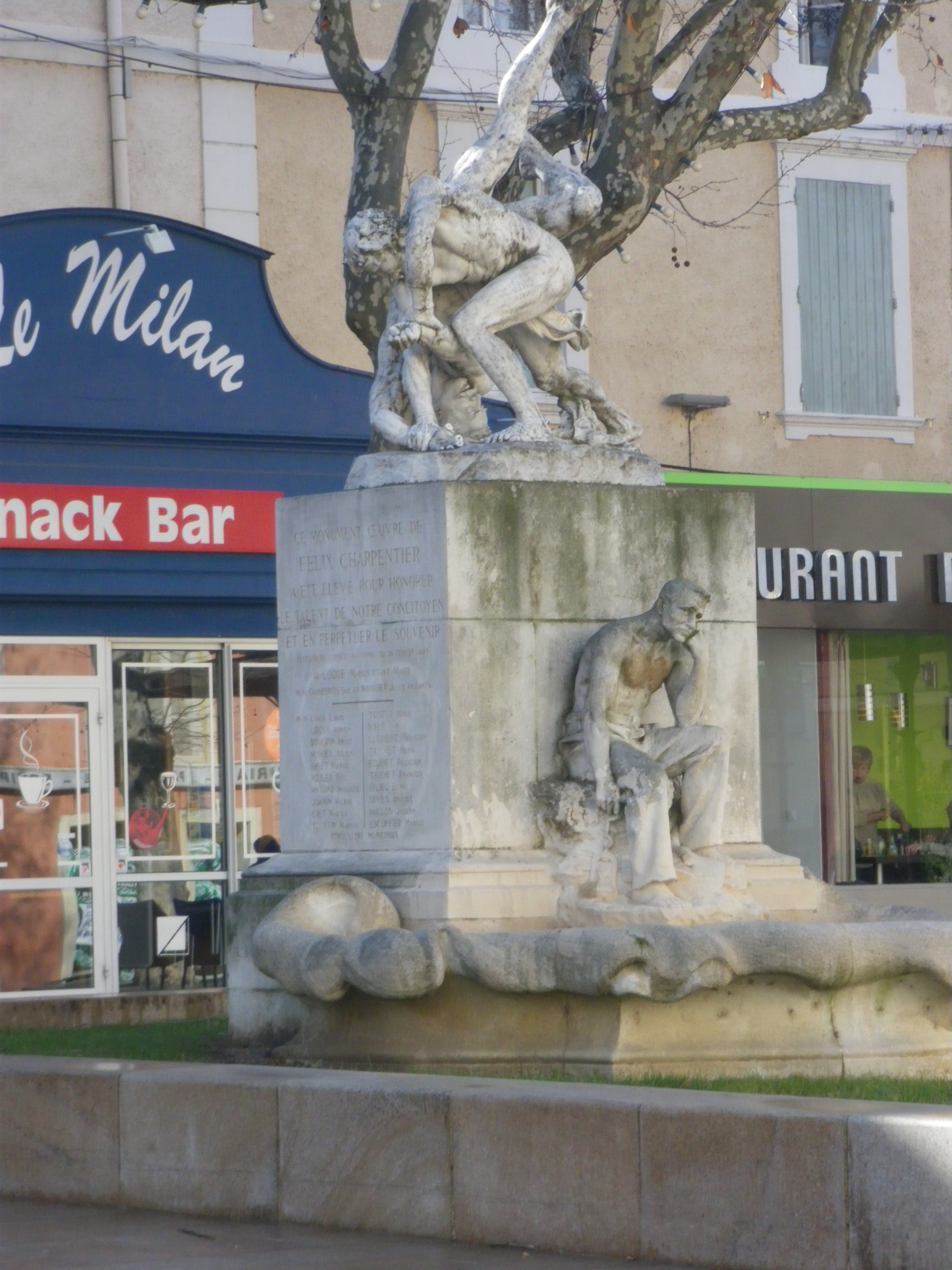
Les Lutteurs. Statue in Bollène by Félix Charpentier

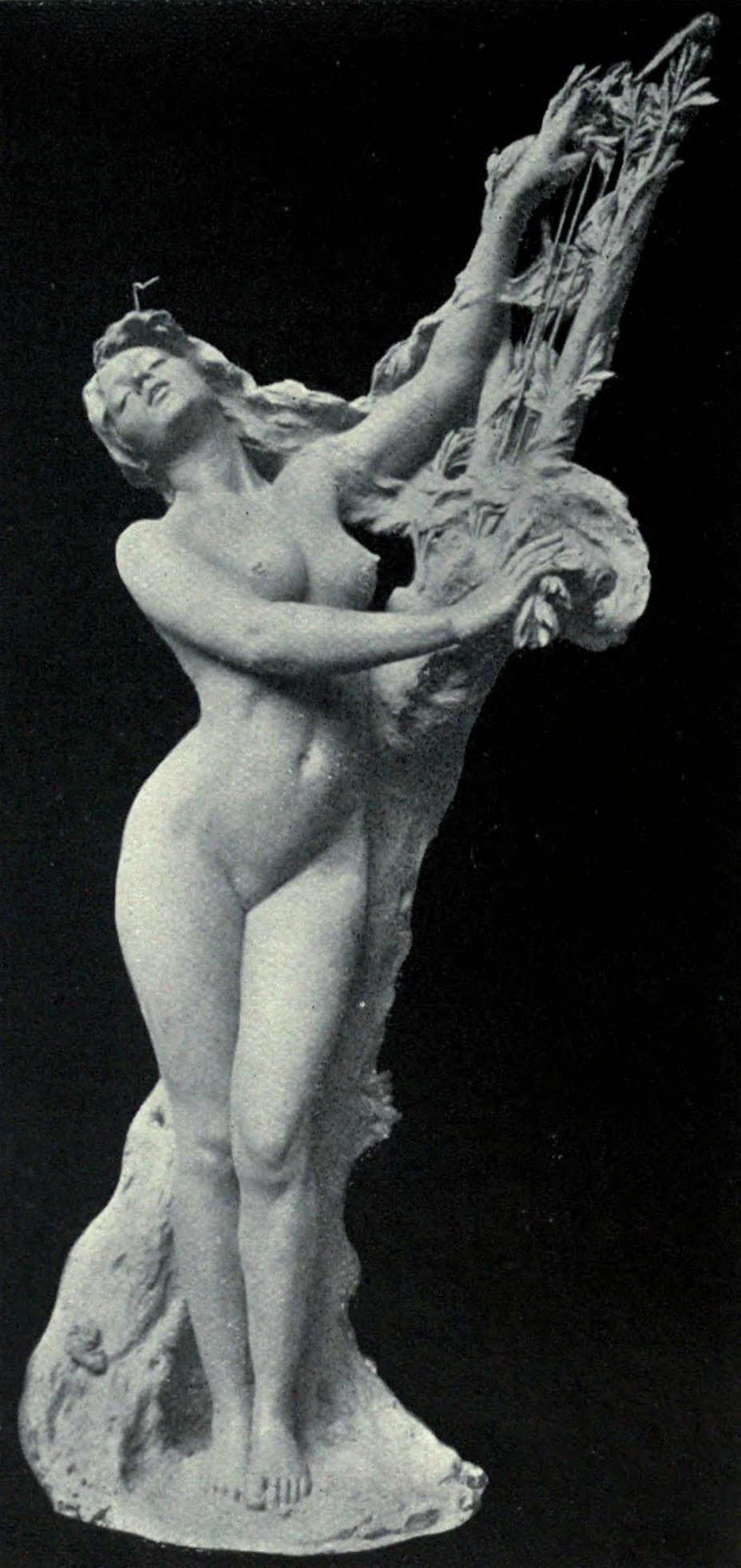
"Le dernier chant d'une cigale". The last song of a cricket by Félix Charpentier

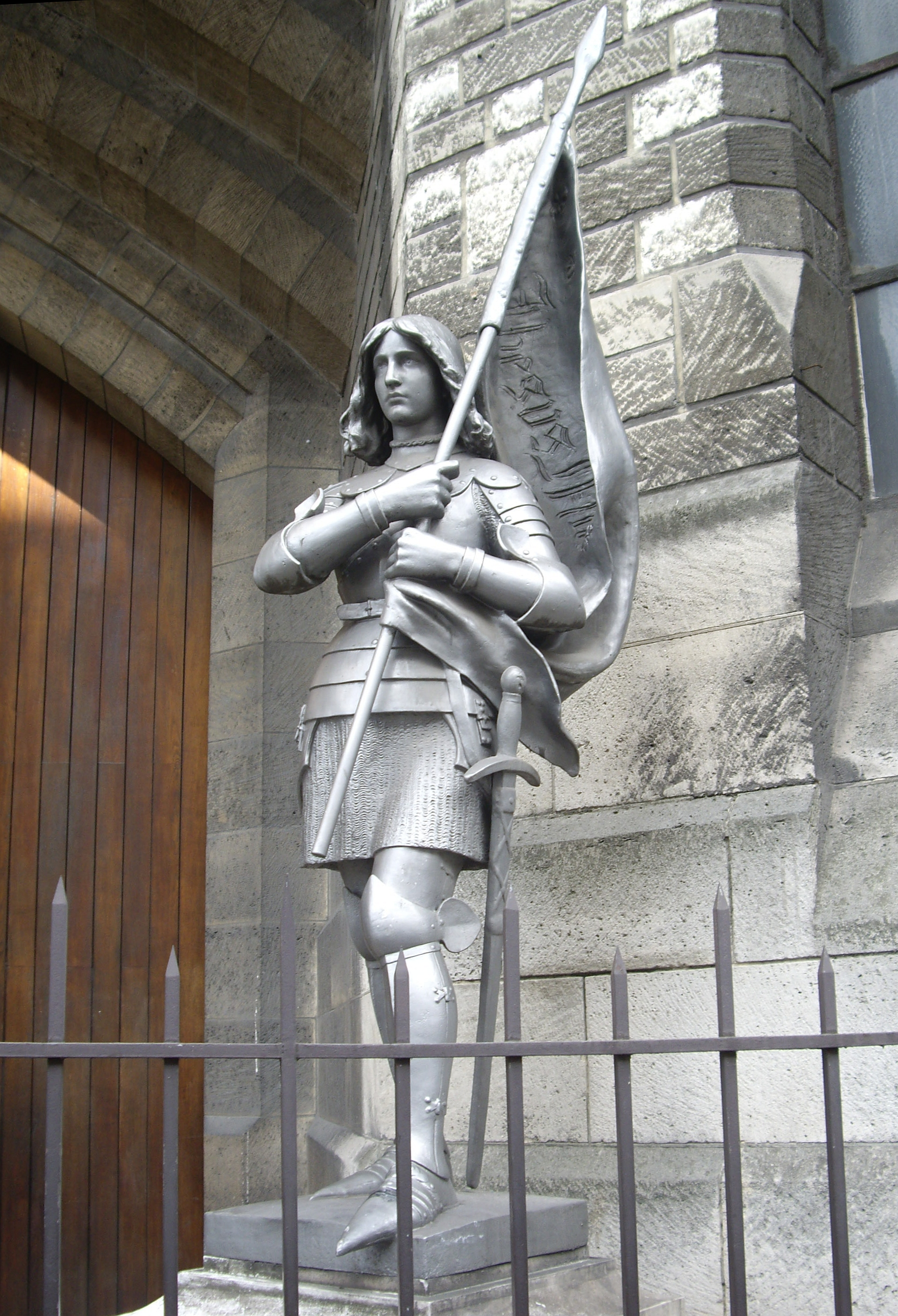
Joan of Arc statue in front of Basilique Sainte-Jeanne-d'Arc in Paris.

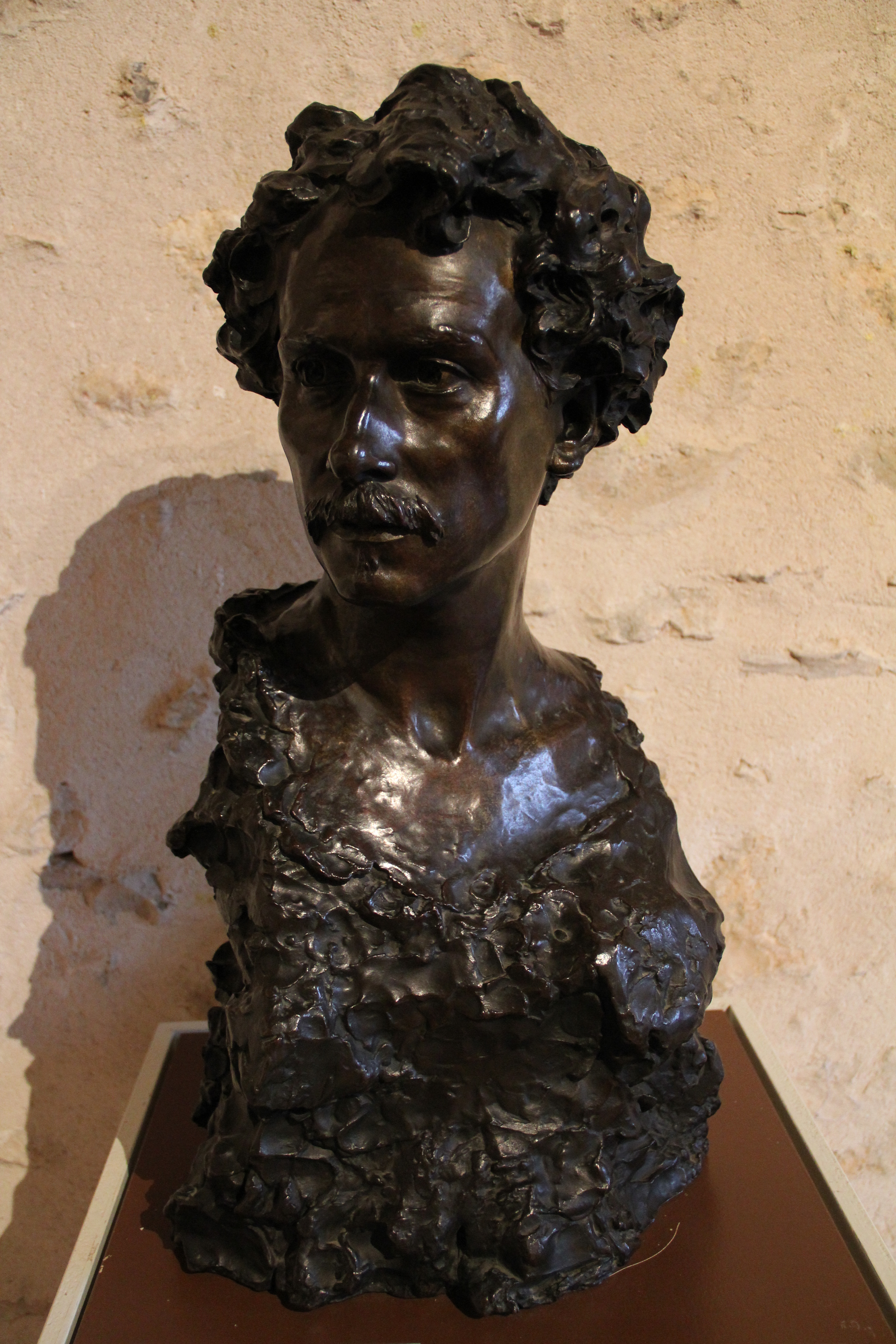
Bust of Camille Gaté by Félix Charpentier. Camille Gaté was an artist and sculptor. Held in Nogent-le-Rotrou's museum.
