= Béville-le-Comte =

- Commune
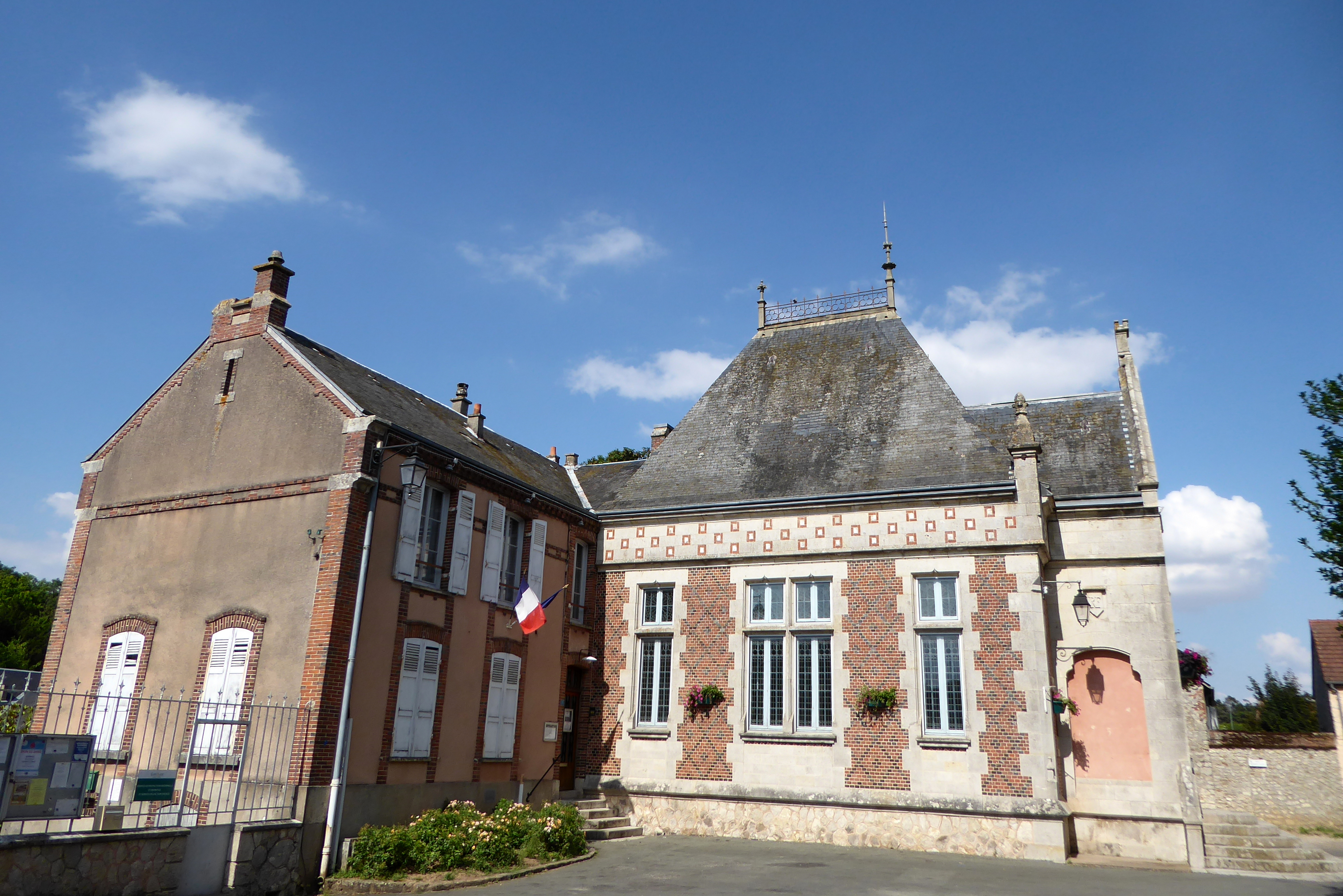
- The town hall in Béville-le-Comte
- Location of Béville-le-Comte
- Location within France Location within Centre-Val de Loire
- Coordinates: 48°26′14″N 1°42′51″E
- Country: France
- Region: Centre-Val de Loire
- Department: Eure-et-Loir
- Arrondissement: Chartres
- Canton: Auneau

Government
  - Mayor (2020–2026): Éric Ségard
- Area^{1}: 20.12 km^{2} (7.77 sq mi)
- Elevation: 148 m (486 ft)
- Highest elevation: 158 m (518 ft)
- Lowest elevation: 122 m (400 ft)
- Population (2023): 1,705
  - Density: 84.74/km^{2} (219.5/sq mi)
- Time zone: UTC+01:00 (CET)
  - Summer (DST): UTC+02:00 (CEST)
- INSEE/Postal code: 28039 /28700
- ^{1} French Land Register data, which excludes lakes, ponds, glaciers > 1 km^{2} (0.386 sq mi or 247 acres) and river estuaries.

Béville-le-Comte (French pronunciation: [bevil lə kɔ̃t]) is a commune in the Eure-et-Loir department in northern France.

== Population ==
Historical population
Year	Pop.	±% p.a.
1968	840	—
1975	949	+1.76%
1982	1,093	+2.04%
1990	1,210	+1.28%
1999	1,335	+1.10%
2007	1,415	+0.73%
2012	1,490	+1.04%
2017	1,657	+2.15%
2023	1,705	+0.48%
Source: INSEE

== See also ==
- Communes of the Eure-et-Loir department
- Félix Charpentier. Sculptor of Béville-le-Comte War Memorial
