= Paul Saïn =

French painter (1853–1908)

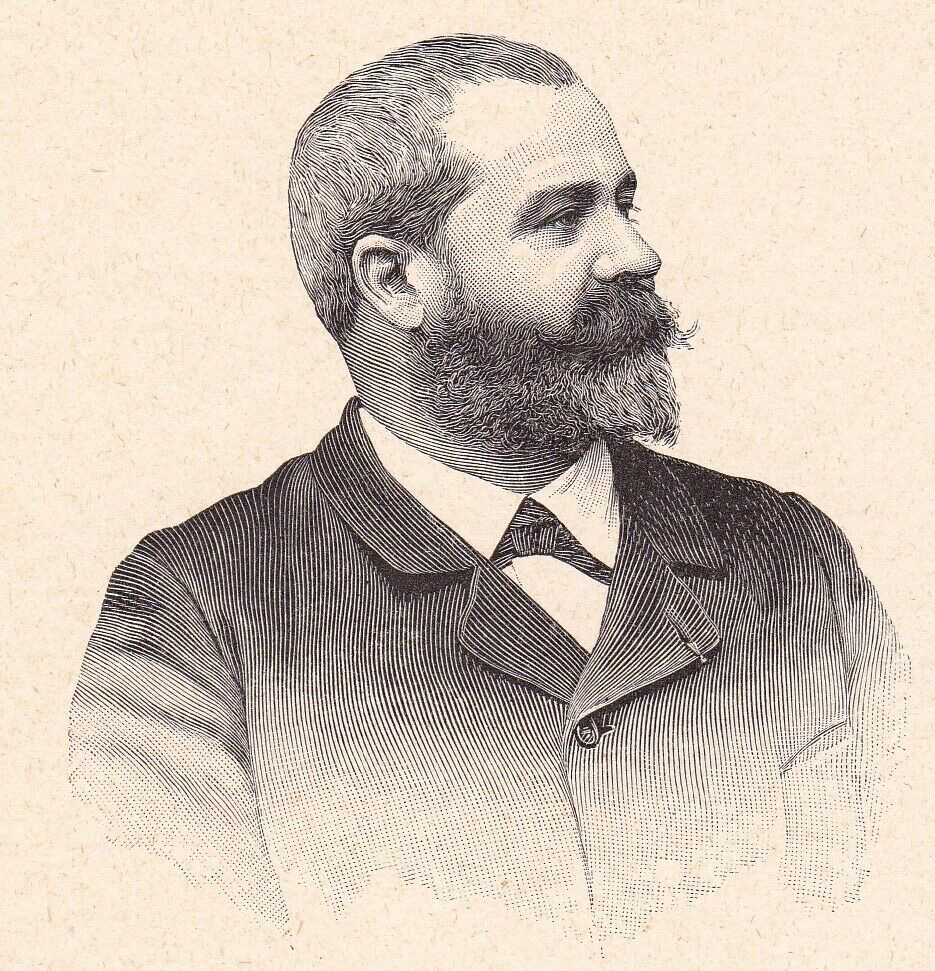
- Portrait by an unknown artist (c.1900)
- Born: 5 December 1853; Avignon, France
- Died: 6 March 1908; Avignon, France
- Resting place: Cemetery of Saint-Véran, Avignon
- Education: École des Beaux-Arts d'Avignon

Jean-Paul Marie Saïn (5 December 1853, Avignon – 6 March 1908, Avignon) was a French painter, known primarily for landscapes and portraits.

== Biography ==
He studied at the "École des Beaux-Arts d'Avignon", where he received first prize for painting from live models and, in 1873, a prize for drawing from the Musée Calvet. These awards brought him a scholarship to study in Paris at the École des Beaux-Arts in the workshop of Jean-Léon Gérôme, where he remained until 1877. After that, he shared a studio with Paul Avril and several others.

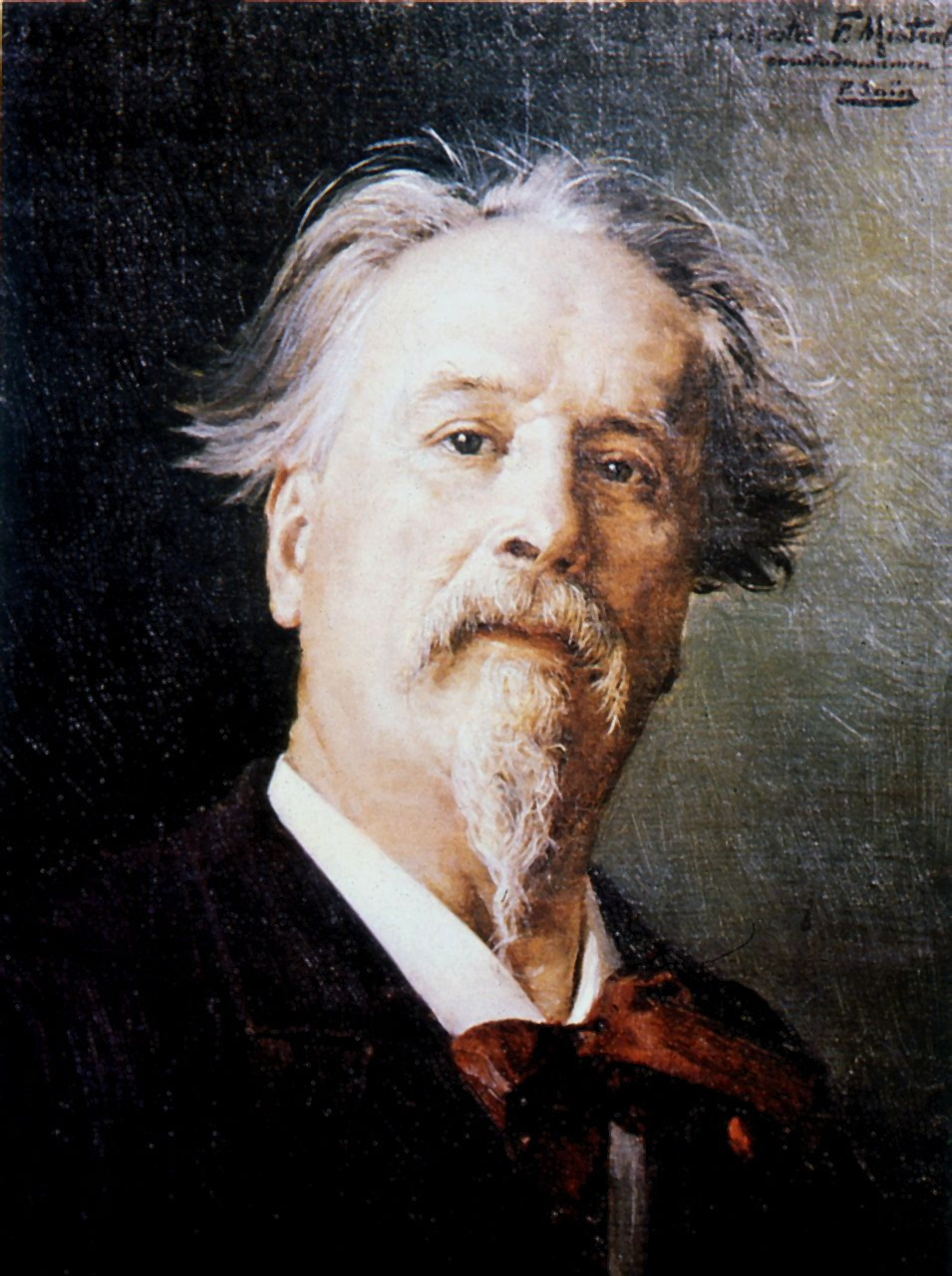
Portrait of Frédéric Mistral by Paul Saïn

At the time, he mostly painted seascapes. His first exhibit at the Salon was in 1879, but he did not begin to show there on a regular basis until 1887. Later, together with his friend, Pierre Grivolas and his student, Louis Agricol Montagné, he would visit the banks of the Rhône, near Avignon, and the village of Les Angles to paint en plein aire.

He became a frequent visitor to Saint-Céneri-le-Gérei, a picturesque village that attracted many painters, and would come to live there for twenty-five years. He made numerous portraits in nearby Moisy, at the local inn, and is believed to have created more than 1600 portraits altogether.

In 1887, he made an extended visit to Algeria and was named a Knight in the Legion of Honor in 1895. Five years later, he was one of numerous artists chosen to provide decorations for the restaurant at the Gare de Lyon (now known as Le Train Bleu), where he painted scenes from Avignon.

He is buried at the Cemetery of Saint-Véran in Avignon and his tomb is decorated with a bronze medallion by Félix Charpentier. A street near there has been named after him and, later, the city of Saint-Céneri-le-Gérei commissioned Christian Malézieux (born 1931), to do a bronze bust of him for the village's main street.
