= Saintigny =

- Commune
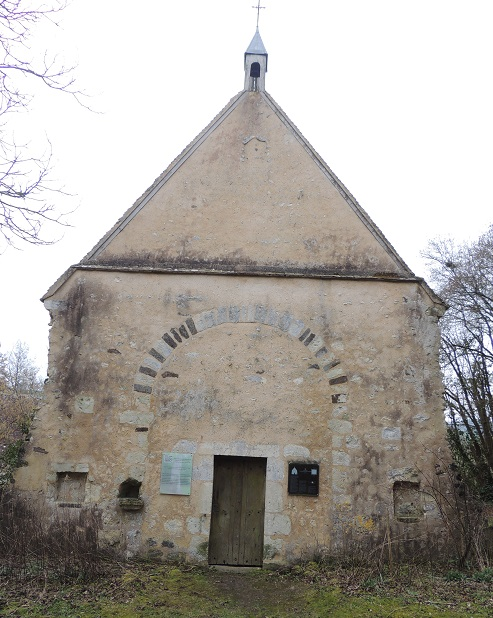
- The chapel in Saint-Denis-d'Authou

- Coat of arms
- Location of Saintigny
- Location within France Location within Centre-Val de Loire
- Coordinates: 48°20′43″N 0°59′15″E
- Country: France
- Region: Centre-Val de Loire
- Department: Eure-et-Loir
- Arrondissement: Nogent-le-Rotrou
- Canton: Nogent-le-Rotrou
- Intercommunality: Terres de Perche

Government
  - Mayor (2020–2026): Waldeck Rousseau
- Area^{1}: 45.22 km^{2} (17.46 sq mi)
- Highest elevation: 286 m (938 ft)
- Lowest elevation: 158 m (518 ft)
- Population (2023): 922
  - Density: 20.4/km^{2} (52.8/sq mi)
- Time zone: UTC+01:00 (CET)
  - Summer (DST): UTC+02:00 (CEST)
- INSEE/Postal code: 28331 /28480
- ^{1} French Land Register data, which excludes lakes, ponds, glaciers > 1 km^{2} (0.386 sq mi or 247 acres) and river estuaries.

Saintigny (French pronunciation: [sɛ̃tiɲi]) is a commune in the Eure-et-Loir department in northern France. It was established on 1 January 2019 by merger of the former communes of Saint-Denis-d'Authou (the seat) and Frétigny.

== Geography ==
The Commune along with another 70 communes shares part of a 47,681 hectare, Natura 2000 conservation area, called the Forêts et étangs du Perche.

== See also ==
- Communes of the Eure-et-Loir department
