= Sainte-Cécile-les-Vignes =

- Commune
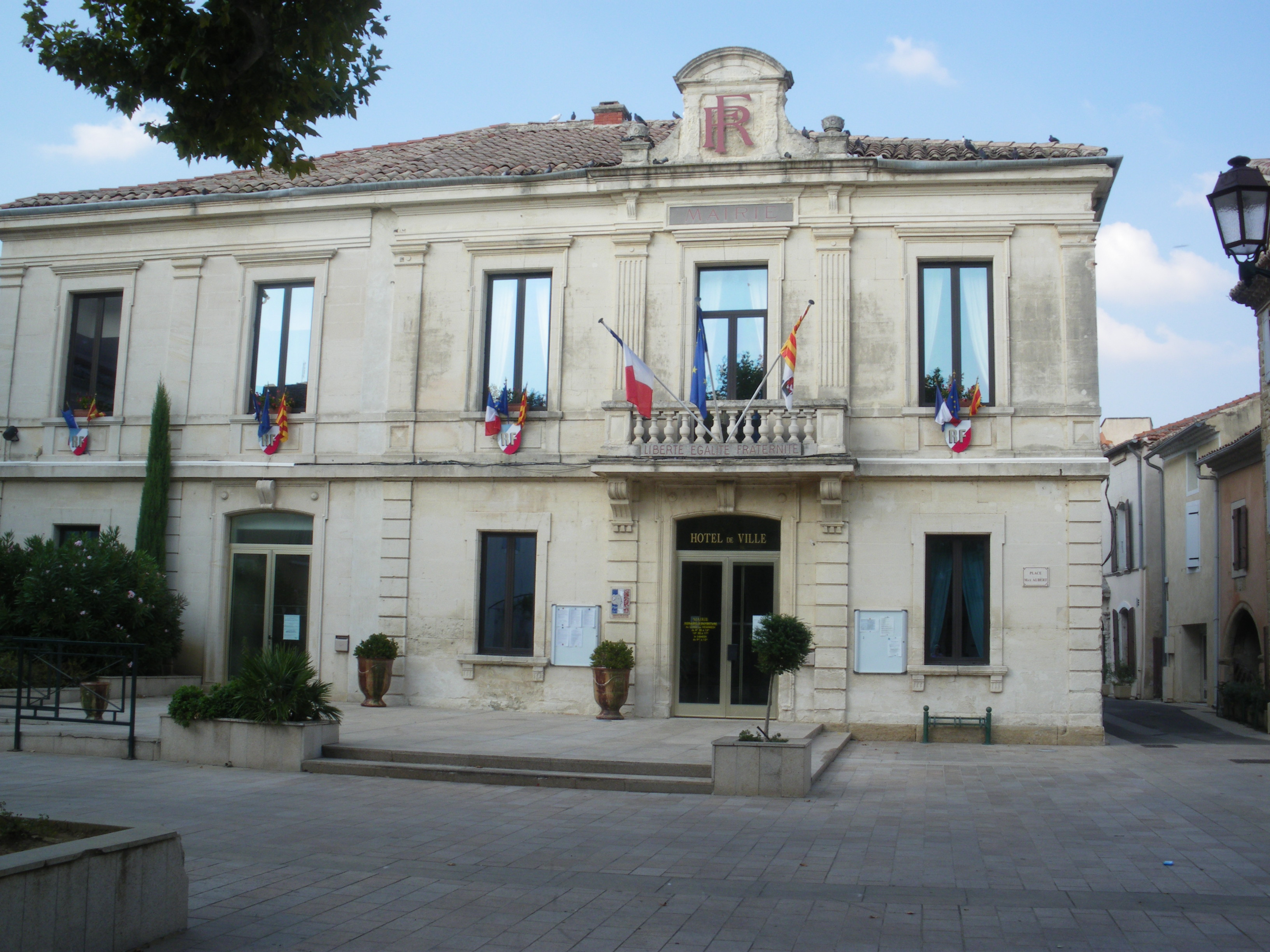
- Town hall

- Coat of arms
- Location of Sainte-Cécile-les-Vignes
- Location within France Location within Provence-Alpes-Côte d'Azur
- Coordinates: 44°14′47″N 4°53′13″E
- Country: France
- Region: Provence-Alpes-Côte d'Azur
- Department: Vaucluse
- Arrondissement: Carpentras
- Canton: Bollène
- Intercommunality: Aygues Ouvèze en Provence

Government
  - Mayor (2020–2026): Vincent Faure
- Area^{1}: 19.82 km^{2} (7.65 sq mi)
- Elevation: 130 m (430 ft)
- Highest elevation: 138 m (453 ft)
- Lowest elevation: 83 m (272 ft)
- Population (2023): 2,656
  - Density: 134.0/km^{2} (347.1/sq mi)
- Time zone: UTC+01:00 (CET)
  - Summer (DST): UTC+02:00 (CEST)
- INSEE/Postal code: 84106 /84290
- ^{1} French Land Register data, which excludes lakes, ponds, glaciers > 1 km^{2} (0.386 sq mi or 247 acres) and river estuaries.

Sainte-Cécile-les-Vignes (French pronunciation: [sɛ̃t sesil le viɲ]; Provençal: Santa Celha dei Vinhas) is a commune in the Vaucluse department in the Provence-Alpes-Côte d'Azur region in southeastern France.

Nearby cities are Orange and the smaller Bollène. It is also not far from the Mont Ventoux.

Maurice Trintignant, a motor racing driver and vintner, was born here on 30 October 1917.

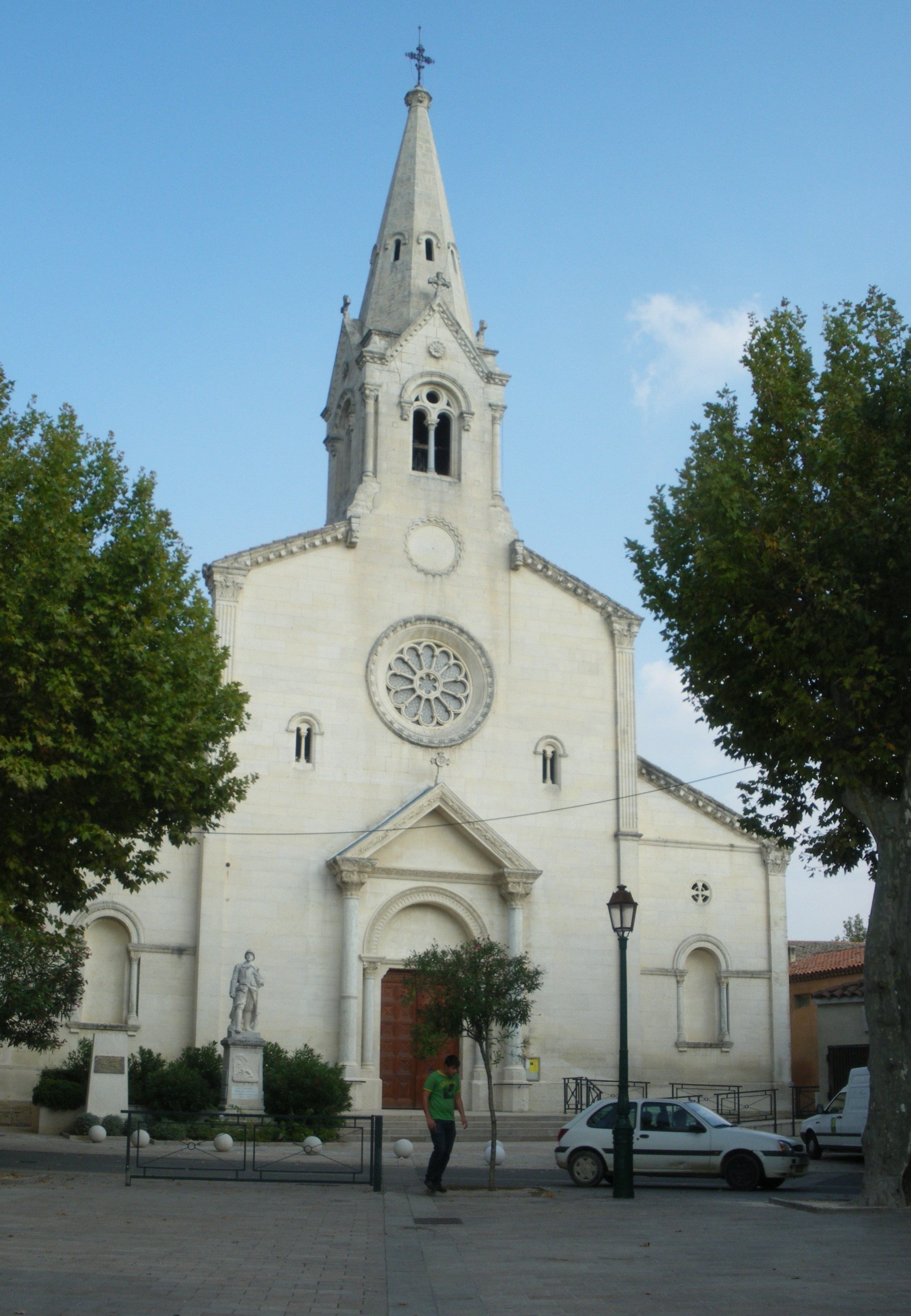
The church of Sainte-Cécile-les-Vignes

== Population ==
Historical population
Year	Pop.	±% p.a.
1968	1,735	—
1975	1,644	−0.77%
1982	1,818	+1.45%
1990	1,927	+0.73%
1999	2,100	+0.96%
2007	2,214	+0.66%
2012	2,369	+1.36%
2017	2,505	+1.12%
2023	2,656	+0.98%
Source: INSEE

== Twin towns ==
- (France) Auzances, Limousin

== See also ==
- Communes of the Vaucluse department
- Félix Charpentier Sculptor of Sainte-Cécile-les-Vignes War Memorial
