= Fruncé =

- Commune
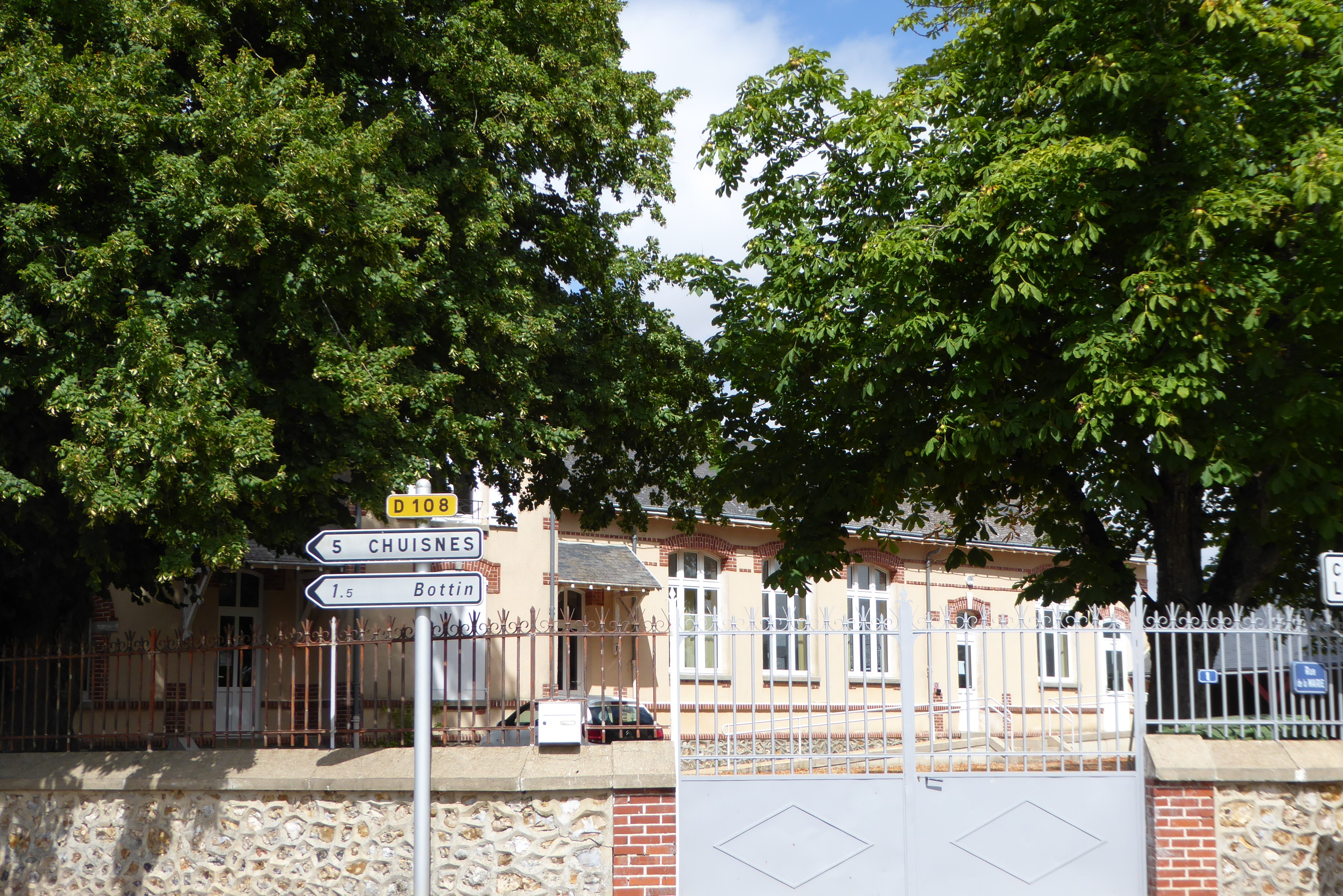
- The town hall in Fruncé
- Location of Fruncé
- Location within France Location within Centre-Val de Loire
- Coordinates: 48°24′24″N 1°13′30″E
- Country: France
- Region: Centre-Val de Loire
- Department: Eure-et-Loir
- Arrondissement: Chartres
- Canton: Illiers-Combray

Government
  - Mayor (2020–2026): Olivier Daniel
- Area^{1}: 16.97 km^{2} (6.55 sq mi)
- Elevation: 188 m (617 ft)
- Highest elevation: 229 m (751 ft)
- Lowest elevation: 174 m (571 ft)
- Population (2023): 376
  - Density: 22.2/km^{2} (57.4/sq mi)
- Time zone: UTC+01:00 (CET)
  - Summer (DST): UTC+02:00 (CEST)
- INSEE/Postal code: 28167 /28190
- ^{1} French Land Register data, which excludes lakes, ponds, glaciers > 1 km^{2} (0.386 sq mi or 247 acres) and river estuaries.

Fruncé (French pronunciation: [fʁœ̃se]) is a commune in the Eure-et-Loir department in northern France.

== Population ==
Historical population
Year	Pop.	±% p.a.
1968	288	—
1975	228	−3.28%
1982	236	+0.49%
1990	275	+1.93%
1999	299	+0.93%
2007	324	+1.01%
2012	386	+3.56%
2017	405	+0.97%
2023	376	−1.23%
Source: INSEE

== See also ==
- Communes of the Eure-et-Loir department
- Félix Charpentier. Sculptor of Fruncé War Memorial
