= Auzances =

Commune in Nouvelle-Aquitaine, France

- Commune
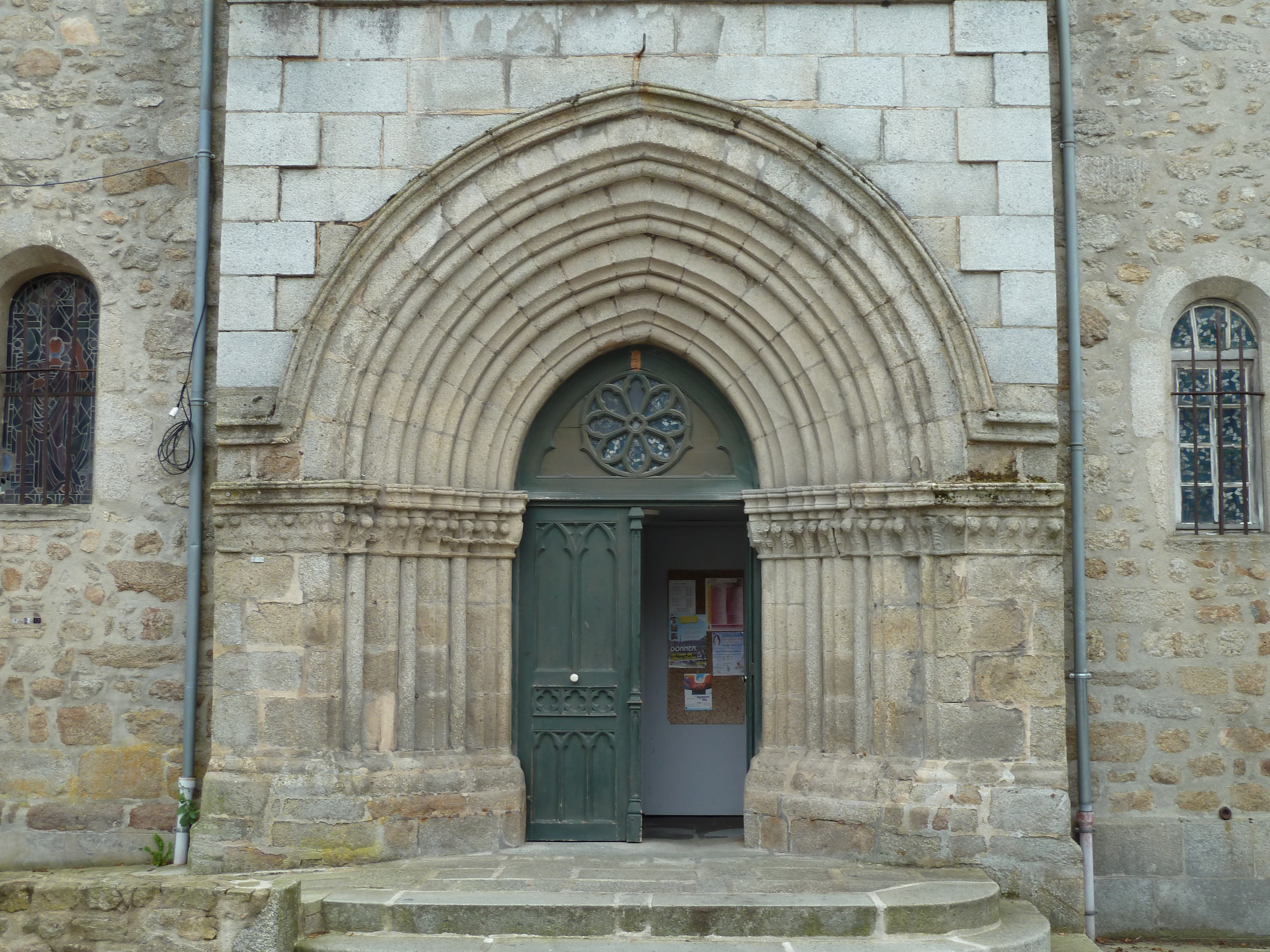
- The doors of the church of Saint-Jacques, in Auzances

- Coat of arms
- Location of Auzances
- Location within France Location within Nouvelle-Aquitaine
- Coordinates: 46°01′39″N 2°30′06″E
- Country: France
- Region: Nouvelle-Aquitaine
- Department: Creuse
- Arrondissement: Aubusson
- Canton: Auzances
- Intercommunality: CC Marche et Combraille en Aquitaine

Government
  - Mayor (2020–2026): Françoise Simon
- Area^{1}: 7.08 km^{2} (2.73 sq mi)
- Elevation: 545 m (1,788 ft)
- Highest elevation: 624 m (2,047 ft)
- Lowest elevation: 486 m (1,594 ft)
- Population (2023): 1,129
  - Density: 159/km^{2} (413/sq mi)
- Time zone: UTC+01:00 (CET)
  - Summer (DST): UTC+02:00 (CEST)
- INSEE/Postal code: 23013 /23700
- ^{1} French Land Register data, which excludes lakes, ponds, glaciers > 1 km^{2} (0.386 sq mi or 247 acres) and river estuaries.

Auzances (French pronunciation: [ozɑ̃s]; Auvergnat: Ausança) is a commune in the Creuse department in the Nouvelle-Aquitaine region in central France.

== Geography ==
A small farming and light industrial town situated by the left bank of the river La Noisette, not far from the Cher, some 16 miles (26 km) northeast of Aubusson at the junction of the D4, D988 and D996 roads. The commune is served by local coaches.

== Population ==
Historical population
Year	Pop.	±% p.a.
1968	1,566	—
1975	1,665	+0.88%
1982	1,732	+0.57%
1990	1,536	−1.49%
1999	1,371	−1.25%
2007	1,374	+0.03%
2012	1,300	−1.10%
2017	1,214	−1.36%
2023	1,129	−1.20%
Source: INSEE

== Sights ==
- Considerable evidence of Roman occupation: villas and tombs,
- The church of St.Jacques, dating from the thirteenth century.
- Several watermills.
- The seventeenth century Montpensier house, with 2 towers.
- The sixteenth century chapel of Sainte-Anne.
- The seventeenth century chapel of Sainte-Marguerite.

== Personalities ==
- Jean Taillandier, professional footballer, was born here in 1938.
- Jean Beaufret (1907–1982), philosopher, was born here.

== International relations ==
The following towns are twinned with Auzances :

- Roßtal, Germany
- Sainte-Cécile-les-Vignes, France

== See also ==
- Communes of the Creuse department
