= Saint-Denis-d'Authou =

- Part of Saintigny
- Coat of arms
- Location of Saint-Denis-d'Authou
- Location within France Location within Centre-Val de Loire
- Coordinates: 48°20′43″N 0°59′15″E
- Country: France
- Region: Centre-Val de Loire
- Department: Eure-et-Loir
- Arrondissement: Nogent-le-Rotrou
- Canton: Nogent-le-Rotrou
- Commune: Saintigny
- Area^{1}: 22.23 km^{2} (8.58 sq mi)
- Elevation: 238 m (781 ft)
- Highest elevation: 286 m (938 ft)
- Lowest elevation: 174 m (571 ft)
- Population (2023): 441
  - Density: 19.8/km^{2} (51.4/sq mi)
- Time zone: UTC+01:00 (CET)
  - Summer (DST): UTC+02:00 (CEST)
- Postal code: 28480
- ^{1} French Land Register data, which excludes lakes, ponds, glaciers > 1 km^{2} (0.386 sq mi or 247 acres) and river estuaries.

Saint-Denis-d'Authou (French pronunciation: [sɛ̃ dəni dotu]) is a former commune in the Eure-et-Loir department in northern France. On 1 January 2019, it was merged into the new commune Saintigny.

== See also ==
- Communes of the Eure-et-Loir department
