= Combres =

- Commune
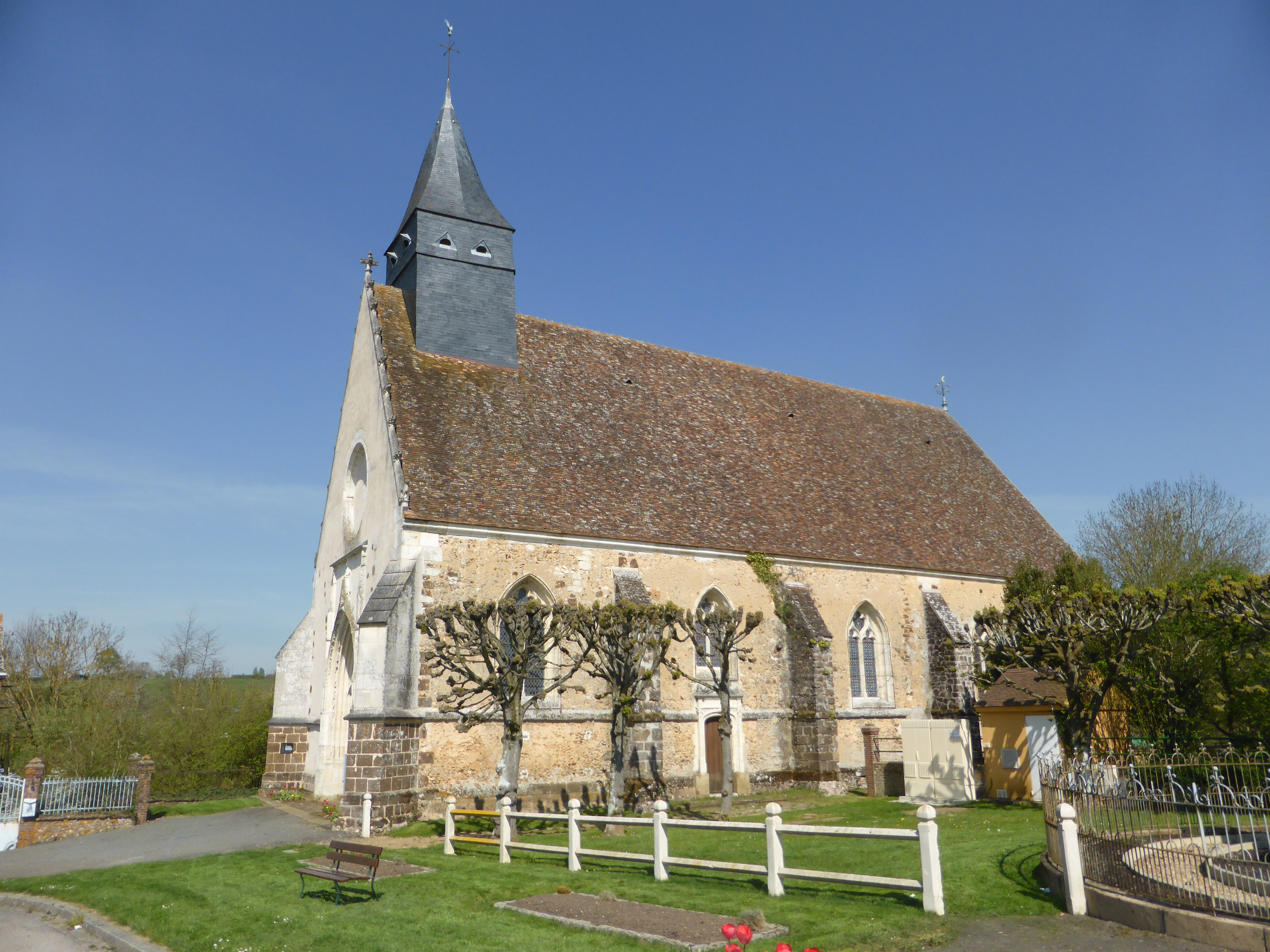
- The church in Combres
- Location of Combres
- Location within France Location within Centre-Val de Loire
- Coordinates: 48°19′32″N 1°03′54″E
- Country: France
- Region: Centre-Val de Loire
- Department: Eure-et-Loir
- Arrondissement: Nogent-le-Rotrou
- Canton: Nogent-le-Rotrou

Government
  - Mayor (2020–2026): René Rousselle
- Area^{1}: 14.9 km^{2} (5.8 sq mi)
- Elevation: 128 m (420 ft)
- Highest elevation: 266 m (873 ft)
- Lowest elevation: 203 m (666 ft)
- Population (2023): 547
  - Density: 36.7/km^{2} (95.1/sq mi)
- Time zone: UTC+01:00 (CET)
  - Summer (DST): UTC+02:00 (CEST)
- INSEE/Postal code: 28105 /28480
- ^{1} French Land Register data, which excludes lakes, ponds, glaciers > 1 km^{2} (0.386 sq mi or 247 acres) and river estuaries.

Combres (French pronunciation: [kɔ̃bʁ]) is a commune in the Eure-et-Loir department in northern France.

== Population ==
Historical population
Year	Pop.	±% p.a.
1968	432	—
1975	377	−1.93%
1982	321	−2.27%
1990	342	+0.80%
1999	368	+0.82%
2007	459	+2.80%
2012	536	+3.15%
2017	562	+0.95%
2023	547	−0.45%
Source: INSEE

== See also ==
- Communes of the Eure-et-Loir department
