= Chassant =

- Commune
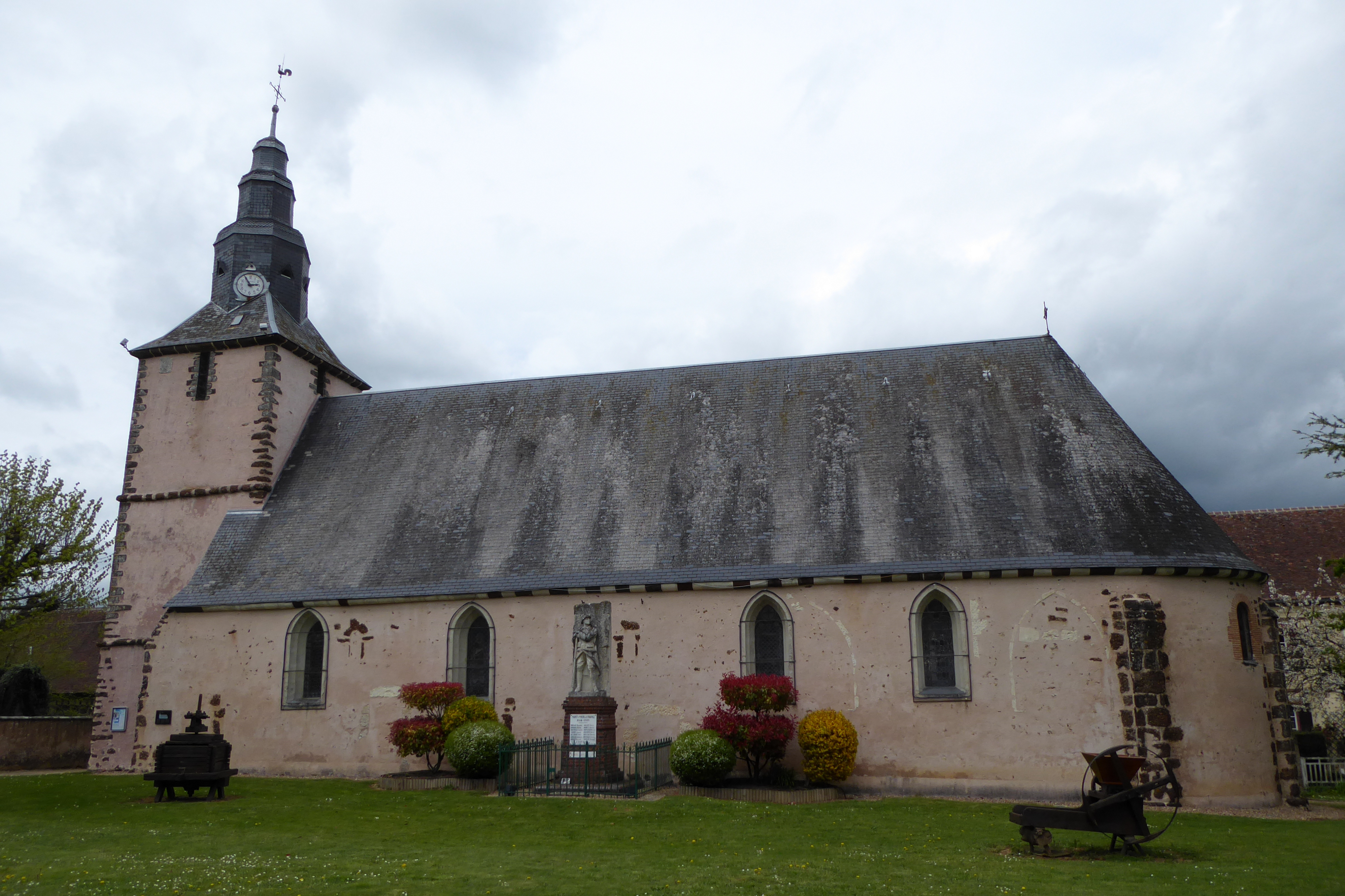
- The church in Chassant
- Location of Chassant
- Location within France Location within Centre-Val de Loire
- Coordinates: 48°17′43″N 1°03′47″E
- Country: France
- Region: Centre-Val de Loire
- Department: Eure-et-Loir
- Arrondissement: Nogent-le-Rotrou
- Canton: Nogent-le-Rotrou

Government
  - Mayor (2020–2026): Yves Ruel
- Area^{1}: 4.46 km^{2} (1.72 sq mi)
- Elevation: 224 m (735 ft)
- Highest elevation: 237 m (778 ft)
- Lowest elevation: 191 m (627 ft)
- Population (2023): 299
  - Density: 67.0/km^{2} (174/sq mi)
- Time zone: UTC+01:00 (CET)
  - Summer (DST): UTC+02:00 (CEST)
- INSEE/Postal code: 28086 /28480
- ^{1} French Land Register data, which excludes lakes, ponds, glaciers > 1 km^{2} (0.386 sq mi or 247 acres) and river estuaries.

Chassant (French pronunciation: [ʃasɑ̃]) is a commune in the Eure-et-Loir department in northern France.

== Population ==
Historical population
Year	Pop.	±% p.a.
1968	322	—
1975	308	−0.63%
1982	291	−0.81%
1990	305	+0.59%
1999	298	−0.26%
2007	319	+0.85%
2012	325	+0.37%
2017	329	+0.24%
2023	299	−1.58%
Source: INSEE

== See also ==
- Communes of the Eure-et-Loir department
