= Boissy =

Boissy is the name or part of the name of 18 communes of France:

- Boissy-aux-Cailles
- Boissy-en-Drouais
- Boissy-Fresnoy
- Boissy-l'Aillerie
- Boissy-la-Rivière
- Boissy-Lamberville
- Boissy-le-Bois
- Boissy-le-Châtel
- Boissy-le-Cutté
- Boissy-le-Repos
- Boissy-le-Sec
- Boissy-lès-Perche
- Boissy-Maugis
- Boissy-Mauvoisin
- Boissy-Saint-Léger
- Boissy-sans-Avoir in the Yvelines département
- Boissy-sous-Saint-Yon
- Roy-Boissy

== Surname ==
- Louis de Boissy (1694–1758), French poet and playwright
- Louis Michel de Boissy (1725–1793), son of the former, French historian
