= Battle of Bretoncelles =

- Part of Franco-Prussian War
Date	21 November 1870
Location	Bretoncelles, Orne, France
Result	German Victory

Belligerents
French Republic	North German Confederation: Prussia

Commanders and leaders
Unknown	Friedrich Franz II

Casualties and losses
250 Captured	Unknown

The Battle of Bretoncelles was an event in the Franco-Prussian War. It occurred on 21 November 1870, in Bretoncelles, Orne, France. This engagement ended with the defeat of the French army, when the Prussian army under the command of Friedrich Franz II, Grand Duke of Mecklenburg-Schwerin forced the French to retreat. The Battle of Bretoncelles was one of the most important battles in the advance of the Grand Duke of Mecklenburg in late 1870.

== The Battle ==
The Battle of Bretoncelles took place in a narrow gorge in the hills of a densely forested area. The French had placed their artillery groups, or batteries, in a position to quell the gorge's opening, and these opened fire on the leading German companies when they entered it. The Germans retaliated and brought their artillery groups in position. Soon the French batteries on the right-hand side of the valley were silenced and had to retreat to the opposite side, where the battle continued longer. The French later had to retreat to the fields adjacent to the gorge. There they hid in bushes and other hiding places and quickly shot at the German soldiers who were advancing across the open space, before retreating to their next vantage point. The battle continued, with French forces occasionally providing resistance in short bursts, but the Germans were not kept from advancing.

The main French army retreated in the direction of Nogent-le-Rotrou. However, for the next couple of hours, the victors continued to shell them. The German army took 250 French troops as prisoners, and within three days, this number grew to 600. Several French POWs were temporarily held in a church in Bretoncelles, some of them were very young. All of these prisoners were conscripts. Several other minor skirmishes also occurred during the campaigns of the Grand Duke of Mecklenburg-Schwerin, which all were won by the German army.
