= Préaux-du-Perche =

- Part of Perche en Nocé
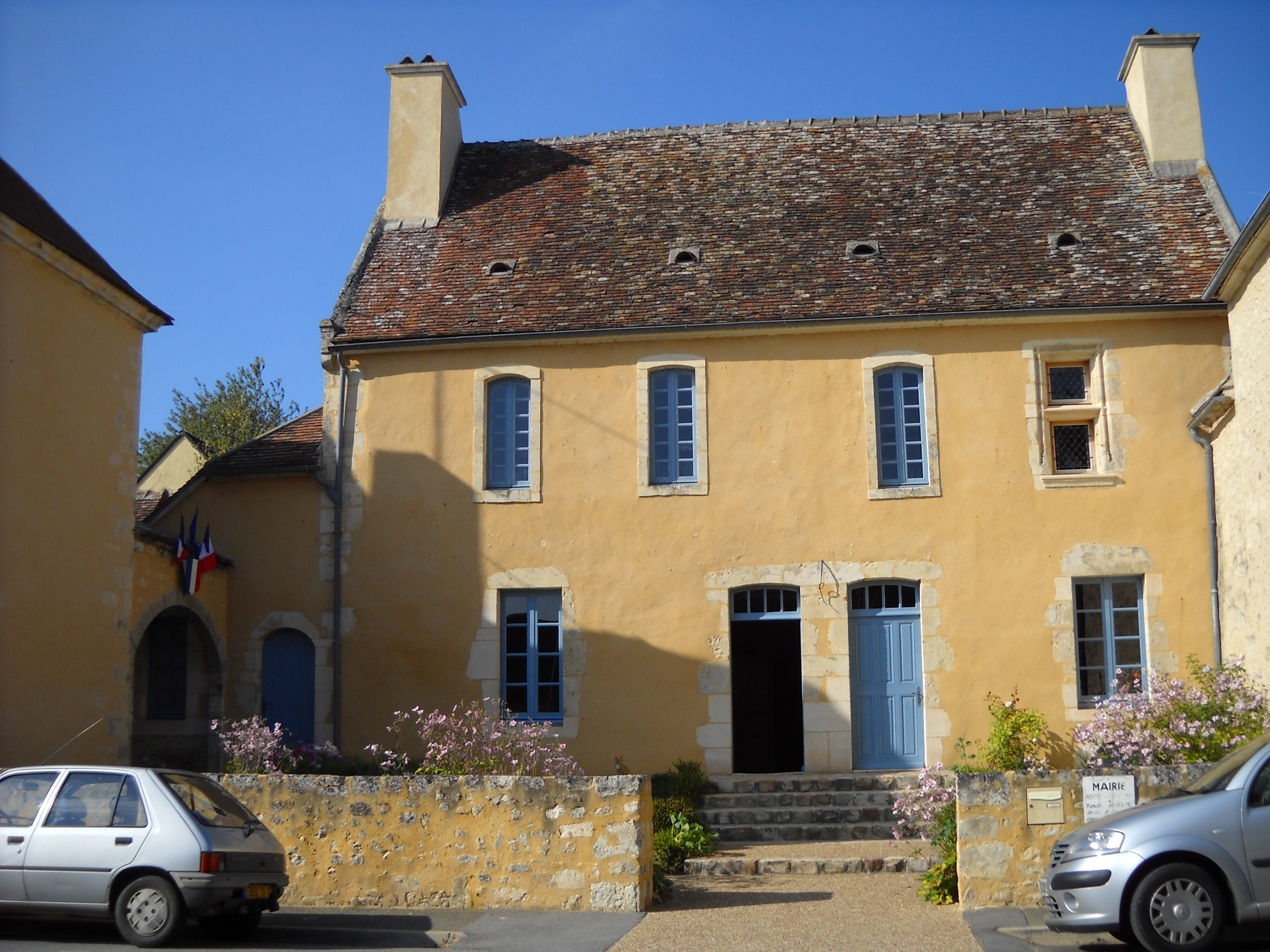
- Town hall
- Location of Préaux-du-Perche
- Location within France Location within Normandy
- Coordinates: 48°19′50″N 0°42′15″E
- Country: France
- Region: Normandy
- Department: Orne
- Arrondissement: Mortagne-au-Perche
- Canton: Bretoncelles
- Commune: Perche en Nocé
- Area^{1}: 23.52 km^{2} (9.08 sq mi)
- Elevation: 123 m (404 ft)
- Highest elevation: 196 m (643 ft)
- Lowest elevation: 109 m (358 ft)
- Population (2022): 508
  - Density: 21.6/km^{2} (55.9/sq mi)
- Time zone: UTC+01:00 (CET)
  - Summer (DST): UTC+02:00 (CEST)
- Postal code: 61340
- ^{1} French Land Register data, which excludes lakes, ponds, glaciers > 1 km^{2} (0.386 sq mi or 247 acres) and river estuaries.

Préaux-du-Perche (French pronunciation: [pʁeo dy pɛʁʃ]) is a former commune in the Orne department in north-western France. On 1 January 2016, it was merged into the new commune of Perche en Nocé.

== See also ==
- Communes of the Orne department
