= Rémalard =

Commune in Orne, France

- Part of Rémalard en Perche
- Location of Rémalard
- Location within France Location within Normandy
- Coordinates: 48°25′47″N 0°46′24″E
- Country: France
- Region: Normandy
- Department: Orne
- Arrondissement: Mortagne-au-Perche
- Canton: Bretoncelles
- Commune: Rémalard en Perche
- Area^{1}: 20.89 km^{2} (8.07 sq mi)
- Elevation: 143 m (469 ft)
- Highest elevation: 243 m (797 ft)
- Lowest elevation: 119 m (390 ft)
- Population (2013): 1,212
  - Density: 58.02/km^{2} (150.3/sq mi)
- Time zone: UTC+01:00 (CET)
  - Summer (DST): UTC+02:00 (CEST)
- Postal code: 61110
- ^{1} French Land Register data, which excludes lakes, ponds, glaciers > 1 km^{2} (0.386 sq mi or 247 acres) and river estuaries.

Rémalard (French pronunciation: [ʁemalaʁ]) is a former commune in the Orne department in north-western France. On 1 January 2016, it was merged into the new commune of Rémalard en Perche.

It is located close to the river Huisne, in the Perche regional park. It is surrounded by the cities of Alencon (60 km to the west), Dreux (65 km to the north east), Chartres (60 km to the east) and Le Mans (72 km to the south west).

== See also ==
- Communes of the Orne department
