= Maisonette =

Maisonette (also maisonnette) or Maisonettes may refer to:

- A type of apartment
- The Maisonette, a former restaurant in Cincinnati, Ohio, United States
- The Maisonettes, an English band
- Maisonnette, New Brunswick
- Pointe de Maisonnette (New Brunswick)
- Consolation-Maisonnettes, France

== See also ==
- Maison (disambiguation)
