= Nocé =

Commune in Orne, France

- Part of Perche en Nocé
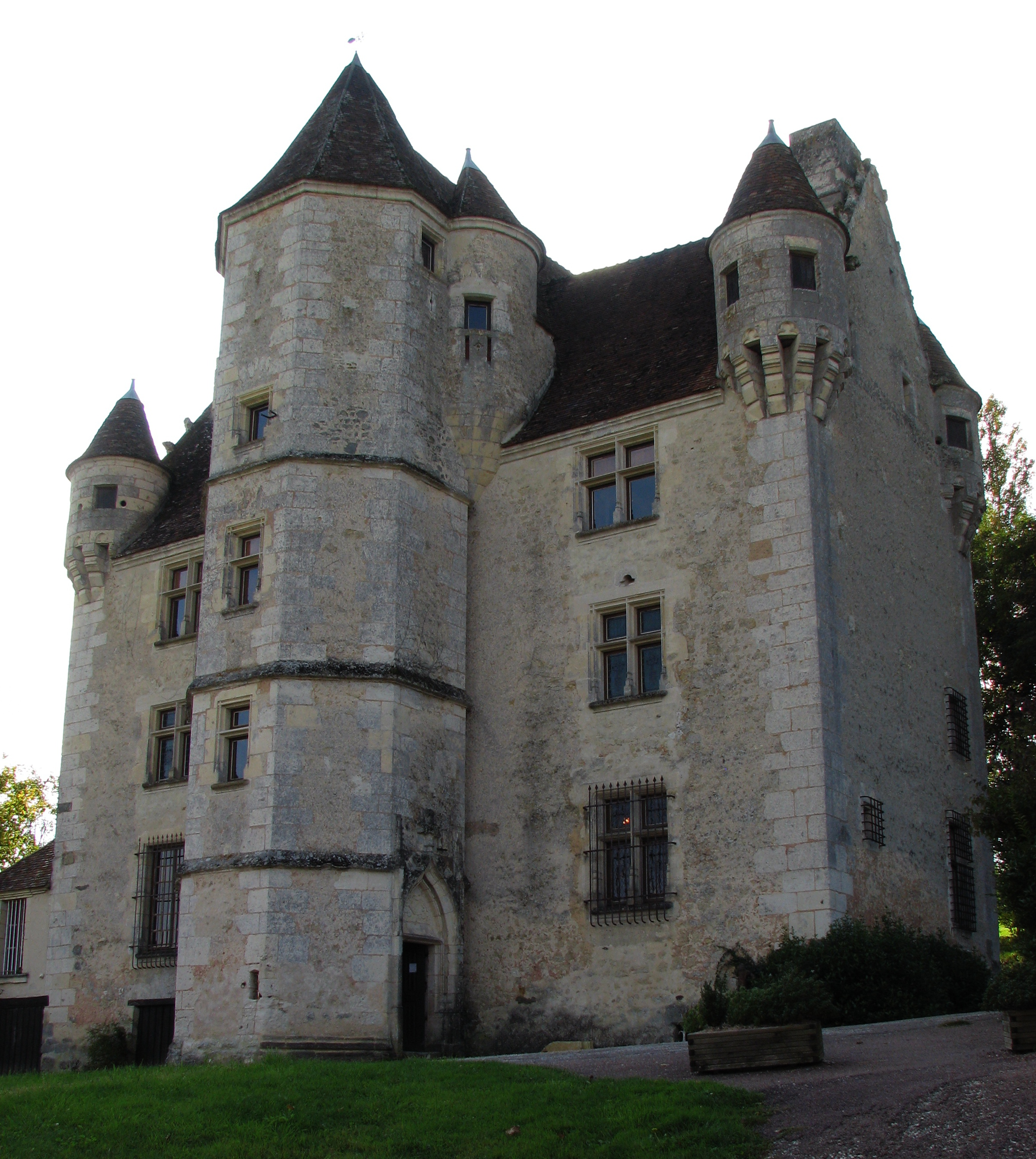
- Courboyer Manor, Nocé
- Location of Nocé
- Location within France Location within Normandy
- Coordinates: 48°22′48″N 0°40′56″E
- Country: France
- Region: Normandy
- Department: Orne
- Arrondissement: Mortagne-au-Perche
- Canton: Bretoncelles
- Commune: Perche en Nocé
- Area^{1}: 21.05 km^{2} (8.13 sq mi)
- Highest elevation: 234 m (768 ft)
- Lowest elevation: 127 m (417 ft)
- Population (2022): 691
  - Density: 32.8/km^{2} (85.0/sq mi)
- Demonym: Nocéens
- Time zone: UTC+01:00 (CET)
  - Summer (DST): UTC+02:00 (CEST)
- Postal code: 61340
- ^{1} French Land Register data, which excludes lakes, ponds, glaciers > 1 km^{2} (0.386 sq mi or 247 acres) and river estuaries.

Nocé (French pronunciation: [nɔse]) is a former commune in the Orne department in north-western France. On 1 January 2016, it was merged into the new commune of Perche en Nocé.

== Heraldry ==
Arms of Nocé	The arms of Nocé are blazoned : Or, a saltire gules between 4 lions sable.

== See also ==
- Communes of the Orne department
