= Saint-Jean-de-la-Forêt =

- Part of Perche en Nocé
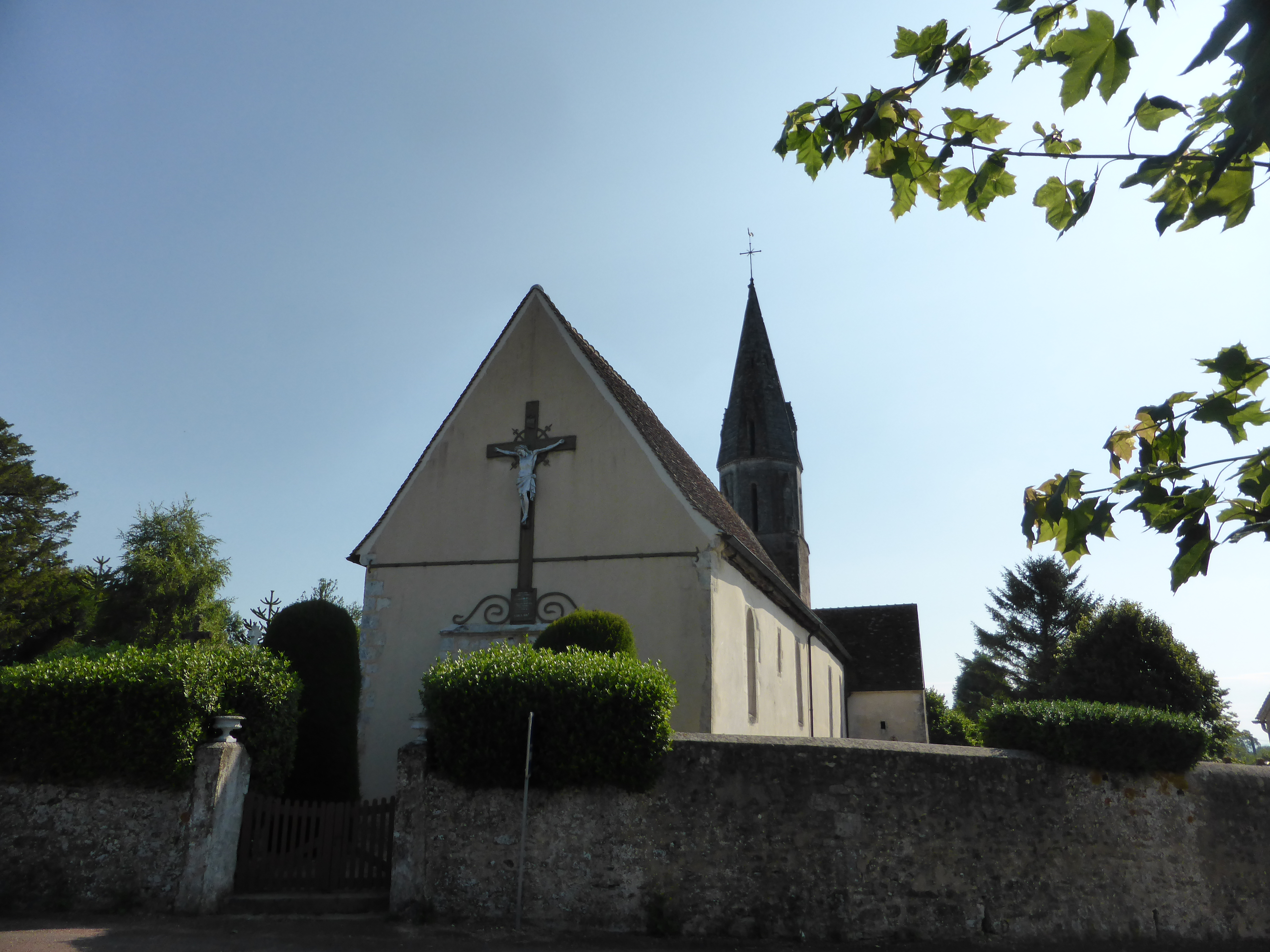
- Saint-Jean Church in Saint-Jean-de-la-Forêt
- Location of Saint-Jean-de-la-Forêt
- Location within France Location within Normandy
- Coordinates: 48°22′45″N 0°38′15″E
- Country: France
- Region: Normandy
- Department: Orne
- Arrondissement: Mortagne-au-Perche
- Canton: Bretoncelles
- Commune: Perche en Nocé
- Area^{1}: 9.37 km^{2} (3.62 sq mi)
- Elevation: 212 m (696 ft)
- Highest elevation: 252 m (827 ft)
- Lowest elevation: 154 m (505 ft)
- Population (2022): 160
  - Density: 17/km^{2} (44/sq mi)
- Time zone: UTC+01:00 (CET)
  - Summer (DST): UTC+02:00 (CEST)
- Postal code: 61340
- ^{1} French Land Register data, which excludes lakes, ponds, glaciers > 1 km^{2} (0.386 sq mi or 247 acres) and river estuaries.

Saint-Jean-de-la-Forêt (French pronunciation: [sɛ̃ ʒɑ̃ də la fɔʁɛ]) is a former commune in the Orne department in north-western France. On 1 January 2016, it was merged into the new commune of Perche en Nocé. Its population was 160 in 2022.

== See also ==
- Communes of the Orne department
