= Dancé =

Dancé may refer to the following places in France:

- Dancé, Loire, a commune in the Loire department
- Dancé, Orne, a commune in the Orne department

== See also ==
- Dance (disambiguation)
