= Courcerault =

- Part of Cour-Maugis sur Huisne
- Location of Courcerault
- Location within France Location within Normandy
- Coordinates: 48°26′20″N 0°39′33″E
- Country: France
- Region: Normandy
- Department: Orne
- Arrondissement: Mortagne-au-Perche
- Canton: Bretoncelles
- Commune: Cour-Maugis sur Huisne
- Area^{1}: 14.75 km^{2} (5.70 sq mi)
- Elevation: 149 m (489 ft)
- Highest elevation: 238 m (781 ft)
- Lowest elevation: 127 m (417 ft)
- Population (2013): 163
  - Density: 11.1/km^{2} (28.6/sq mi)
- Time zone: UTC+01:00 (CET)
  - Summer (DST): UTC+02:00 (CEST)
- Postal code: 61340
- ^{1} French Land Register data, which excludes lakes, ponds, glaciers > 1 km^{2} (0.386 sq mi or 247 acres) and river estuaries.

Courcerault (French pronunciation: [kuʁsəʁo]) is a former commune in the Orne department in north-western France. On 1 January 2016, it was merged into the new commune of Cour-Maugis sur Huisne.

== See also ==
- Communes of the Orne department
