= Bellou-sur-Huisne =

- Part of Rémalard en Perche
- Location of Bellou-sur-Huisne
- Location within France Location within Normandy
- Coordinates: 48°25′34″N 0°45′26″E
- Country: France
- Region: Normandy
- Department: Orne
- Arrondissement: Mortagne-au-Perche
- Canton: Bretoncelles
- Commune: Rémalard en Perche
- Area^{1}: 15.11 km^{2} (5.83 sq mi)
- Elevation: 124 m (407 ft)
- Highest elevation: 226 m (741 ft)
- Lowest elevation: 120 m (390 ft)
- Population (2013): 425
  - Density: 28.1/km^{2} (72.8/sq mi)
- Time zone: UTC+01:00 (CET)
  - Summer (DST): UTC+02:00 (CEST)
- Postal code: 61110
- ^{1} French Land Register data, which excludes lakes, ponds, glaciers > 1 km^{2} (0.386 sq mi or 247 acres) and river estuaries.

Bellou-sur-Huisne (French pronunciation: [bɛlu syʁ ɥin], literally Bellou on Huisne) is a former commune in the Orne department in northwestern France. On 1 January 2016, it was merged into the new commune of Rémalard en Perche.

== Population ==
Historical population
Year	Pop.	±% p.a.
1962	531	—
1968	522	−0.28%
1975	451	−2.07%
1982	418	−1.08%
1990	425	+0.21%
1999	453	+0.71%
2013	425	−0.45%
Source: EHESS and INSEE

== Saint Paterne church ==
The church at Bellou-sur-Huisne, as many religious buildings in the Perche, belongs to the Romanesque era. This cruciform church has a single nave. The base of the tower constitutes the North transept, while a chapel built in 1854, dedicated to the Virgin Mary, serves as South transept. The apse ends in a semicircle, while its base is made of stones of quite large size. The building must have had architectural interest. The main entrance was the North one. It is the most typical feature of the original church. In the 16th and 17th century, the church underwent alterations.

In 1875, the "Fabrique" (official organization of parishioners) and direct gifts from parishioners made it possible to start restoration work, and the sculptures representing various motifs taken from Christian symbolism date from that time. The most typical features are the 82 medallions which decorate the various sides of the building, representing the history of Christianity, the sins of men, redemption, the litanies of the Virgin Mary and the symbols of the Church.

The furniture of the church includes a collection of large, carved wooden pieces which reflect styles from the 17th and 18th centuries. These pieces include: a baroque altarpiece in painted stone with wings and six columns (18th century), an arched pediment with glory, garlands and baskets of flowers, decorated with two statues (Saint Martin and Saint Paterne) in carved and painted wood (17th century), a wooden tabernacle (18th century), a great crucifix in carved and painted wood (17th century), an 18th-century processional banner. All these are on the supplementary historical register. A beautiful set of 18th century benches is also worthy of notice.

One of the three bells (1896) was given to the parish by the empress of Russia. Her godfather was count Jules François de la Bonninière de Beaumont, and her godmother her majesty the dowager empress of Russia Maria Feodorovna, widow of Alexander III, and mother of the last Tsar, Nicolas II.

The windows represent the patron saints of the parish and the saints who lived in the Perche. The ones in the apsidal recesses are Saint Paterne, Saint Eloi and Saint Louis, the ones in the nave, Saint Latuin and Saint Laumer. The nave windows were designed and made in an Argentan workshop, by Ledien and Bazire (1858). Local popular fashion best enabled the stained glass artists to express their originality. In the absence of academic models, they had to create original art representing the specific cults of the Perche. Several of these windows have been on the register of the département since 1987. Next, transfer of the relics of Saint Latuin to Bellou S/Huisne.

Eighteenth century processional banner, restored in 2006-2007 (Oil on linen canvas, one side representing Saint Paterne, the other, the virgin enthroned.)

== Bellou-sur-Huisne Patrimoine association ==
The "Bellou-sur-Huisne Patrimoine" association was created in July 2005 in order to collect gifts from individuals and companies and help the village to preserve its cultural and historical heritage and more specifically, the church of Saint Paterne. Thanks to the gifts and to the "Fondation du Patrimoine" and the "Conseil Général de l'Orne", the tower and many works of art (The Stations of the Cross, the banner etc.) have already been restored. Many objects and pieces of furniture are still in need of renovation. Gifts to the association may be tax-deductible. For further information, contact :

== See also ==
- Communes of the Orne department
