= Saint-Maurice-sur-Huisne =

- Part of Cour-Maugis-sur-Huisne
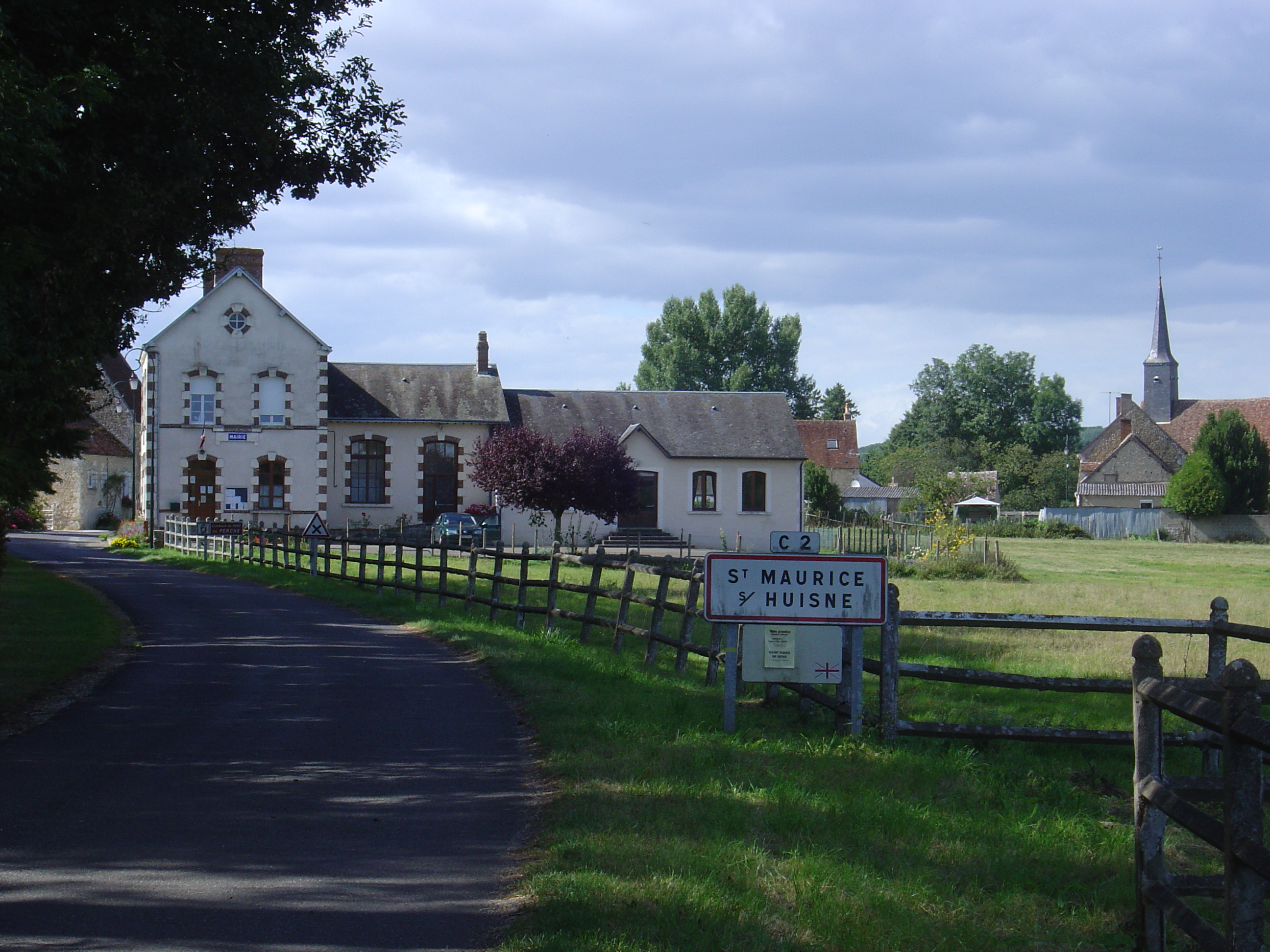
- Town hall
- Location of Saint-Maurice-sur-Huisne
- Location within France Location within Normandy
- Coordinates: 48°26′34″N 0°42′00″E
- Country: France
- Region: Normandy
- Department: Orne
- Arrondissement: Mortagne-au-Perche
- Canton: Bretoncelles
- Commune: Cour-Maugis-sur-Huisne
- Area^{1}: 4.42 km^{2} (1.71 sq mi)
- Elevation: 128 m (420 ft)
- Highest elevation: 233 m (764 ft)
- Lowest elevation: 127 m (417 ft)
- Population (2013): 71
  - Density: 16/km^{2} (42/sq mi)
- Time zone: UTC+01:00 (CET)
  - Summer (DST): UTC+02:00 (CEST)
- Postal code: 61110
- ^{1} French Land Register data, which excludes lakes, ponds, glaciers > 1 km^{2} (0.386 sq mi or 247 acres) and river estuaries.

Saint-Maurice-sur-Huisne (French pronunciation: [sɛ̃ mɔʁis syʁ ɥin]; literally "Saint-Maurice on Huisne") is a former commune in the Orne department in north-western France. On 1 January 2016, it was merged into the new commune of Cour-Maugis-sur-Huisne.

== See also ==
- Communes of the Orne department
