= Colonard-Corubert =

- Part of Perche en Nocé
- Location of Colonard-Corubert
- Location within France Location within Normandy
- Coordinates: 48°24′35″N 0°39′28″E
- Country: France
- Region: Normandy
- Department: Orne
- Arrondissement: Mortagne-au-Perche
- Canton: Bretoncelles
- Commune: Perche en Nocé
- Area^{1}: 14.10 km^{2} (5.44 sq mi)
- Elevation: 238 m (781 ft)
- Highest elevation: 261 m (856 ft)
- Lowest elevation: 142 m (466 ft)
- Population (2022): 234
  - Density: 16.6/km^{2} (43.0/sq mi)
- Time zone: UTC+01:00 (CET)
  - Summer (DST): UTC+02:00 (CEST)
- Postal code: 61340
- ^{1} French Land Register data, which excludes lakes, ponds, glaciers > 1 km^{2} (0.386 sq mi or 247 acres) and river estuaries.

Colonard-Corubert (French pronunciation: [kɔlɔnaʁ kɔʁybɛʁ]) is a former commune in the Orne department in north-western France. On 1 January 2016, it was merged into the new commune of Perche en Nocé.

== See also ==
- Communes of the Orne department
