= Dorceau =

- Part of Rémalard en Perche
- Location of Dorceau
- Location within France Location within Normandy
- Coordinates: 48°25′25″N 0°48′06″E
- Country: France
- Region: Normandy
- Department: Orne
- Arrondissement: Mortagne-au-Perche
- Canton: Bretoncelles
- Commune: Rémalard en Perche
- Area^{1}: 14.68 km^{2} (5.67 sq mi)
- Elevation: 145 m (476 ft)
- Highest elevation: 230 m (750 ft)
- Lowest elevation: 115 m (377 ft)
- Population (2013): 386
  - Density: 26.3/km^{2} (68.1/sq mi)
- Time zone: UTC+01:00 (CET)
  - Summer (DST): UTC+02:00 (CEST)
- Postal code: 61110
- ^{1} French Land Register data, which excludes lakes, ponds, glaciers > 1 km^{2} (0.386 sq mi or 247 acres) and river estuaries.

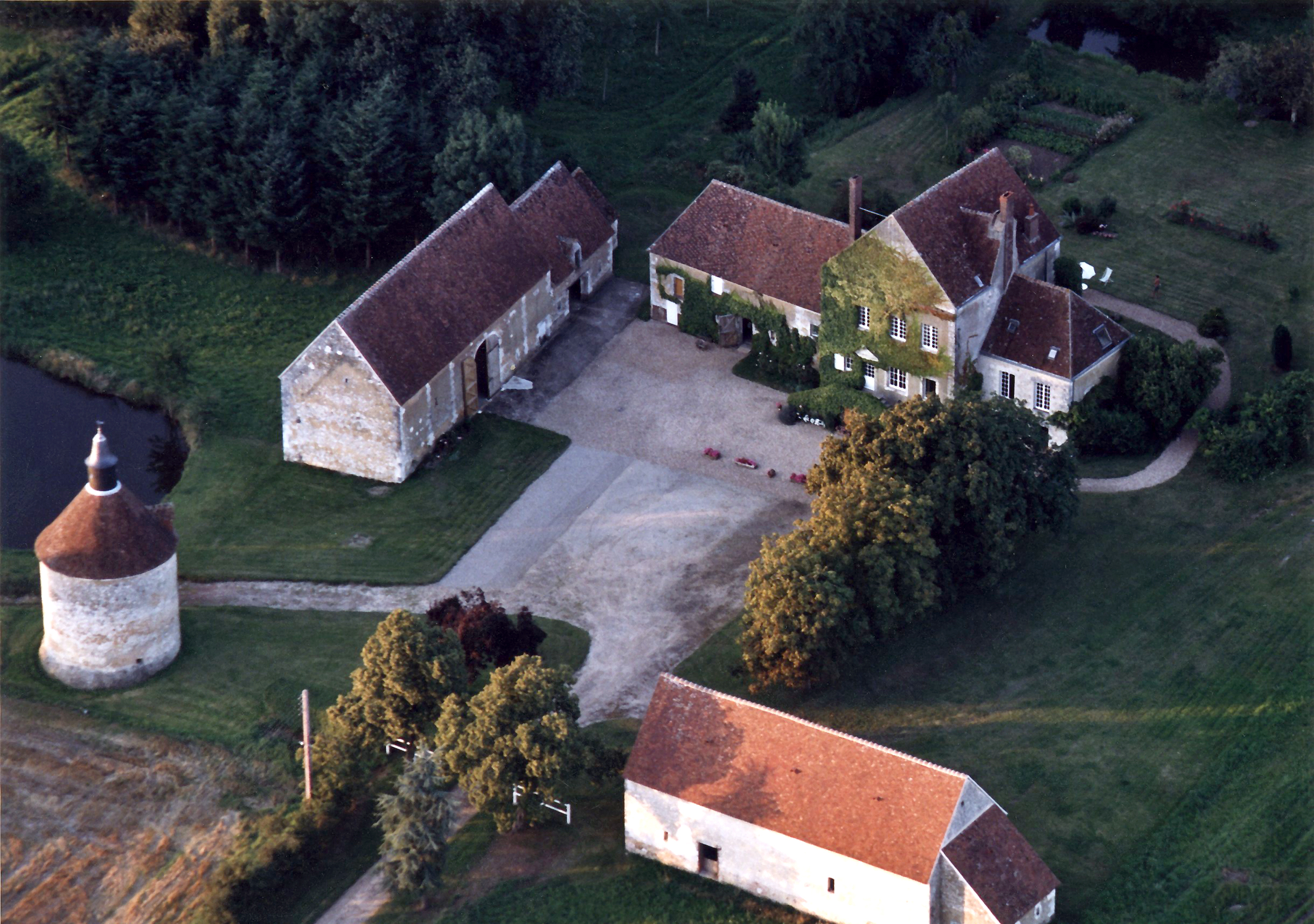
Traditional farm in Dorceau, France

Dorceau (French pronunciation: [dɔʁso]) is a former commune in the Orne department in north-western France. On 1 January 2016, it was merged into the new commune of Rémalard en Perche.

The river Huisne runs alongside the town.

Joseph Aveline was mayor of Dorceau from 1908 until his death in 1958.

== See also ==
- Communes of the Orne department
- Joseph Aveline
