= Saint-Aubin-des-Grois =

- Part of Perche en Nocé
- Location of Saint-Aubin-des-Grois
- Location within France Location within Normandy
- Coordinates: 48°21′21″N 0°38′41″E
- Country: France
- Region: Normandy
- Department: Orne
- Arrondissement: Mortagne-au-Perche
- Canton: Bretoncelles
- Commune: Perche en Nocé
- Area^{1}: 3.98 km^{2} (1.54 sq mi)
- Elevation: 151 m (495 ft)
- Highest elevation: 197 m (646 ft)
- Lowest elevation: 130 m (430 ft)
- Population (2022): 45
  - Density: 11/km^{2} (29/sq mi)
- Time zone: UTC+01:00 (CET)
  - Summer (DST): UTC+02:00 (CEST)
- Postal code: 61340
- ^{1} French Land Register data, which excludes lakes, ponds, glaciers > 1 km^{2} (0.386 sq mi or 247 acres) and river estuaries.

Saint-Aubin-des-Grois (French pronunciation: [sɛ̃.t‿obɛ̃ de ɡʁwa]) is a former commune in the Orne department in north-western France. On 1 January 2016, it was merged into the new commune of Perche en Nocé.

== See also ==
- Communes of the Orne department
