= Perche en Nocé =

- Commune
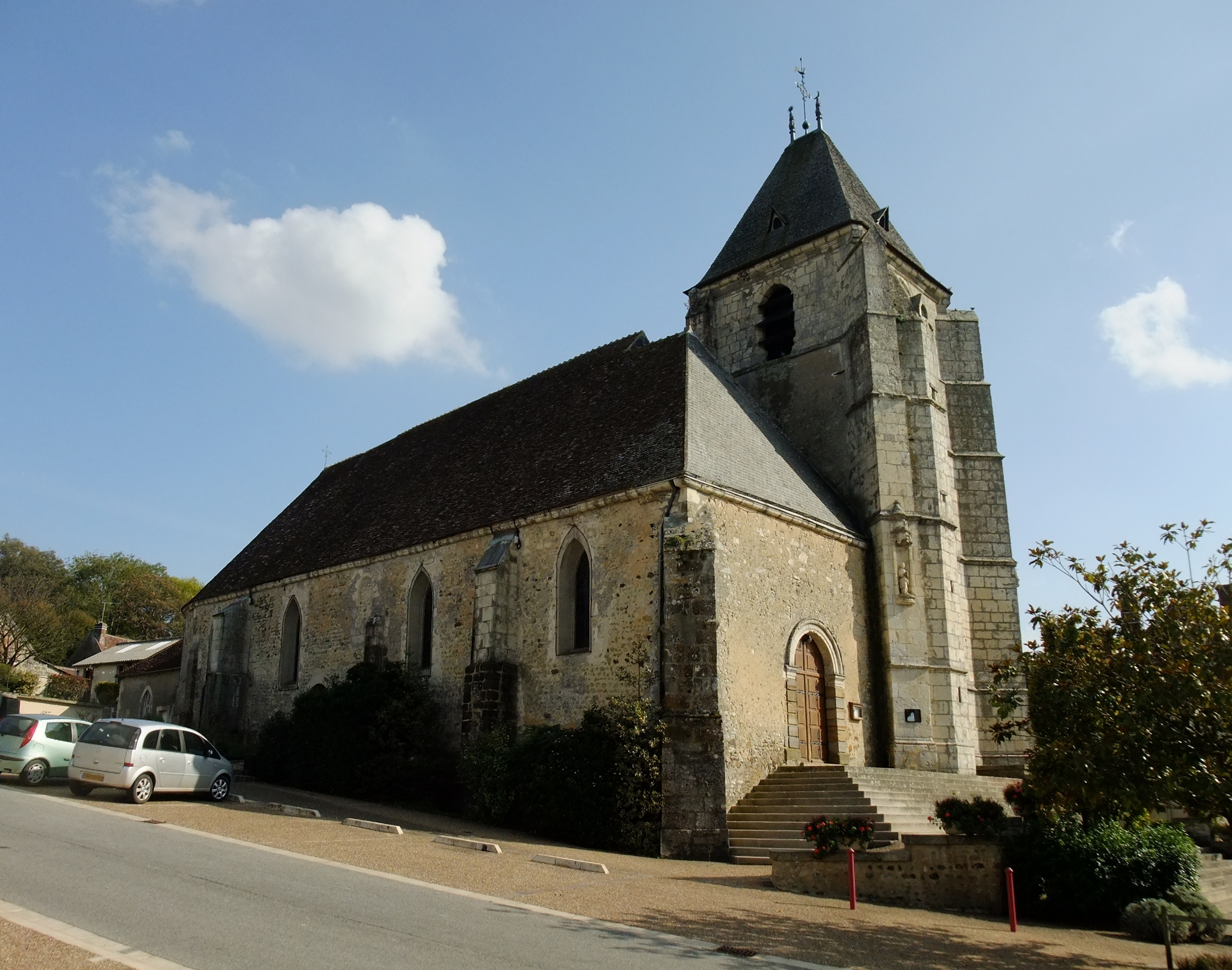
- The church in Nocé
- Location of Perche en Nocé
- Location within France Location within Normandy
- Coordinates: 48°22′48″N 0°40′52″E
- Country: France
- Region: Normandy
- Department: Orne
- Arrondissement: Mortagne-au-Perche
- Canton: Bretoncelles
- Intercommunality: Cœur du Perche

Government
  - Mayor (2020–2026): Pascal Pecchioli
- Area^{1}: 86.63 km^{2} (33.45 sq mi)
- Population (2023): 1,956
  - Density: 22.58/km^{2} (58.48/sq mi)
- Time zone: UTC+01:00 (CET)
  - Summer (DST): UTC+02:00 (CEST)
- INSEE/Postal code: 61309 /61340
- ^{1} French Land Register data, which excludes lakes, ponds, glaciers > 1 km^{2} (0.386 sq mi or 247 acres) and river estuaries.

Perche en Nocé (French pronunciation: [pɛʁʃ ɑ̃ nose]) is a commune in the department of Orne, northwestern France. The municipality was established on 1 January 2016 by merger of the former communes of Colonard-Corubert, Dancé, Nocé (the seat), Préaux-du-Perche, Saint-Aubin-des-Grois, and Saint-Jean-de-la-Forêt.

== Geography ==
The commune is made up of the following collection of villages and hamlets, L'Ormoie, Colonard-Corubert, Perche en Nocé, Dancé and La Galaisière.

The Commune along with another 70 communes shares part of a 47,681 hectare, Natura 2000 conservation area, called the Forêts et étangs du Perche.

six water courses, La Chèvre, L'Erre, La Rougette, La Rozière, Ruisseau de l'étang cochard and the Ruisseau du pont aux ânes run through the commune.

== Population ==
Population data refer to the area corresponding with the commune as of January 2025.

Historical population
Year	Pop.	±% p.a.
1968	2,279	—
1975	1,946	−2.23%
1982	1,848	−0.74%
1990	1,997	+0.97%
1999	2,122	+0.68%
2007	2,155	+0.19%
2012	2,176	+0.19%
2017	2,066	−1.03%
2023	1,956	−0.91%
Source: INSEE

== Notable buildings and places ==
The Jardin François is a 2 hectares (4.9 acres) garden, based in Préaux-du-Perche that began life in 1995 and is open to the public. It is classified as a Jardins remarquables by the Ministry of Culture and the Comité des Parcs et Jardins de France.

=== National heritage sites ===
The Commune has 10 buildings and areas listed as a Monument historique.

- Old Church of Courthioust a tenth Century church in the hamlet of Courthioust in Colonard-Corubert.
- Manor of Courboyer a fifteenth Century manor house in Nocé.
- Saint-Martin church a twelfth Century church in Nocé.
- Manor of Tarainière a fifteenth Century manor house in Préaux-du-Perche.
- Saint-Germain church a thirteenth Century church in Préaux-du-Perche.
- Manor of Lormarin a fifteenth Century manor in Nocé.
- Manor of Plessis a sixteenth Century manor house in Dance.
- Manor of Barville a seventeenth Century manor house in Noce.
- Lubinière Manor a fifteenth Century manor house in Préaux-du-Perche.
- Church in Dancé an eleventh Century church in Dancé.

== Notable people ==
- Léopold Nègre (1879 – 1961) a French physician and biologist who is buried here in Nocé.

== See also ==
- Communes of the Orne department
