= Berd'huis =

- Commune
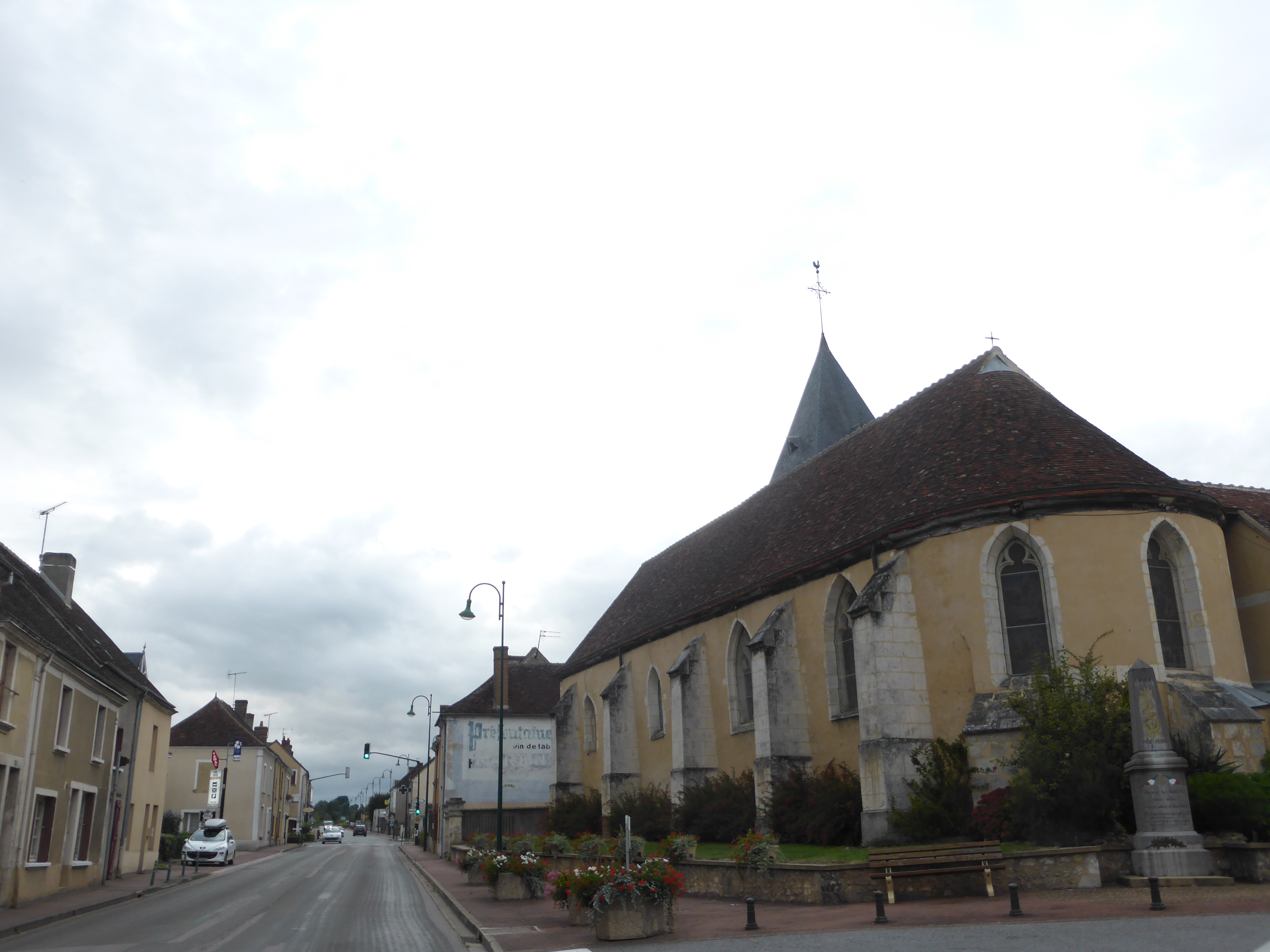
- The church in Berd'huis
- Location of Berd'huis
- Location within France Location within Normandy
- Coordinates: 48°20′46″N 0°44′48″E
- Country: France
- Region: Normandy
- Department: Orne
- Arrondissement: Mortagne-au-Perche
- Canton: Bretoncelles

Government
  - Mayor (2020–2026): Brigitte Luypaert
- Area^{1}: 11.45 km^{2} (4.42 sq mi)
- Elevation: 125 m (410 ft)
- Highest elevation: 192 m (630 ft)
- Lowest elevation: 107 m (351 ft)
- Population (2023): 1,097
  - Density: 95.81/km^{2} (248.1/sq mi)
- Time zone: UTC+01:00 (CET)
  - Summer (DST): UTC+02:00 (CEST)
- INSEE/Postal code: 61043 /61340
- ^{1} French Land Register data, which excludes lakes, ponds, glaciers > 1 km^{2} (0.386 sq mi or 247 acres) and river estuaries.

Berd'huis (French pronunciation: [bɛʁdɥi]) is a commune in the Orne department in northwestern France.

== Geography ==
The commune is made up of the following collection of villages and hamlets, Saint-Quentin, Le Tertre, Le Hameau, Les Villeries, Dordoigne, Les Arpents, La Machoisnerie, Les Quatre Minières, La Roussetière, Berd'huis, Beauvais, La Noé, Livraise and Les Vianderies.

A river, La Chèvre, runs through the commune.

== Population ==
Historical population
Year	Pop.	±% p.a.
1968	512	—
1975	564	+1.39%
1982	836	+5.78%
1990	1,003	+2.30%
1999	1,099	+1.02%
2007	1,073	−0.30%
2012	1,068	−0.09%
2017	1,111	+0.79%
2023	1,097	−0.21%
Source: INSEE

== Notable buildings and places ==
=== National heritage sites ===
- Grand-Saint-Quentin Manor is a 16th century manor house declared as a Monument historique in 1974.

== See also ==
- Communes of the Orne department
