= Saint-Pierre-la-Bruyère =

- Commune
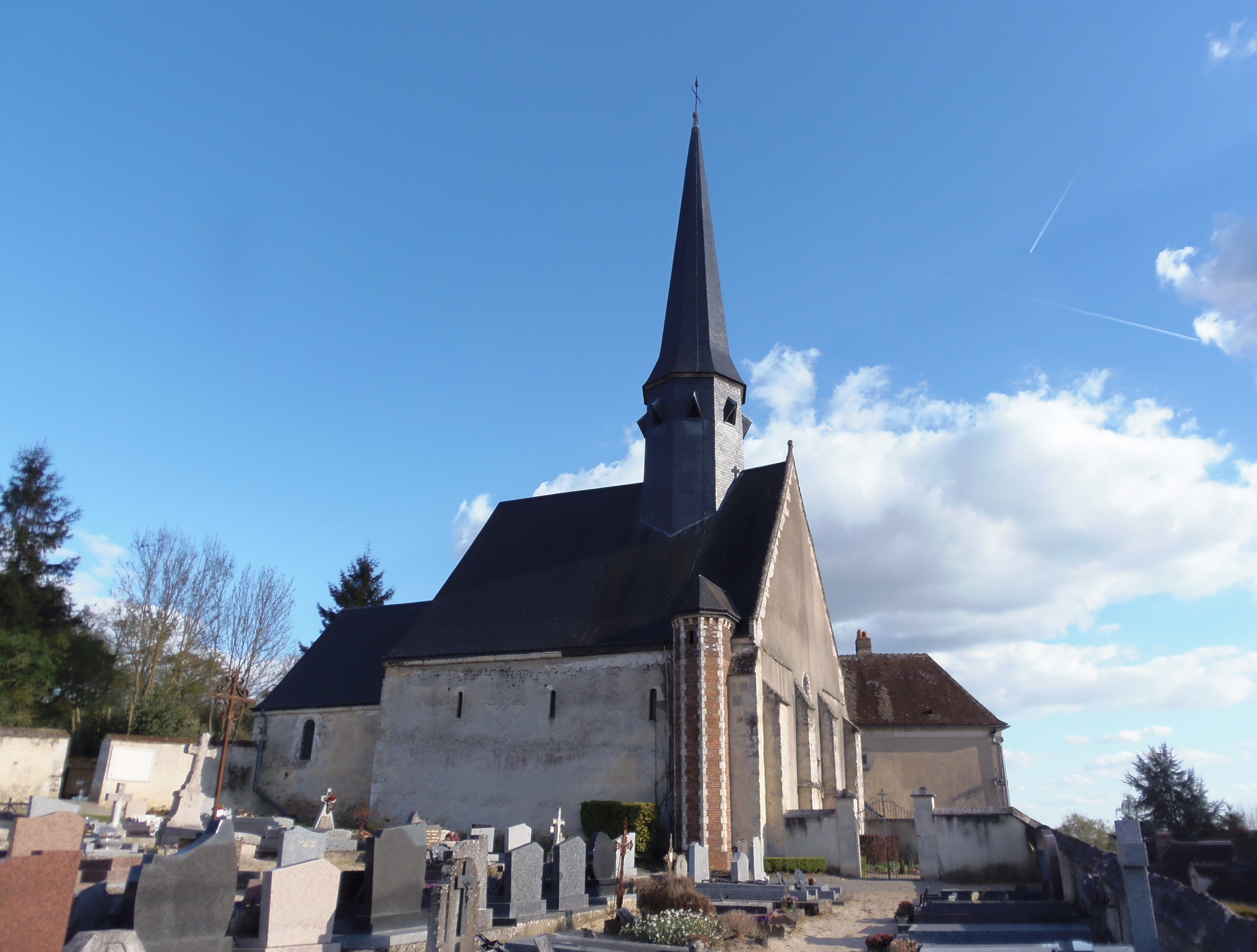
- The church in Saint-Pierre-la-Bruyère
- Location of Saint-Pierre-la-Bruyère
- Location within France Location within Normandy
- Coordinates: 48°21′47″N 0°48′21″E
- Country: France
- Region: Normandy
- Department: Orne
- Arrondissement: Mortagne-au-Perche
- Canton: Bretoncelles

Government
  - Mayor (2021–2026): Bruno Goupy
- Area^{1}: 6.33 km^{2} (2.44 sq mi)
- Elevation: 115 m (377 ft)
- Highest elevation: 216 m (709 ft)
- Lowest elevation: 130 m (430 ft)
- Population (2023): 423
  - Density: 66.8/km^{2} (173/sq mi)
- Time zone: UTC+01:00 (CET)
  - Summer (DST): UTC+02:00 (CEST)
- INSEE/Postal code: 61448 /61340
- ^{1} French Land Register data, which excludes lakes, ponds, glaciers > 1 km^{2} (0.386 sq mi or 247 acres) and river estuaries.

Saint-Pierre-la-Bruyère (French pronunciation: [sɛ̃ pjɛʁ la bʁɥijɛʁ]) is a commune in the Orne department in north-western France.

== See also ==
- Communes of the Orne department
