= Maison =

Maison (French for "house") may refer to:

== People ==
- Edna Maison (1892–1946), American silent-film actress
- Jérémy Maison (born 1993), French cyclist
- Leonard Maison, New York state senator 1834–1837
- Nicolas Joseph Maison (1771–1840), Marshal of France and Minister of War
- René Maison (1895–1962), Belgian operatic tenor
- Rudolf Maison (1854–1904), German sculptor

== Places in France ==
- Maison-des-Champs, a commune in the Aube department, Grand Est
- Maison-Feyne, a commune in the Creuse department, Nouvelle-Aquitaine
- Maison-Maugis, a former commune in the Orne department, Normandy
- Maison-Ponthieu, a commune in the Somme department, Hauts-de-France
- Maison-Roland, a commune in the Somme department, Hauts-de-France
- Maison-Rouge, a commune in the Seine-et-Marne department, Île-de-France

== Music ==
=== Songs ===
- "Maison", by Dreamcatcher from Apocalypse: Save Us

== See also ==
- Valérie Grand'Maison (born 1988), Canadian Paralympic swimmer
- Zoé De Grand Maison (born 1995), Canadian actress
- Maisons (disambiguation)
- Mason (disambiguation)
