= Joseph Aveline =

French parliamentary deputy, mayor of Dorceau, agriculturalist

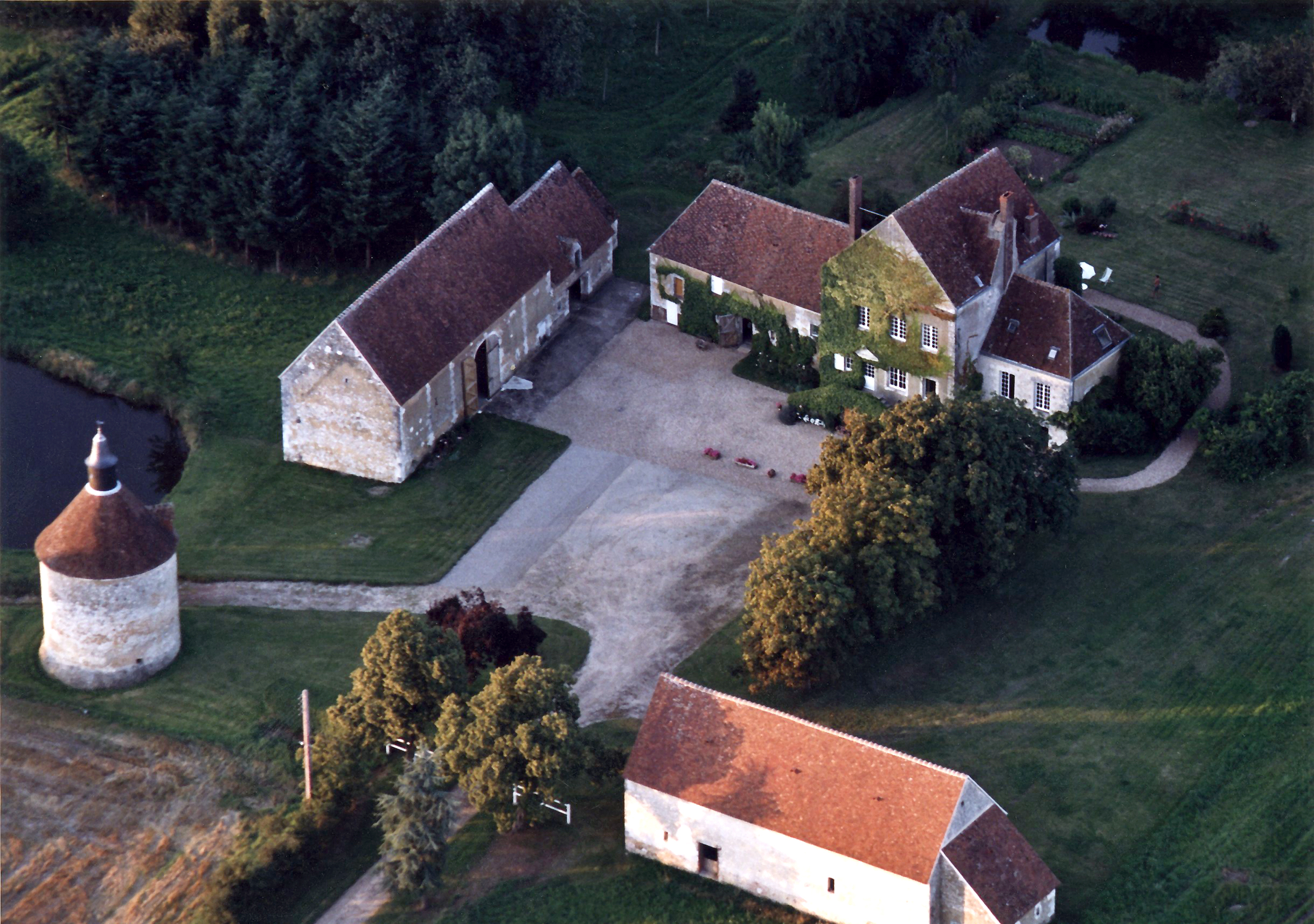
- Traditional farm in Dorceau, Aveline's birthplace
- Born: Joseph Louis Aveline; December 10, 1881; Dorceau, Orne, France
- Died: December 12, 1958 (aged 77); Dorceau, Orne, France
- Organization: XVI-th Legislature of Third French Republic
- Notable work: opposed Philippe Pétain; legislated for agriculture
- Awards: Commander of the Legion of Honor

Joseph Aveline (December 10, 1881, Dorceau, Orne, France – December 12, 1958, Dorceau, Orne, France) was a 20th-century French politician and agricultural expert from the Orne department of France, who served as mayor of Dorceau for a half century and, as parliamentary deputy, opposed full powers to Marshall Philippe Pétain in July 1940.

== Background ==
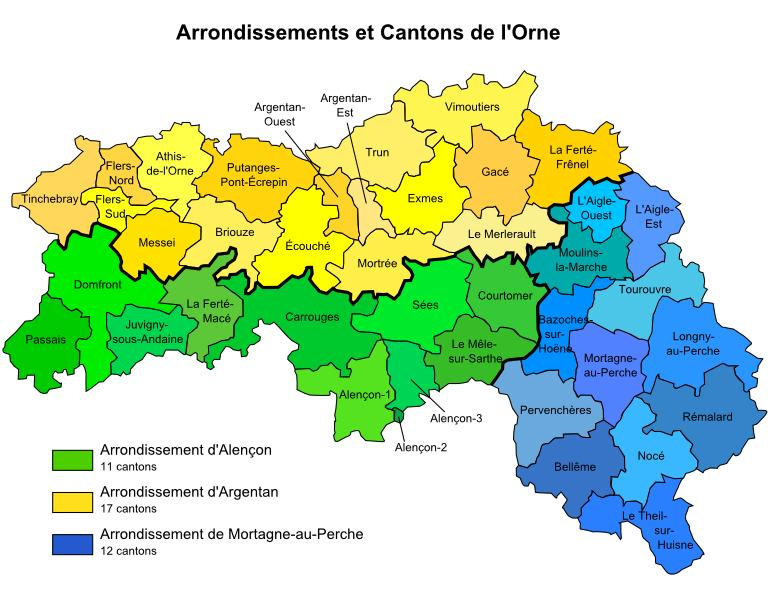
Orne's arrondissements and their cantons.

Joseph Louis Aveline was born on December 10, 1881, on a cattle-breeding farm in Dorceau (now part of the Rémalard-en-Perche commune) in Orne, France. His parents were Louis Joseph Aveline and Cécile Aline Poussin. His father had started the "New Farm" (French le Ferme-Neuve) there to breed Percheron horses and cattle of Normandy. He kept 40 Percheron horses, which he exported worldwide.

== Career ==
Aveline spent his life as both politician and champion of Norman animal husbandry.

=== Ferme-Neuve ===
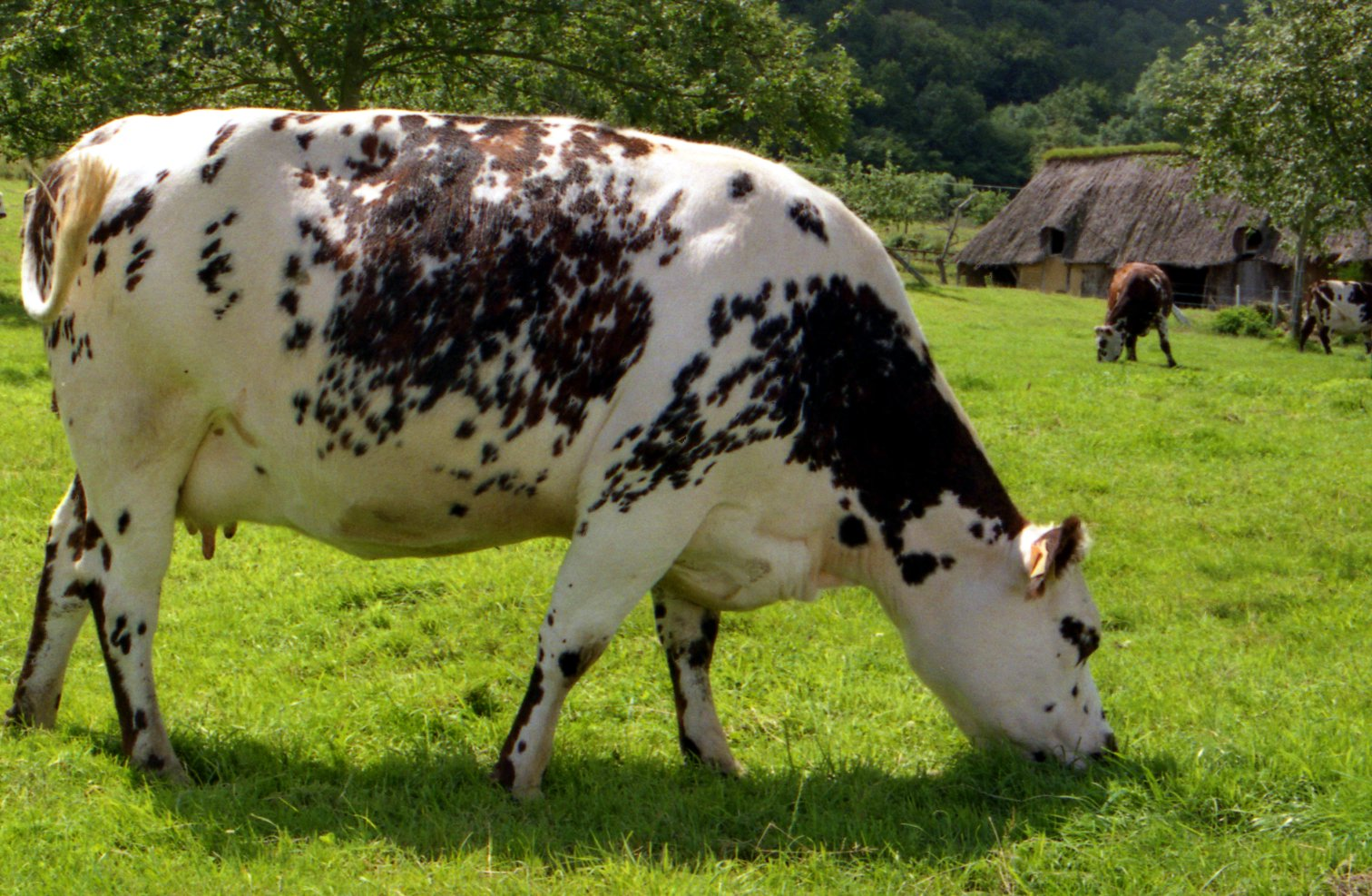
Aveline bred Normande dairy cattle bulls at La Ferme Neuve

In 1851, Aveline's father built la Ferme-Neuve ("the New Farm") into a closed-court estate at a former farm. In 1908, Aveline encircled with ten redwood (sequoia) as natural protection. (He had brought the trees back from a trip to Illinois in 1902.) The farm was famed for breeding Percheron horses and Normande dairy cattle bulls.

=== World War I ===
In 1914, Aveline began serving for France in World War I through the war's end in 1918, for which he received the Croix de Guerre. After demobilization, he took over management of the farm.

=== Horse breeder ===
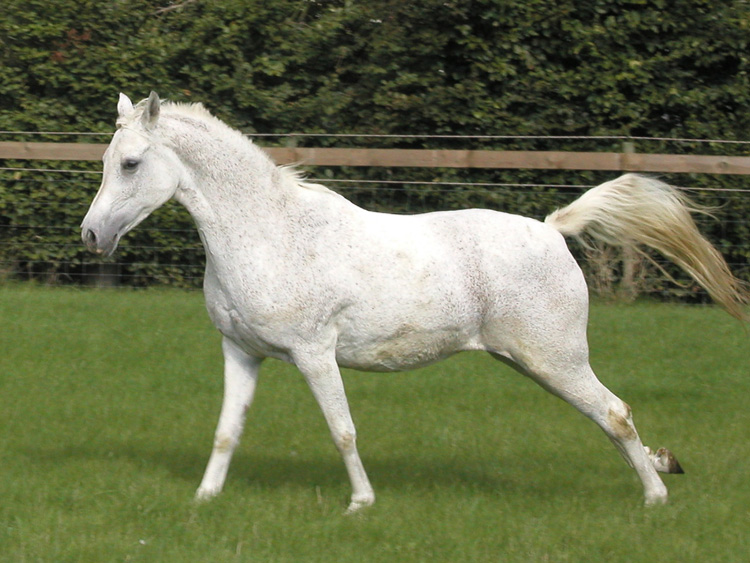
Aveline bred Percheron horses, which comes from his home Orne department

The Aveline family had already been breeding Percheron in the early 1800s:

We find the name of Aveline for the first time in 1823 at Mont Gaudray. He had a brown-bay mare...
M. Cousin, commune of Peray, had a dapple-gray stallion, born 1827, slightly under 16 hands, which served 40 mares in 1832, 43 mares in 1833, and 42 in 1834. We find the names of Avelines and Hamelin among the owners of mares served by this horse...

His relative, Charles Paul Aveline (1853-1917) received a short biographical entry in the 1917 book A History of the Percheron Horse: of particular note was M. Charles Aveline' brown Percheron named "Dragon." In 1889, there is mention that Percheron "Gris-Blue 9477" was appartenant à M. Joseph Aveline ("owned by Mr. Joseph Aveline"). In 1917, a photo of his farm in Dorceau appears in A History of Percheron Horses.

Joseph Aveline helped spearhead agriculture in Normandy. He led farmers in farming co-ops and trade unionism. He served as president of the regional bank for agricultural credit, president of the Orne Chamber of Agriculture, and vice-president of the Normandy Chamber of Agriculture.

Due to technical prowess, he also became president of the Percheron Horse Racing Society of France; member of the Higher Council of Agriculture, the Advisory Committee on Livestock, the Higher Stud Council, the Higher Council on Agronomic Research; president of the Federation of Genealogical Books, and foreign trade advisor.

Aveline won numerous breeding competitions. He also headed a large stud farm and became a horse specialist who, later in life, went on lecture tours, particularly in South America. The Harness racing horse track of Vincennes has a race and prize in his name.

=== Politician ===
Soon after the historic vote of July 1940, from which Aveline abstained, France came under German occupation (southern zone, starting November 1942) (yellow zone under Italian administration)

In 1908, at age 27, Aveline was elected mayor of Dorceau–an office he would hold for the next 50 years.

He served on the Council of the Department of Orne. In 1930, he became an Advocat général.

Aveline joined the Independent Radicals (French: Radicaux indépendants), a center-right French political group during the French Third Republic: it refused alliance of the "Parti républicain, radical et radical-socialiste" with the Left. (The Independent Radicals formed in 1926 after the fall of the first Cartel des gauches.)

On April 26, 1936, Aveline first ran for the Chamber of Deputies in Mortagne-au-Perche for Orne. On May 3, 1936, he won his seat (9,927 of 17,640 votes) as deputy from Orne in the Chamber of Deputies in the XVI-th Legislature of the Third Republic; its president was Léon Blum. A decree in July 1939 extended the service of deputies from May 1936 until May 1942. He served on the Committee on Agriculture and also the National Agricultural Credit Fund. In July 1940, with Paul Reynaud as president, he abstained from the vote for full powers to Marshal Philippe Pétain (who became the head of Vichy France).

(After being appointed Premier by President Albert Lebrun, Marshal Pétain's cabinet agreed to end the war and signed an Armistice with Germany on 22 June 1940. Pétain subsequently established an authoritarian regime when the National Assembly of the French Third Republic granted him full powers on 10 July 1940. At that point, the Third Republic was dissolved.)

=== Later life ===
After World War II, Aveline continued as mayor, advised agricultural organizations and government ministries (particularly the Ministry of Agriculture), and participated in a French trade mission to South America.

== Personal life and death ==
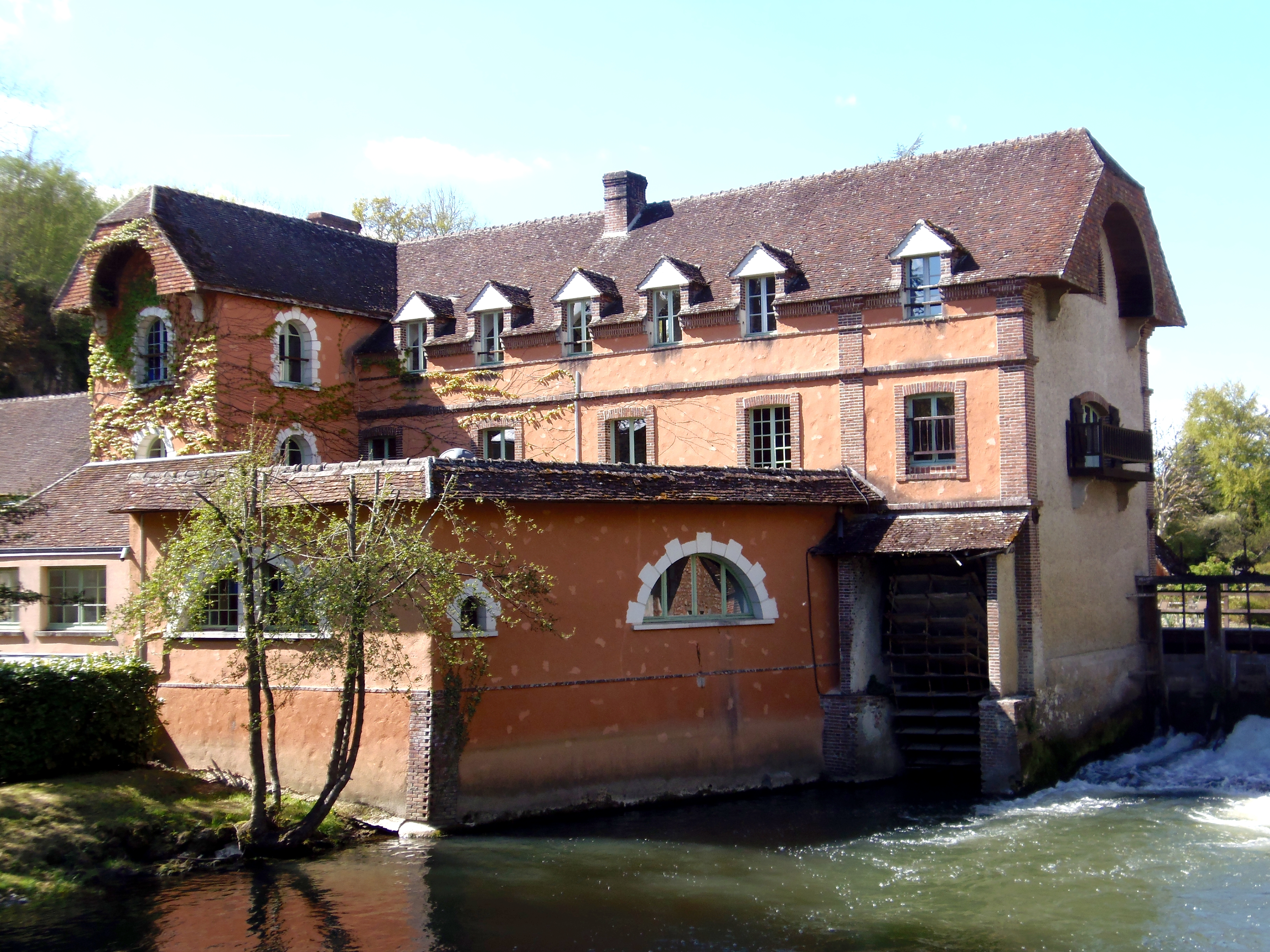
Mill on the Huisne just south of Dorceau

On April 28, 1903, Aveline married Berthe Marie Tuffier of Nogent-le-Rotrou.

His son Pierre took over the farm's management.

Joseph Aveline died age 77 on December 12, 1958, in Dorceau.

(Aveline may descend from a namesake Joseph Aveline (1638-1690), engraver of Paris.)

== Legislation ==
Aveline led the following legislation:

- 1939: Law on trade in products for animals law bears his name)

He supported the following legislation:

- 1936: Creation of a professional wheat board
- 1937: Finance Act of 1937, Customs Tariffs
- 1938: Veterinary medicine
- 1939: Finance Act of 1939
- 1940: Civil Service Budget for 1940, Rural Leases

He led legislative efforts for:

- 1937: Proposals on fertilizer - 1937, distribution of sums in urban mutual betting
- 1939: Resolution on rural leases and greyhounds (racing)

== Legacy, awards, recognition ==
In 2018, the current mayor of Rémalard-en-Perche dedicated the "Joseph Aveline Hall" in the renovated mairie (town hall) of Dorceau, noting la carrière exceptionnelle de celui qui au cours un demi-siècle était le premier magistrat de sa commune ("outstanding career of one who during half a century was the first magistrate of his municipality"). stating:

Né en 1881, il a créé la Ferme-Neuve en 1903 pour l'élevage des percherons. Maire bâtisseur, député de l'Orne de 1936 à 1942. Il a créé le syndicat d'électrification de Dorceau, donné des terres pour le cimetière. Innovateur reconnu dans le monde agricole, il était commandant de la Légion d'honneur.
(Born in 1881, he created the Ferme-Neuve in 1903 for raising percherons. Mayor builder, deputy of the Orne from 1936 to 1942. He created the electrification union of Dorceau, donated land for the cemetery. A recognized innovator in the agricultural world, he was commander of the Légion d'honneur.)

Great-great-grandson Joseph unveiled the plaque. The new hall went into use by November 2018 in Aveline's name.

- Prix Joseph Aveline (horse racing)
- Salle Joseph Avelines des mariages et conseils dans Rémalard-en-Perche (2018)
- Commander of the Legion of Honor (Commandeur de la Légion d'Honneur)
- Croix de Guerre
- Commander of Agricultural Merit (Commandeur du Mérite agricole)

== See also ==
- Dorceau
- Orne
- Percheron

== External sources ==
- Assemblée Nationale: Photo of Aveline
- Assemblée Nationale: Popular Front 1936
- Perche Gouet: Photo of Aveline
- Geneawiki: Canton de Rémalard
