= Maisons =

Maisons (French for "houses") is the name or part of the name of several communes in France:

- Maisons, Aude, in the Aude department
- Maisons, Calvados, in the Calvados department, Normandy
- Maisons, Eure-et-Loir, in the Eure-et-Loir department
- Maisons-Alfort, in the suburbs of Paris
- Maisons-du-Bois-Lièvremont, in the Doubs department, Bourgogne-Franche-Comté
- Maisons-en-Champagne, in the Marne department
- Maisons-Laffitte, in the Yvelines department, Île-de-France
  - Château de Maisons, a 17th-century manor house
- Maisons-lès-Chaource, in the Aube department, Grand Est
- Maisons-lès-Soulaines, in the Aube department, Grand Est

== See also ==
- Maisonsgoutte, in the Bas-Rhin department, Alsace, France
- Maison (disambiguation)
