= Boissy-Maugis =

- Part of Cour-Maugis sur Huisne
- Location of Boissy-Maugis
- Location within France Location within Normandy
- Coordinates: 48°26′30″N 0°42′46″E
- Country: France
- Region: Normandy
- Department: Orne
- Arrondissement: Mortagne-au-Perche
- Canton: Bretoncelles
- Commune: Cour-Maugis sur Huisne
- Area^{1}: 22.44 km^{2} (8.66 sq mi)
- Elevation: 304 m (997 ft)
- Highest elevation: 249 m (817 ft)
- Lowest elevation: 122 m (400 ft)
- Population (2013): 358
  - Density: 16.0/km^{2} (41.3/sq mi)
- Time zone: UTC+01:00 (CET)
  - Summer (DST): UTC+02:00 (CEST)
- Postal code: 61110
- ^{1} French Land Register data, which excludes lakes, ponds, glaciers > 1 km^{2} (0.386 sq mi or 247 acres) and river estuaries.

Boissy-Maugis (French pronunciation: [bwasi moʒi]) is a former commune in the Orne department in northwestern France. On 1 January 2016, it was merged into the new commune of Cour-Maugis sur Huisne.

== See also ==
- Communes of the Orne department
