= La Madeleine-Bouvet =

- Commune
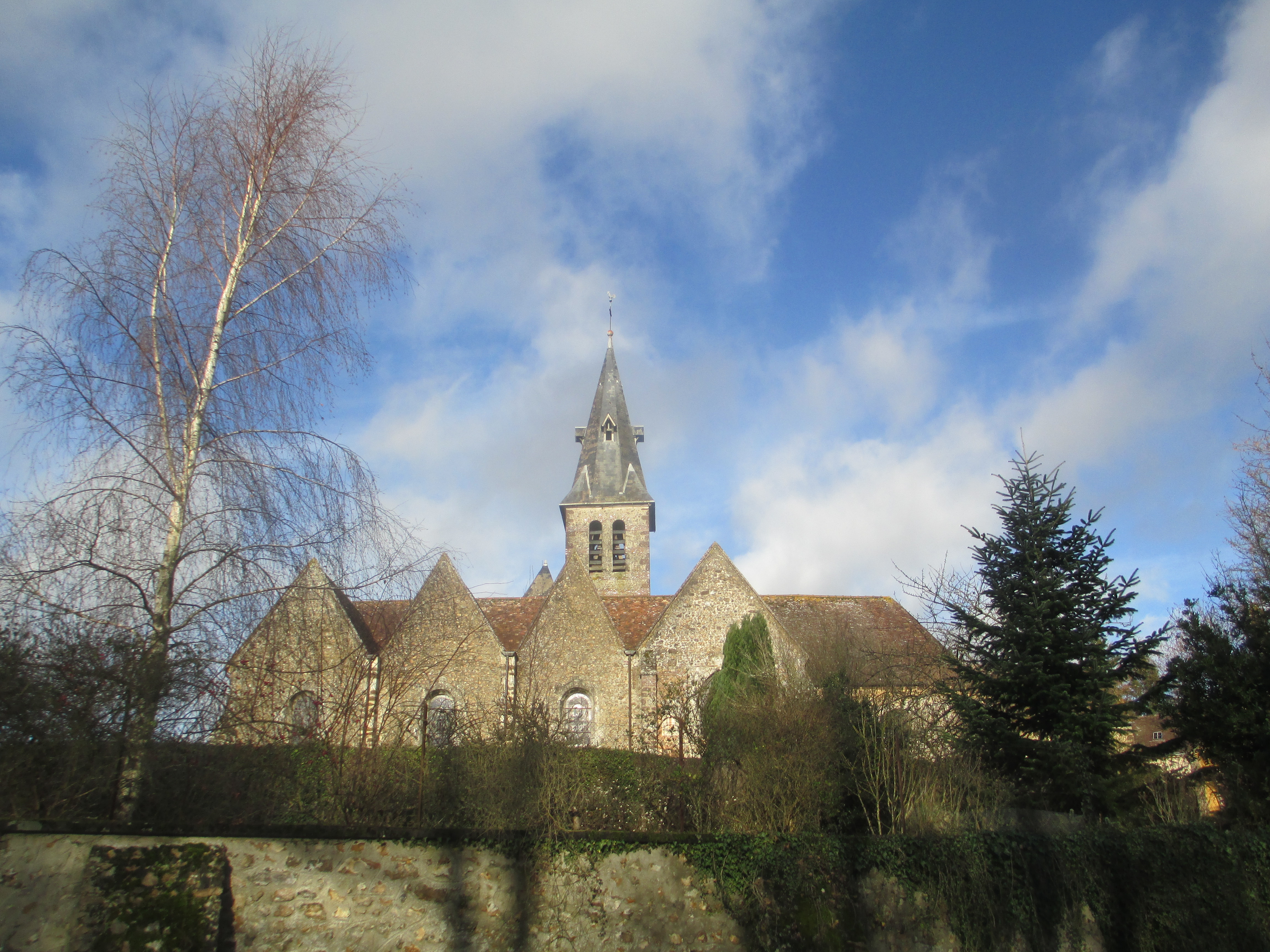
- The church in La Madeleine-Bouvet
- Location of La Madeleine-Bouvet
- Location within France Location within Normandy
- Coordinates: 48°28′19″N 0°54′11″E
- Country: France
- Region: Normandy
- Department: Orne
- Arrondissement: Mortagne-au-Perche
- Canton: Bretoncelles
- Intercommunality: CC Cœur du Perche

Government
  - Mayor (2020–2026): Olivier Boulay
- Area^{1}: 12.92 km^{2} (4.99 sq mi)
- Highest elevation: 229 m (751 ft)
- Lowest elevation: 138 m (453 ft)
- Population (2023): 400
  - Density: 31/km^{2} (80/sq mi)
- Time zone: UTC+01:00 (CET)
  - Summer (DST): UTC+02:00 (CEST)
- INSEE/Postal code: 61241 /61110
- ^{1} French Land Register data, which excludes lakes, ponds, glaciers > 1 km^{2} (0.386 sq mi or 247 acres) and river estuaries.

La Madeleine-Bouvet (French pronunciation: [la madlɛn buvɛ]) is a commune in the Orne department in north-western France.

== Geography ==
The commune is made up of the following collection of villages and hamlets, Les Déserts, La Madeleine-Bouvet, La Nouebernon, La Pestière, La Beaudorière, Mesnault and La Godardière.

The Commune along with another 70 communes shares part of a 47,681 hectare, Natura 2000 conservation area, called the Forêts et étangs du Perche.

Two rivers flow through the commune, La Donnette and La Corbionne.

== See also ==
- Communes of the Orne department
