= Alfred Bansard des Bois =

French politician

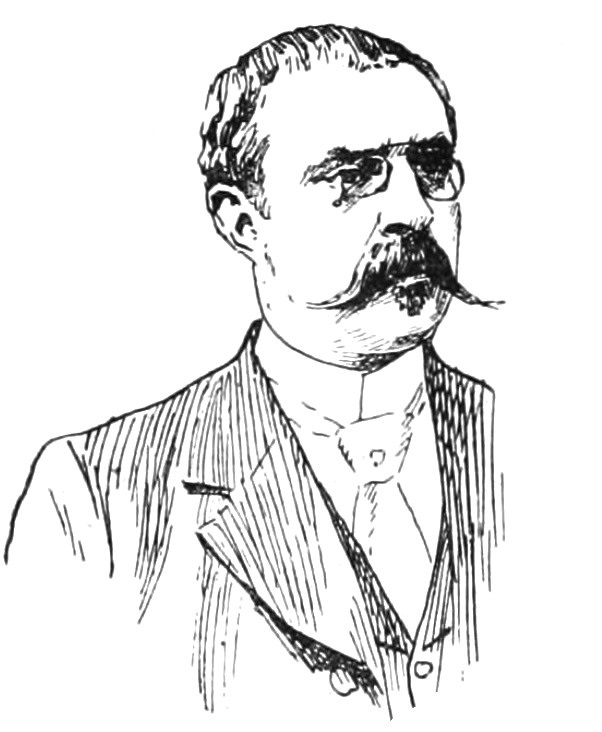
- Born: April 29, 1848; Rémalard, Orne, France
- Died: September 26, 1920 (aged 72); Bellême, Orne, France
- Occupation: Politician

Alfred Bansard des Bois (1848–1920) was a French politician. He served as a member of the Chamber of Deputies from 1881 to 1885 and from 1893 to 1914 while representing Orne.
