= Rémalard en Perche =

- Commune
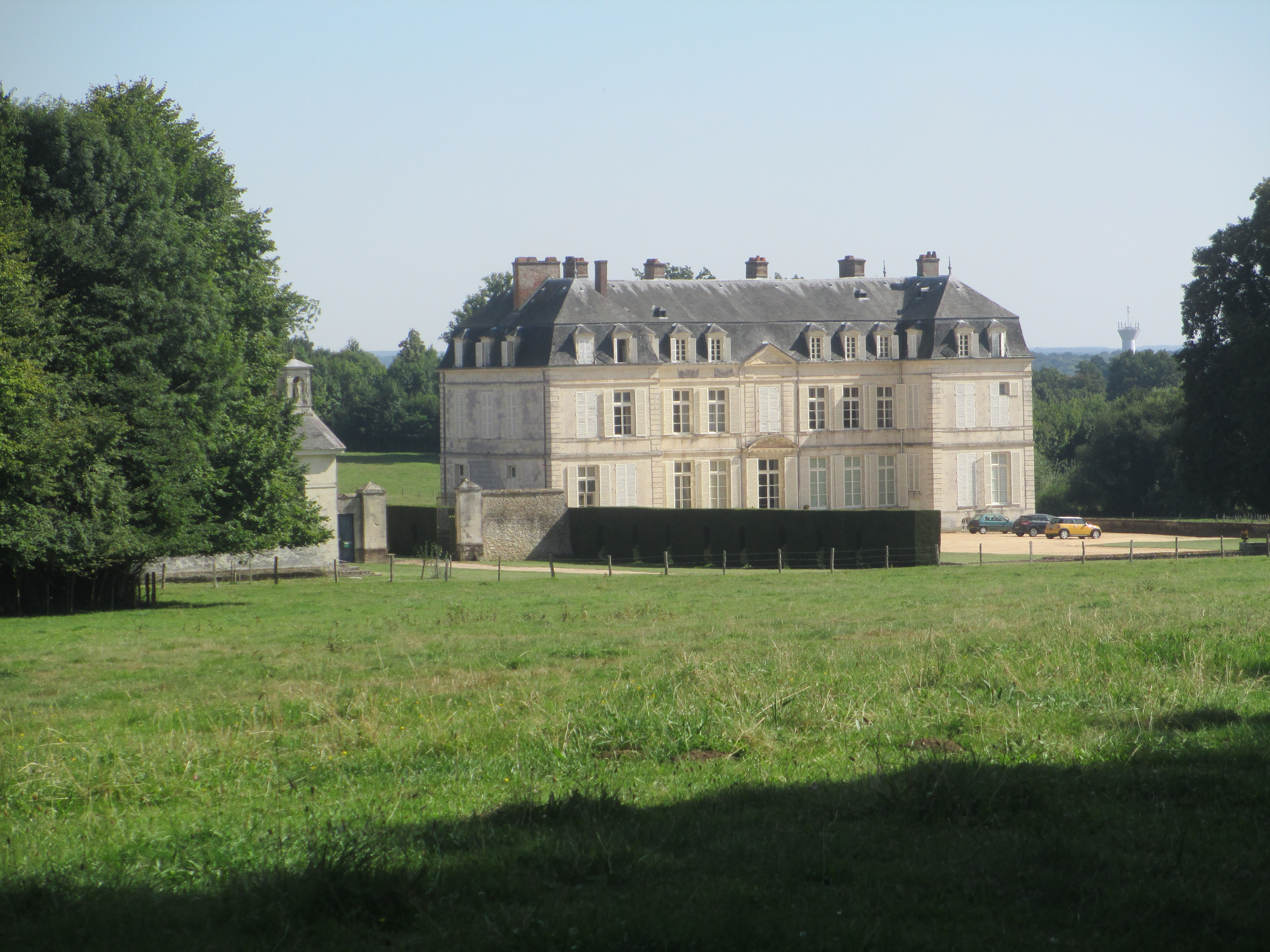
- The chateau of Voré in Rémalard en Perche
- Location of Rémalard en Perche
- Location within France Location within Normandy
- Coordinates: 48°25′44″N 0°46′30″E
- Country: France
- Region: Normandy
- Department: Orne
- Arrondissement: Mortagne-au-Perche
- Canton: Bretoncelles
- Intercommunality: Cœur du Perche

Government
  - Mayor (2020–2026): Patrick Rodhain
- Area^{1}: 50.68 km^{2} (19.57 sq mi)
- Population (2023): 1,866
  - Density: 36.82/km^{2} (95.36/sq mi)
- Time zone: UTC+01:00 (CET)
  - Summer (DST): UTC+02:00 (CEST)
- INSEE/Postal code: 61345 /61110
- ^{1} French Land Register data, which excludes lakes, ponds, glaciers > 1 km^{2} (0.386 sq mi or 247 acres) and river estuaries.

Rémalard en Perche (French pronunciation: [ʁemalaʁ ɑ̃ pɛʁʃ], literally Rémalard in Perche) is a commune in the department of Orne, northwestern France. The municipality was established on 1 January 2016 by merger of the former communes of Bellou-sur-Huisne, Dorceau and Rémalard (the seat).

== Geography ==
The commune is made up of the following collection of villages and hamlets, Freulemont, La Fontenelle, Malitourne, La Rifetière, Les Villes, Rémalard en Perche, Bellou-sur-Huisne, Dorceau, La Gibonnière, La Courrougère, Les Marres, La Chênaie, Les Vallées, La Sermondière and Launay Mahé.

The Commune along with another 70 communes shares part of a 47,681 hectare, Natura 2000 conservation area, called the Forêts et étangs du Perche.

The river Huisne flows through the commune.

== Points of interest ==
- Boiscorde Arboretum is a 15-hectare arboretum featuring over 500 trees.
- La Petite Rochelle is a 1 hectare botanical garden, open to the public which is classified as a classified as Jardins remarquables by the Ministry of Culture and the Comité des Parcs et Jardins de France.
- Carrière de la Mansonnière is a Natura 2000 conservation site measuring 0.17 Hectares. The site is a former quarry, used between the middle ages and early twentieth century which now hosts five varieties of bats, listed in Annex 2 of the Habitats Directive, which are the Lesser horseshoe bat, Western barbastelle, Geoffroy's bat, Bechstein's bat and the Greater mouse-eared bat.

=== National heritage sites ===
The commune has 11 buildings and areas listed as a monument historique.

- Saint-Laurent Church, an eleventh-century church in Dorceau.
- Château de Voré, an eighteenth-century chateau in Rémalard.
- Manoir de Brigemont, a sixteenth-century manor house in Rémalard.
- Le Chatellier Castle Motte, a strategic site for William the Conqueror in his conquest of the Lordship of Bellême in 1077.
- Manoir des Touches, a sixteenth-century manor house in Dorceau.
- Rémalard Church, a twelfth-century church.
- Manoir de Vaujour, a sixteenth-century manor house in Rémalard.
- Voré Tilery, a former tile factory in Rémalard, thought to date from 1828.
- New Farm, a twentieth-century farm in Dorceau that was built to breed the Percheron horse.
- Manoir de Boiscorde, a fifteenth-century manor house in Rémalard.
- Motte castrale dite Le Château, a raised circular enclosure on what was built a shell keep. In 1077, this castle was under siege from William the Conqueror when his son, Robert Curthose locked himself up there.

=== Architecture contemporaine remarquable ===
- L’Hermitage - is a hexaganol plan house built in 1949 by architect Gage André, in 2007 it was given the label of Architecture contemporaine remarquable.

== Notable people ==
- Pierre-François Jumeau - (1811-1895) the founder of Jumeau was born here.
- Alfred Bansard des Bois - (1848–1920) a French politician was born here.
- Joseph Aveline - (1881-1958) a politician and horse breeder was born here.

== Twin towns – sister cities ==
Rémalard en Perche is twinned with:

- Castle Cary, England, United Kingdom since 1984

== See also ==
- Communes of the Orne department
