= Cour-Maugis sur Huisne =

- Commune
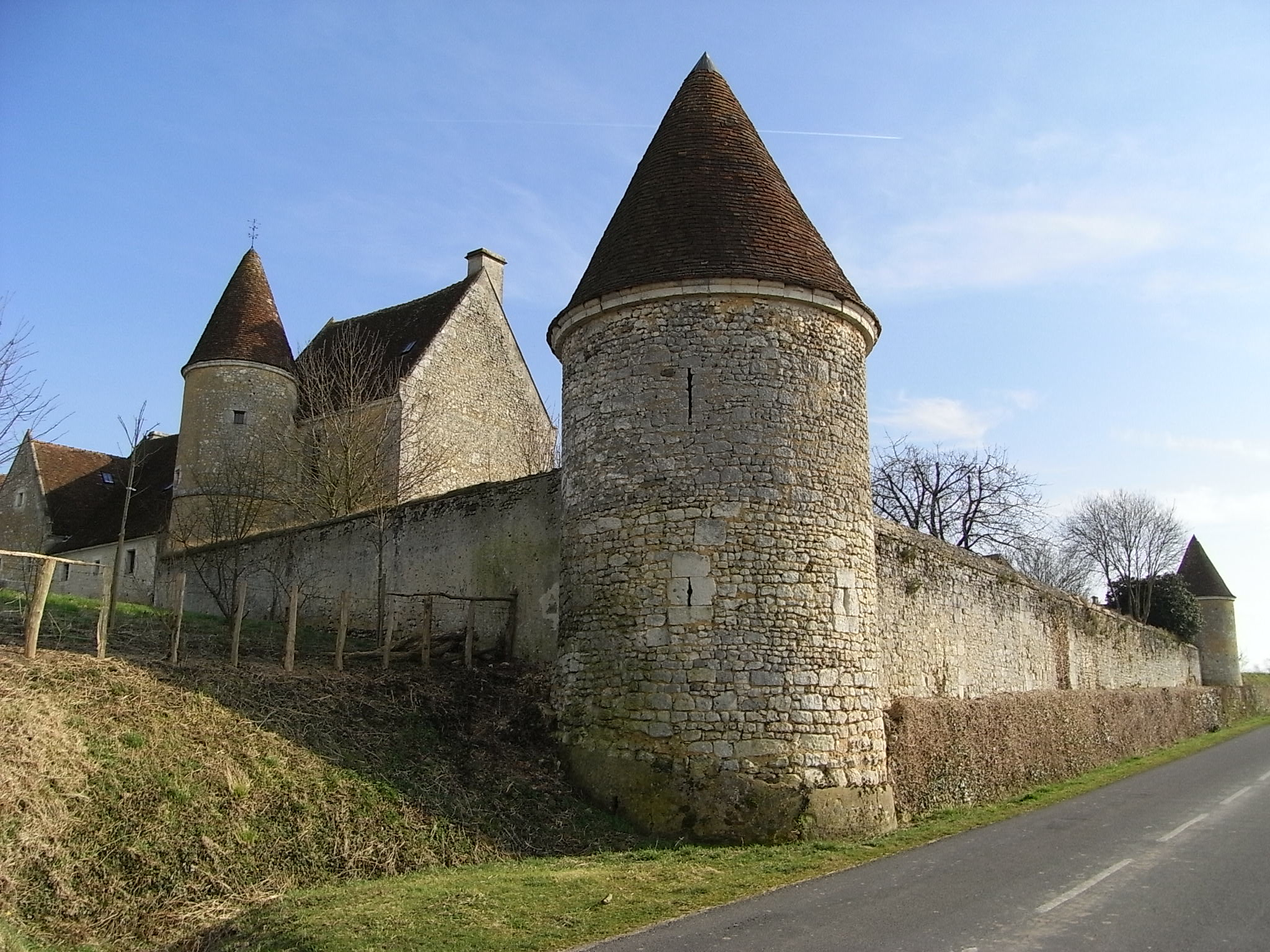
- The manor Moussetière in Boissy-Maugis
- Location of Cour-Maugis sur Huisne
- Location within France Location within Normandy
- Coordinates: 48°26′28″N 0°42′50″E
- Country: France
- Region: Normandy
- Department: Orne
- Arrondissement: Mortagne-au-Perche
- Canton: Bretoncelles

Government
  - Mayor (2020–2026): Guy Rigot
- Area^{1}: 47.28 km^{2} (18.25 sq mi)
- Population (2023): 583
  - Density: 12.3/km^{2} (31.9/sq mi)
- Time zone: UTC+01:00 (CET)
  - Summer (DST): UTC+02:00 (CEST)
- INSEE/Postal code: 61050 /61110, 61340
- ^{1} French Land Register data, which excludes lakes, ponds, glaciers > 1 km^{2} (0.386 sq mi or 247 acres) and river estuaries.

Cour-Maugis sur Huisne (French pronunciation: [kuʁ moʒi syʁ ɥin]) is a commune in the department of Orne, northwestern France. The municipality was established on 1 January 2016 by merger of the former communes of Boissy-Maugis (the seat), Courcerault, Maison-Maugis and Saint-Maurice-sur-Huisne.

== Geography ==
The commune is made up of the following collection of villages and hamlets, Saint-Laurent, La Grande Foucaudière, La Diardière, L'Aunay Boucher, La Coutellerie, Les Augerets, Figny, Pomerai, Maison-Maugis, Courcerault and La Beaudonnière.

The Commune along with another 70 communes shares part of a 47,681 hectare, Natura 2000 conservation area, called the Forêts et étangs du Perche.

Three rivers the Huisne, La Commeauche and La Jambée, flow through the commune.

== Points of interest ==
=== National heritage sites ===
The Commune has four buildings and areas listed as a Monument historique.

- Château à Cour-Maugis sur Huisne is a thirteenth century chateau, listed as a monument in 1991.
- Grosse-Pierre Dolmen a neolithicdolmen registered as a Monument historique in 1949.
- Manoir de la Moussetière a sixteenth century manor house, registered as a Monument historique in 1980.
- Manoir des Perrignes a fifteenth century manor, registered as a Monument historique in 1998.

=== Architecture contemporaine remarquable ===
- Maison La Tuilerie is a private house built in 1978 that was awarded the status of Architecture contemporaine remarquable in 2003.

== See also ==
- Communes of the Orne department
