= Louis de Boissy =

French poet and playwright

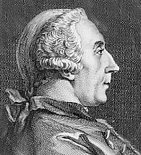
Louis de Boissy

Louis de Boissy (26 November 1694, Vic-sur-Cère, Province of Auvergne – 19 April 1758, Paris) was an 18th-century French poet and playwright. He was elected to seat 6 of the Académie française on 12 August 1754. He wrote satires and several comedies, of which the best is Les Dehors trompeurs ou l'Homme du jour (The False Appearances, or the Man of the Moment), the great success of the 1740 season, with a cast including Quinault-Dufresne and Jeanne Quinault. Boissy had the concession to print the Mercure de France. His son was Louis Michel de Boissy. The historian Louis Michel de Boissy was his son.

== Works ==
His works were published in 9 volumes in-8 in Paris in 1766.

Theatre

- 1721: L'Amant de sa femme, ou la Rivale d'elle-même, one-act comedy in prose, Théâtre-Français, 19 September Text online
- 1724: L'Impatient, five-act comedy in verse, preceded by a prologue, Théâtre-Français, 26 January
- 1725: Le Babillard, one-act comedy in verse Théâtre-Français, 16 June Text online
- 1727: Admète et Alceste, five-act tragedy, Théâtre-Français, 25 January
- 1727: Le Français à Londres, one-act comedy in prose, Théâtre-Français, 19 July Text online
- 1727: La Mort d'Alceste, five-act tragedy in verse, Théâtre-Français, 26 November
- 1728: Don Ramire et Zaïde, five-act tragedy in verse, Théâtre-Français, 24 January
- 1729: L'Impertinent malgré lui, ou les Amants mal assortis, five-act comedy in verse, Théâtre-Français, 14 May
- 1729: Melpomène vengée, ou les Trois Spectacles réduits à un et les Amours des déesses à rien, one-act comedy in prose, Théâtre-Français, 3 September
- 1730: Le Triomphe de l'intérêt, one-act comedy in verse with a divertissement and two comédies en vaudevilles, Comédie Italienne, 8 November
- 1731: Momus exilé, ou le Je ne sais quoi, one-act comedy in free verse, Comédie Italienne, 10 September Text online
- 1732: La Critique, one-act comedy in free verse, Comédie Italienne, 9 February
- 1732: La Vie est un songe, three-act comédie héroïque in verse, Comédie Italienne, 12 November
- 1732: L'Auteur superstitieux, à-propos in 1 act, Comédie Italienne, 9 February Text online
- 1733: Les Étrennes, ou la Bagatelle, one-act comedy in verse, Comédie Italienne, January
- 1733: Le Badinage, ou le Dernier Jour de l'absence, one-act comedy in verse, Théâtre-Français, 23 November
- 1734: La Surprise de la haine, three-act comedy in verse, Comédie Italienne, 10 February
- 1734: L'Apologie du siècle, ou Momus corrigé, one-act comedy in free verse, Comédie Italienne, 1 April
- 1734: Les Billets doux, comédie divertissement in verse, Comédie Italienne, 15 September
- 1735: Les Amours anonymes, three-act comedy in verse, Comedie Italienne, 5 December
- 1736: Le Comte de Neuilly, comédie héroïque in 5 acts and in verse, Comédie Italienne, 18 January
- 1737: Les Deux Nièces, ou la Confidente d'elle-même, five-act comedy in verse, Théâtre-Français, 17 January
- 1737: La ****, three-act comedy in verse, Comédie Italienne, 17 August 1737
- 1738: Le Pouvoir de la sympathie, three-act comedy in verse, Théâtre-Français, 5 July
- 1739: Le Rival favorable, three-act comedy in verse, Comédie Italienne, 30 January
- 1739: Les Talents à la mode, three-act comedy in verse, Comédie Italienne, 17 September
- 1740: Dehors les trompeurs, ou l'Homme du jour, five-act comedy in verse, Théâtre-Français, 18 February Text online
- 1741: L'Embarras du choix, five-act comedy in verse, Paris, Théâtre-Français, 11 December Text online
- 1742: Le Mari garçon, three-act comedy in verse, Comédie Italienne, 10 February 1742
- 1743: Paméla en France, ou la Vertu mieux éprouvée, three-act comedy in verse, Comédie Italienne, 4 March
- 1743: La Fête d'Auteuil ou la Fausse Méprise, three-act comedy in verse, Théâtre-Français, August
- 1744: L'Époux par supercherie (The Husband by Trickery), two-act comedy, Théâtre-Français, 8 March Text online
- 1745: La Folie du jour, one-act comedy in verse, Théâtre-Français, 5 July
- 1745: Le Sage Etourdi, three-act comedy in verse, Théâtre-Français, 5 July Text online
- 1745: Le Médecin par occasion, five-act comedy in verse, Théâtre-Français, 12 March Text online
- 1745: Le Plagiaire, three-act comedy in verse, Comédie Italienne, 1 February
- 1746: Le Duc de Surrey, five-act pièce héroïque in verse, Théâtre-Français, 18 May
- 1748: Les Valets maîtres, comédie en vers libres et en 2 actes, Comédie Italienne, 20 February
- 1748: La Péruvienne, five-act comedy in free verse, Théâtre-Français, 5 June
- 1749: Le Retour de la paix, one-act comedy in verse, Comédie Italienne, 22 February Text online
- 1749: La Comète, one-act comedy in free verse, Théâtre-Français, 11 June
- 1751: Le Prix du silence, three-act comedy in verse, Théâtre italien de Paris, 26 February
- 1753: La Frivolité, one-act comedy in verse, Comédie Italienne, 23 January
- 1753: Programme d'Eugénie, ou des Effets de l'amour, three-act comedy, with 3 intermeds, Château de Fontainebleau, 15 November
- 1753: Le Maire de village, opera in prose, Théâtre de l'Ambigu-Comique, 6 February

Varia

- 1718: L'Élève de Terpsichore, ou le Nourrisson de la satire
- 1751: Les Filles femmes et les femmes filles, ou le Monde changé, conte qui n'en est pas un. Les Quinze minutes ou le Temps bien employé, conte d'un quart d'heure

== Sources ==
- Jean le Rond D'Alembert, « Éloge de Boissy » in Œuvres complètes de d'Alembert, Paris, Belin et Bossange, t. 3, 1re partie, 1821, p. 507-521
