= Bretoncelles =

- Commune
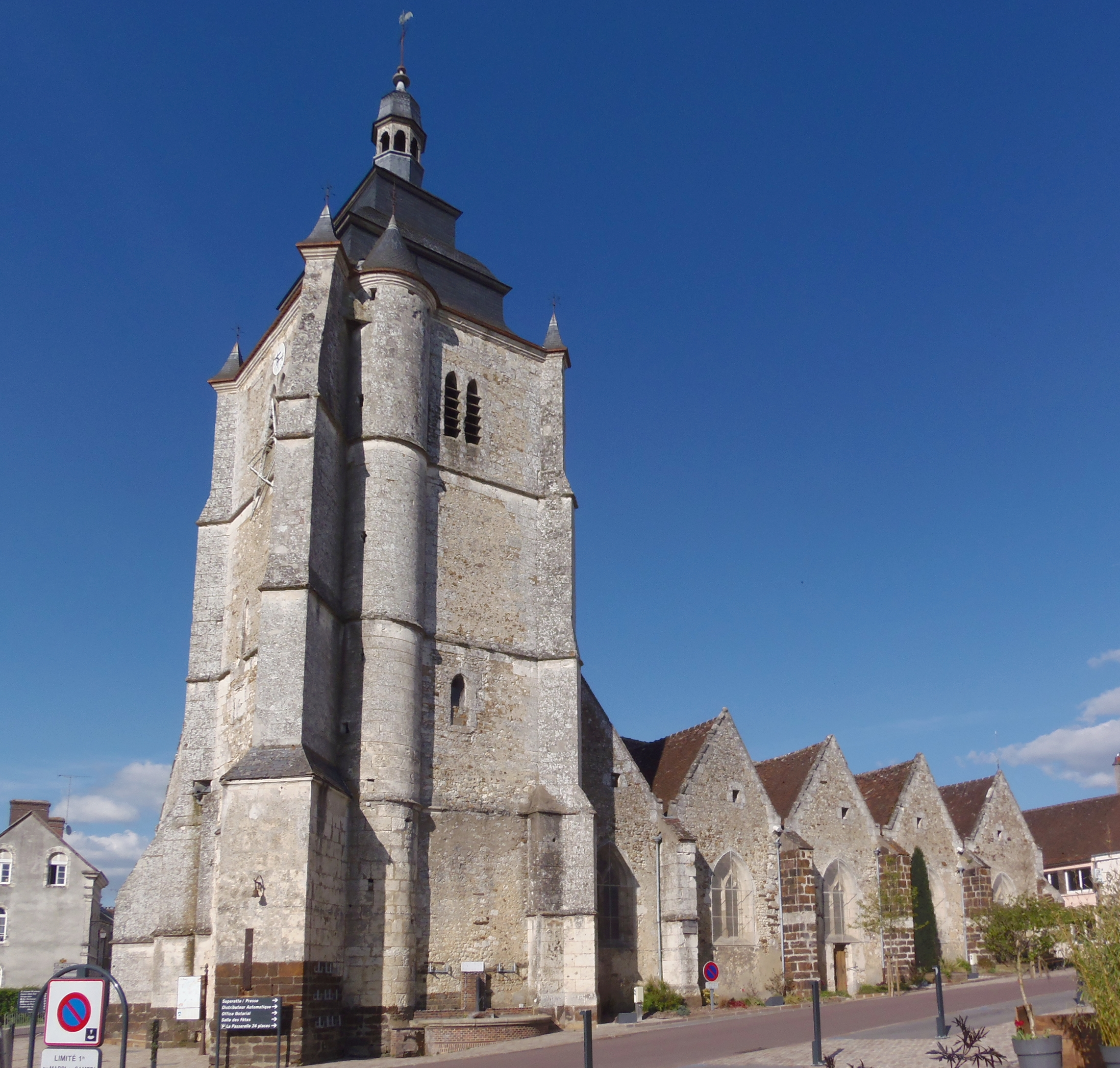
- The church in Bretoncelles

- Coat of arms
- Location of Bretoncelles
- Location within France Location within Normandy
- Coordinates: 48°25′57″N 0°53′18″E
- Country: France
- Region: Normandy
- Department: Orne
- Arrondissement: Mortagne-au-Perche
- Canton: Bretoncelles
- Intercommunality: Cœur du Perche

Government
  - Mayor (2020–2026): Daniel Chevee
- Area^{1}: 40.21 km^{2} (15.53 sq mi)
- Elevation: 155 m (509 ft)
- Highest elevation: 266 m (873 ft)
- Lowest elevation: 120 m (390 ft)
- Population (2023): 1,455
  - Density: 36.19/km^{2} (93.72/sq mi)
- Time zone: UTC+01:00 (CET)
  - Summer (DST): UTC+02:00 (CEST)
- INSEE/Postal code: 61061 /61110
- ^{1} French Land Register data, which excludes lakes, ponds, glaciers > 1 km^{2} (0.386 sq mi or 247 acres) and river estuaries.

Bretoncelles (French pronunciation: [bʁətɔ̃sɛl]) is a commune in the Orne department in northwestern France.

== Geography ==
The commune is made up of the following collection of villages and hamlets, La Gilardière, La Dougère, La Godefraise, La Pézassière, La Booz, Thivaux, La Bazollière, Ardelain, Bretoncelles and La Saussaie.

The Commune along with another 70 communes shares part of a 47,681 hectare, Natura 2000 conservation area, called the Forêts et étangs du Perche.

Two rivers flow through the commune, La Donnette and La Corbionne.

== Population ==
Historical population
Year	Pop.	±% p.a.
1968	1,215	—
1975	1,285	+0.80%
1982	1,270	−0.17%
1990	1,221	−0.49%
1999	1,343	+1.06%
2007	1,408	+0.59%
2012	1,464	+0.78%
2017	1,487	+0.31%
2023	1,455	−0.36%
Source: INSEE

== Transport ==
The commune has a railway station that was opened in 1857 and serves part of the Paris–Brest line.

== Notable people ==
- Daniel Goulet - (1928 - 2007) was a French politician who was born here.
- Léonce Corne - (1894 – 1977) was a French film actor who is buried here.

== See also ==
- Communes of the Orne department
