= Louis Michel de Boissy =

French historian

Louis Michel de Boissy (1725 – 1793, Vic-sur-Cère) was an 18th-century French historian.

The son of playwright and Academician Louis de Boissy, he authored several translations of classics from the Hebrew, and a supplement to the Histoire des Juifs by Jacques Basnage de Beauval.

His historical essays were meant to be part of a larger work, but their lack of success discouraged the historian to publish them and he killed himself by defenestration. Those which were published were entitled: L’idolâtrie d’Abraham avant sa conversion, d’Abimélech roi de Gerare, d’Aaron frère de Moïse, du prophète Abdias, de l’opinion des Saducéens et des Samaritains sur les Anges, des lieux nommés Abel et Abila et d’Aelia Capitolia, de l’état des Juifs en France sous la première et sous la seconde Race, et des commencements de la troisième, de l’état des juifs en Afrique, d’Isaac Abarbanel, d’Uriel Acosta, d’Aaron Ben Joseph juif Caraïte, d’Aaron Ben Elie juif de la même secte, d'Aben Esra et de Maïmonide.

== Publications ==
- Histoire de Simonide et du siècle où il a vécu, avec des éclaircissements chronologiques, 1755 Text online
- Dissertations historiques et critiques sur la vie du grand prêtre Aaron, 1761
- Dissertations critiques pour servir d'éclaircissements à l'histoire des Juifs, avant et depuis Jésus-Christ, et de supplément à l'histoire de M. Basnage, 2 vol., Paris, Lagrange, 1785. La seconde édition parue en 1787 chez le même éditeur, comporte deux dissertations de plus sur on Esra and Maimonides,

== Sources ==
- Louis-Gabriel Michaud, Biographie universelle ancienne et moderne, vol. IV, 1834, (p. 594)
