= Boissy-Lamberville =

- Commune
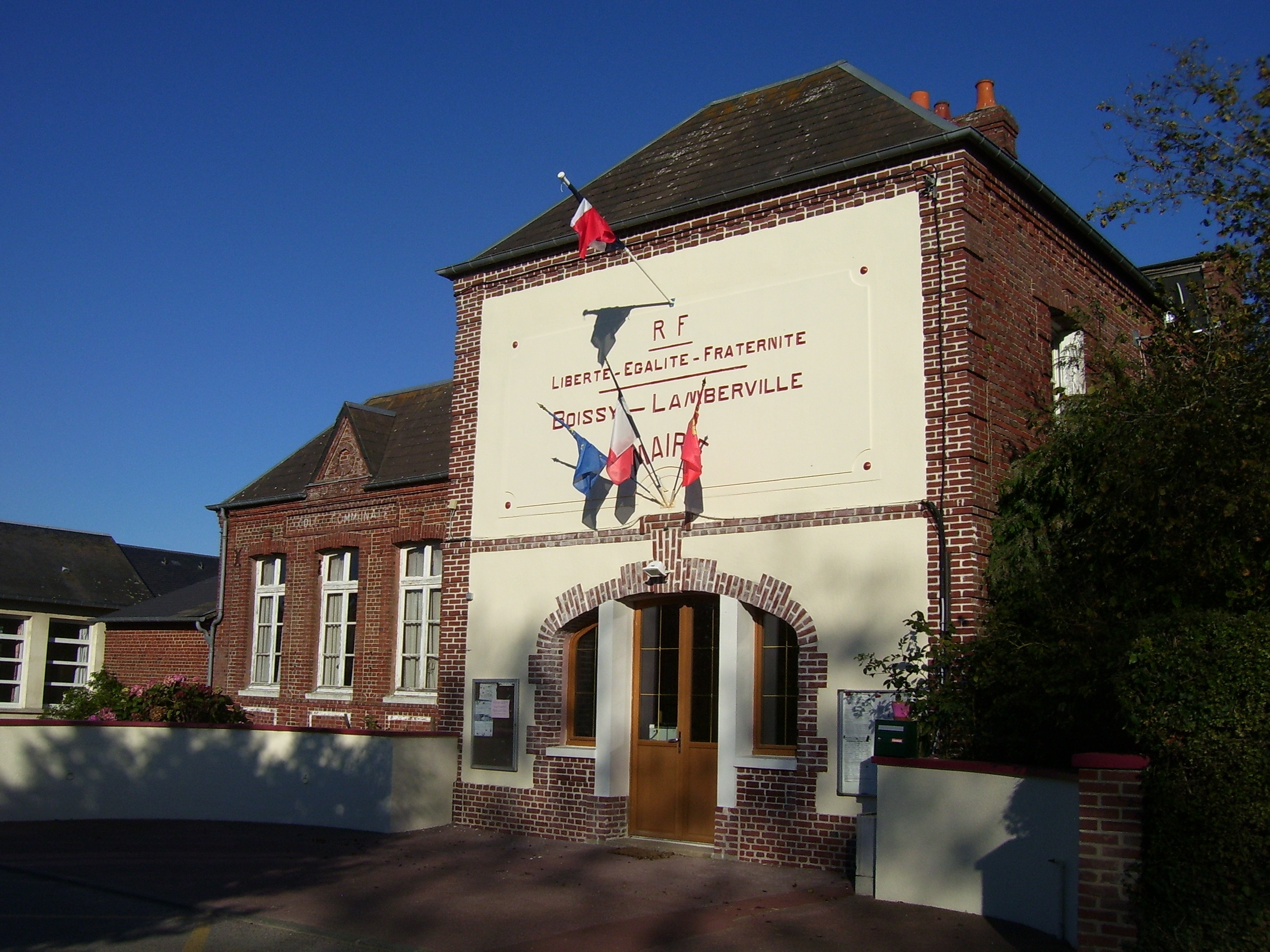
- Town hall
- Location of Boissy-Lamberville
- Location within France Location within Normandy
- Coordinates: 49°10′05″N 0°34′39″E
- Country: France
- Region: Normandy
- Department: Eure
- Arrondissement: Bernay
- Canton: Beuzeville

Government
  - Mayor (2026–32): Olivier Bourdon
- Area^{1}: 8.08 km^{2} (3.12 sq mi)
- Elevation: 178 m (584 ft)
- Highest elevation: 177 m (581 ft)
- Lowest elevation: 162 m (531 ft)
- Population (2023): 385
  - Density: 47.6/km^{2} (123/sq mi)
- Time zone: UTC+01:00 (CET)
  - Summer (DST): UTC+02:00 (CEST)
- INSEE/Postal code: 27079 /27300
- ^{1} French Land Register data, which excludes lakes, ponds, glaciers > 1 km^{2} (0.386 sq mi or 247 acres) and river estuaries.

Boissy-Lamberville (French pronunciation: [bwasi lɑ̃bɛʁvil]) is a commune in the Eure department in Normandy in northern France.

== Population ==
Historical population
Year	Pop.	±% p.a.
1968	254	—
1975	235	−1.10%
1982	245	+0.60%
1990	281	+1.73%
1999	276	−0.20%
2007	276	+0.00%
2012	311	+2.42%
2017	350	+2.39%
2023	385	+1.60%
Source: INSEE

== See also ==
- Communes of the Eure department
