= Canton of Bretoncelles =

Coordinates: 48.43°N 0.89°E

The canton of Bretoncelles is an administrative division of the Orne department, northwestern France. It was created at the French canton reorganisation which came into effect in March 2015. Its seat is in Bretoncelles.

It consists of the following communes:

1. Berd'huis
2. Bretoncelles
3. Cour-Maugis-sur-Huisne
4. La Madeleine-Bouvet
5. Moutiers-au-Perche
6. Perche-en-Nocé
7. Rémalard-en-Perche
8. Sablons-sur-Huisne
9. Saint-Cyr-la-Rosière
10. Saint-Germain-des-Grois
11. Saint-Pierre-la-Bruyère
12. Verrières
