= Mondonville =

Mondonville may refer to:

- Mondonville, Haute-Garonne, a commune in southwestern France
- Mondonville-Saint-Jean, Eure-et-Loir, a commune in northern France
- Jean-Joseph de Mondonville (1711-1772), French violinist and composer
