= Santeuil =

Santeuil may refer to the following places in France:

- Santeuil, Eure-et-Loir, a commune in the Eure-et-Loir department
- Santeuil, Val-d'Oise, a commune in the Val-d'Oise department
