= Arrondissement of Chartres =

Arrondissement in France

Coordinates: 48°27′N 1°29′E

Chartres
- Arrondissement
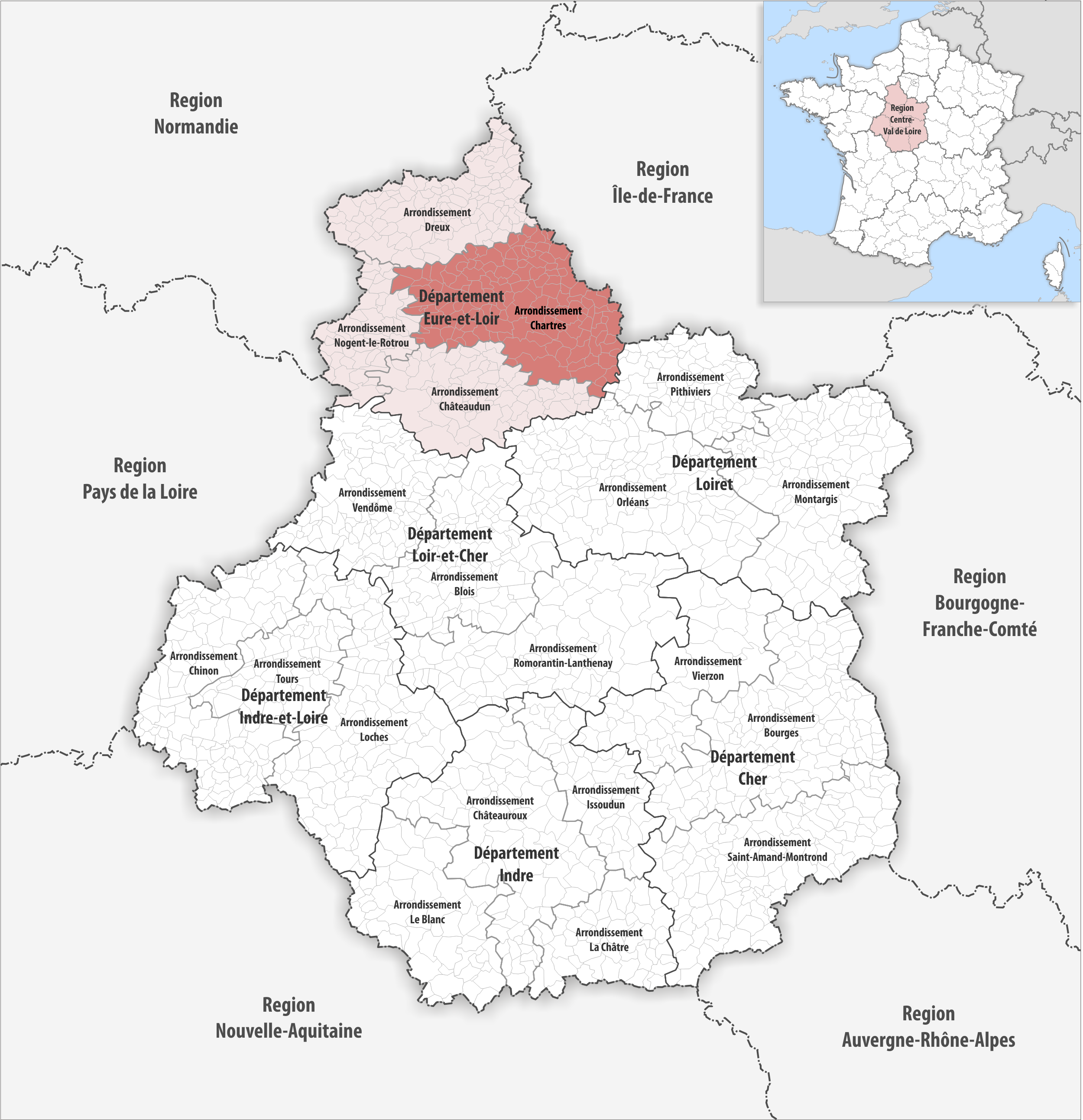
- Location within the region Centre-Val de Loire
- Country: France
- Region: Centre-Val de Loire
- Department: Eure-et-Loir
- No. of communes: {{{nbcomm}}}
- Area: 2,129.5 km^{2} (822.2 sq mi)
- Population (2023): 210,717
  - Density: 98.951/km^{2} (256.28/sq mi)
- INSEE code: 281

The arrondissement of Chartres is an arrondissement of France in the Eure-et-Loir department in the Centre-Val de Loire region. It has 146 communes. Its population is 209,632 (2021), and its area is 2,129.5 km^{2} (822.2 sq mi).

== Composition ==
The communes of the arrondissement of Chartres, and their INSEE codes, are:

1. Allonnes (28004)
2. Amilly (28006)
3. Ardelu (28009)
4. Aunay-sous-Auneau (28013)
5. Auneau-Bleury-Saint-Symphorien (28015)
6. Bailleau-Armenonville (28023)
7. Bailleau-l'Évêque (28022)
8. Bailleau-le-Pin (28021)
9. Barjouville (28024)
10. Baudreville (28026)
11. Beauvilliers (28032)
12. Berchères-Saint-Germain (28034)
13. Berchères-les-Pierres (28035)
14. Béville-le-Comte (28039)
15. Billancelles (28040)
16. Blandainville (28041)
17. Boisville-la-Saint-Père (28047)
18. Boncé (28049)
19. Bouglainval (28052)
20. La Bourdinière-Saint-Loup (28048)
21. Briconville (28060)
22. Cernay (28067)
23. Challet (28068)
24. Champhol (28070)
25. Champseru (28073)
26. La Chapelle-d'Aunainville (28074)
27. Charonville (28081)
28. Chartainvilliers (28084)
29. Chartres (28085)
30. Les Châtelliers-Notre-Dame (28091)
31. Châtenay (28092)
32. Chauffours (28095)
33. Chuisnes (28099)
34. Cintray (28100)
35. Clévilliers (28102)
36. Coltainville (28104)
37. Corancez (28107)
38. Le Coudray (28110)
39. Courville-sur-Eure (28116)
40. Dammarie (28122)
41. Dangers (28128)
42. Denonville (28129)
43. Droue-sur-Drouette (28135)
44. Écrosnes (28137)
45. Éole-en-Beauce (28406)
46. Épeautrolles (28139)
47. Épernon (28140)
48. Ermenonville-la-Grande (28141)
49. Ermenonville-la-Petite (28142)
50. Fontaine-la-Guyon (28154)
51. Fontenay-sur-Eure (28158)
52. Francourville (28160)
53. Le Favril (28148)
54. Fresnay-le-Comte (28162)
55. Fresnay-le-Gilmert (28163)
56. Fresnay-l'Évêque (28164)
57. Fruncé (28167)
58. Gallardon (28168)
59. Garancières-en-Beauce (28169)
60. Gas (28172)
61. Gasville-Oisème (28173)
62. Gellainville (28177)
63. Gommerville (28183)
64. Gouillons (28184)
65. Le Gué-de-Longroi (28188)
66. Guilleville (28189)
67. Hanches (28191)
68. Houville-la-Branche (28194)
69. Houx (28195)
70. Illiers-Combray (28196)
71. Intréville (28197)
72. Janville-en-Beauce (28199)
73. Jouy (28201)
74. Landelles (28203)
75. Léthuin (28207)
76. Levainville (28208)
77. Lèves (28209)
78. Levesville-la-Chenard (28210)
79. Louville-la-Chenard (28215)
80. Lucé (28218)
81. Luisant (28220)
82. Luplanté (28222)
83. Magny (28225)
84. Maintenon (28227)
85. Mainvilliers (28229)
86. Maisons (28230)
87. Marchéville (28234)
88. Mérouville (28243)
89. Méréglise (28242)
90. Meslay-le-Grenet (28245)
91. Mévoisins (28249)
92. Mignières (28253)
93. Mittainvilliers-Vérigny (28254)
94. Moinville-la-Jeulin (28255)
95. Mondonville-Saint-Jean (28257)
96. Morainville (28268)
97. Morancez (28269)
98. Moutiers (28274)
99. Neuville Saint Denis (28319)
100. Nogent-le-Phaye (28278)
101. Nogent-sur-Eure (28281)
102. Oinville-Saint-Liphard (28284)
103. Oinville-sous-Auneau (28285)
104. Ollé (28286)
105. Orrouer (28290)
106. Ouarville (28291)
107. Oysonville (28294)
108. Pierres (28298)
109. Poinville (28300)
110. Poisvilliers (28301)
111. Pontgouin (28302)
112. Prasville (28304)
113. Prunay-le-Gillon (28309)
114. Réclainville (28313)
115. Roinville (28317)
116. Saint-Arnoult-des-Bois (28324)
117. Saint-Aubin-des-Bois (28325)
118. Saint-Denis-des-Puits (28333)
119. Saint-Éman (28336)
120. Saint-Georges-sur-Eure (28337)
121. Saint-Germain-le-Gaillard (28339)
122. Saint-Luperce (28350)
123. Saint-Léger-des-Aubées (28344)
124. Saint-Martin-de-Nigelles (28352)
125. Saint-Piat (28357)
126. Saint-Prest (28358)
127. Sainville (28363)
128. Sandarville (28365)
129. Santeuil (28366)
130. Santilly (28367)
131. Soulaires (28379)
132. Sours (28380)
133. Theuville (28383)
134. Thivars (28388)
135. Toury (28391)
136. Trancrainville (28392)
137. Umpeau (28397)
138. Ver-lès-Chartres (28403)
139. Vierville (28408)
140. Les Villages Vovéens (28422)
141. Villars (28411)
142. Villebon (28414)
143. Voise (28421)
144. Yermenonville (28423)
145. Ymeray (28425)
146. Ymonville (28426)

== History ==
The arrondissement of Chartres was created in 1800.

As a result of the reorganisation of the cantons of France which came into effect in 2015, the borders of the cantons are no longer related to the borders of the arrondissements. The cantons of the arrondissement of Chartres were, as of January 2015:

1. Auneau
2. Chartres-Nord-Est
3. Chartres-Sud-Est
4. Chartres-Sud-Ouest
5. Courville-sur-Eure
6. Illiers-Combray
7. Janville
8. Lucé
9. Maintenon
10. Mainvilliers
11. Voves
