= Bailleau-Armenonville =

- Commune
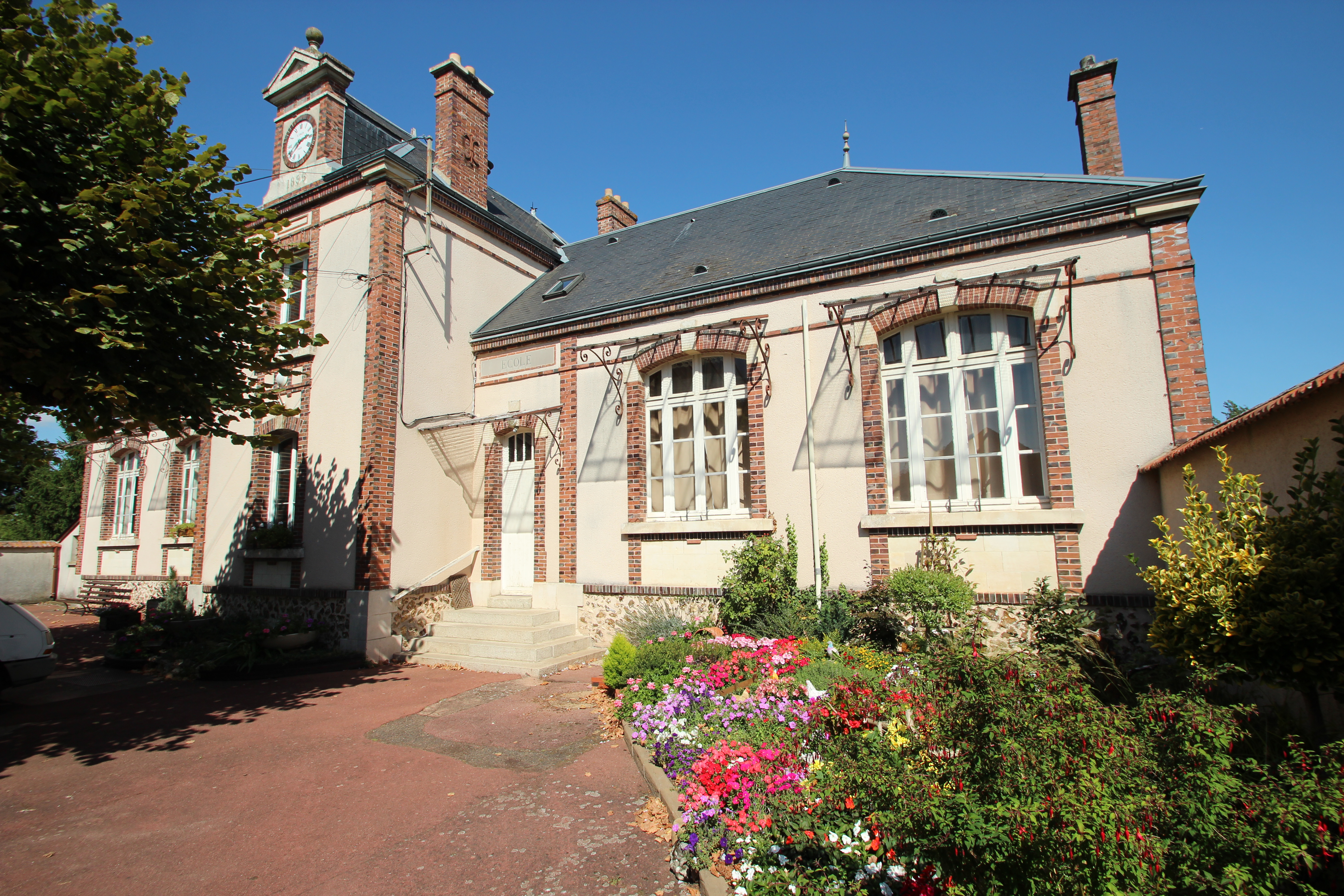
- The town hall in Bailleau-Armenonville
- Location of Bailleau-Armenonville
- Location within France Location within Centre-Val de Loire
- Coordinates: 48°32′00″N 1°39′07″E
- Country: France
- Region: Centre-Val de Loire
- Department: Eure-et-Loir
- Arrondissement: Chartres
- Canton: Auneau

Government
  - Mayor (2020–2026): Gérald Garnier
- Area^{1}: 17.46 km^{2} (6.74 sq mi)
- Elevation: 122 m (400 ft)
- Highest elevation: 158 m (518 ft)
- Lowest elevation: 107 m (351 ft)
- Population (2023): 1,299
  - Density: 74.40/km^{2} (192.7/sq mi)
- Time zone: UTC+01:00 (CET)
  - Summer (DST): UTC+02:00 (CEST)
- INSEE/Postal code: 28023 /28320
- ^{1} French Land Register data, which excludes lakes, ponds, glaciers > 1 km^{2} (0.386 sq mi or 247 acres) and river estuaries.

Bailleau-Armenonville (French pronunciation: [bajo aʁmənɔ̃vil]) is a commune in the Eure-et-Loir department in northern France.

== Population ==
Historical population
Year	Pop.	±% p.a.
1968	682	—
1975	727	+0.92%
1982	818	+1.70%
1990	1,044	+3.10%
1999	1,179	+1.36%
2007	1,342	+1.63%
2012	1,422	+1.16%
2017	1,386	−0.51%
2023	1,299	−1.07%
Source: INSEE

== See also ==
- Communes of the Eure-et-Loir department
