= Morainville =

- Commune
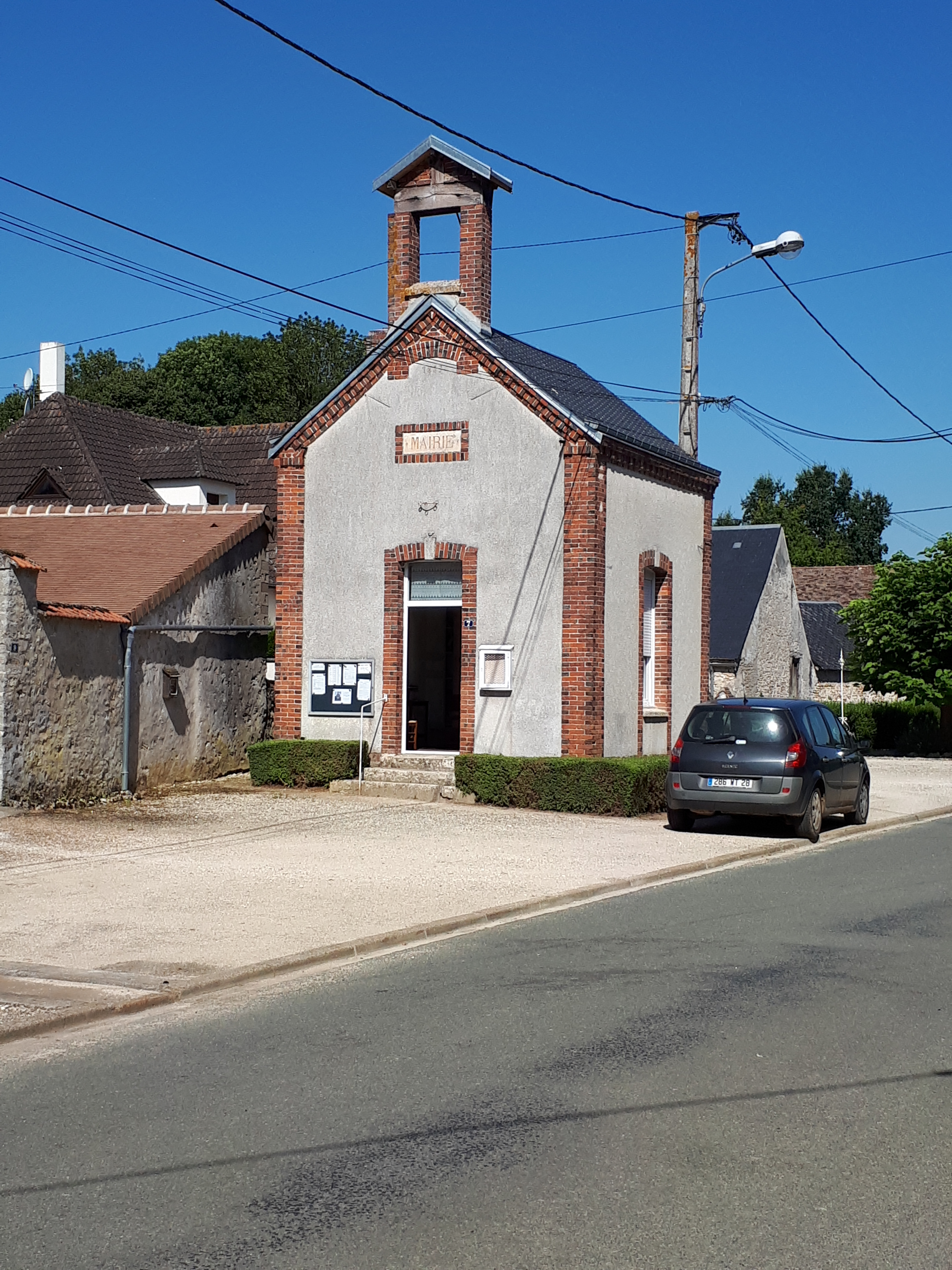
- The town hall in Morainville
- Location of Morainville
- Location within France Location within Centre-Val de Loire
- Coordinates: 48°22′50″N 1°49′43″E
- Country: France
- Region: Centre-Val de Loire
- Department: Eure-et-Loir
- Arrondissement: Chartres
- Canton: Auneau

Government
  - Mayor (2020–2026): Bertrand de Miscault
- Area^{1}: 3.82 km^{2} (1.47 sq mi)
- Elevation: 148 m (486 ft)
- Highest elevation: 152 m (499 ft)
- Lowest elevation: 146 m (479 ft)
- Population (2023): 18
  - Density: 4.7/km^{2} (12/sq mi)
- Time zone: UTC+01:00 (CET)
  - Summer (DST): UTC+02:00 (CEST)
- INSEE/Postal code: 28268 /28700
- ^{1} French Land Register data, which excludes lakes, ponds, glaciers > 1 km^{2} (0.386 sq mi or 247 acres) and river estuaries.

Morainville (French pronunciation: [mɔʁɛ̃vil]) is a commune in the Eure-et-Loir department in northern France.

== Population ==
Historical population
Year	Pop.	±% p.a.
1968	48	—
1975	43	−1.56%
1982	37	−2.12%
1990	25	−4.78%
1999	28	+1.27%
2007	25	−1.41%
2012	27	+1.55%
2017	22	−4.01%
2023	18	−3.29%
Source: INSEE

== See also ==
- Communes of the Eure-et-Loir department
