= Moinville-la-Jeulin =

- Commune
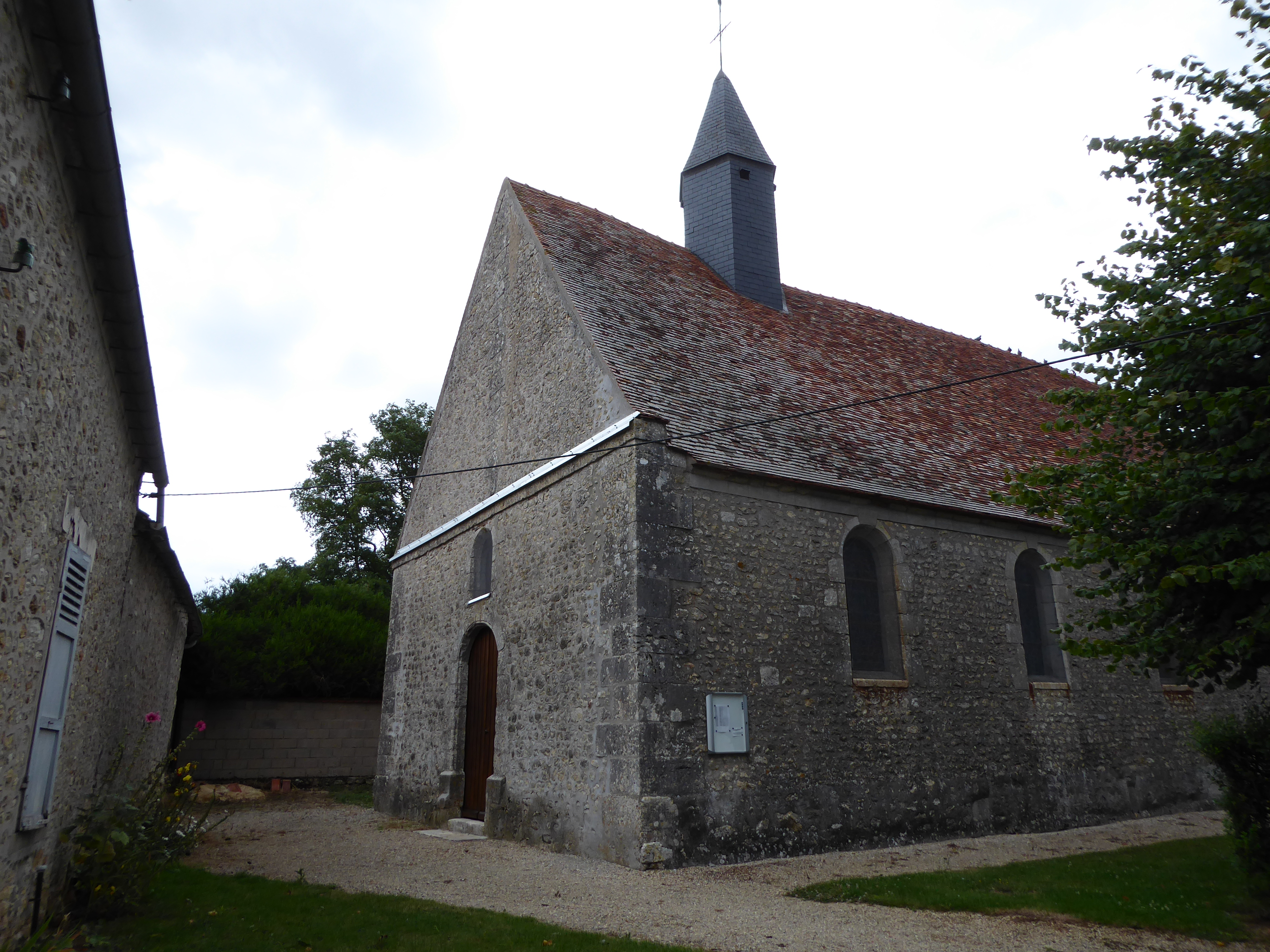
- The church in Moinville-la-Jeulin
- Location of Moinville-la-Jeulin
- Location within France Location within Centre-Val de Loire
- Coordinates: 48°22′50″N 1°42′04″E
- Country: France
- Region: Centre-Val de Loire
- Department: Eure-et-Loir
- Arrondissement: Chartres
- Canton: Auneau
- Intercommunality: CA Chartres Métropole

Government
  - Mayor (2020–2026): Kamel El Hamdi
- Area^{1}: 6.05 km^{2} (2.34 sq mi)
- Elevation: 140 m (460 ft)
- Highest elevation: 154 m (505 ft)
- Lowest elevation: 137 m (449 ft)
- Population (2023): 159
  - Density: 26.3/km^{2} (68.1/sq mi)
- Time zone: UTC+01:00 (CET)
  - Summer (DST): UTC+02:00 (CEST)
- INSEE/Postal code: 28255 /28700
- ^{1} French Land Register data, which excludes lakes, ponds, glaciers > 1 km^{2} (0.386 sq mi or 247 acres) and river estuaries.

Moinville-la-Jeulin (French pronunciation: [mwɛ̃vil la ʒølɛ̃]) is a commune in the Eure-et-Loir department in northern France.

== Population ==
Historical population
Year	Pop.	±% p.a.
1968	92	—
1975	94	+0.31%
1982	88	−0.94%
1990	107	+2.47%
1999	98	−0.97%
2007	104	+0.75%
2012	135	+5.36%
2017	170	+4.72%
2023	159	−1.11%
Source: INSEE

== See also ==
- Communes of the Eure-et-Loir department
