= Écrosnes =

- Commune
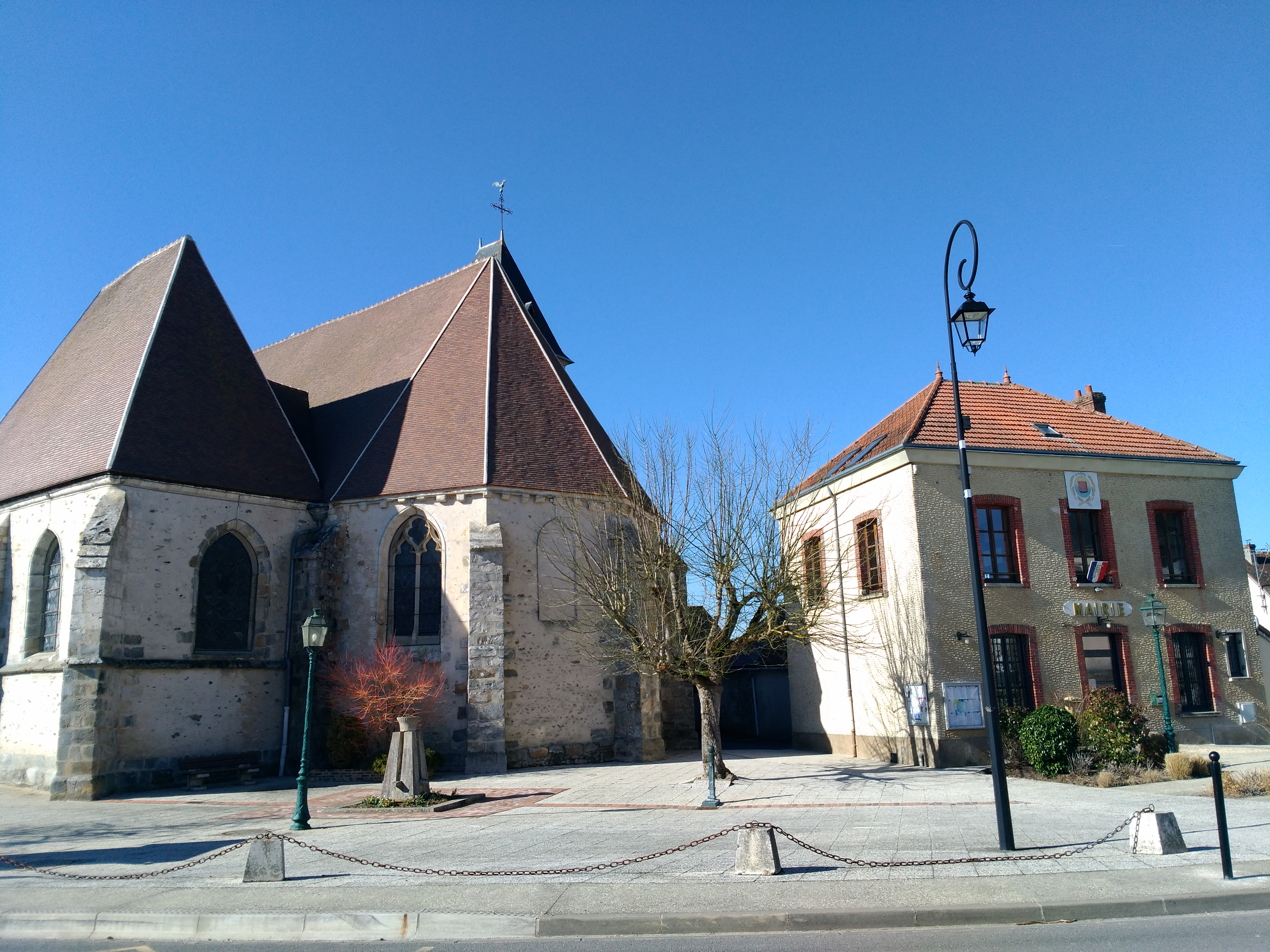
- The town hall in Écrosnes

- Coat of arms
- Location of Écrosnes
- Location within France Location within Centre-Val de Loire
- Coordinates: 48°32′45″N 1°43′42″E
- Country: France
- Region: Centre-Val de Loire
- Department: Eure-et-Loir
- Arrondissement: Chartres
- Canton: Auneau

Government
  - Mayor (2020–2026): Annie Camuel
- Area^{1}: 23.27 km^{2} (8.98 sq mi)
- Elevation: 150 m (490 ft)
- Highest elevation: 166 m (545 ft)
- Lowest elevation: 127 m (417 ft)
- Population (2023): 869
  - Density: 37.3/km^{2} (96.7/sq mi)
- Time zone: UTC+01:00 (CET)
  - Summer (DST): UTC+02:00 (CEST)
- INSEE/Postal code: 28137 /28320
- ^{1} French Land Register data, which excludes lakes, ponds, glaciers > 1 km^{2} (0.386 sq mi or 247 acres) and river estuaries.

Écrosnes (French pronunciation: [ekʁon]) is a commune in the Eure-et-Loir department in northern France.

== Population ==
Historical population
Year	Pop.	±% p.a.
1968	421	—
1975	461	+1.31%
1982	563	+2.90%
1990	719	+3.10%
1999	742	+0.35%
2007	772	+0.50%
2012	823	+1.29%
2017	855	+0.77%
2023	869	+0.27%
Source: INSEE

== See also ==
- Communes of the Eure-et-Loir department
