= La Chapelle-d'Aunainville =

- Commune
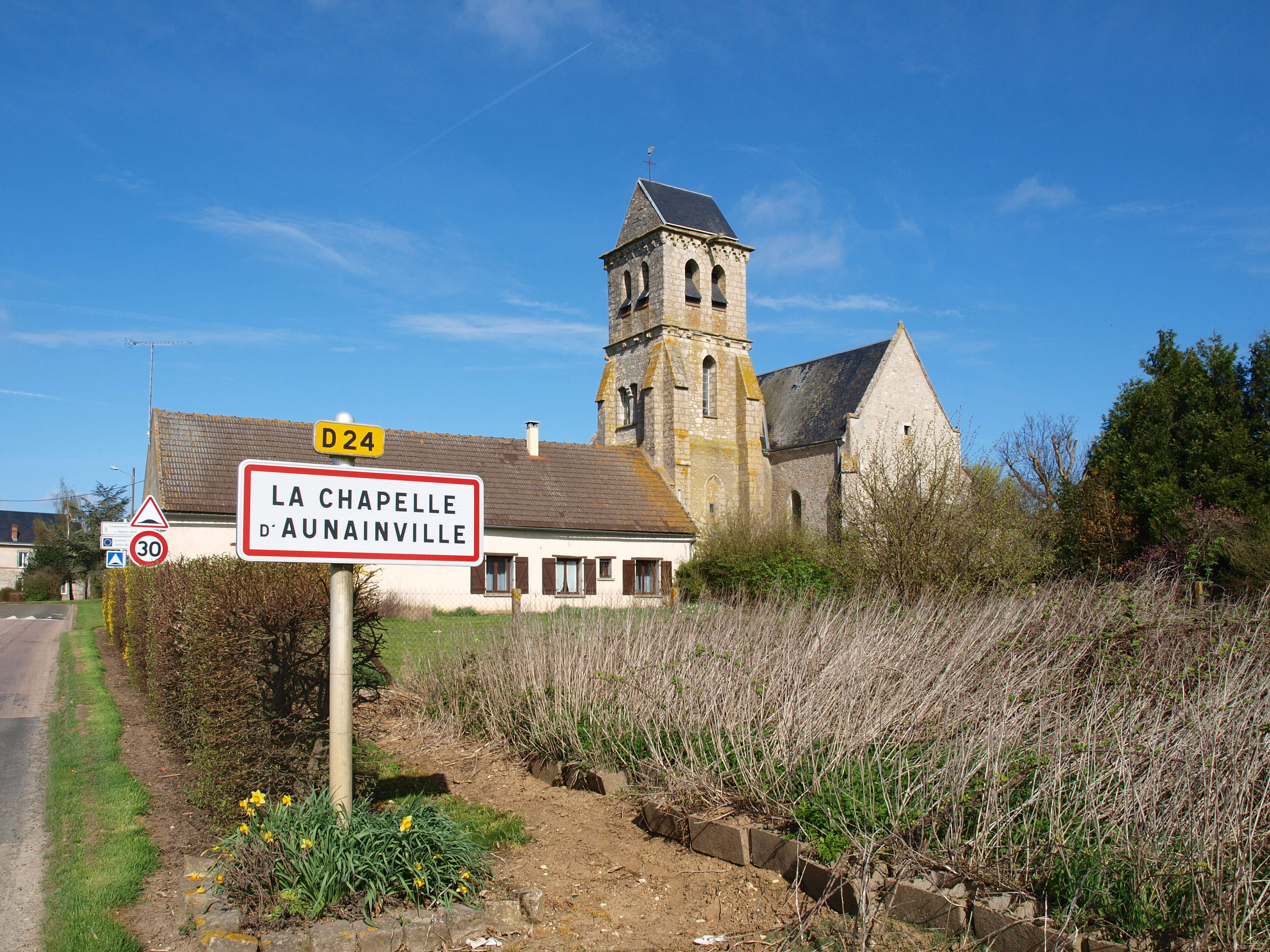
- The church in La Chapelle-d'Aunainville
- Location of La Chapelle-d'Aunainville
- Location within France Location within Centre-Val de Loire
- Coordinates: 48°25′30″N 1°48′54″E
- Country: France
- Region: Centre-Val de Loire
- Department: Eure-et-Loir
- Arrondissement: Chartres
- Canton: Auneau

Government
  - Mayor (2020–2026): Nicolas Pelletier
- Area^{1}: 7.5 km^{2} (2.9 sq mi)
- Elevation: 152 m (499 ft)
- Highest elevation: 156 m (512 ft)
- Lowest elevation: 138 m (453 ft)
- Population (2023): 239
  - Density: 32/km^{2} (83/sq mi)
- Time zone: UTC+01:00 (CET)
  - Summer (DST): UTC+02:00 (CEST)
- INSEE/Postal code: 28074 /28700
- ^{1} French Land Register data, which excludes lakes, ponds, glaciers > 1 km^{2} (0.386 sq mi or 247 acres) and river estuaries.

La Chapelle-d'Aunainville (French pronunciation: [la ʃapɛl donɛ̃vil]) is a commune in the Eure-et-Loir department in northern France.

== Population ==
Historical population
Year	Pop.	±% p.a.
1968	146	—
1975	120	−2.76%
1982	144	+2.64%
1990	188	+3.39%
1999	263	+3.80%
2007	247	−0.78%
2012	312	+4.78%
2017	274	−2.56%
2023	239	−2.25%
Source: INSEE

== See also ==
- Communes of the Eure-et-Loir department
