= Voise =

- Commune
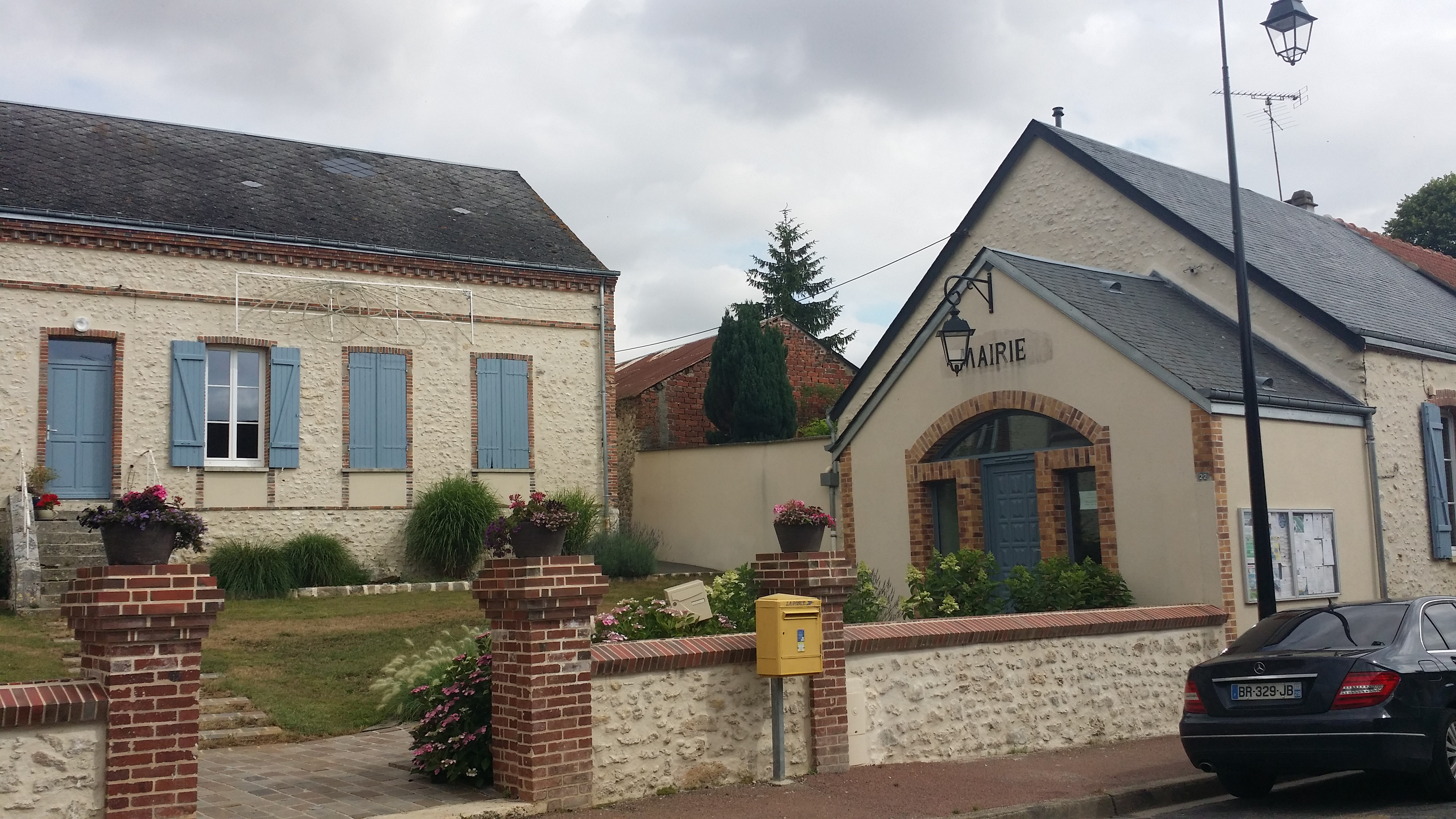
- The town hall in Voise
- Location of Voise
- Location within France Location within Centre-Val de Loire
- Coordinates: 48°24′03″N 1°42′28″E
- Country: France
- Region: Centre-Val de Loire
- Department: Eure-et-Loir
- Arrondissement: Chartres
- Canton: Auneau
- Intercommunality: Chartres Métropole

Government
  - Mayor (2020–2026): Mylène Pichard
- Area^{1}: 10.39 km^{2} (4.01 sq mi)
- Elevation: 52 m (171 ft)
- Highest elevation: 154 m (505 ft)
- Lowest elevation: 128 m (420 ft)
- Population (2023): 245
  - Density: 23.6/km^{2} (61.1/sq mi)
- Time zone: UTC+01:00 (CET)
  - Summer (DST): UTC+02:00 (CEST)
- INSEE/Postal code: 28421 /28700
- ^{1} French Land Register data, which excludes lakes, ponds, glaciers > 1 km^{2} (0.386 sq mi or 247 acres) and river estuaries.

Voise (French pronunciation: [vwaz]) is a commune in the Eure-et-Loir department in northern France.

== Population ==
Historical population
Year	Pop.	±% p.a.
1968	200	—
1975	209	+0.63%
1982	188	−1.50%
1990	231	+2.61%
1999	249	+0.84%
2007	271	+1.06%
2012	289	+1.29%
2017	282	−0.49%
2023	245	−2.32%
Source: INSEE

== See also ==
- Communes of the Eure-et-Loir department
