= Levainville =

- Commune
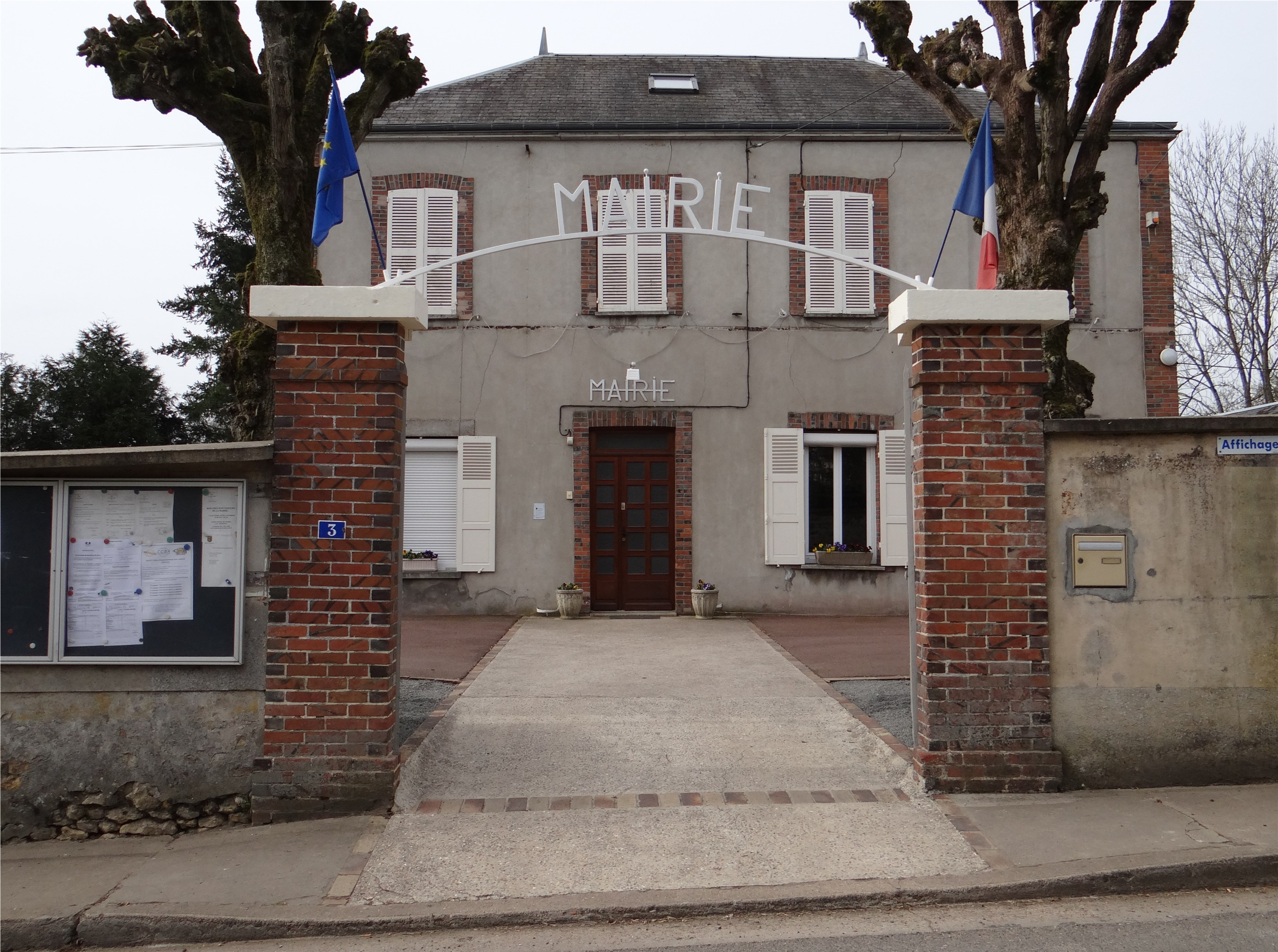
- The town hall in Levainville

- Coat of arms
- Location of Levainville
- Location within France Location within Centre-Val de Loire
- Coordinates: 48°29′23″N 1°44′36″E
- Country: France
- Region: Centre-Val de Loire
- Department: Eure-et-Loir
- Arrondissement: Chartres
- Canton: Auneau
- Intercommunality: CC des Portes Euréliennes d'Île-de-France

Government
  - Mayor (2020–2026): Michel Darrivère
- Area^{1}: 5.55 km^{2} (2.14 sq mi)
- Elevation: 130 m (430 ft)
- Highest elevation: 156 m (512 ft)
- Lowest elevation: 117 m (384 ft)
- Population (2023): 379
  - Density: 68.3/km^{2} (177/sq mi)
- Time zone: UTC+01:00 (CET)
  - Summer (DST): UTC+02:00 (CEST)
- INSEE/Postal code: 28208 /28700
- ^{1} French Land Register data, which excludes lakes, ponds, glaciers > 1 km^{2} (0.386 sq mi or 247 acres) and river estuaries.

Levainville (French pronunciation: [ləvɛ̃vil]) is a commune in the Eure-et-Loir department and Centre-Val de Loire region of north-central France. It lies 19 km east of Chartres and some 60 km south-west of Paris.

== Population ==
Historical population
Year	Pop.	±% p.a.
1968	158	—
1975	172	+1.22%
1982	202	+2.32%
1990	264	+3.40%
1999	292	+1.13%
2007	360	+2.65%
2012	404	+2.33%
2017	389	−0.75%
2023	379	−0.43%
Source: INSEE

== See also ==
- Communes of the Eure-et-Loir department
