= Ardelu =

- Commune
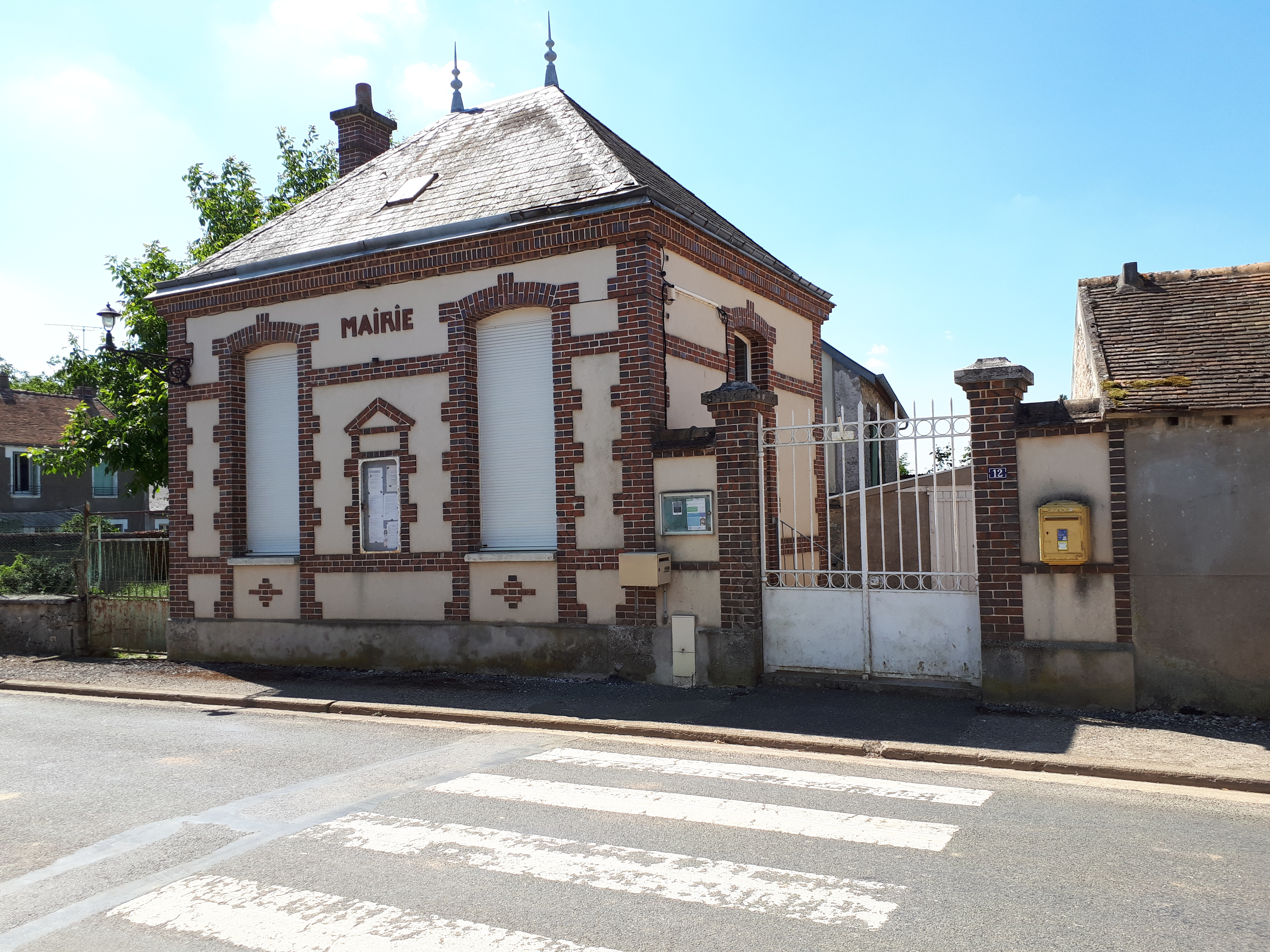
- The town hall in Ardelu
- Location of Ardelu
- Location within France Location within Centre-Val de Loire
- Coordinates: 48°21′14″N 1°54′45″E
- Country: France
- Region: Centre-Val de Loire
- Department: Eure-et-Loir
- Arrondissement: Chartres
- Canton: Auneau

Government
  - Mayor (2020–2026): François-Cyril Raclin
- Area^{1}: 4.07 km^{2} (1.57 sq mi)
- Elevation: 146 m (479 ft)
- Highest elevation: 151 m (495 ft)
- Lowest elevation: 142 m (466 ft)
- Population (2023): 72
  - Density: 18/km^{2} (46/sq mi)
- Time zone: UTC+01:00 (CET)
  - Summer (DST): UTC+02:00 (CEST)
- INSEE/Postal code: 28009 /28700
- ^{1} French Land Register data, which excludes lakes, ponds, glaciers > 1 km^{2} (0.386 sq mi or 247 acres) and river estuaries.

Ardelu (French pronunciation: [aʁdəly]) is a commune in the Eure-et-Loir department in northern France.

== Population ==
Historical population
Year	Pop.	±% p.a.
1968	50	—
1975	58	+2.14%
1982	49	−2.38%
1990	69	+4.37%
1999	78	+1.37%
2007	74	−0.66%
2012	76	+0.53%
2017	73	−0.80%
2023	72	−0.23%
Source: INSEE

== See also ==
- Communes of the Eure-et-Loir department
