= Vierville, Eure-et-Loir =

Vierville
- Commune
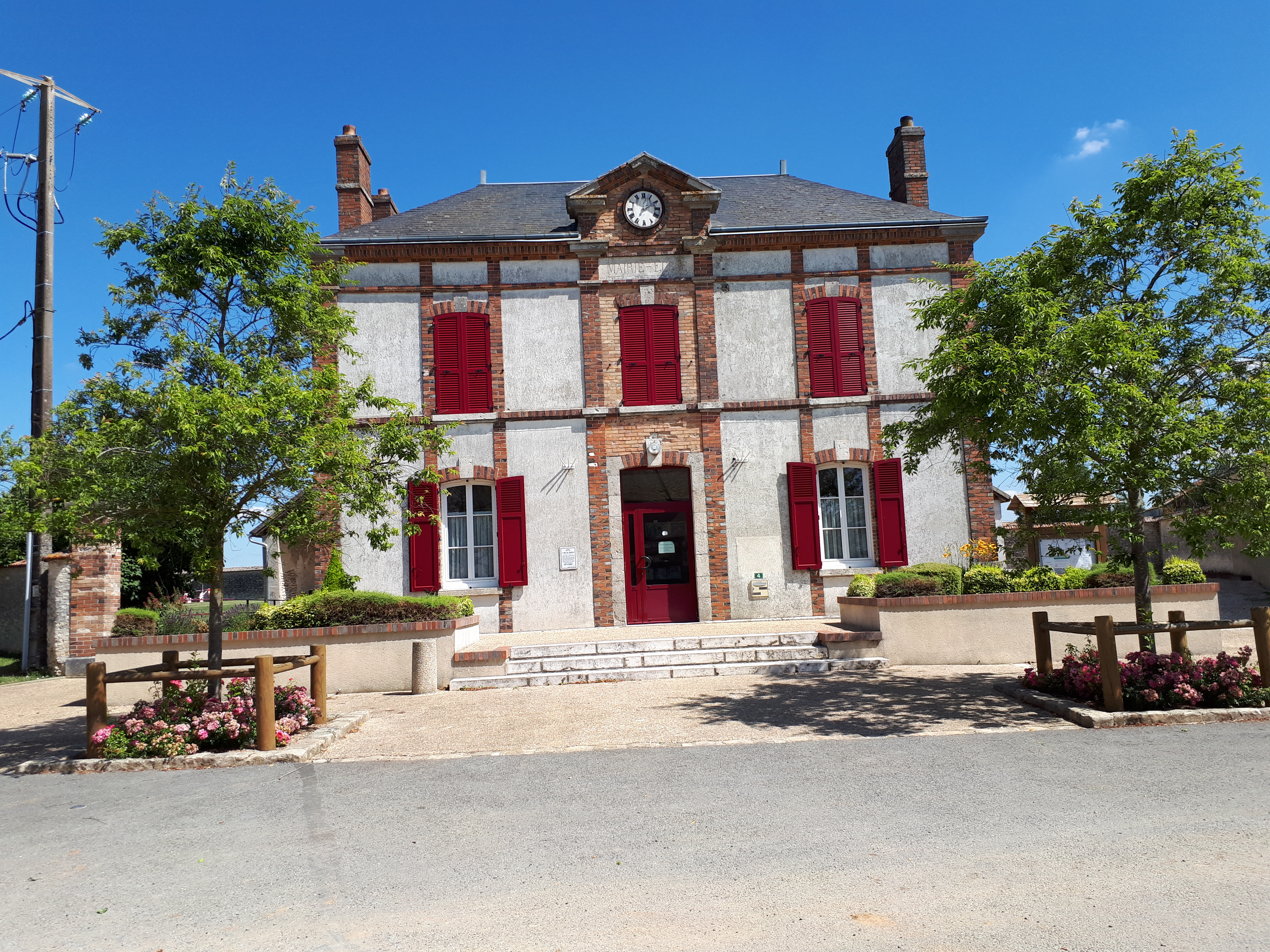
- The town hall in Vierville
- Location of Vierville
- Location within France Location within Centre-Val de Loire
- Coordinates: 48°22′27″N 1°54′15″E
- Country: France
- Region: Centre-Val de Loire
- Department: Eure-et-Loir
- Arrondissement: Chartres
- Canton: Auneau
- Intercommunality: CC des Portes Euréliennes d'Île-de-France

Government
  - Mayor (2020–2026): Serge Milochau
- Area^{1}: 6.81 km^{2} (2.63 sq mi)
- Elevation: 150 m (490 ft)
- Highest elevation: 156 m (512 ft)
- Lowest elevation: 144 m (472 ft)
- Population (2023): 107
  - Density: 15.7/km^{2} (40.7/sq mi)
- Time zone: UTC+01:00 (CET)
  - Summer (DST): UTC+02:00 (CEST)
- INSEE/Postal code: 28408 /28700
- ^{1} French Land Register data, which excludes lakes, ponds, glaciers > 1 km^{2} (0.386 sq mi or 247 acres) and river estuaries.

Vierville (French pronunciation: [vjɛʁvil]) is a commune in the Eure-et-Loir department and Centre-Val de Loire region of north-central France. It lies 32 km east of Chartres and some 60 km south-west of Paris.

== Population ==
Historical population
Year	Pop.	±% p.a.
1968	99	—
1975	100	+0.14%
1982	76	−3.84%
1990	97	+3.10%
1999	84	−1.59%
2007	118	+4.34%
2012	132	+2.27%
2017	132	+0.00%
2023	107	−3.44%
Source: INSEE

== See also ==
- Communes of the Eure-et-Loir department
