= Marchéville =

- Commune
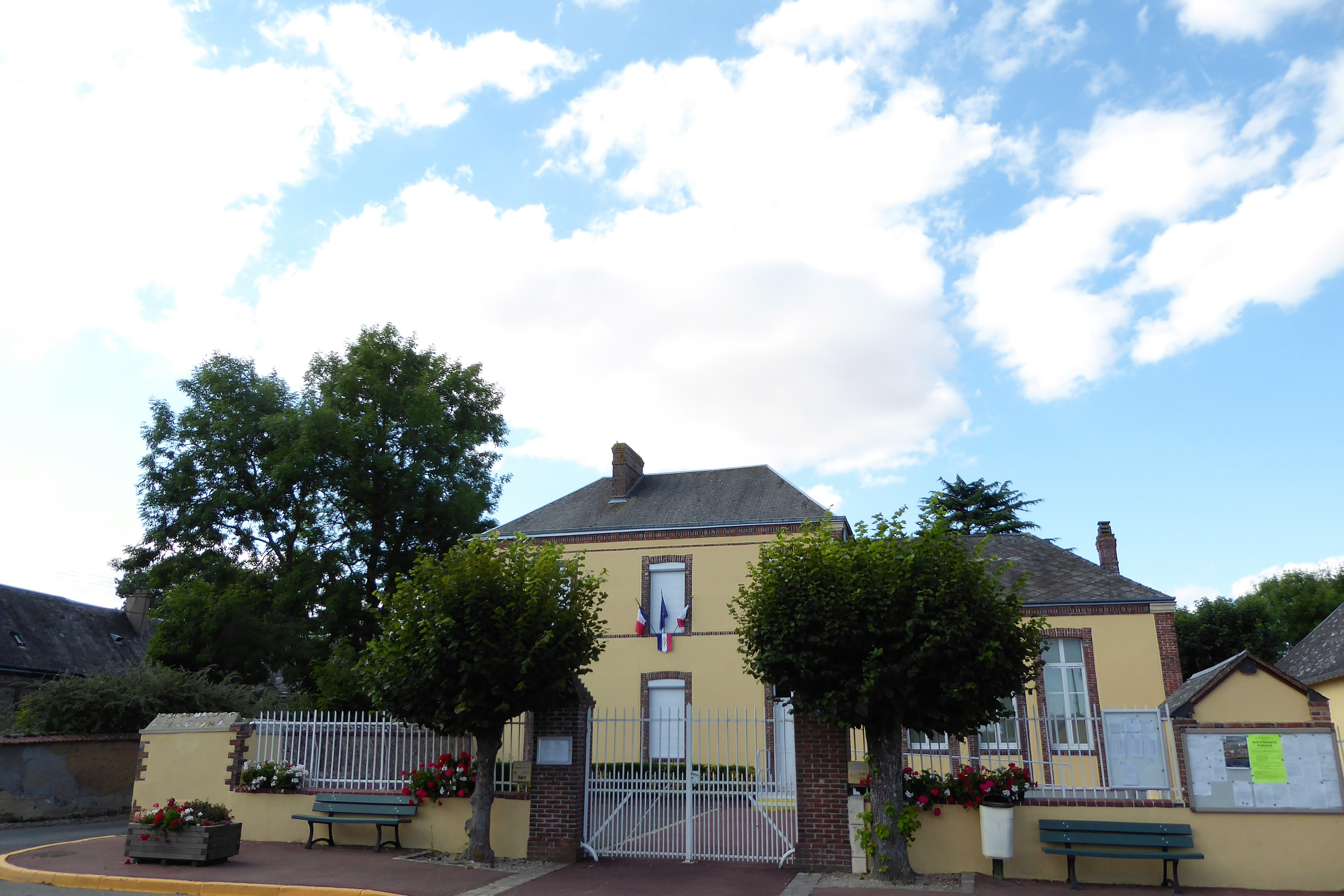
- The town hall in Marchéville

- Coat of arms
- Location of Marchéville
- Location within France Location within Centre-Val de Loire
- Coordinates: 48°22′06″N 1°15′11″E
- Country: France
- Region: Centre-Val de Loire
- Department: Eure-et-Loir
- Arrondissement: Chartres
- Canton: Illiers-Combray

Government
  - Mayor (2020–2026): Patrick Lage
- Area^{1}: 12.38 km^{2} (4.78 sq mi)
- Elevation: 193 m (633 ft)
- Highest elevation: 207 m (679 ft)
- Lowest elevation: 163 m (535 ft)
- Population (2023): 507
  - Density: 41.0/km^{2} (106/sq mi)
- Time zone: UTC+01:00 (CET)
  - Summer (DST): UTC+02:00 (CEST)
- INSEE/Postal code: 28234 /28120
- ^{1} French Land Register data, which excludes lakes, ponds, glaciers > 1 km^{2} (0.386 sq mi or 247 acres) and river estuaries.

Marchéville (French pronunciation: [maʁʃevil]) is a commune in the Eure-et-Loir department in northern France.

== Population ==
Historical population
Year	Pop.	±% p.a.
1968	324	—
1975	310	−0.63%
1982	303	−0.33%
1990	379	+2.84%
1999	426	+1.31%
2007	448	+0.63%
2012	527	+3.30%
2017	479	−1.89%
2023	507	+0.95%
Source: INSEE

== See also ==
- Communes of the Eure-et-Loir department
