= Sainville =

- Commune
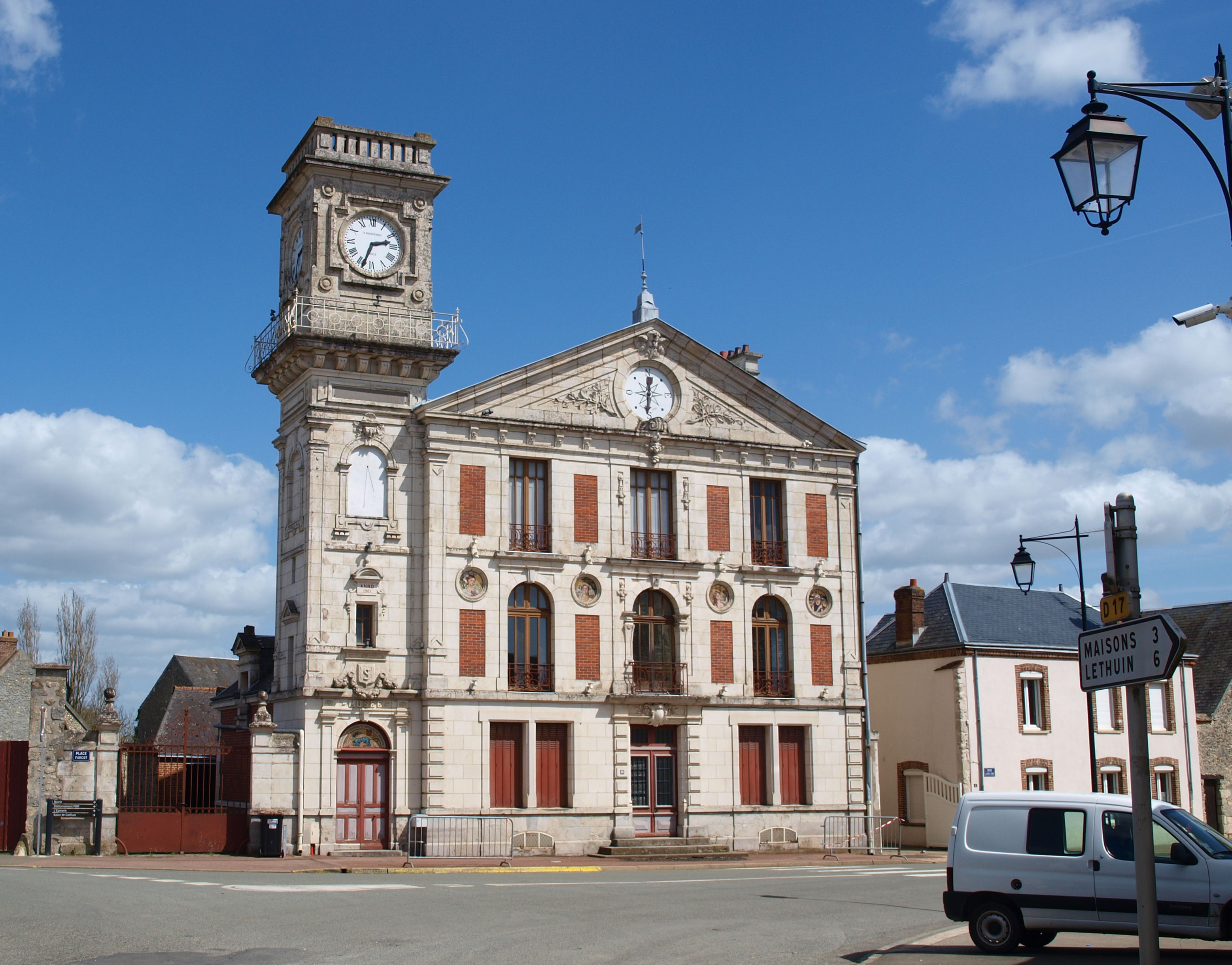
- Farcot museum
- Location of Sainville
- Location within France Location within Centre-Val de Loire
- Coordinates: 48°24′58″N 1°52′50″E
- Country: France
- Region: Centre-Val de Loire
- Department: Eure-et-Loir
- Arrondissement: Chartres
- Canton: Auneau

Government
  - Mayor (2020–2026): Jean-Marc Dupré
- Area^{1}: 21.87 km^{2} (8.44 sq mi)
- Elevation: 154 m (505 ft)
- Highest elevation: 161 m (528 ft)
- Lowest elevation: 137 m (449 ft)
- Population (2023): 1,046
  - Density: 47.83/km^{2} (123.9/sq mi)
- Time zone: UTC+01:00 (CET)
  - Summer (DST): UTC+02:00 (CEST)
- INSEE/Postal code: 28363 /28700
- ^{1} French Land Register data, which excludes lakes, ponds, glaciers > 1 km^{2} (0.386 sq mi or 247 acres) and river estuaries.

Sainville (French pronunciation: [sɛ̃vil]) is a commune in the Eure-et-Loir department in northern France.

== Population ==
Historical population
Year	Pop.	±% p.a.
1968	584	—
1975	592	+0.19%
1982	627	+0.82%
1990	895	+4.55%
1999	942	+0.57%
2007	942	+0.00%
2012	992	+1.04%
2017	1,012	+0.40%
2023	1,046	+0.55%
Source: INSEE

== Notable residents ==
- Eugène Farcot (1830-1896), clockmaker and aeronautical engineer born in this town. A museum and the central square in Sainville bear his name.

== See also ==
- Communes of the Eure-et-Loir department
