= Garancières-en-Beauce =

- Commune
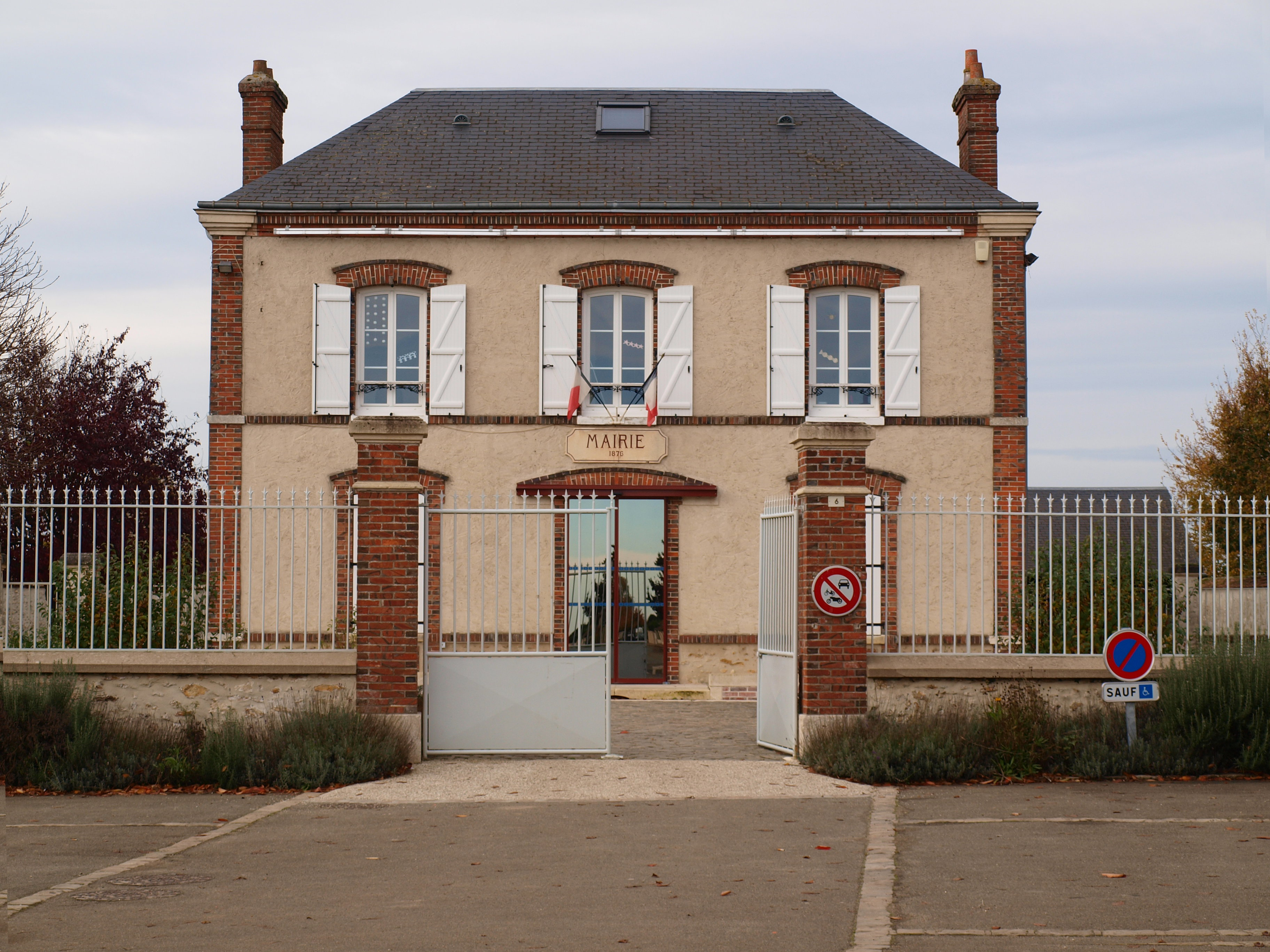
- The town hall in Garancières-en-Beauce
- Location of Garancières-en-Beauce
- Location within France Location within Centre-Val de Loire
- Coordinates: 48°26′13″N 1°55′16″E
- Country: France
- Region: Centre-Val de Loire
- Department: Eure-et-Loir
- Arrondissement: Chartres
- Canton: Auneau

Government
  - Mayor (2020–2026): Laurent Clementoni
- Area^{1}: 11.26 km^{2} (4.35 sq mi)
- Elevation: 150 m (490 ft)
- Highest elevation: 157 m (515 ft)
- Lowest elevation: 147 m (482 ft)
- Population (2023): 238
  - Density: 21.1/km^{2} (54.7/sq mi)
- Time zone: UTC+01:00 (CET)
  - Summer (DST): UTC+02:00 (CEST)
- INSEE/Postal code: 28169 /28700
- ^{1} French Land Register data, which excludes lakes, ponds, glaciers > 1 km^{2} (0.386 sq mi or 247 acres) and river estuaries.

Garancières-en-Beauce (French pronunciation: [ɡaʁɑ̃sjɛʁ ɑ̃ bos], literally Garancières in Beauce) is a commune in the Eure-et-Loir department in northern France.

== Population ==
Historical population
| Year | Pop. | ±% p.a. |
|---|---|---|
| 1968 | 190 | — |
| 1975 | 170 | −1.58% |
| 1982 | 198 | +2.20% |
| 1990 | 222 | +1.44% |
| 1999 | 230 | +0.39% |
| 2007 | 223 | −0.39% |
| 2012 | 231 | +0.71% |
| 2017 | 219 | −1.06% |
| 2023 | 238 | +1.40% |
Source: INSEE

== See also ==
- Communes of the Eure-et-Loir department
