= Houville-la-Branche =

- Commune
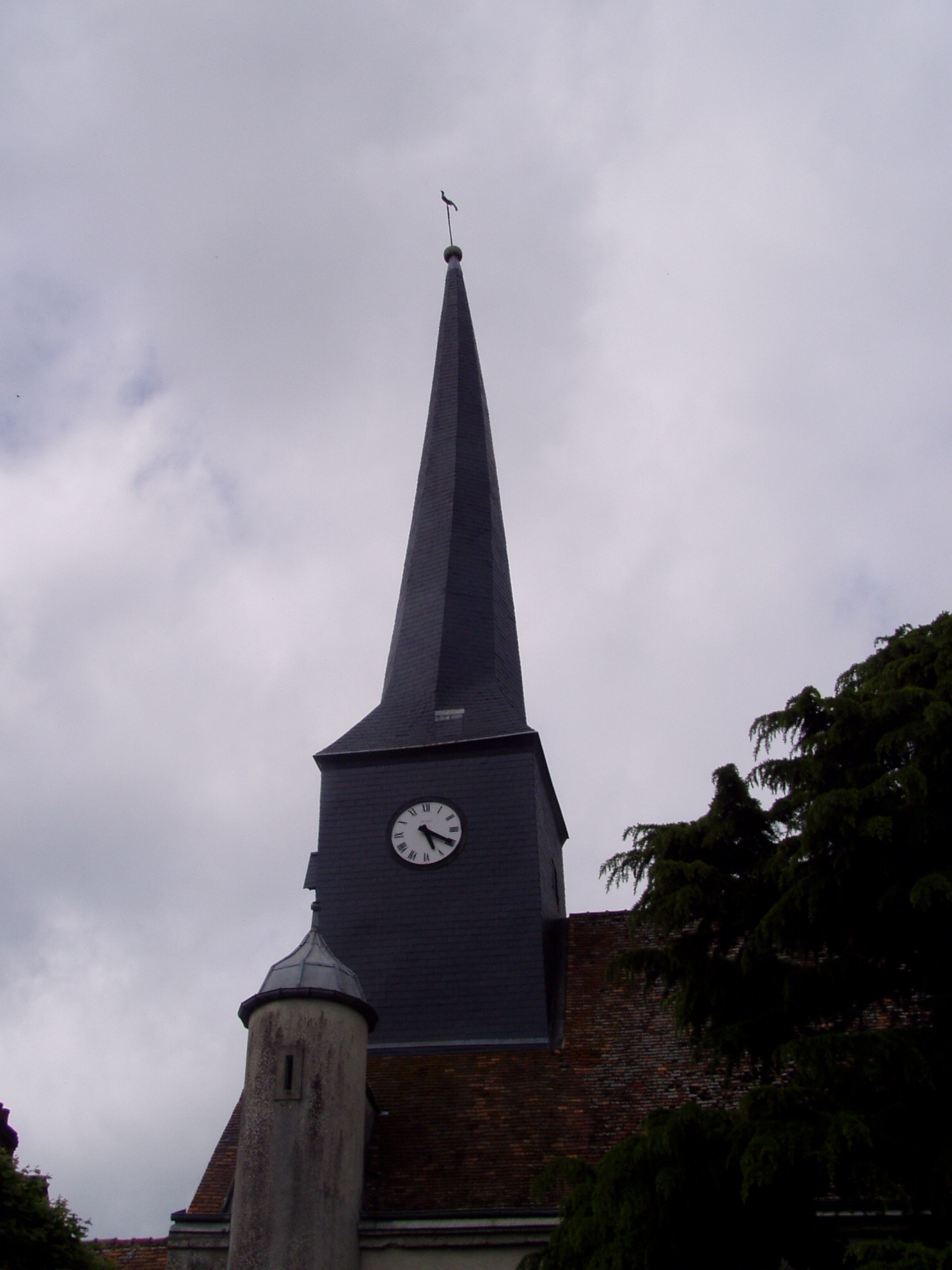
- The church in Houville
- Location of Houville-la-Branche
- Location within France Location within Centre-Val de Loire
- Coordinates: 48°26′38″N 1°38′33″E
- Country: France
- Region: Centre-Val de Loire
- Department: Eure-et-Loir
- Arrondissement: Chartres
- Canton: Auneau
- Intercommunality: CA Chartres Métropole

Government
  - Mayor (2020–2026): Dominique Pétillon
- Area^{1}: 13.88 km^{2} (5.36 sq mi)
- Elevation: 157 m (515 ft)
- Highest elevation: 159 m (522 ft)
- Lowest elevation: 139 m (456 ft)
- Population (2023): 420
  - Density: 30/km^{2} (78/sq mi)
- Time zone: UTC+01:00 (CET)
  - Summer (DST): UTC+02:00 (CEST)
- INSEE/Postal code: 28194 /28700
- ^{1} French Land Register data, which excludes lakes, ponds, glaciers > 1 km^{2} (0.386 sq mi or 247 acres) and river estuaries.

Houville-la-Branche (French pronunciation: [uvil la bʁɑ̃ʃ]) is a commune in the Eure-et-Loir department in northern France.

== Population ==
Historical population
Year	Pop.	±% p.a.
1968	307	—
1975	316	+0.41%
1982	332	+0.71%
1990	332	+0.00%
1999	450	+3.44%
2007	481	+0.84%
2012	469	−0.50%
2017	424	−2.00%
2023	420	−0.16%
Source: INSEE

== See also ==
- Communes of the Eure-et-Loir department
