= Roinville, Eure-et-Loir =

Roinville
- Commune
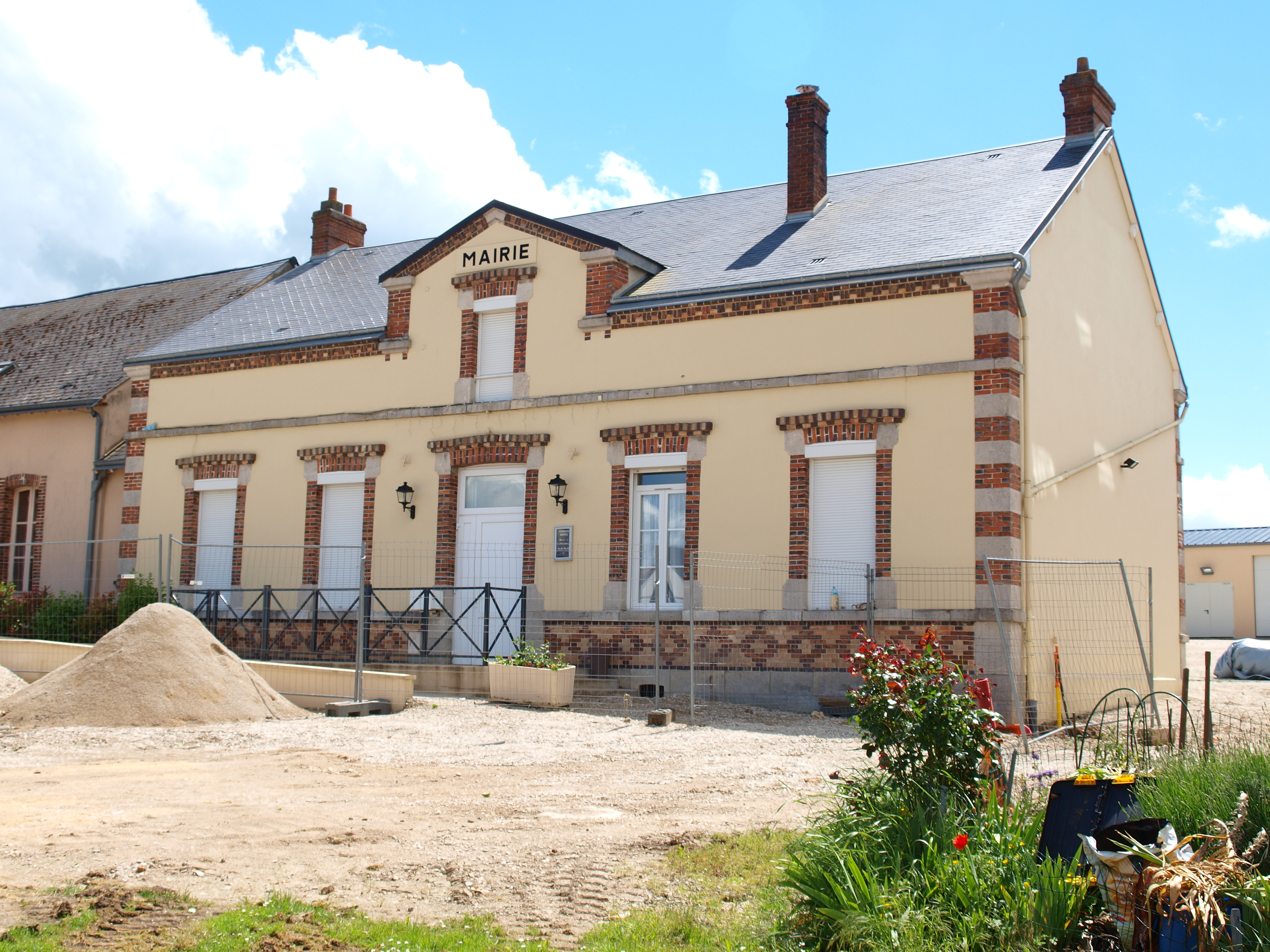
- The town hall in Roinville
- Location of Roinville
- Location within France Location within Centre-Val de Loire
- Coordinates: 48°26′46″N 1°44′57″E
- Country: France
- Region: Centre-Val de Loire
- Department: Eure-et-Loir
- Arrondissement: Chartres
- Canton: Auneau
- Intercommunality: CA Chartres Métropole

Government
  - Mayor (2021–2026): Cédric Tabut
- Area^{1}: 6.83 km^{2} (2.64 sq mi)
- Elevation: 130 m (430 ft)
- Highest elevation: 156 m (512 ft)
- Lowest elevation: 123 m (404 ft)
- Population (2023): 588
  - Density: 86.1/km^{2} (223/sq mi)
- Time zone: UTC+01:00 (CET)
  - Summer (DST): UTC+02:00 (CEST)
- INSEE/Postal code: 28317 /28700
- ^{1} French Land Register data, which excludes lakes, ponds, glaciers > 1 km^{2} (0.386 sq mi or 247 acres) and river estuaries.

Roinville (French pronunciation: [ʁwɛ̃vil]) is a commune in the Eure-et-Loir department in northern France.

== Population ==
Historical population
Year	Pop.	±% p.a.
1968	276	—
1975	300	+1.20%
1982	317	+0.79%
1990	338	+0.81%
1999	349	+0.36%
2007	355	+0.21%
2012	468	+5.68%
2017	561	+3.69%
2023	588	+0.79%
Source: INSEE

== See also ==
- Communes of the Eure-et-Loir department
