= Ymeray =

- Commune
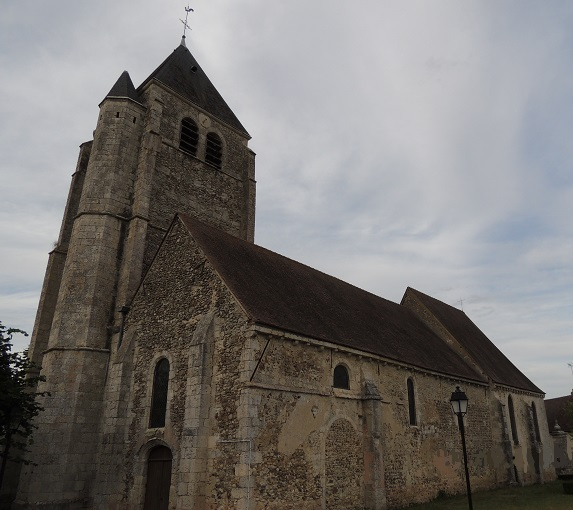
- The church in Ymeray
- Location of Ymeray
- Location within France Location within Centre-Val de Loire
- Coordinates: 48°30′36″N 1°41′49″E
- Country: France
- Region: Centre-Val de Loire
- Department: Eure-et-Loir
- Arrondissement: Chartres
- Canton: Auneau
- Intercommunality: Portes Euréliennes d'Île-de-France

Government
  - Mayor (2020–2026): Jocelyne Petit
- Area^{1}: 6.85 km^{2} (2.64 sq mi)
- Elevation: 120 m (390 ft)
- Highest elevation: 164 m (538 ft)
- Lowest elevation: 111 m (364 ft)
- Population (2023): 615
  - Density: 89.8/km^{2} (233/sq mi)
- Time zone: UTC+01:00 (CET)
  - Summer (DST): UTC+02:00 (CEST)
- INSEE/Postal code: 28425 /28320
- ^{1} French Land Register data, which excludes lakes, ponds, glaciers > 1 km^{2} (0.386 sq mi or 247 acres) and river estuaries.

Ymeray (French pronunciation: [imʁɛ]) is a commune in the Eure-et-Loir department and Centre-Val de Loire region of north-central France. It lies 17 km east-north-east of Chartres and some 60 km south-west of Paris.

== Population ==
Historical population
Year	Pop.	±% p.a.
1968	292	—
1975	352	+2.71%
1982	416	+2.42%
1990	469	+1.51%
1999	503	+0.78%
2007	583	+1.86%
2012	622	+1.30%
2017	612	−0.32%
2023	615	+0.08%
Source: INSEE

== See also ==
- Communes of the Eure-et-Loir department
