= Le Gué-de-Longroi =

- Commune
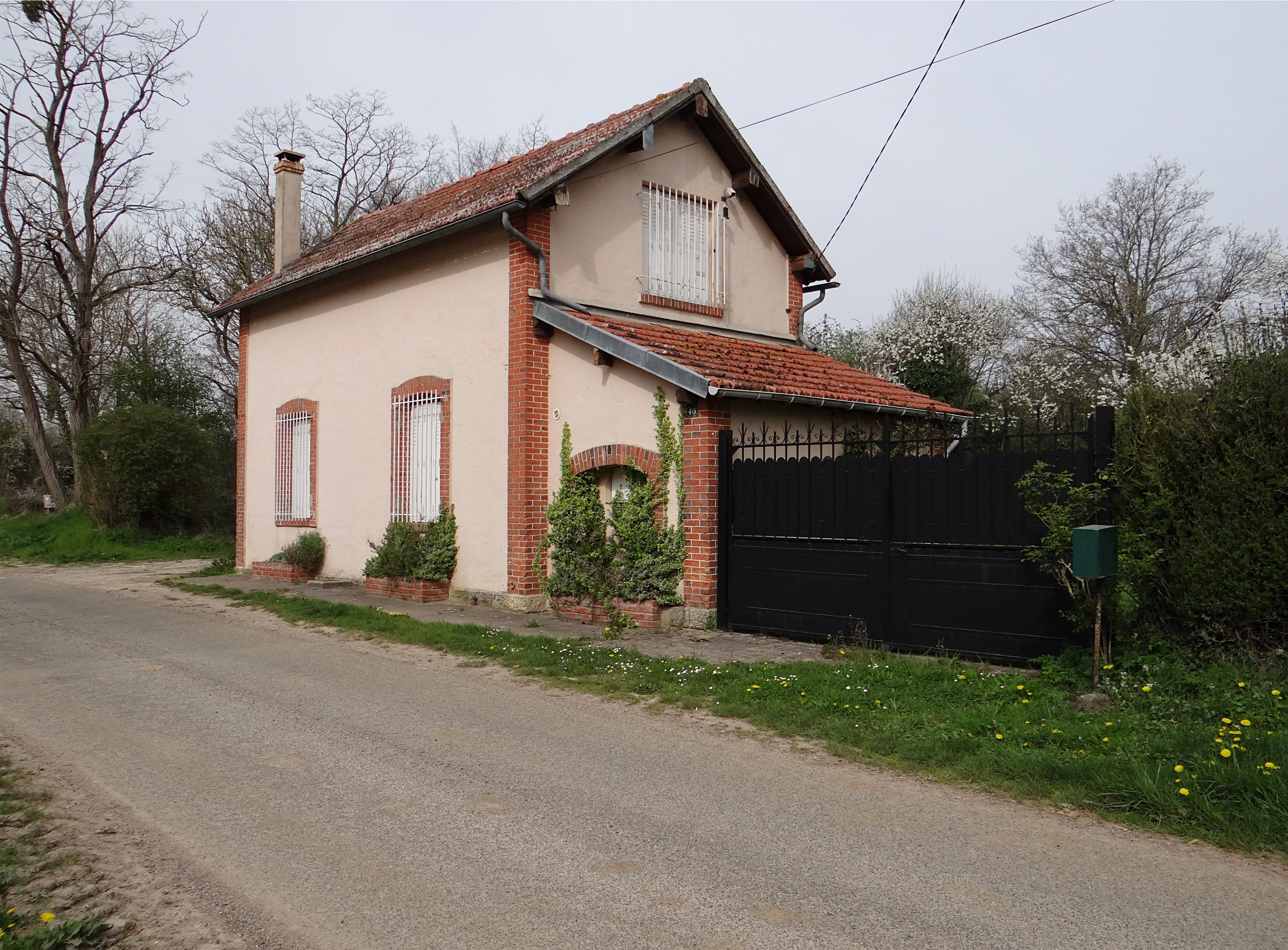
- The former railway station in Le Gué-de-Longroi

- Coat of arms
- Location of Le Gué-de-Longroi
- Location within France Location within Centre-Val de Loire
- Coordinates: 48°30′06″N 1°43′14″E
- Country: France
- Region: Centre-Val de Loire
- Department: Eure-et-Loir
- Arrondissement: Chartres
- Canton: Auneau

Government
  - Mayor (2020–2026): Pascal Boucher
- Area^{1}: 6.9 km^{2} (2.7 sq mi)
- Elevation: 1,251 m (4,104 ft)
- Highest elevation: 161 m (528 ft)
- Lowest elevation: 115 m (377 ft)
- Population (2023): 860
  - Density: 120/km^{2} (320/sq mi)
- Time zone: UTC+01:00 (CET)
  - Summer (DST): UTC+02:00 (CEST)
- INSEE/Postal code: 28188 /28700
- ^{1} French Land Register data, which excludes lakes, ponds, glaciers > 1 km^{2} (0.386 sq mi or 247 acres) and river estuaries.

Le Gué-de-Longroi (French pronunciation: [lə ɡe də lɔ̃ɡʁwa]) is a commune in the Eure-et-Loir department in northern France.

== Population ==
Historical population
Year	Pop.	±% p.a.
1968	318	—
1975	354	+1.54%
1982	461	+3.84%
1990	733	+5.97%
1999	718	−0.23%
2007	750	+0.55%
2012	909	+3.92%
2017	945	+0.78%
2023	860	−1.56%
Source: INSEE

== Personalities ==
- Jean Todt, former co-pilot, director of Scuderia Ferrari.

== See also ==
- Communes of the Eure-et-Loir department
