= Blandainville =

- Commune
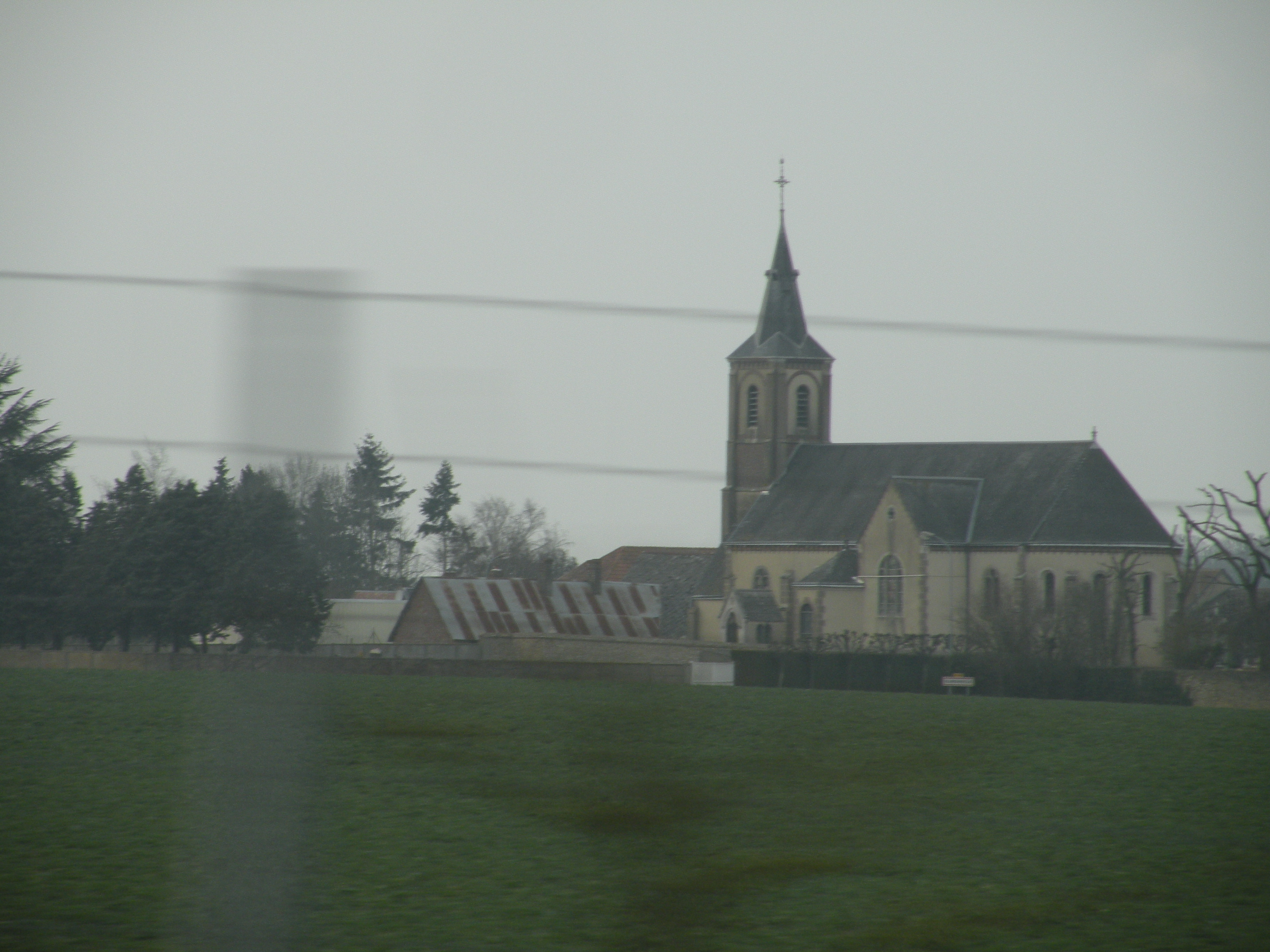
- The church and surroundings in Blandainville
- Location of Blandainville
- Location within France Location within Centre-Val de Loire
- Coordinates: 48°18′33″N 1°17′32″E
- Country: France
- Region: Centre-Val de Loire
- Department: Eure-et-Loir
- Arrondissement: Chartres
- Canton: Illiers-Combray
- Intercommunality: Entre Beauce et Perche

Government
  - Mayor (2020–2026): Philippe Forge
- Area^{1}: 13.68 km^{2} (5.28 sq mi)
- Elevation: 168 m (551 ft)
- Highest elevation: 173 m (568 ft)
- Lowest elevation: 152 m (499 ft)
- Population (2023): 283
  - Density: 20.7/km^{2} (53.6/sq mi)
- Time zone: UTC+01:00 (CET)
  - Summer (DST): UTC+02:00 (CEST)
- INSEE/Postal code: 28041 /28120
- ^{1} French Land Register data, which excludes lakes, ponds, glaciers > 1 km^{2} (0.386 sq mi or 247 acres) and river estuaries.

Blandainville (French pronunciation: [blɑ̃dɛ̃vil]) is a commune in the Eure-et-Loir department in northern France.

== Population ==
Historical population
Year	Pop.	±% p.a.
1968	323	—
1975	268	−2.63%
1982	308	+2.01%
1990	200	−5.25%
1999	197	−0.17%
2007	264	+3.73%
2012	215	−4.02%
2017	273	+4.89%
2023	283	+0.60%
Source: INSEE

== See also ==
- Communes of the Eure-et-Loir department
