= Maisons, Eure-et-Loir =

Maisons
- Commune
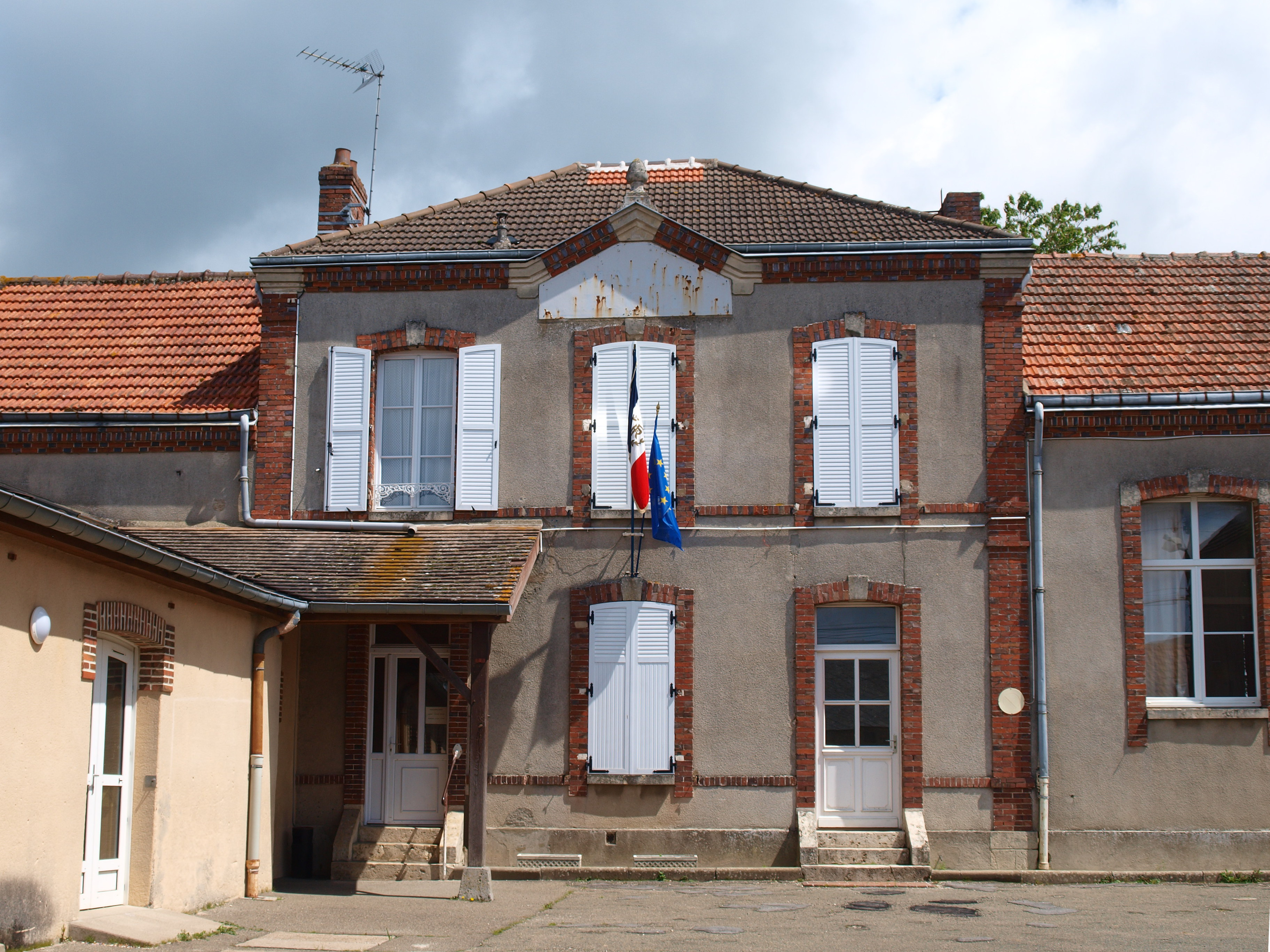
- The town hall in Maisons
- Location of Maisons
- Location within France Location within Centre-Val de Loire
- Coordinates: 48°24′32″N 1°50′46″E
- Country: France
- Region: Centre-Val de Loire
- Department: Eure-et-Loir
- Arrondissement: Chartres
- Canton: Auneau

Government
  - Mayor (2020–2026): Patricia Bernardon
- Area^{1}: 9.5 km^{2} (3.7 sq mi)
- Elevation: 161 m (528 ft)
- Highest elevation: 161 m (528 ft)
- Lowest elevation: 142 m (466 ft)
- Population (2023): 408
  - Density: 43/km^{2} (110/sq mi)
- Time zone: UTC+01:00 (CET)
  - Summer (DST): UTC+02:00 (CEST)
- INSEE/Postal code: 28230 /28700
- ^{1} French Land Register data, which excludes lakes, ponds, glaciers > 1 km^{2} (0.386 sq mi or 247 acres) and river estuaries.

Maisons (French pronunciation: [mɛzɔ̃]) is a commune in the Eure-et-Loir department in northern France.

== Population ==
Historical population
Year	Pop.	±% p.a.
1968	215	—
1975	176	−2.82%
1982	204	+2.13%
1990	227	+1.34%
1999	254	+1.26%
2007	317	+2.81%
2012	332	+0.93%
2017	374	+2.41%
2023	408	+1.46%
Source: INSEE

== See also ==
- Communes of the Eure-et-Loir department
