= Champseru =

- Commune
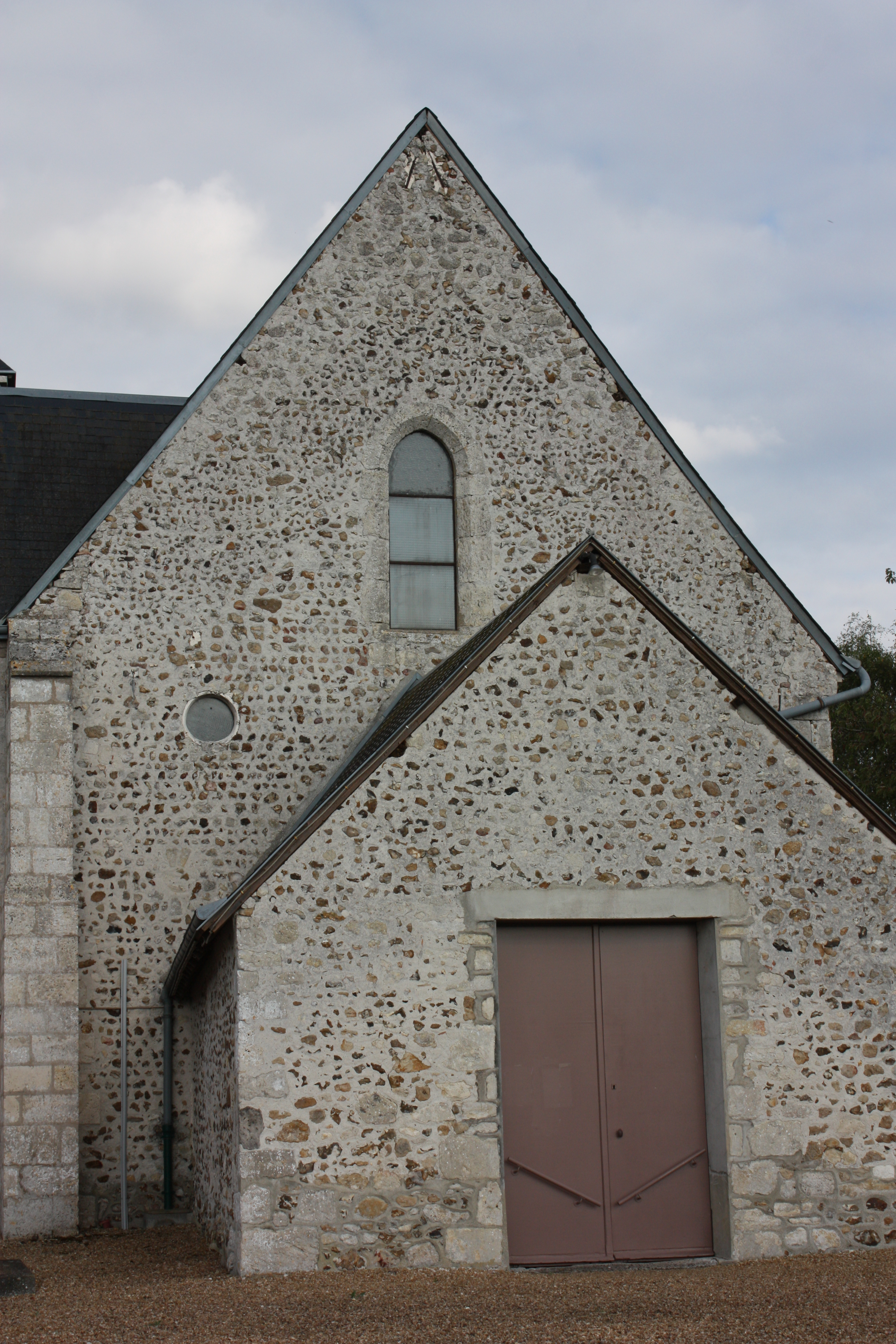
- The church in Champseru
- Location of Champseru
- Location within France Location within Centre-Val de Loire
- Coordinates: 48°29′35″N 1°39′27″E
- Country: France
- Region: Centre-Val de Loire
- Department: Eure-et-Loir
- Arrondissement: Chartres
- Canton: Auneau
- Intercommunality: CA Chartres Métropole

Government
  - Mayor (2020–2026): Corinne Brillot
- Area^{1}: 14.99 km^{2} (5.79 sq mi)
- Elevation: 150 m (490 ft)
- Highest elevation: 157 m (515 ft)
- Lowest elevation: 134 m (440 ft)
- Population (2023): 345
  - Density: 23.0/km^{2} (59.6/sq mi)
- Time zone: UTC+01:00 (CET)
  - Summer (DST): UTC+02:00 (CEST)
- INSEE/Postal code: 28073 /28700
- ^{1} French Land Register data, which excludes lakes, ponds, glaciers > 1 km^{2} (0.386 sq mi or 247 acres) and river estuaries.

Champseru (French pronunciation: [ʃɑ̃s(ə)ʁy]) is a commune in the Eure-et-Loir department in northern France. As of 2008, it has a population of 301.

== Population ==
Historical population
| Year | Pop. | ±% p.a. |
|---|---|---|
| 1968 | 162 | — |
| 1975 | 167 | +0.44% |
| 1982 | 241 | +5.38% |
| 1990 | 260 | +0.95% |
| 1999 | 302 | +1.68% |
| 2007 | 302 | +0.00% |
| 2012 | 283 | −1.29% |
| 2017 | 333 | +3.31% |
| 2023 | 345 | +0.59% |
Source: INSEE

== See also ==
- Communes of the Eure-et-Loir department
