= Umpeau =

- Commune
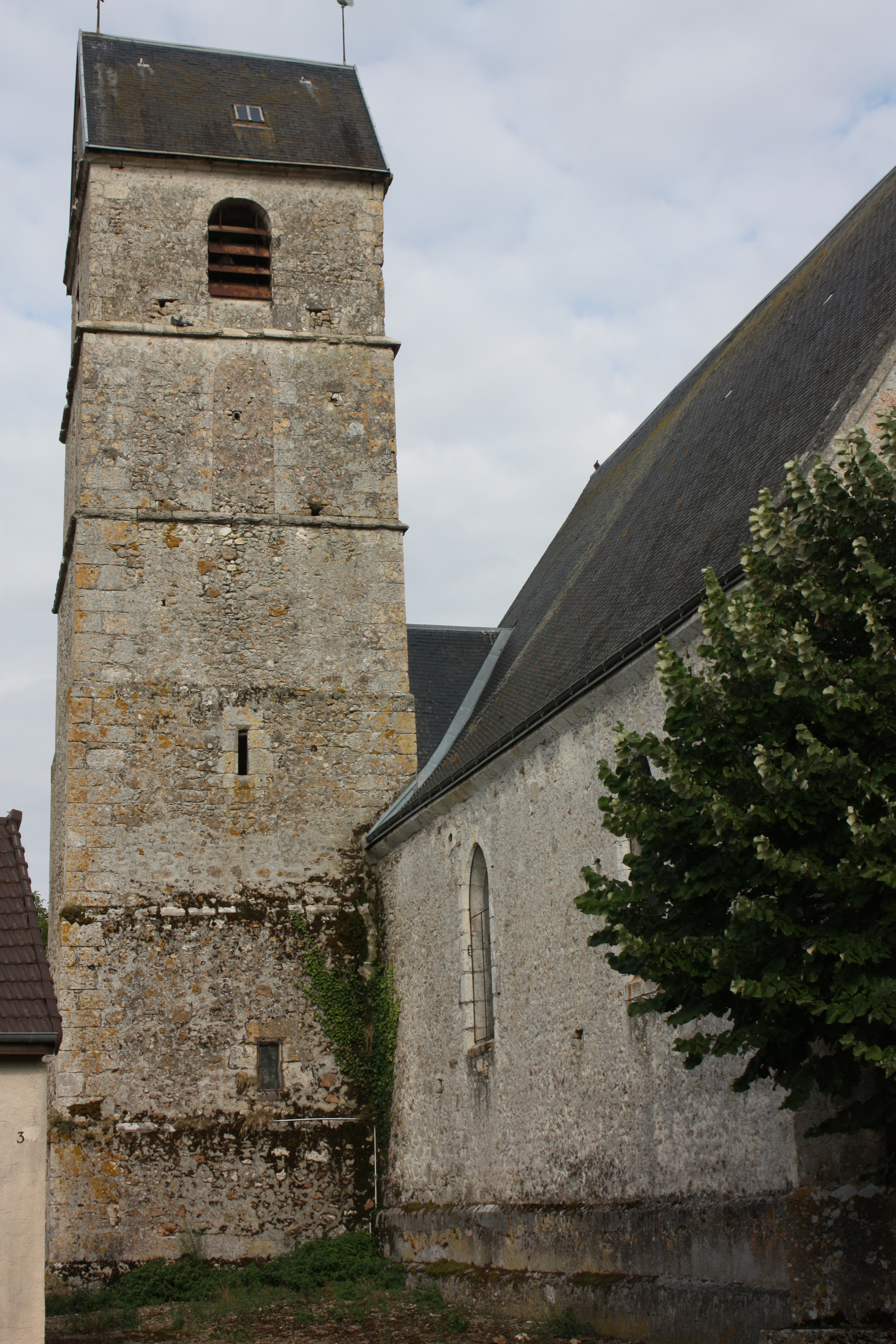
- The church in Umpeau
- Location of Umpeau
- Location within France Location within Centre-Val de Loire
- Coordinates: 48°28′41″N 1°40′20″E
- Country: France
- Region: Centre-Val de Loire
- Department: Eure-et-Loir
- Arrondissement: Chartres
- Canton: Auneau
- Intercommunality: CA Chartres Métropole

Government
  - Mayor (2022–2026): Eric Colas
- Area^{1}: 11.49 km^{2} (4.44 sq mi)
- Elevation: 160 m (520 ft)
- Highest elevation: 161 m (528 ft)
- Lowest elevation: 143 m (469 ft)
- Population (2023): 404
  - Density: 35.2/km^{2} (91.1/sq mi)
- Time zone: UTC+01:00 (CET)
  - Summer (DST): UTC+02:00 (CEST)
- INSEE/Postal code: 28397 /28700
- ^{1} French Land Register data, which excludes lakes, ponds, glaciers > 1 km^{2} (0.386 sq mi or 247 acres) and river estuaries.

Umpeau (French pronunciation: [œ̃po]) is a commune in the Eure-et-Loir department in northern France.

== Population ==
Historical population
Year	Pop.	±% p.a.
1968	175	—
1975	169	−0.50%
1982	203	+2.65%
1990	329	+6.22%
1999	381	+1.64%
2007	415	+1.07%
2012	425	+0.48%
2017	396	−1.40%
2023	404	+0.33%
Source: INSEE

== See also ==
- Communes of the Eure-et-Loir department
