= Saint-Léger-des-Aubées =

- Commune
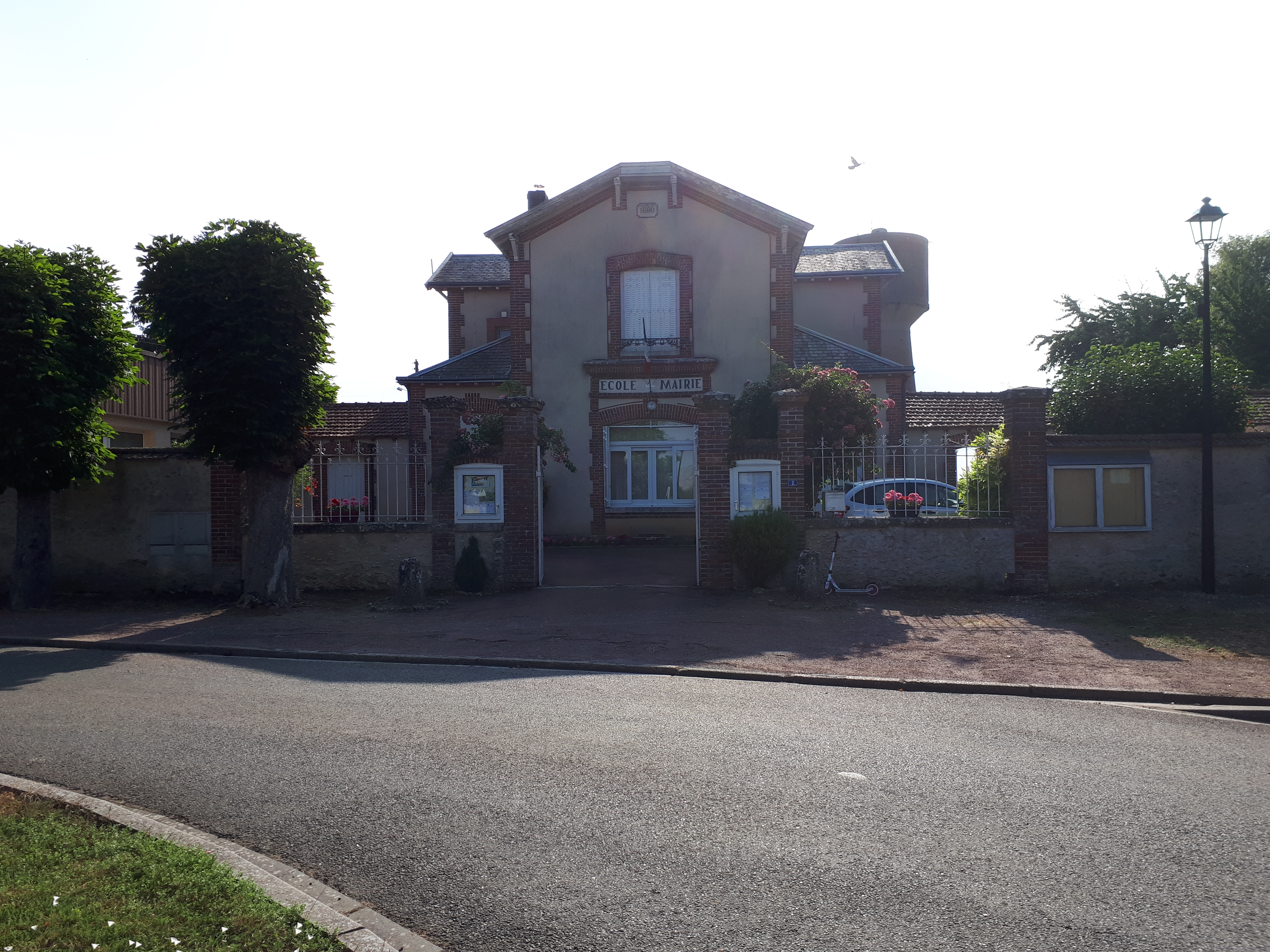
- The town hall in Saint-Léger-des-Aubées
- Location of Saint-Léger-des-Aubées
- Location within France Location within Centre-Val de Loire
- Coordinates: 48°24′46″N 1°44′24″E
- Country: France
- Region: Centre-Val de Loire
- Department: Eure-et-Loir
- Arrondissement: Chartres
- Canton: Auneau
- Intercommunality: CA Chartres Métropole

Government
  - Mayor (2020–2026): Maurice Cintrat
- Area^{1}: 13.18 km^{2} (5.09 sq mi)
- Elevation: 153 m (502 ft)
- Highest elevation: 154 m (505 ft)
- Lowest elevation: 127 m (417 ft)
- Population (2023): 254
  - Density: 19.3/km^{2} (49.9/sq mi)
- Time zone: UTC+01:00 (CET)
  - Summer (DST): UTC+02:00 (CEST)
- INSEE/Postal code: 28344 /28700
- ^{1} French Land Register data, which excludes lakes, ponds, glaciers > 1 km^{2} (0.386 sq mi or 247 acres) and river estuaries.

Saint-Léger-des-Aubées (French pronunciation: [sɛ̃ leʒe de.z‿obe]) is a commune in the Eure-et-Loir department in northern France.

== Population ==
Historical population
Year	Pop.	±% p.a.
1968	205	—
1975	192	−0.93%
1982	232	+2.74%
1990	242	+0.53%
1999	237	−0.23%
2007	246	+0.47%
2012	260	+1.11%
2017	266	+0.46%
2023	254	−0.77%
Source: INSEE

== See also ==
- Communes of the Eure-et-Loir department
