= Poinville =

- Commune
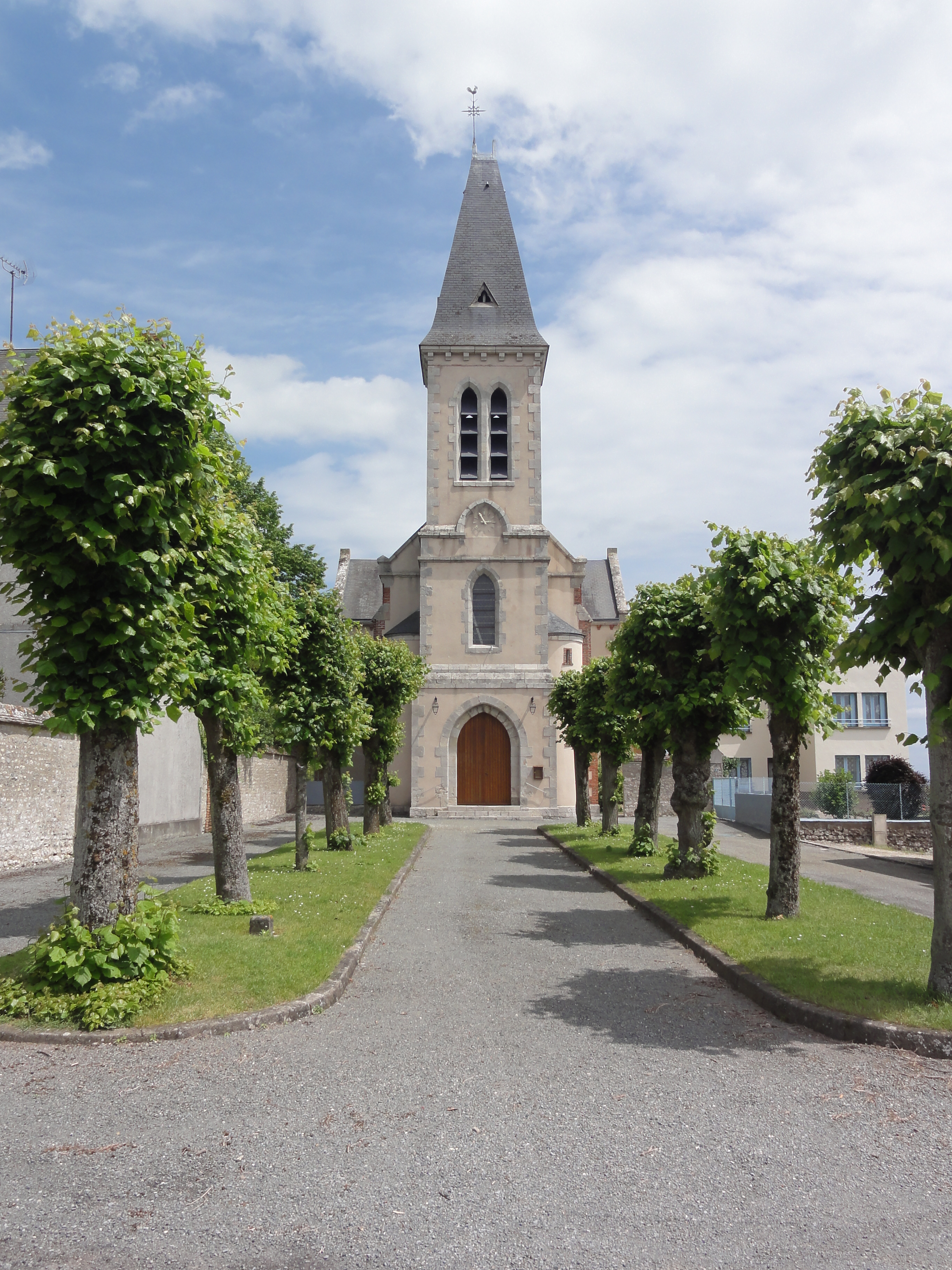
- The church in Poinville
- Location of Poinville
- Location within France Location within Centre-Val de Loire
- Coordinates: 48°10′45″N 1°54′11″E
- Country: France
- Region: Centre-Val de Loire
- Department: Eure-et-Loir
- Arrondissement: Chartres
- Canton: Les Villages Vovéens

Government
  - Mayor (2020–2026): Daniel Lehérissé
- Area^{1}: 8.08 km^{2} (3.12 sq mi)
- Elevation: 137 m (449 ft)
- Highest elevation: 137 m (449 ft)
- Lowest elevation: 124 m (407 ft)
- Population (2023): 176
  - Density: 21.8/km^{2} (56.4/sq mi)
- Time zone: UTC+01:00 (CET)
  - Summer (DST): UTC+02:00 (CEST)
- INSEE/Postal code: 28300 /28310
- ^{1} French Land Register data, which excludes lakes, ponds, glaciers > 1 km^{2} (0.386 sq mi or 247 acres) and river estuaries.

Poinville (French pronunciation: [pwɛ̃vil]) is a commune in the Eure-et-Loir department in northern France.

== Population ==
Historical population
Year	Pop.	±% p.a.
1968	175	—
1975	136	−3.54%
1982	107	−3.37%
1990	100	−0.84%
1999	110	+1.06%
2007	116	+0.67%
2012	141	+3.98%
2017	142	+0.14%
2023	176	+3.64%
Source: INSEE

== See also ==
- Communes of the Eure-et-Loir department
