= Châtenay, Eure-et-Loir =

Châtenay
- Commune
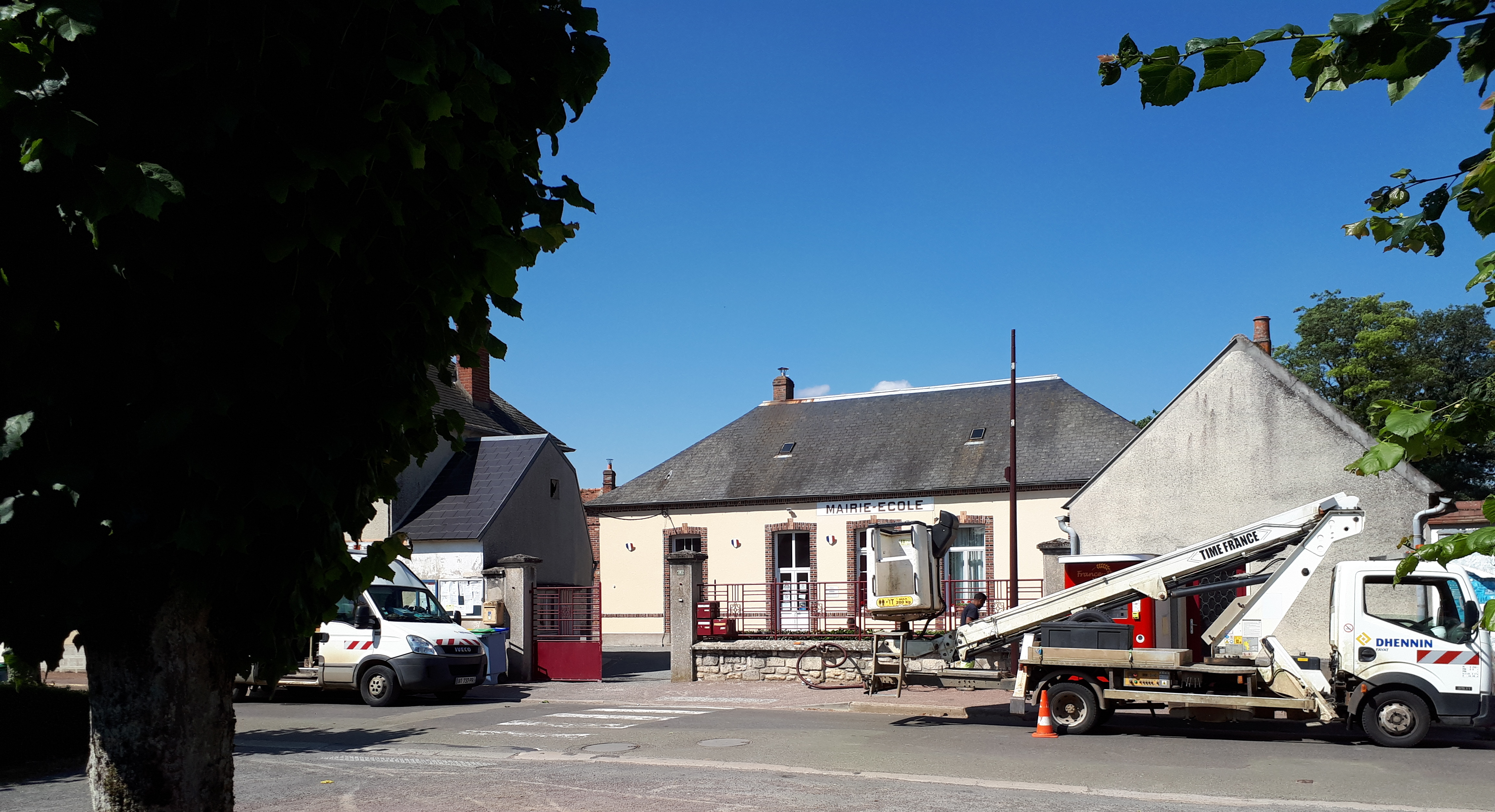
- The town hall in Châtenay
- Location of Châtenay
- Location within France Location within Centre-Val de Loire
- Coordinates: 48°21′32″N 1°53′03″E
- Country: France
- Region: Centre-Val de Loire
- Department: Eure-et-Loir
- Arrondissement: Chartres
- Canton: Auneau

Government
  - Mayor (2020–2026): Laurent Daguet
- Area^{1}: 10.27 km^{2} (3.97 sq mi)
- Elevation: 150 m (490 ft)
- Highest elevation: 154 m (505 ft)
- Lowest elevation: 140 m (460 ft)
- Population (2023): 241
  - Density: 23.5/km^{2} (60.8/sq mi)
- Time zone: UTC+01:00 (CET)
  - Summer (DST): UTC+02:00 (CEST)
- INSEE/Postal code: 28092 /28700
- ^{1} French Land Register data, which excludes lakes, ponds, glaciers > 1 km^{2} (0.386 sq mi or 247 acres) and river estuaries.

Châtenay (French pronunciation: [ʃatnɛ]) is a commune in the Eure-et-Loir department in northern France.

== Population ==
Historical population
Year	Pop.	±% p.a.
1968	169	—
1975	142	−2.46%
1982	148	+0.59%
1990	150	+0.17%
1999	171	+1.47%
2007	223	+3.37%
2012	240	+1.48%
2017	238	−0.17%
2023	241	+0.21%
Source: INSEE

== See also ==
- Communes of the Eure-et-Loir department
