= Léthuin =

- Commune
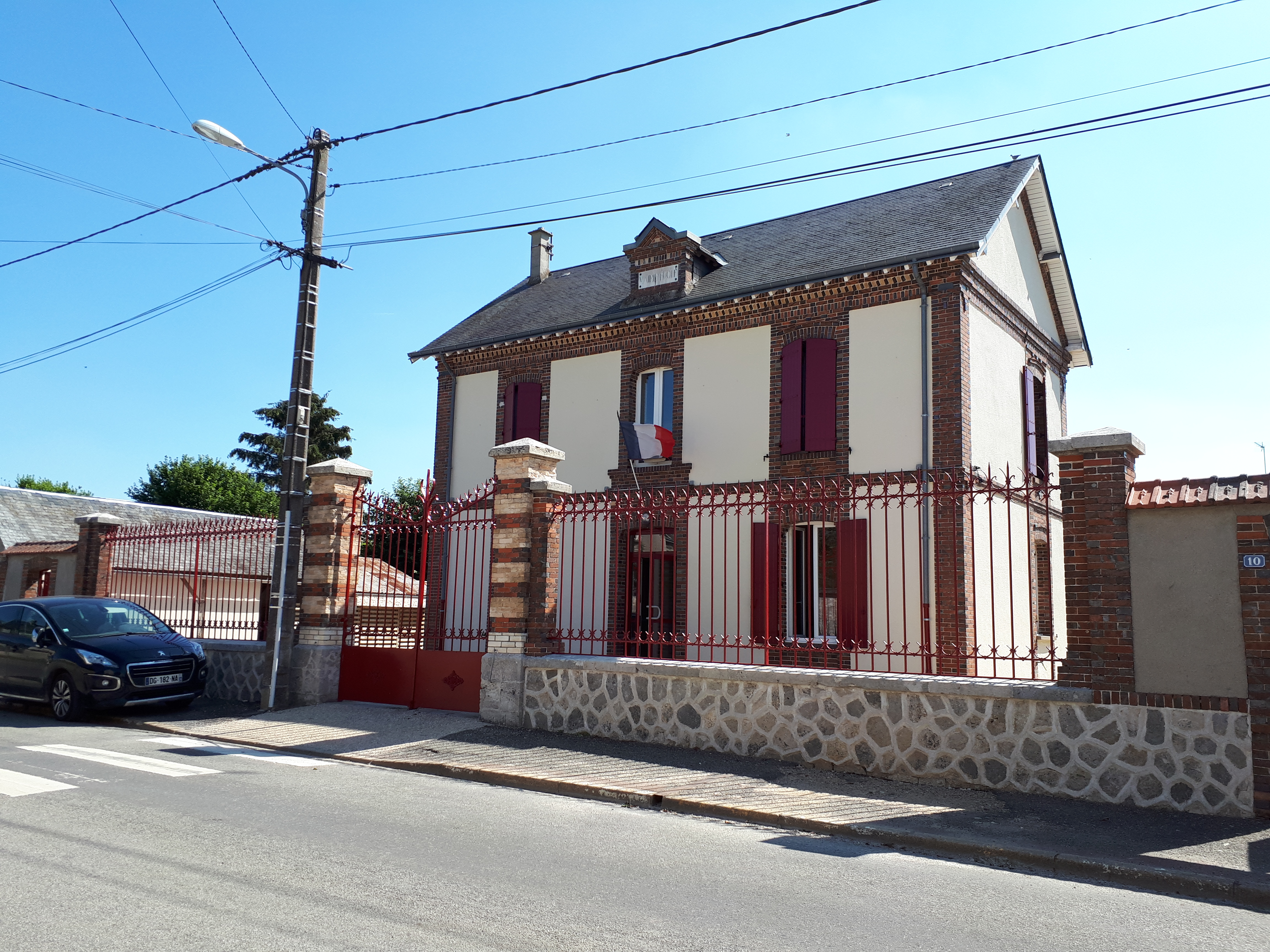
- The town hall in Léthuin
- Location of Léthuin
- Location within France Location within Centre-Val de Loire
- Coordinates: 48°22′07″N 1°52′09″E
- Country: France
- Region: Centre-Val de Loire
- Department: Eure-et-Loir
- Arrondissement: Chartres
- Canton: Auneau

Government
  - Mayor (2020–2026): Francisco Teixeira
- Area^{1}: 7.18 km^{2} (2.77 sq mi)
- Elevation: 151 m (495 ft)
- Highest elevation: 156 m (512 ft)
- Lowest elevation: 146 m (479 ft)
- Population (2023): 240
  - Density: 33/km^{2} (87/sq mi)
- Time zone: UTC+01:00 (CET)
  - Summer (DST): UTC+02:00 (CEST)
- INSEE/Postal code: 28207 /28700
- ^{1} French Land Register data, which excludes lakes, ponds, glaciers > 1 km^{2} (0.386 sq mi or 247 acres) and river estuaries.

Léthuin (French pronunciation: [letɥɛ̃]) is a commune in the Eure-et-Loir department in northern France.

== Population ==
Historical population
Year	Pop.	±% p.a.
1968	118	—
1975	115	−0.37%
1982	97	−2.40%
1990	146	+5.24%
1999	159	+0.95%
2007	205	+3.23%
2012	217	+1.14%
2017	229	+1.08%
2023	240	+0.79%
Source: INSEE

== See also ==
- Communes of the Eure-et-Loir department
