= Francourville =

- Commune
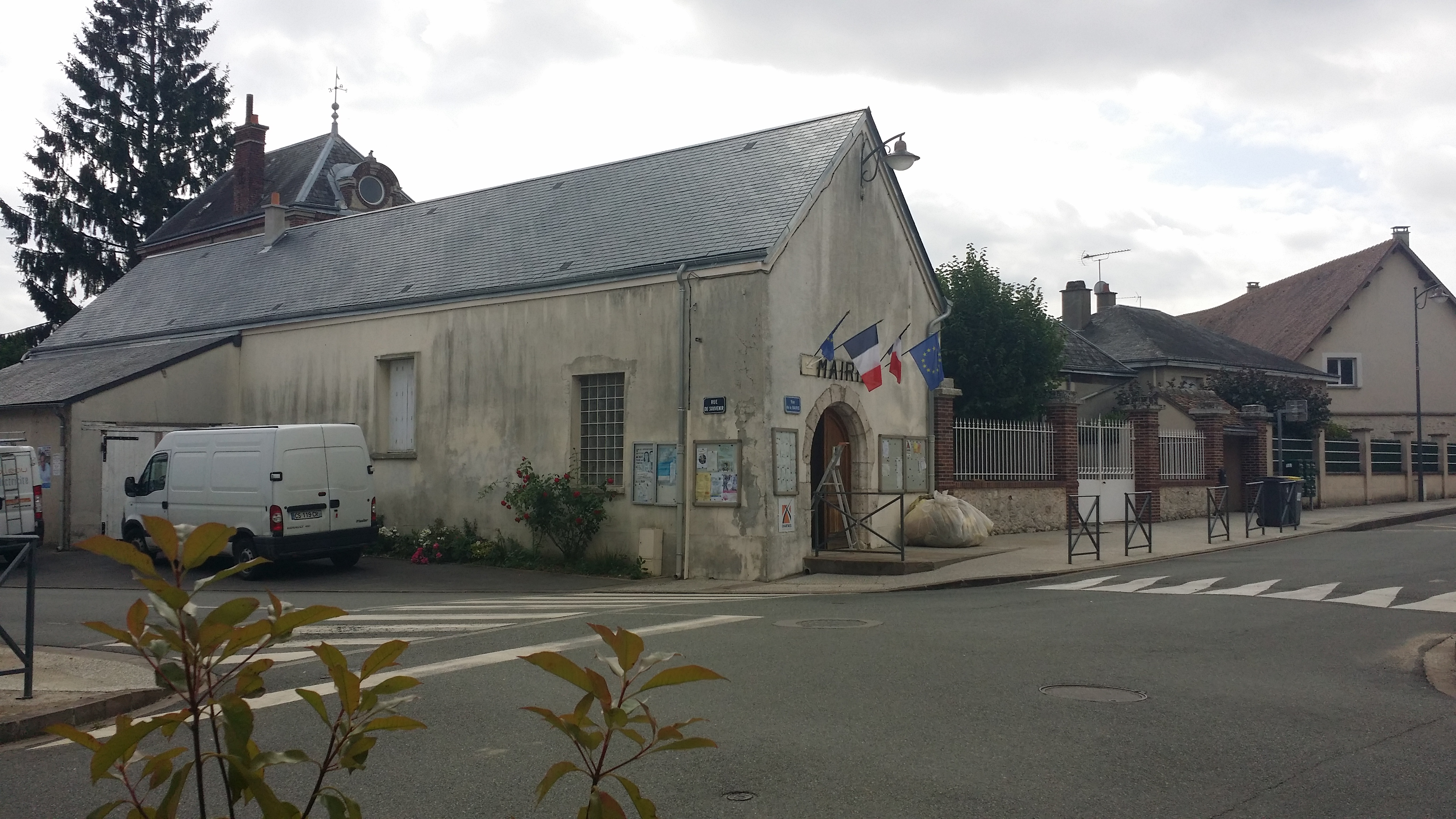
- The town hall in Francourville
- Location of Francourville
- Location within France Location within Centre-Val de Loire
- Coordinates: 48°24′19″N 1°39′43″E
- Country: France
- Region: Centre-Val de Loire
- Department: Eure-et-Loir
- Arrondissement: Chartres
- Canton: Auneau
- Intercommunality: CA Chartres Métropole

Government
  - Mayor (2020–2026): Éric Moulin
- Area^{1}: 18.46 km^{2} (7.13 sq mi)
- Elevation: 157 m (515 ft)
- Highest elevation: 157 m (515 ft)
- Lowest elevation: 137 m (449 ft)
- Population (2023): 941
  - Density: 51.0/km^{2} (132/sq mi)
- Time zone: UTC+01:00 (CET)
  - Summer (DST): UTC+02:00 (CEST)
- INSEE/Postal code: 28160 /28700
- ^{1} French Land Register data, which excludes lakes, ponds, glaciers > 1 km^{2} (0.386 sq mi or 247 acres) and river estuaries.

Francourville (French pronunciation: [fʁɑ̃kuʁvil]) is a commune in the Eure-et-Loir department in northern France.

== Population ==
Historical population
Year	Pop.	±% p.a.
1968	508	—
1975	475	−0.95%
1982	550	+2.12%
1990	805	+4.88%
1999	797	−0.11%
2007	796	−0.02%
2012	772	−0.61%
2017	833	+1.53%
2023	941	+2.05%
Source: INSEE

== See also ==
- Communes of the Eure-et-Loir department
