= Trancrainville =

- Commune
- Location of Trancrainville
- Location within France Location within Centre-Val de Loire
- Coordinates: 48°14′23″N 1°51′39″E
- Country: France
- Region: Centre-Val de Loire
- Department: Eure-et-Loir
- Arrondissement: Chartres
- Canton: Les Villages Vovéens
- Intercommunality: Cœur de Beauce

Government
  - Mayor (2022–2026): Roger Mineau
- Area^{1}: 11.61 km^{2} (4.48 sq mi)
- Elevation: 138 m (453 ft)
- Highest elevation: 142 m (466 ft)
- Lowest elevation: 124 m (407 ft)
- Population (2023): 169
  - Density: 14.6/km^{2} (37.7/sq mi)
- Time zone: UTC+01:00 (CET)
  - Summer (DST): UTC+02:00 (CEST)
- INSEE/Postal code: 28392 /28310
- ^{1} French Land Register data, which excludes lakes, ponds, glaciers > 1 km^{2} (0.386 sq mi or 247 acres) and river estuaries.

Trancrainville (French pronunciation: [tʁɑ̃kʁɛ̃vil]) is a commune in the Eure-et-Loir department in northern France.

== Population ==
Historical population
Year	Pop.	±% p.a.
1968	268	—
1975	224	−2.53%
1982	182	−2.92%
1990	159	−1.67%
1999	170	+0.75%
2007	153	−1.31%
2012	179	+3.19%
2017	161	−2.10%
2023	169	+0.81%
Source: INSEE

== See also ==
- Communes of the Eure-et-Loir department
