= Mondonville-Saint-Jean =

- Commune
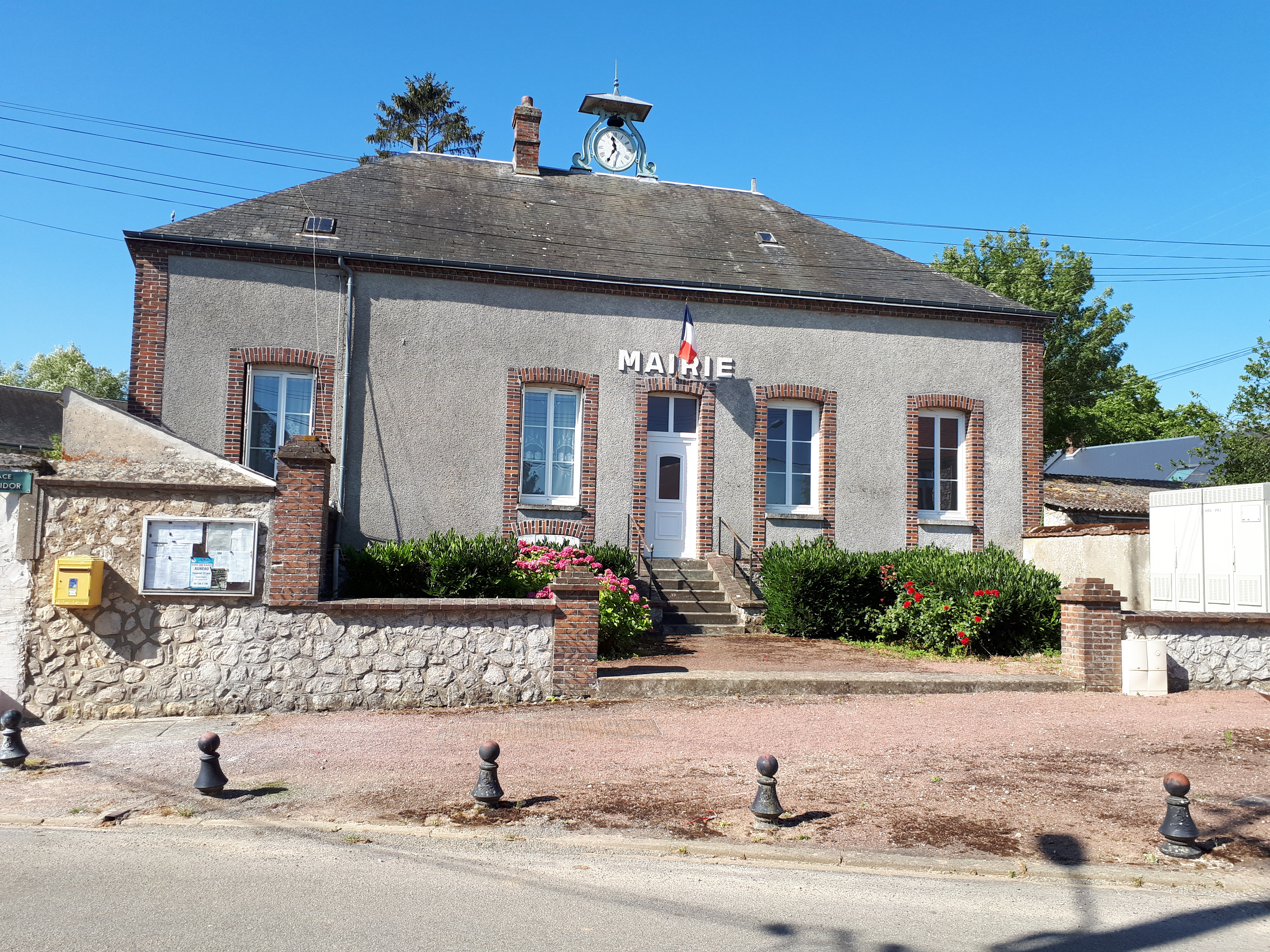
- The town hall in Mondonville-Saint-Jean
- Location of Mondonville-Saint-Jean
- Location within France Location within Centre-Val de Loire
- Coordinates: 48°21′52″N 1°49′34″E
- Country: France
- Region: Centre-Val de Loire
- Department: Eure-et-Loir
- Arrondissement: Chartres
- Canton: Auneau
- Intercommunality: Portes Euréliennes d'Île-de-France

Government
  - Mayor (2020–2026): Emmanuel Morizet
- Area^{1}: 5.44 km^{2} (2.10 sq mi)
- Elevation: 150 m (490 ft)
- Highest elevation: 154 m (505 ft)
- Lowest elevation: 147 m (482 ft)
- Population (2023): 96
  - Density: 18/km^{2} (46/sq mi)
- Time zone: UTC+01:00 (CET)
  - Summer (DST): UTC+02:00 (CEST)
- INSEE/Postal code: 28257 /28700
- ^{1} French Land Register data, which excludes lakes, ponds, glaciers > 1 km^{2} (0.386 sq mi or 247 acres) and river estuaries.

Mondonville-Saint-Jean (French pronunciation: [mɔ̃dɔ̃vil sɛ̃ ʒɑ̃]), commonly known as Mondonville, is a commune in the French department of Eure-et-Loir, Centre-Val de Loire, France.

== Population ==
Historical population
Year	Pop.	±% p.a.
1968	57	—
1975	62	+1.21%
1982	51	−2.75%
1990	56	+1.18%
1999	58	+0.39%
2007	89	+5.50%
2012	87	−0.45%
2017	87	+0.00%
2023	96	+1.65%
Source: INSEE

== See also ==
- Communes of the Eure-et-Loir department
