= Santeuil, Eure-et-Loir =

Santeuil
- Commune
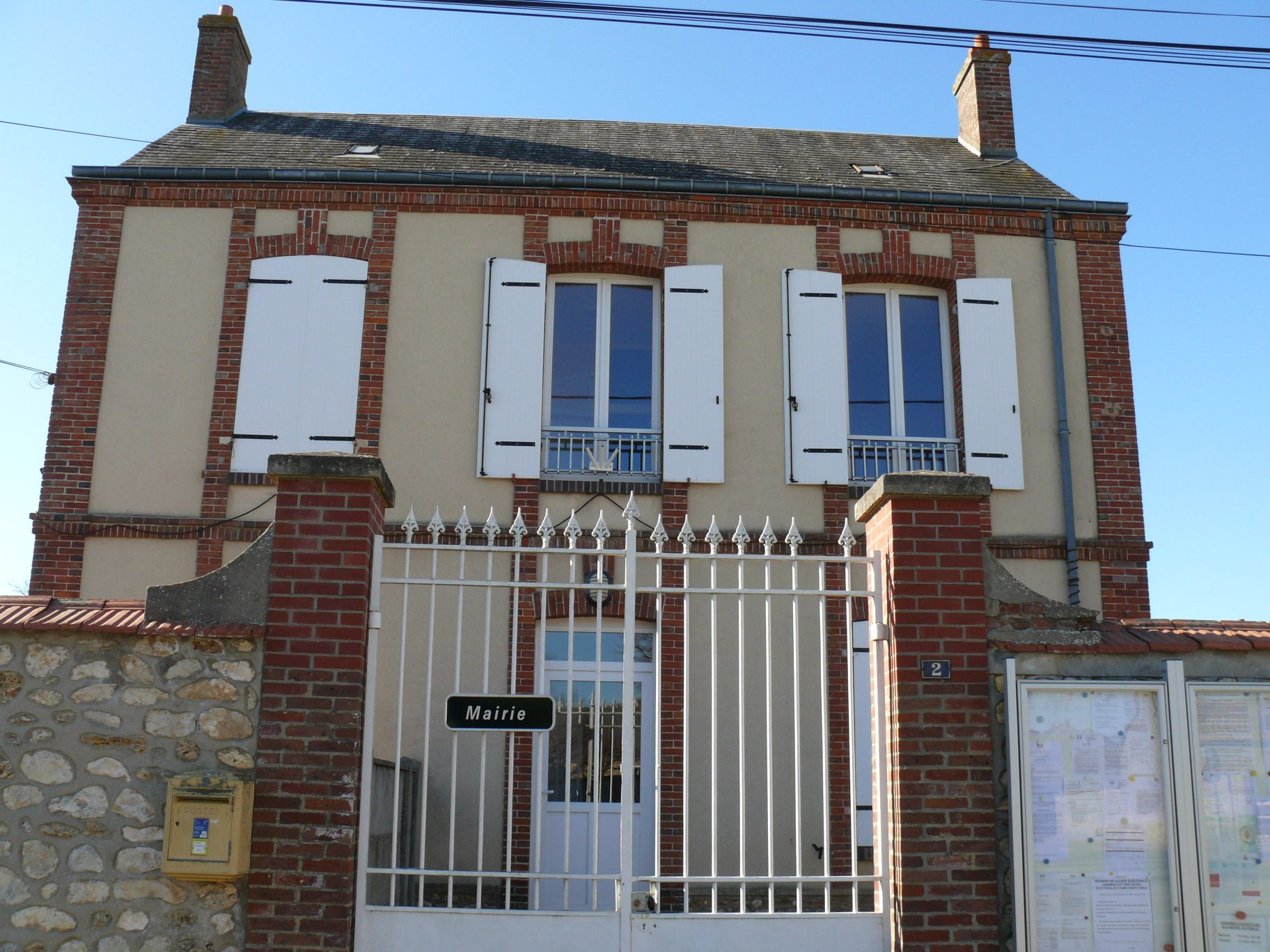
- The town hall in Santeuil
- Location of Santeuil
- Location within France Location within Centre-Val de Loire
- Coordinates: 48°23′18″N 1°44′03″E
- Country: France
- Region: Centre-Val de Loire
- Department: Eure-et-Loir
- Arrondissement: Chartres
- Canton: Auneau
- Intercommunality: CA Chartres Métropole

Government
  - Mayor (2021–2026): Armindo Gomes
- Area^{1}: 9.24 km^{2} (3.57 sq mi)
- Elevation: 152 m (499 ft)
- Highest elevation: 152 m (499 ft)
- Lowest elevation: 139 m (456 ft)
- Population (2023): 324
  - Density: 35.1/km^{2} (90.8/sq mi)
- Time zone: UTC+01:00 (CET)
  - Summer (DST): UTC+02:00 (CEST)
- INSEE/Postal code: 28366 /28700
- ^{1} French Land Register data, which excludes lakes, ponds, glaciers > 1 km^{2} (0.386 sq mi or 247 acres) and river estuaries.

Santeuil (French pronunciation: [sɑ̃tœj]) is a commune in the Eure-et-Loir department in northern France.

== Population ==
Historical population

Year	Pop.	±% p.a.
1793	309	—
1821	302	−0.08%
1846	300	−0.03%
1872	289	−0.14%
1901	292	+0.04%
1926	279	−0.18%
1946	255	−0.45%
1962	219	−0.95%
1968	204	−1.18%

Year	Pop.	±% p.a.
1975	176	−2.09%
1982	205	+2.20%
1990	244	+2.20%
1999	242	−0.09%
2007	269	+1.33%
2012	293	+1.72%
2017	320	+1.78%
2023	324	+0.21%

Source: EHESS and INSEE (1968-2023)

== See also ==
- Communes of the Eure-et-Loir department
