= Canton of Auneau =

Coordinates: 48.46°N 1.77°E

The canton of Auneau is an administrative division of the Eure-et-Loir department, northern France. Its borders were modified at the French canton reorganisation which came into effect in March 2015. Its seat is in Auneau-Bleury-Saint-Symphorien.

It consists of the following communes:

1. Ardelu
2. Aunay-sous-Auneau
3. Auneau-Bleury-Saint-Symphorien
4. Bailleau-Armenonville
5. Béville-le-Comte
6. Champseru
7. La Chapelle-d'Aunainville
8. Châtenay
9. Denonville
10. Écrosnes
11. Francourville
12. Gallardon
13. Garancières-en-Beauce
14. Le Gué-de-Longroi
15. Houville-la-Branche
16. Léthuin
17. Levainville
18. Maisons
19. Moinville-la-Jeulin
20. Mondonville-Saint-Jean
21. Morainville
22. Oinville-sous-Auneau
23. Oysonville
24. Roinville
25. Saint-Léger-des-Aubées
26. Sainville
27. Santeuil
28. Umpeau
29. Vierville
30. Voise
31. Yermenonville
32. Ymeray
