= Canton of Chartres-Sud-Est =

Chartres-Sud-Est
- Former canton
- Position of the former Canton of Chartres-Sud-Est in the arrondissement of Chartres.
- Coordinates: 48.4084°N 1.5823°E
- Country: France
- Region: Centre-Val de Loire
- Department: Eure-et-Loir
- No. of communes: {{{nbcomm}}}
- Disbanded: 2015
- Population (2012): 23,692

The canton of Chartres-Sud-Est is a former French administrative division located in the département of Eure-et-Loir in the région of Centre-Val de Loire. It had 23,692 inhabitants (2012).

== History ==
The canton was created in 1973, at the same time as the cantons of Chartres-Sud-Ouest, Chartres-Nord-Est and Chartres-Nord-Ouest. It was abolished by the decree of 24 February 2014 (effective from 29 March 2015) which incorporated its constituent parts into the newly created Canton of Chartres-2.

== Composition ==
The canton comprised the following communes:

- Berchères-les-Pierres
- Chartres (partly)
- Le Coudray
- Gellainville
- Nogent-le-Phaye
- Prunay-le-Gillon
- Sours

== See also ==
- Cantons of the Eure-et-Loir department
