= Georges Lemoine (politician) =

French politician (1934–2025)

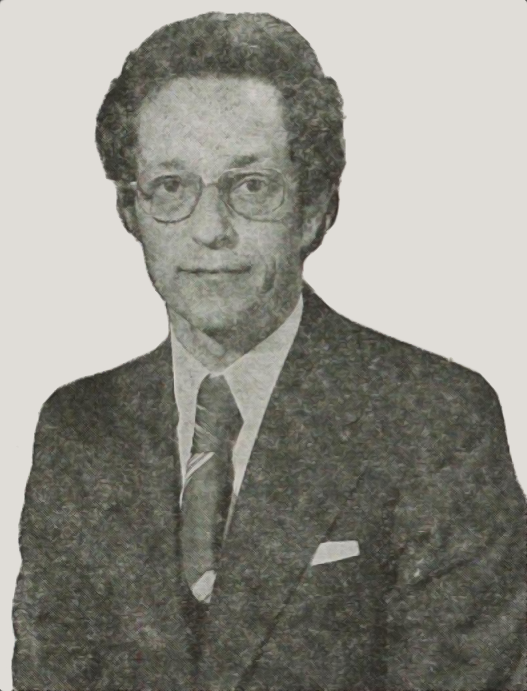
- Lemoine in 1981

Deputy of the French National Assembly
- In office 12 June 1997 – 18 June 2002
- Preceded by: Gérard Cornu
- Succeeded by: Jean-Pierre Gorges
- Constituency: Eure-et-Loir's 1st constituency
- In office 2 April 1986 – 1 April 1993
- Succeeded by: Gérard Cornu
- Constituency: Proportional representation (1986–1988); Eure-et-Loir's 1st constituency (1988–1993)
- In office 3 April 1978 – 24 July 1981
- Preceded by: Claude Gerbet
- Succeeded by: Jean Gallet
- Constituency: Eure-et-Loir's 1st constituency

Mayor of Chartres
- In office 25 March 1977 – 27 January 1998
- Preceded by: Jean Laillet
- Succeeded by: Jean-Louis Guillain

Member of the General Council of Eure-et-Loir for the Canton of Chartres-Sud-Est
- In office 1 April 1994 – 21 March 2008
- In office 5 October 1973 – 7 October 1988

Personal details
- Born: 20 June 1934 Rouen, France
- Died: 25 July 2025 (aged 91) Caen, France
- Party: PS (1971–2008); POI (2008–2025)
- Education: École normale supérieure de Saint-Cloud
- Occupation: Docent

Georges Lemoine (French: [ʒɔʁʒ ləmwan]; 20 June 1934 – 25 July 2025) was a French politician of the Socialist Party (PS) and the Independent Workers' Party (POI).

== Life and career ==
=== Early life and early political career ===
Born in Rouen on 20 June 1934, Lemoine attended the École normale supérieure de Saint-Cloud. He became a docent and joined the Convention of Republican Institutions, led by François Mitterrand, in 1965. He had his first experience in politics when he stood on the centre-left list in Dreux in the 1971 municipal elections. However, he was not elected and thereafter joined the PS. In 1973, he unsuccessfully stood in Eure-et-Loir's 1st constituency. He was finally successful in the 1973 cantonal elections, representing the Canton of Chartres-Sud-Est. In 1977, he was elected mayor of Chartres and won a seat in the National Assembly in 1978.

=== First term as mayor of Chartres ===
During his first term as mayor of Chartres, Lemoine created a plan to expand the city's hotel capacity despite opposition from the Confédération nationale des hôteliers. In 1980, he inaugurated the Centre international du vitrail in the presence of President Valéry Giscard d'Estaing. He entered into a dispute with deputy mayor André Heitz and resigned to separate himself from the deputy, but was re-elected by the municipal council on 12 October 1981, which allowed him to pick a new deputy mayor.

=== State Secretary ===
After the 1981 presidential election, which saw a victory by socialist François Mitterrand, Lemoine was appointed State Secretary of Industry, a position he held for only one month. He was re-elected in that year's legislative election, but resigned his seat to participate in other executive roles.

=== Re-election as mayor of Chartres ===
In 1988, Lemoine launched the "Centre international médiéval" to highlight the city's heritage. The project envisaged the development of a 15,000 m^{2} museum of religious art underneath the Chartres Cathedral. An archeological excavation site was launched in 1990, followed by architectural completion in 1993, but the project was never completed. During the 1989 elections, he was re-elected as mayor in the first round. In 1991, he created a 200-hectare business park near the A11 autoroute to attract business to the city.

=== Disagreements with the PS ===
Lemoine founded his own political club, the Union républicaine pour l'Eure-et-Loir (UREL) in 1992. That year, he refused to lead the PS in the cantonal elections. During the 1993 legislative election, he was beaten by Rally for the Republic candidate Georges Cornu. In the 1994 cantonal elections, he refused to run as a PS candidate, but still won a mandate under the UREL label.

After temporarily resolving his disputes with the PS, he was re-elected as mayor of Chartres in 1995. However, the town had begun to experience financial difficulties, made public by a Chambre régionale des comptes report in 1996. He then took drastic measures, raising taxes and strictly controlling expenditures, to avoid supervision of the city's finances by the Prefect. In 1997, he narrowly won back his seat in the National Assembly. To avoid holding multiple mandates, he resigned as mayor of Chartres the following year, though he remained president of the District de Chartres, which became the Communauté d'agglomération Chartres Métropole in 2000.

=== Loss of municipal and national mandates ===
Lemoine suffered defeats in the 2001 municipal elections and the 2002 legislative elections. He did not advance to the second round in the Chartres mayoral race, which was eventually won by Jean-Pierre Gorges. Gorges also defeated him in the second round in the following year's legislative election.

=== Political decline ===
After his election defeats, Lemoine was removed as PS leader in Eure-et-Loir in favor of deputy Jacky Jaulneau. He maintained his general council seat in the 2004 cantonal elections, but lost it in 2008. He also unsuccessfully ran for the National Assembly in 2007. However, that election was invalidated following fraud discovered by Jean-Pierre Gorges and Lemoine contested the seat again. He withdrew from the PS and gained the support of the Independent Workers' Party. However, he did not advance to the second round. In 2011, he attempted to gain a spot back in the General Council of Eure-et-Loir, but only received 5.74% of the votes.

=== After politics ===
After his retirement from politics, he faced difficult times, and was arrested for public intoxication on a train in 2013. He was interviewed during the 2014 municipal elections and expressed regret that his plan for a historical research centre on the Chartres Cathedral square had never come to fruition.

=== Death ===
Lemoine died in Caen on 25 July 2025, at the age of 91.

== Distinctions ==
- Knight of the Legion of Honour (1994)
- Médaille d'honneur de l'engagement ultramarin (Medal of Honor for Overseas Commitment) (2022)
