= Philarète Chasles =

French critic and man of letters (1798–1873)

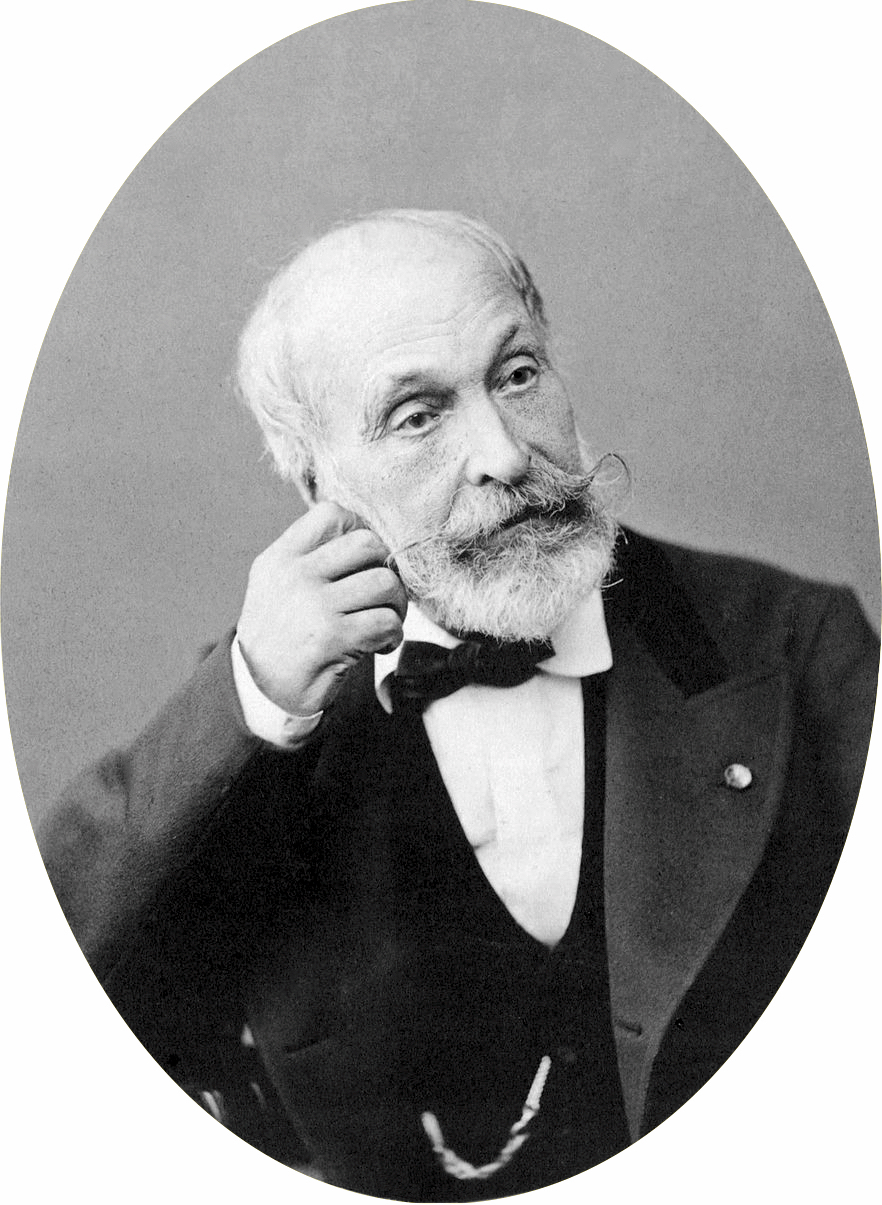
- Photograph of Philarète Chasles, hold in the Bibliothèque Mazarine
- Born: Philarète Euphémon Chasles; 6 October 1798; Mainvilliers
- Died: 18 July 1873; Venice
- Resting place: Saint Chéron Cemetery
- Occupations: Translator, journalist, professor, librarian (1837–1873), writer, conservator-restorer, critic
- Children: Émile Chasles
- Father: Pierre-Jacques-Michel Chasles
- Awards: Chevalier of the Legion of Honour

Signature
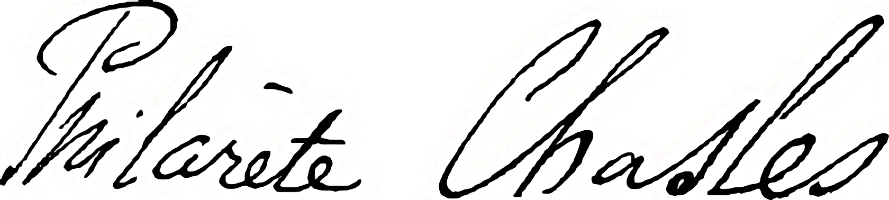

Philarète Euphemon Chasles (6 October 1798 – 18 July 1873) was a widely-known French critic and man of letters.

== Life and work ==
He was born at Mainvilliers, Eure-et-Loir. His father, Pierre Jacques Michel Chasles (1754–1826), was a member of the Convention, and was one of those who voted the death of Louis XVI. He brought up his son according to the principles of Rousseau's Emile, and the boy, after a regime of outdoor life, followed by some years classical study, was apprenticed to a printer, so that he might make acquaintance with manual labor. His master was involved in one of the plots of 1815, and Philarète suffered two months imprisonment.

On his release he was sent to London, where he worked for the printer Abraham John Valpy on editions of classical authors. He wrote articles for the English reviews, and on his return to France did much to popularize the study of English authors. He introduced a number of foreign writers to France including Gozzi, Richter, and Melville.

He was one of the true origins of the discipline of comparative literature. He was also one of the earliest to draw attention in France to Scandinavian and Russian literature. He contributed to the Revue des deux mondes, until he had a violent quarrel, terminating in a lawsuit, with François Buloz, who won his case.

He was especially interested in national literatures and their influence on other nations. He became librarian of the Bibliothèque Mazarine, and from 1841 was professor of comparative literature at the Collège de France. During his active life he produced some fifty volumes of literary history and criticism, and of social history, much of which is extremely valuable. He died at Venice in 1873.

His son, Émile Chasles (1827–1908), was a philologist of some reputation.

Among his best critical works is Dix-huitime siècle en Angleterre (1846), one of a series of 20 vols. of Etudes de littérature comparée (1846–1875), which he called later Trente ans de critique. An account of his strenuous boyhood is given in his Maison de mon pré. His Memoires (1876–1877) did not fulfil the expectations based on his brilliant talk.

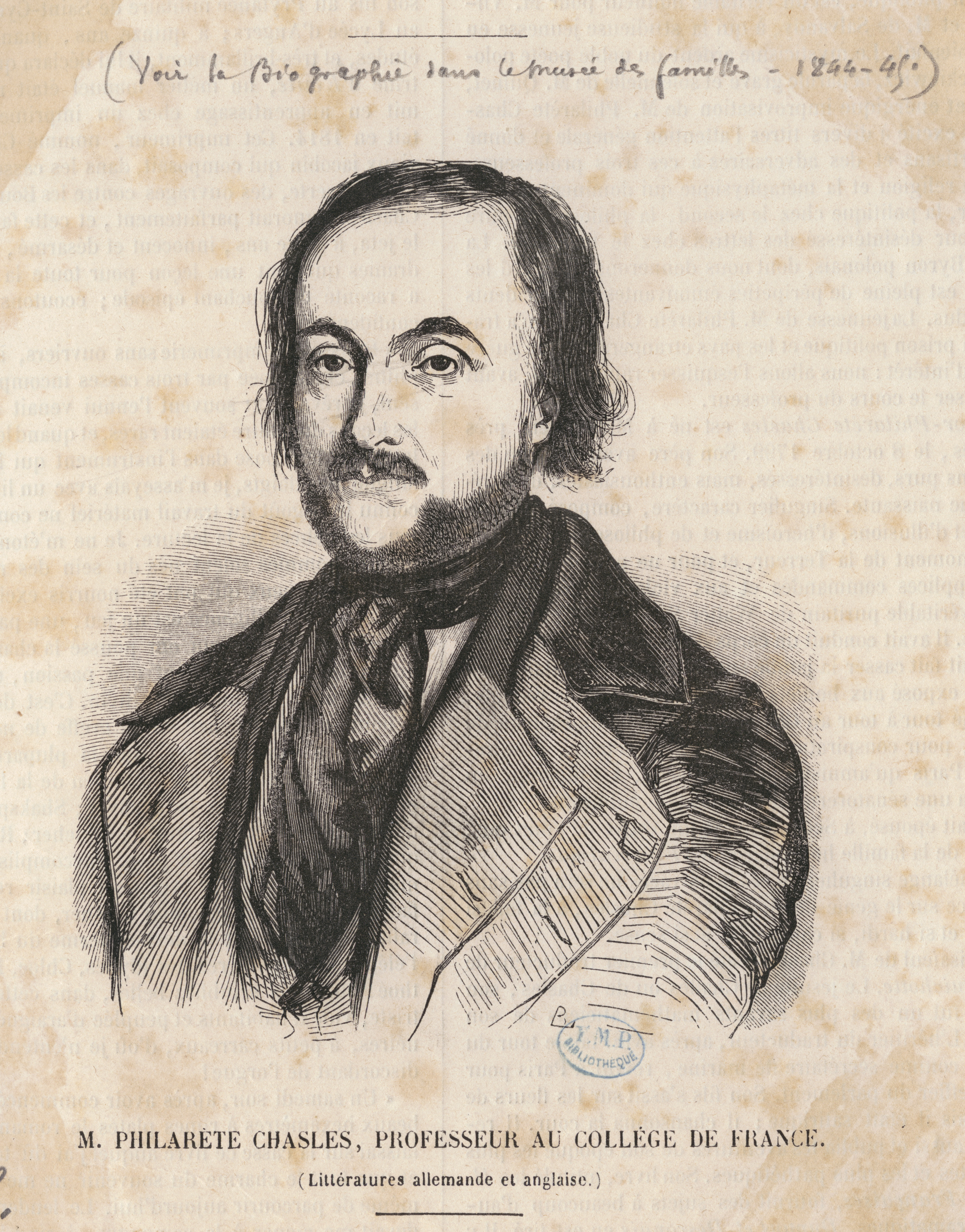
"Mr Philarète Chasles, professor at Collège de France (German and English literature)", before 1844.

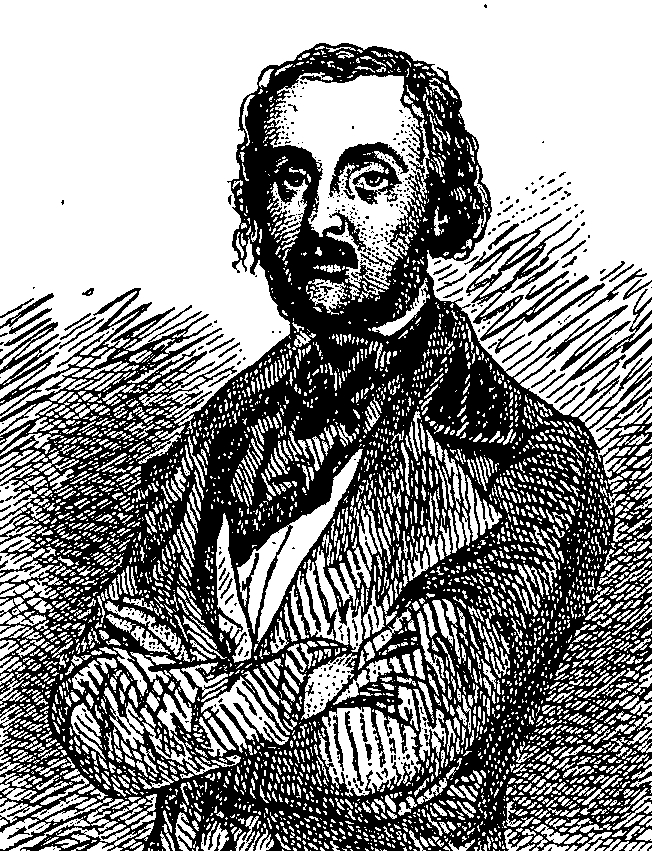
Portrait of Philarète Chasles in Philarète Chasles by Eugène de Mirecourt, 1857.
