= Saint-Aubin-des-Bois =

Saint-Aubin-des-Bois may refer to:

- Saint-Aubin-des-Bois, Calvados
- Saint-Aubin-des-Bois, Eure-et-Loir
