= Simone Segouin =

French Resistance fighter (1925–2023)

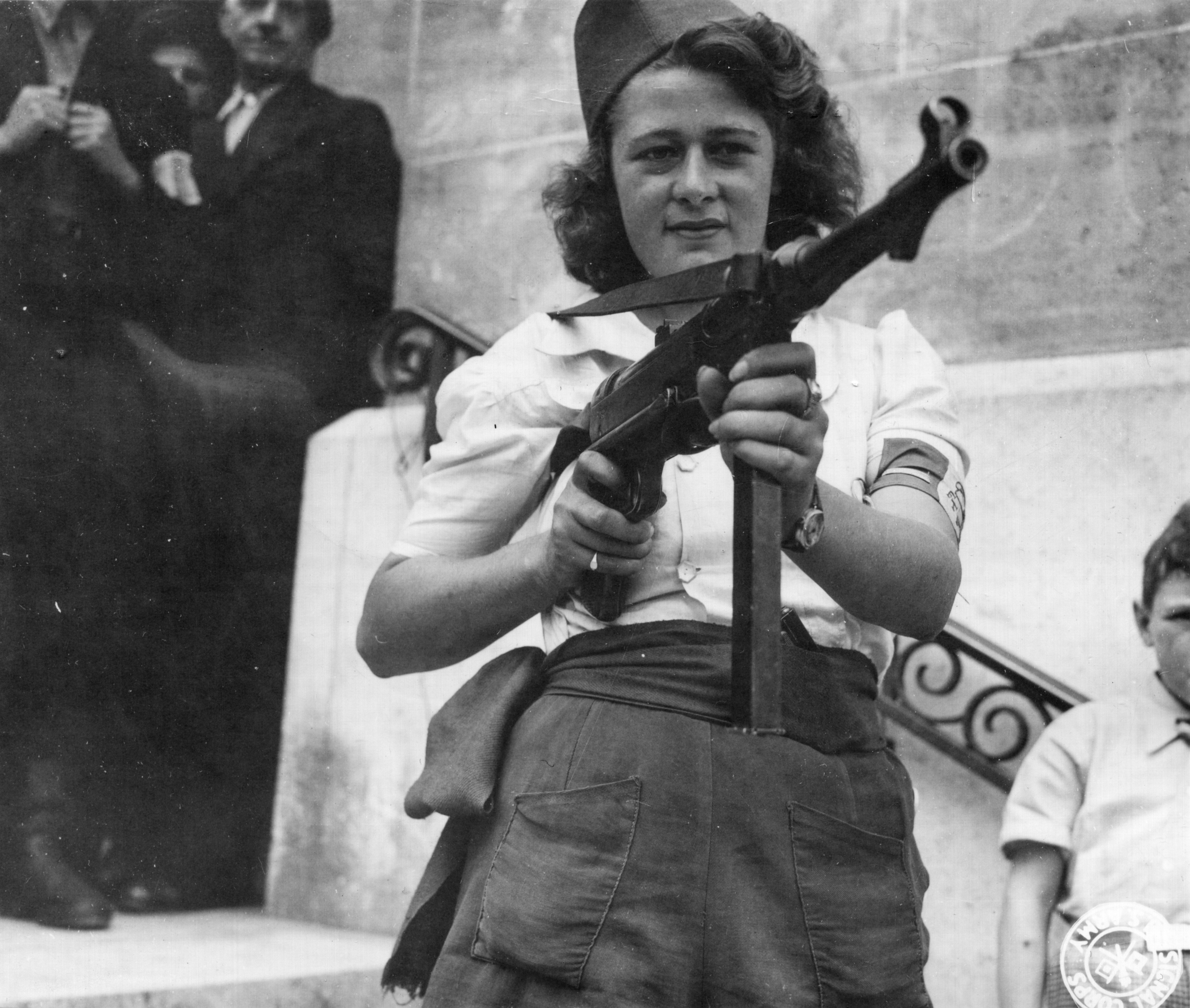
- Segouin in 1944
- Born: 3 October 1925; Thivars, France
- Died: 21 February 2023 (aged 97); Courville-sur-Eure, France
- Other names: Nicole Minet
- Known for: French Resistance fighter

Simone Segouin (French: [simɔn səɡwɛ̃]; 3 October 1925 – 21 February 2023), also known by her nom de guerre Nicole Minet (French: [nikɔl minɛ]), was a French Resistance fighter who served in the Francs-tireurs et partisans group during World War II. Among her first acts of resistance was stealing a bicycle from a German patrol, which she then used to help carry messages. She went on to take part in large-scale or otherwise dangerous missions, such as capturing German troops, derailing trains, and acts of sabotage.

== Early life ==
Segouin was born on 3 October 1925 in Thivars, a French village near Chartres. She grew up alongside three brothers. Her father had been a decorated soldier during World War I. She attended school until the age of 14, at which point she began to work on the family farm.

== The Resistance ==
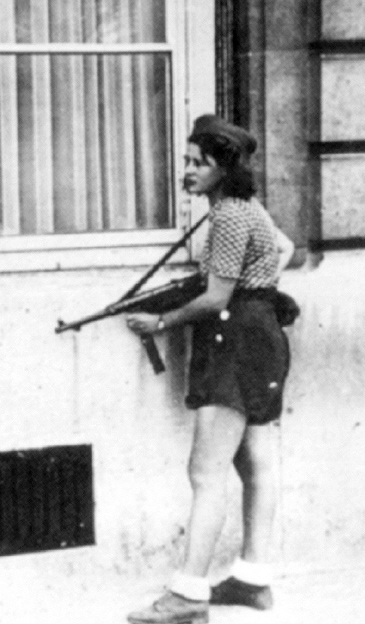
Segouin on 29 August 1944

In an interview with Jack Belden, published in Life magazine in 1944 under the headline "The Girl Partisan of Chartres", Segouin and "Lieutenant Roland" explained that Segouin's involvement with the Resistance arose after the two met when she was 17. The lieutenant instructed her in the use of a submachine gun and introduced Segouin to other group members. In order to join the Francs-Tireurs et Partisans – communist resistance forces – Segouin obtained false identity papers, which established her as Nicole Minet. These papers identified her as being from the port of Dunkirk, which had been bombed early in the war, making it difficult for Germans to verify their authenticity.

Segouin began by acting as a messenger and carrying out other small jobs, and later became more actively involved after participating in a successful "train-exploding expedition". Lieutenant Roland was Roland Boursier, with whom Segouin went on to have six children. The couple never married, and all of the children bore Segouin's name.

Segouin was present at the liberation of Chartres on 23 August 1944 and the liberation of Paris two days later. Of her role in the Resistance, she said:

I was fighting for the resistance, that's all. If I had to start over, I would, because I have no regrets. The Germans were our enemies, we were French.

Segouin gained international fame when photographs of her by American photographer Robert Capa were published in Life weeks after the capture of 25 German soldiers in which she took part. Belden concluded his piece on her by noting:

I could find no trace of what is conventionally called toughness in Nicole. After routine farm life, she finds her present job thrilling and exhilarating. Now that the war is passing beyond her own home district she does not think of going back to the farm. She wants to go on with the Partisans and help free the rest of France.

== Post-war ==
She received the rank of second lieutenant in 1946, and was awarded the decoration of Croix de Guerre for her service in the Resistance. After the war, Segouin became a pediatric nurse in Chartres. A street in Courville-sur-Eure, where she lived, was named for her. In response to the honour, Segouin said, "I'm very glad to know that people are not indifferent to this period of my life." In 2020, the village hall in Thivars was named for Segouin. She was the subject of a French documentary in 2021, broadcast on RMC Découverte. On 14 July 2021, she was appointed a Knight of the Legion of Honour, France's highest order of merit.

Segouin died on 21 February 2023, at age 97.

== See also ==
- Andrée Borrel
- Denise Bloch
- Lise de Baissac
- Jeannette Guyot
