= Amilly =

Amilly is the name of the following communes in France:

- Amilly, Eure-et-Loir, in the Eure-et-Loir department
- Amilly, Loiret, in the Loiret department
