= Bonce =

Bonce may refer to:

- Boncé, France
- Bonče, Republic of Macedonia
