= Thivars =

- Commune
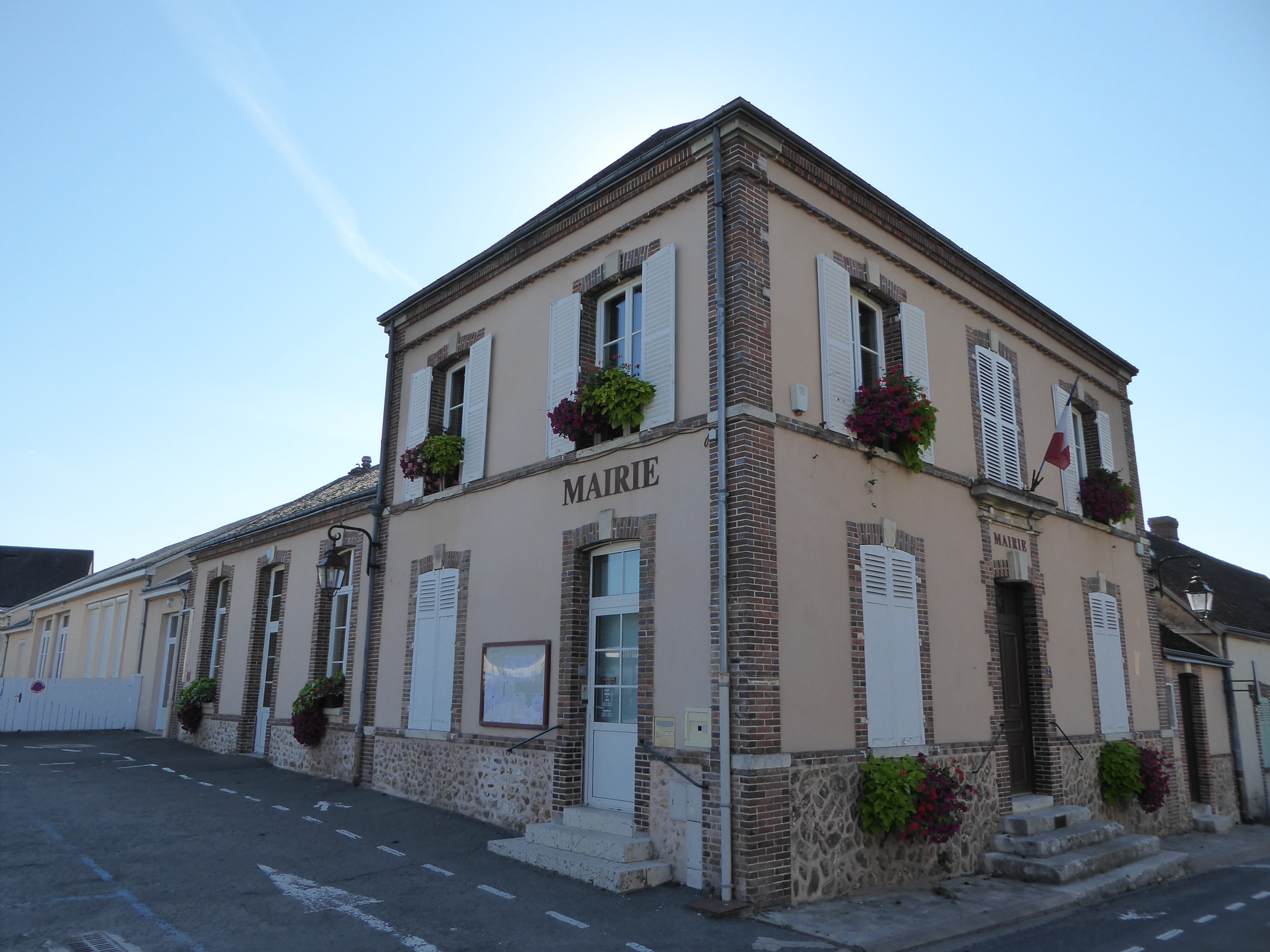
- The town hall in Thivars
- Location of Thivars
- Location within France Location within Centre-Val de Loire
- Coordinates: 48°22′46″N 1°27′05″E
- Country: France
- Region: Centre-Val de Loire
- Department: Eure-et-Loir
- Arrondissement: Chartres
- Canton: Chartres-2
- Intercommunality: CA Chartres Métropole

Government
  - Mayor (2020–2026): Olivier Soufflet
- Area^{1}: 9.22 km^{2} (3.56 sq mi)
- Elevation: 137 m (449 ft)
- Highest elevation: 161 m (528 ft)
- Lowest elevation: 131 m (430 ft)
- Population (2023): 1,119
  - Density: 121/km^{2} (314/sq mi)
- Time zone: UTC+01:00 (CET)
  - Summer (DST): UTC+02:00 (CEST)
- INSEE/Postal code: 28388 /28630
- ^{1} French Land Register data, which excludes lakes, ponds, glaciers > 1 km^{2} (0.386 sq mi or 247 acres) and river estuaries.

Thivars (French pronunciation: [tivaʁ]) is a commune in the Eure-et-Loir department in northern France.

== Population ==
Historical population
Year	Pop.	±% p.a.
1968	533	—
1975	835	+6.62%
1982	859	+0.41%
1990	975	+1.60%
1999	959	−0.18%
2007	974	+0.19%
2012	1,019	+0.91%
2017	1,059	+0.77%
2023	1,119	+0.92%
Source: INSEE

== Notable people ==
- Simone Segouin (1925–2023), French resistance fighter.

== See also ==
- Communes of the Eure-et-Loir department
