= Canton of Chartres-3 =

Coordinates: 48.45°N 1.48°E

The canton of Chartres-3 is an administrative division of the Eure-et-Loir department, northern France. It was created at the French canton reorganisation which came into effect in March 2015. Its seat is in Chartres.

It consists of the following communes:

1. Bailleau-l'Évêque
2. Chartres (partly)
3. Lèves
4. Mainvilliers
5. Saint-Aubin-des-Bois
