= Mignières =

- Commune
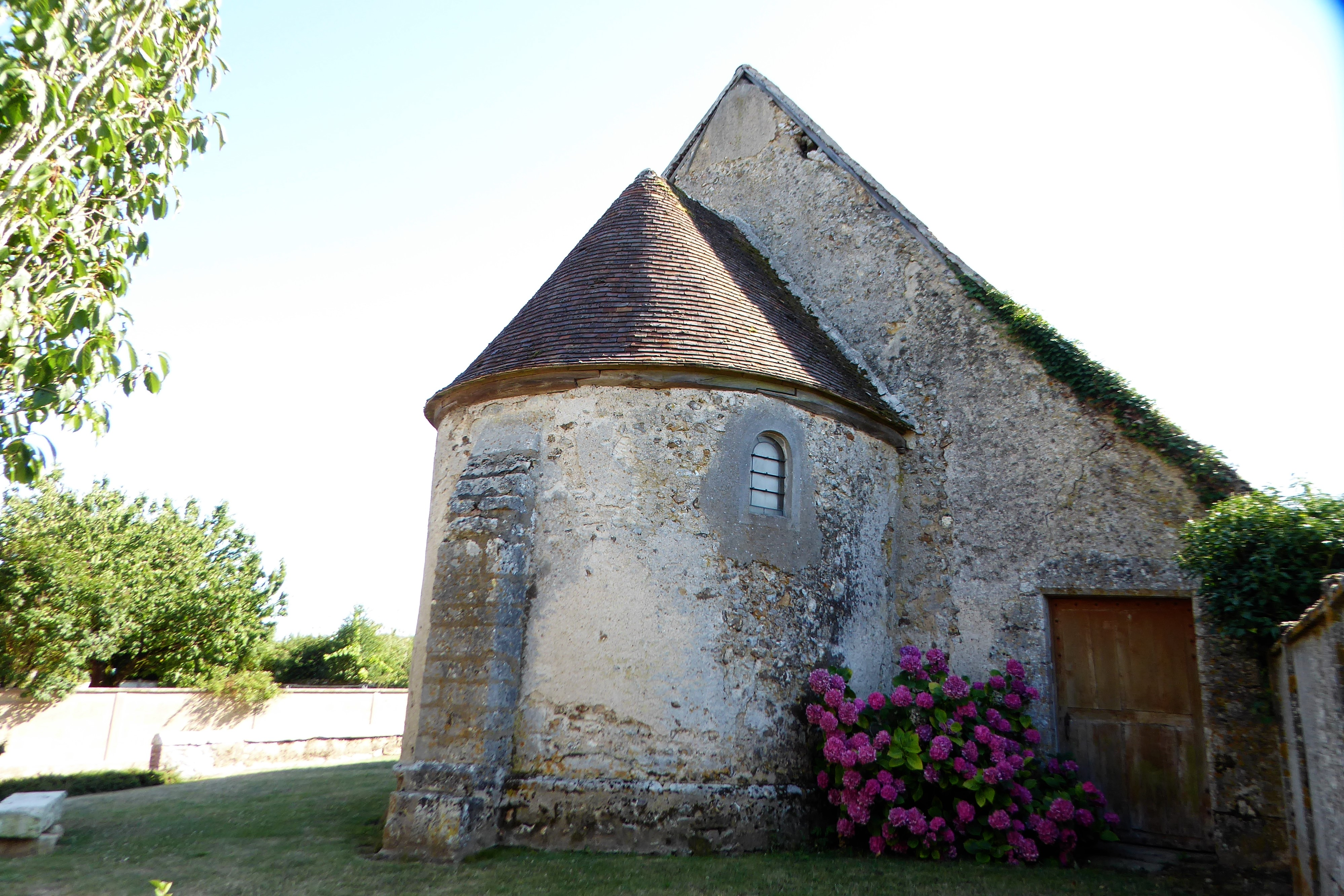
- The chapel in Mignières
- Location of Mignières
- Location within France Location within Centre-Val de Loire
- Coordinates: 48°21′37″N 1°25′46″E
- Country: France
- Region: Centre-Val de Loire
- Department: Eure-et-Loir
- Arrondissement: Chartres
- Canton: Chartres-2
- Intercommunality: CA Chartres Métropole

Government
  - Mayor (2020–2026): Didier Garnier
- Area^{1}: 13.04 km^{2} (5.03 sq mi)
- Elevation: 163 m (535 ft)
- Highest elevation: 168 m (551 ft)
- Lowest elevation: 136 m (446 ft)
- Population (2023): 1,163
  - Density: 89.19/km^{2} (231.0/sq mi)
- Time zone: UTC+01:00 (CET)
  - Summer (DST): UTC+02:00 (CEST)
- INSEE/Postal code: 28253 /28630
- ^{1} French Land Register data, which excludes lakes, ponds, glaciers > 1 km^{2} (0.386 sq mi or 247 acres) and river estuaries.

Mignières (French pronunciation: [miɲɛʁ]) is a commune in the Eure-et-Loir department in northern France.

== Population ==
Historical population
Year	Pop.	±% p.a.
1968	383	—
1975	392	+0.33%
1982	695	+8.52%
1990	641	−1.01%
1999	682	+0.69%
2007	706	+0.43%
2012	891	+4.76%
2017	1,057	+3.48%
2023	1,163	+1.61%
Source: INSEE

== See also ==
- Communes of the Eure-et-Loir department
