= Nogent-sur-Eure =

- Commune
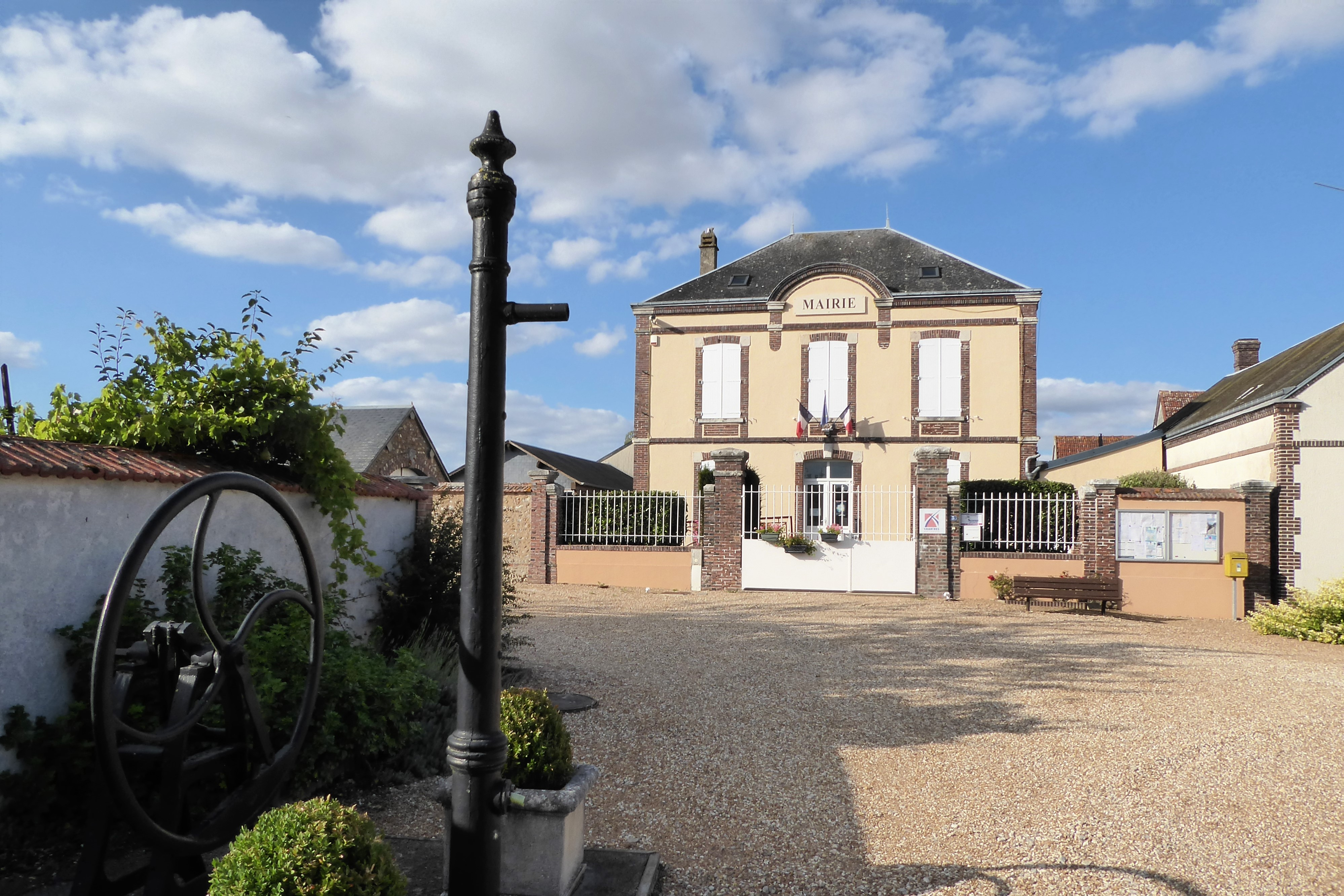
- The town hall in Nogent-sur-Eure
- Location of Nogent-sur-Eure
- Location within France Location within Centre-Val de Loire
- Coordinates: 48°23′24″N 1°21′48″E
- Country: France
- Region: Centre-Val de Loire
- Department: Eure-et-Loir
- Arrondissement: Chartres
- Canton: Illiers-Combray
- Intercommunality: CA Chartres Métropole

Government
  - Mayor (2020–2026): Pascal Leclair
- Area^{1}: 9.22 km^{2} (3.56 sq mi)
- Elevation: 165 m (541 ft)
- Highest elevation: 174 m (571 ft)
- Lowest elevation: 137 m (449 ft)
- Population (2023): 510
  - Density: 55/km^{2} (140/sq mi)
- Time zone: UTC+01:00 (CET)
  - Summer (DST): UTC+02:00 (CEST)
- INSEE/Postal code: 28281 /28120
- ^{1} French Land Register data, which excludes lakes, ponds, glaciers > 1 km^{2} (0.386 sq mi or 247 acres) and river estuaries.

Nogent-sur-Eure (French pronunciation: [nɔʒɑ̃ syʁ œʁ], literally Nogent on Eure) is a commune in the Eure-et-Loir department in northern France.

== Population ==
Historical population
Year	Pop.	±% p.a.
1968	231	—
1975	292	+3.40%
1982	359	+2.99%
1990	424	+2.10%
1999	441	+0.44%
2007	486	+1.22%
2012	515	+1.17%
2017	497	−0.71%
2023	510	+0.43%
Source: INSEE

== See also ==
- Communes of the Eure-et-Loir department
