= Allonnes, Eure-et-Loir =

Allonnes
- Commune
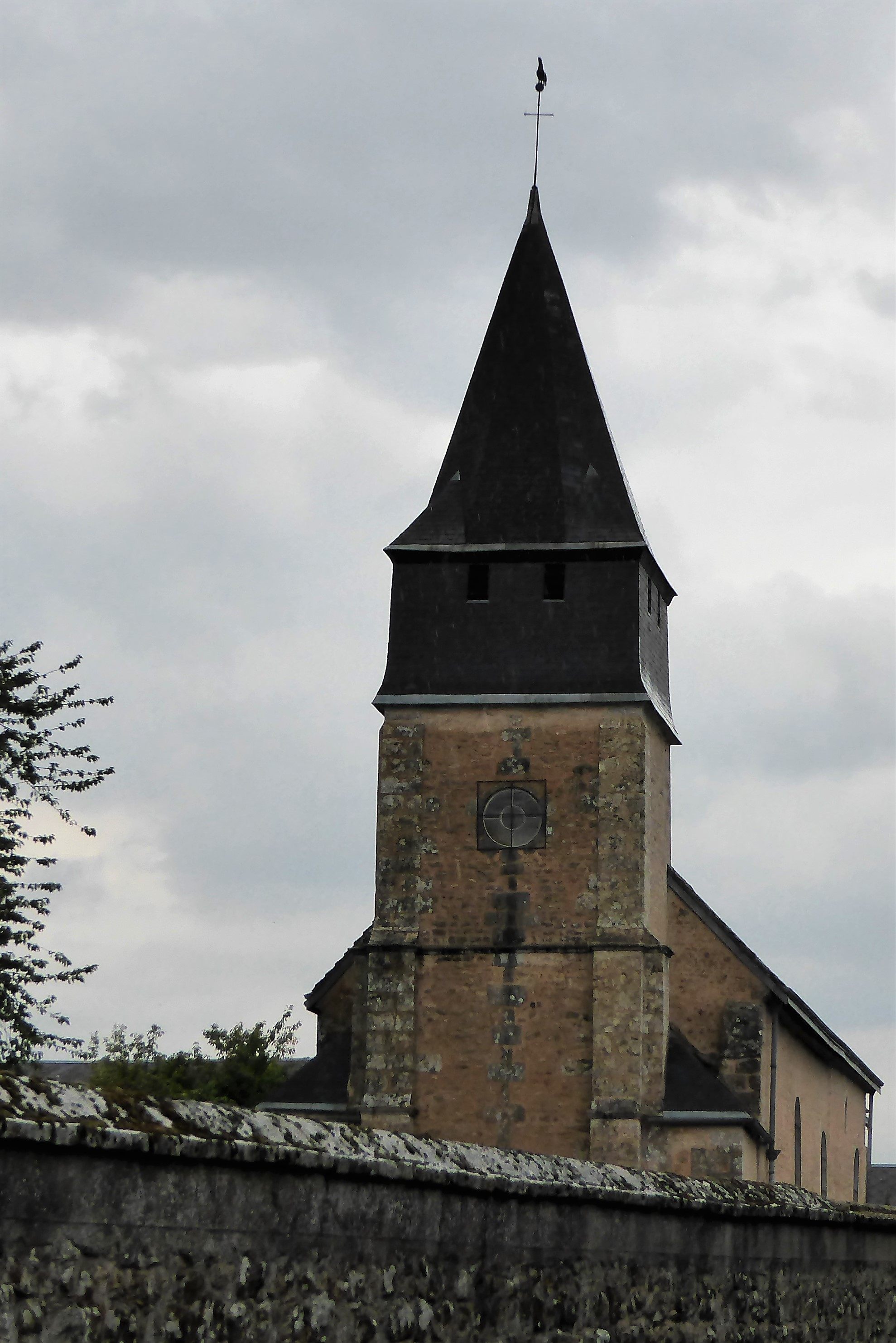
- The church in Allonnes

- Coat of arms
- Location of Allonnes
- Location within France Location within Centre-Val de Loire
- Coordinates: 48°19′52″N 1°39′28″E
- Country: France
- Region: Centre-Val de Loire
- Department: Eure-et-Loir
- Arrondissement: Chartres
- Canton: Les Villages Vovéens
- Intercommunality: CA Chartres Métropole

Government
  - Mayor (2020–2026): Claude Gallet
- Area^{1}: 10.25 km^{2} (3.96 sq mi)
- Elevation: 139 m (456 ft)
- Highest elevation: 154 m (505 ft)
- Lowest elevation: 141 m (463 ft)
- Population (2023): 321
  - Density: 31.3/km^{2} (81.1/sq mi)
- Time zone: UTC+01:00 (CET)
  - Summer (DST): UTC+02:00 (CEST)
- INSEE/Postal code: 28004 /28150
- ^{1} French Land Register data, which excludes lakes, ponds, glaciers > 1 km^{2} (0.386 sq mi or 247 acres) and river estuaries.

Allonnes (French pronunciation: [alɔn]) is a commune in the Eure-et-Loir department in northern France.

== Population ==
Historical population
Year	Pop.	±% p.a.
1968	222	—
1975	188	−2.35%
1982	168	−1.59%
1990	252	+5.20%
1999	264	+0.52%
2007	302	+1.70%
2012	333	+1.97%
2017	313	−1.23%
2023	321	+0.42%
Source: INSEE

== See also ==
- Communes of the Eure-et-Loir department
