= Barjouville =

- Commune
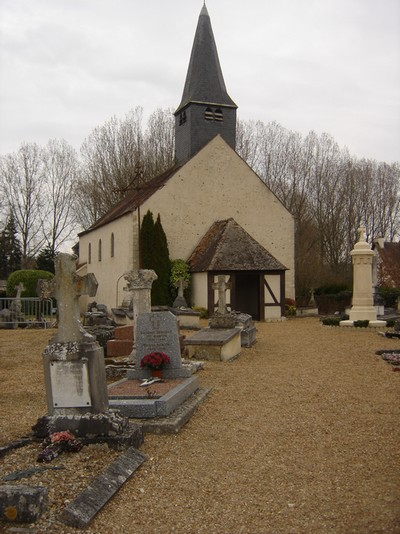
- The church in Barjouville

- Coat of arms
- Location of Barjouville
- Location within France Location within Centre-Val de Loire
- Coordinates: 48°24′34″N 1°28′41″E
- Country: France
- Region: Centre-Val de Loire
- Department: Eure-et-Loir
- Arrondissement: Chartres
- Canton: Lucé
- Intercommunality: CA Chartres Métropole

Government
  - Mayor (2020–2026): Benoît Delatouche
- Area^{1}: 4.1 km^{2} (1.6 sq mi)
- Elevation: 130 m (430 ft)
- Highest elevation: 157 m (515 ft)
- Lowest elevation: 126 m (413 ft)
- Population (2023): 1,742
  - Density: 420/km^{2} (1,100/sq mi)
- Time zone: UTC+01:00 (CET)
  - Summer (DST): UTC+02:00 (CEST)
- INSEE/Postal code: 28024 /28630
- ^{1} French Land Register data, which excludes lakes, ponds, glaciers > 1 km^{2} (0.386 sq mi or 247 acres) and river estuaries.

Barjouville (French pronunciation: [baʁʒuvil]) is a commune in the Eure-et-Loir department in north-central France.

== Population ==
Historical population
Year	Pop.	±% p.a.
1968	354	—
1975	697	+10.16%
1982	975	+4.91%
1990	1,306	+3.72%
1999	1,393	+0.72%
2007	1,612	+1.84%
2012	1,660	+0.59%
2017	1,712	+0.62%
2023	1,742	+0.29%
Source: INSEE

== See also ==
- Communes of the Eure-et-Loir department
