= Morancez =

- Commune
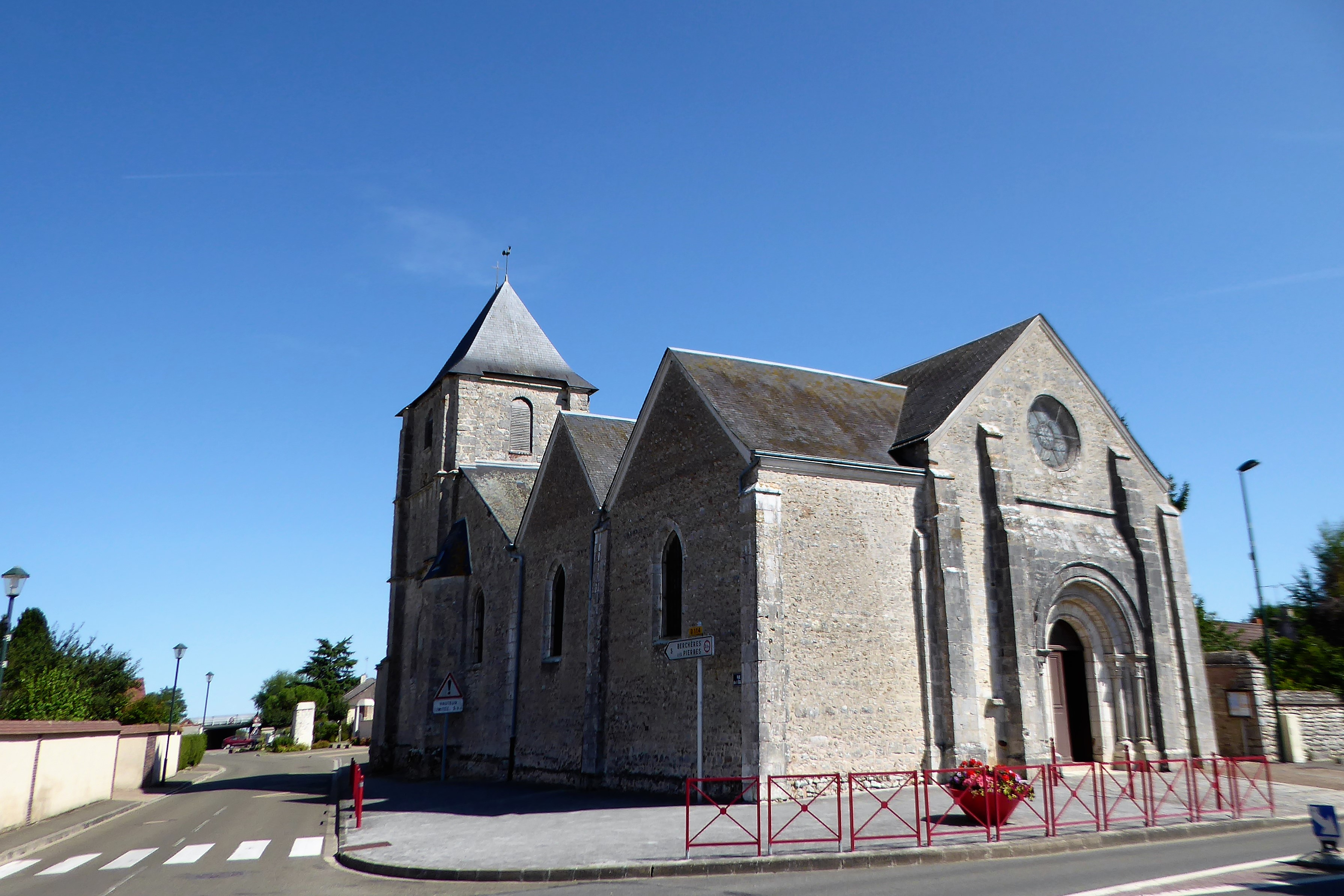
- The church in Morancez
- Location of Morancez
- Location within France Location within Centre-Val de Loire
- Coordinates: 48°23′53″N 1°29′39″E
- Country: France
- Region: Centre-Val de Loire
- Department: Eure-et-Loir
- Arrondissement: Chartres
- Canton: Chartres-2
- Intercommunality: CA Chartres Métropole

Government
  - Mayor (2020–2026): Gérard Besnard
- Area^{1}: 7.13 km^{2} (2.75 sq mi)
- Elevation: 130 m (430 ft)
- Highest elevation: 149 m (489 ft)
- Lowest elevation: 125 m (410 ft)
- Population (2023): 1,935
  - Density: 271/km^{2} (703/sq mi)
- Time zone: UTC+01:00 (CET)
  - Summer (DST): UTC+02:00 (CEST)
- INSEE/Postal code: 28269 /28630
- ^{1} French Land Register data, which excludes lakes, ponds, glaciers > 1 km^{2} (0.386 sq mi or 247 acres) and river estuaries.

Morancez (French pronunciation: [mɔʁɑ̃se]) is a commune in the Eure-et-Loir department in northern France.

== Population ==
Historical population
Year	Pop.	±% p.a.
1968	570	—
1975	723	+3.46%
1982	1,169	+7.11%
1990	1,692	+4.73%
1999	1,615	−0.52%
2007	1,517	−0.78%
2012	1,629	+1.43%
2017	1,836	+2.42%
2023	1,935	+0.88%
Source: INSEE

== See also ==
- Communes of the Eure-et-Loir department
