= Fresnay-le-Comte =

- Commune
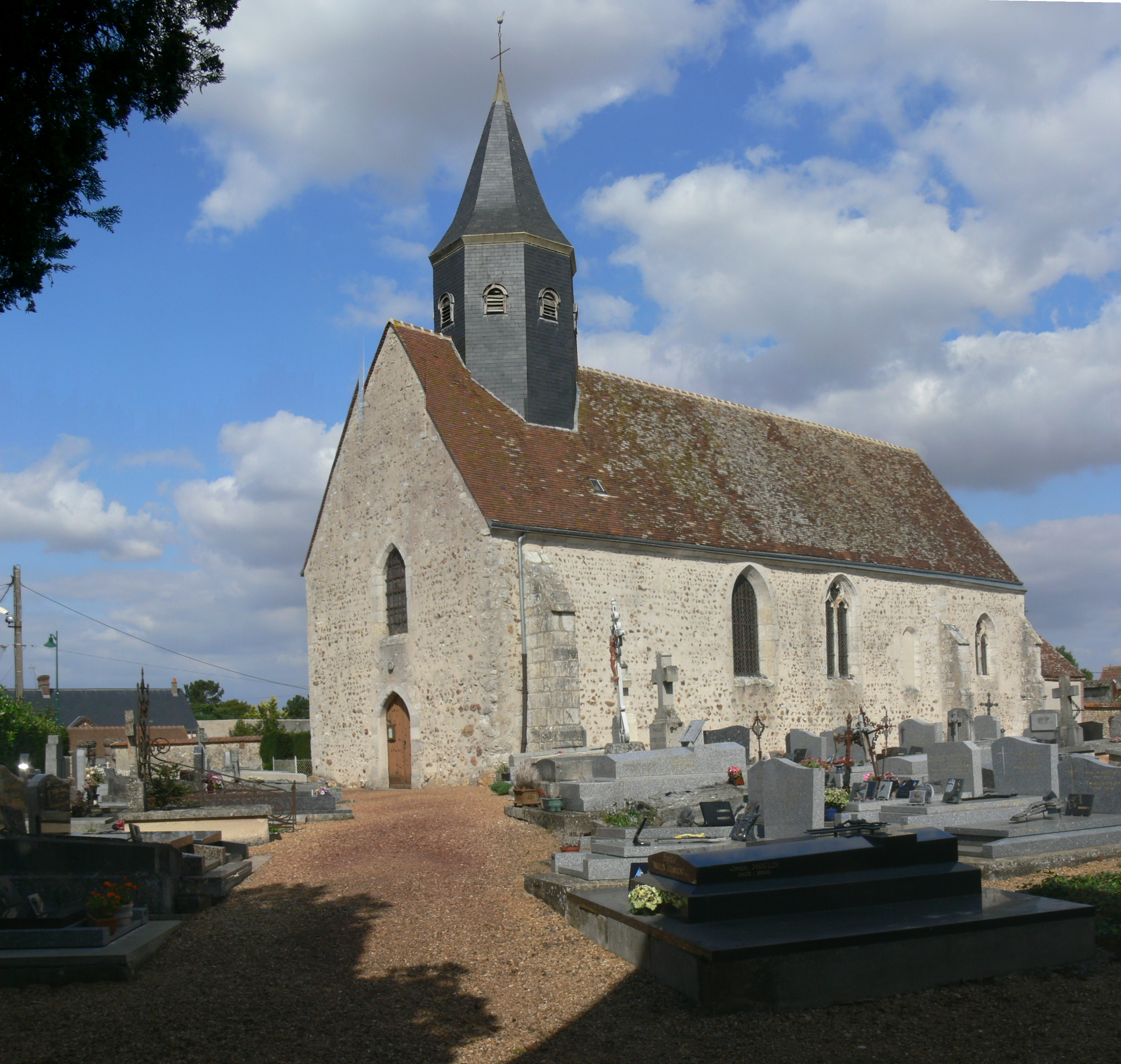
- The church in Fresnay-le-Comte
- Location of Fresnay-le-Comte
- Location within France Location within Centre-Val de Loire
- Coordinates: 48°18′10″N 1°28′39″E
- Country: France
- Region: Centre-Val de Loire
- Department: Eure-et-Loir
- Arrondissement: Chartres
- Canton: Chartres-2
- Intercommunality: CA Chartres Métropole

Government
  - Mayor (2020–2026): Gilles Péan
- Area^{1}: 8.25 km^{2} (3.19 sq mi)
- Elevation: 153 m (502 ft)
- Highest elevation: 156 m (512 ft)
- Lowest elevation: 139 m (456 ft)
- Population (2023): 281
  - Density: 34.1/km^{2} (88.2/sq mi)
- Time zone: UTC+01:00 (CET)
  - Summer (DST): UTC+02:00 (CEST)
- INSEE/Postal code: 28162 /28360
- ^{1} French Land Register data, which excludes lakes, ponds, glaciers > 1 km^{2} (0.386 sq mi or 247 acres) and river estuaries.

Fresnay-le-Comte (French pronunciation: [fʁɛnɛ lə kɔ̃t]) is a commune in the Eure-et-Loir department in northern France.

== Population ==
Historical population
Year	Pop.	±% p.a.
1968	246	—
1975	265	+1.07%
1982	261	−0.22%
1990	308	+2.09%
1999	317	+0.32%
2007	315	−0.08%
2012	348	+2.01%
2017	326	−1.30%
2023	281	−2.45%
Source: INSEE

== See also ==
- Communes of the Eure-et-Loir department
