= Dammarie, Eure-et-Loir =

Dammarie
- Commune
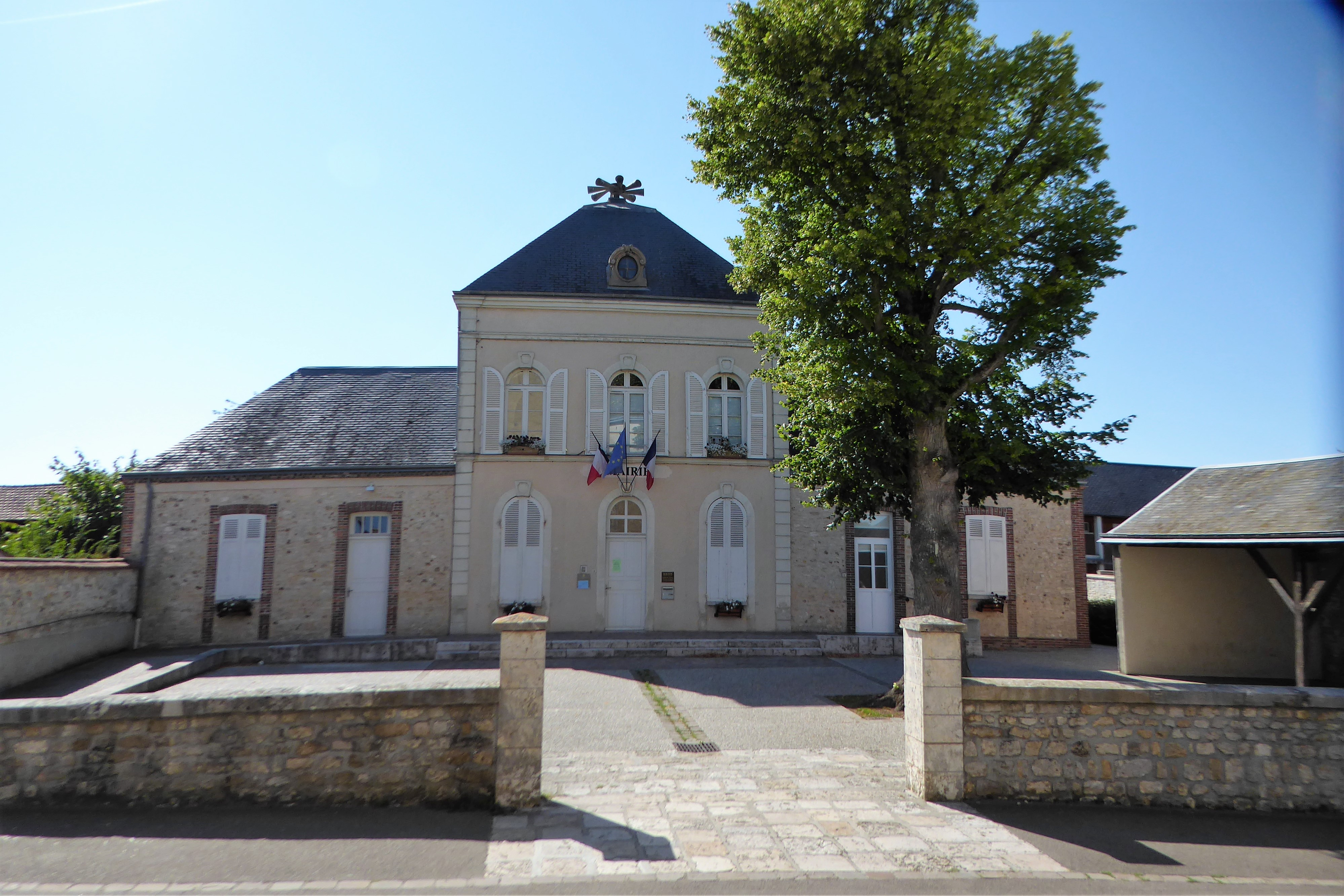
- The town hall in Dammarie

- Coat of arms
- Location of Dammarie
- Location within France Location within Centre-Val de Loire
- Coordinates: 48°20′36″N 1°29′41″E
- Country: France
- Region: Centre-Val de Loire
- Department: Eure-et-Loir
- Arrondissement: Chartres
- Canton: Chartres-2
- Intercommunality: CA Chartres Métropole

Government
  - Mayor (2020–2026): Annick Lhermitte
- Area^{1}: 32.37 km^{2} (12.50 sq mi)
- Elevation: 164 m (538 ft)
- Highest elevation: 164 m (538 ft)
- Lowest elevation: 136 m (446 ft)
- Population (2023): 1,505
  - Density: 46.49/km^{2} (120.4/sq mi)
- Time zone: UTC+01:00 (CET)
  - Summer (DST): UTC+02:00 (CEST)
- INSEE/Postal code: 28122 /28360
- ^{1} French Land Register data, which excludes lakes, ponds, glaciers > 1 km^{2} (0.386 sq mi or 247 acres) and river estuaries.

Dammarie (French pronunciation: [damaʁi]) is a commune in the Eure-et-Loir department in northern France.

== Population ==
Historical population
Year	Pop.	±% p.a.
1968	793	—
1975	928	+2.27%
1982	1,171	+3.38%
1990	1,333	+1.63%
1999	1,371	+0.31%
2007	1,520	+1.30%
2012	1,535	+0.20%
2017	1,512	−0.30%
2023	1,505	−0.08%
Source: INSEE

== See also ==
- Communes of the Eure-et-Loir department
