= La Bourdinière-Saint-Loup =

- Commune
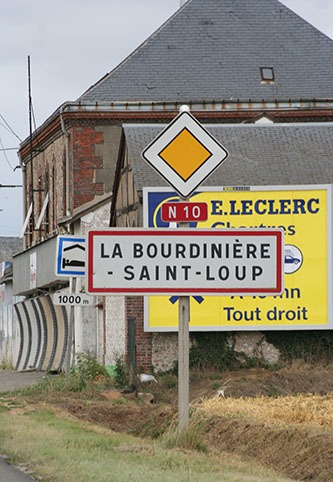
- A sign showing the entrance to La Bourdinière-Saint-Loup

- Coat of arms
- Location of La Bourdinière-Saint-Loup
- Location within France Location within Centre-Val de Loire
- Coordinates: 48°19′03″N 1°25′41″E
- Country: France
- Region: Centre-Val de Loire
- Department: Eure-et-Loir
- Arrondissement: Chartres
- Canton: Chartres-2
- Intercommunality: CA Chartres Métropole

Government
  - Mayor (2020–2026): Marc Lecoeur
- Area^{1}: 20.16 km^{2} (7.78 sq mi)
- Elevation: 155 m (509 ft)
- Highest elevation: 166 m (545 ft)
- Lowest elevation: 148 m (486 ft)
- Population (2023): 741
  - Density: 36.8/km^{2} (95.2/sq mi)
- Time zone: UTC+01:00 (CET)
  - Summer (DST): UTC+02:00 (CEST)
- INSEE/Postal code: 28048 /28360
- ^{1} French Land Register data, which excludes lakes, ponds, glaciers > 1 km^{2} (0.386 sq mi or 247 acres) and river estuaries.

La Bourdinière-Saint-Loup (French pronunciation: [la buʁdinjɛʁ sɛ̃ lu]) is a commune in the Eure-et-Loir department in northern France. It was created in 1972 by the merger of two former communes: Boisvillette and Saint-Loup.

== Population ==
Historical population
Year	Pop.	±% p.a.
1968	372	—
1975	334	−1.53%
1982	366	+1.32%
1990	455	+2.76%
1999	482	+0.64%
2007	535	+1.31%
2012	621	+3.03%
2017	725	+3.15%
2023	741	+0.36%
Source: INSEE

== See also ==
- Communes of the Eure-et-Loir department
