= Canton of Lucé =

Coordinates: 48.43°N 1.45°E

The canton of Lucé is an administrative division of the Eure-et-Loir department, northern France. Its borders were modified at the French canton reorganisation which came into effect in March 2015. Its seat is in Lucé.

It consists of the following communes:

1. Amilly
2. Barjouville
3. Cintray
4. Fontenay-sur-Eure
5. Lucé
6. Luisant
