= Vitray-en-Beauce =

- Commune
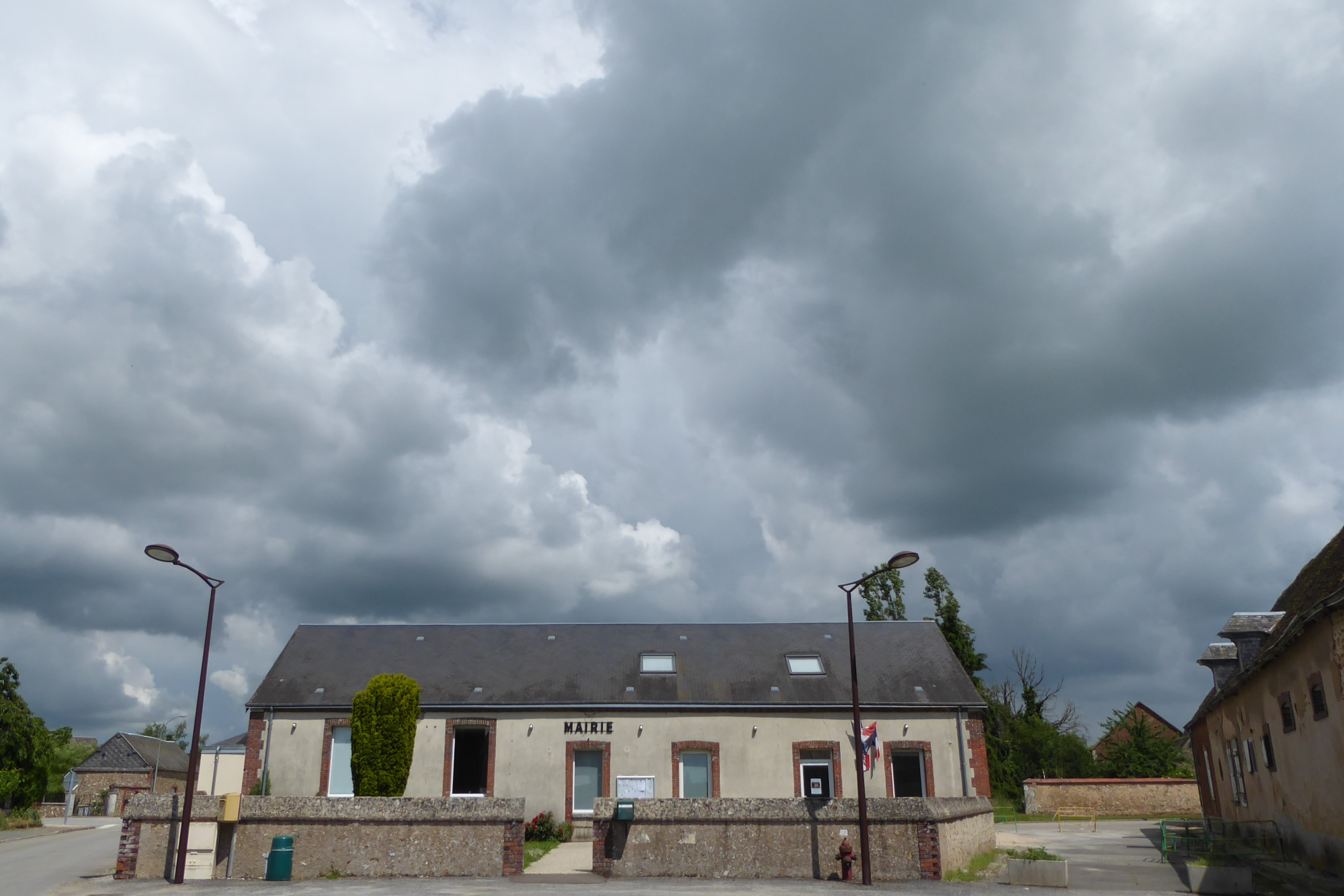
- The town hall in Vitray-en-Beauce
- Location of Vitray-en-Beauce
- Location within France Location within Centre-Val de Loire
- Coordinates: 48°16′39″N 1°25′16″E
- Country: France
- Region: Centre-Val de Loire
- Department: Eure-et-Loir
- Arrondissement: Châteaudun
- Canton: Les Villages Vovéens
- Intercommunality: CA Chartres Métropole

Government
  - Mayor (2020–2026): Eric Delahaye
- Area^{1}: 10.92 km^{2} (4.22 sq mi)
- Elevation: 156 m (512 ft)
- Highest elevation: 157 m (515 ft)
- Lowest elevation: 133 m (436 ft)
- Population (2023): 346
  - Density: 31.7/km^{2} (82.1/sq mi)
- Time zone: UTC+01:00 (CET)
  - Summer (DST): UTC+02:00 (CEST)
- INSEE/Postal code: 28419 /28360
- ^{1} French Land Register data, which excludes lakes, ponds, glaciers > 1 km^{2} (0.386 sq mi or 247 acres) and river estuaries.

Vitray-en-Beauce (French pronunciation: [vitʁɛ ɑ̃ bos], literally Vitray in Beauce) is a commune in the Eure-et-Loir department in northern France.

== Population ==
Historical population
| Year | Pop. | ±% p.a. |
|---|---|---|
| 1968 | 206 | — |
| 1975 | 173 | −2.46% |
| 1982 | 182 | +0.73% |
| 1990 | 204 | +1.44% |
| 1999 | 289 | +3.95% |
| 2007 | 309 | +0.84% |
| 2012 | 361 | +3.16% |
| 2017 | 357 | −0.22% |
| 2023 | 346 | −0.52% |
Source: INSEE

== See also ==
- Communes of the Eure-et-Loir department
