= Corancez =

- Commune
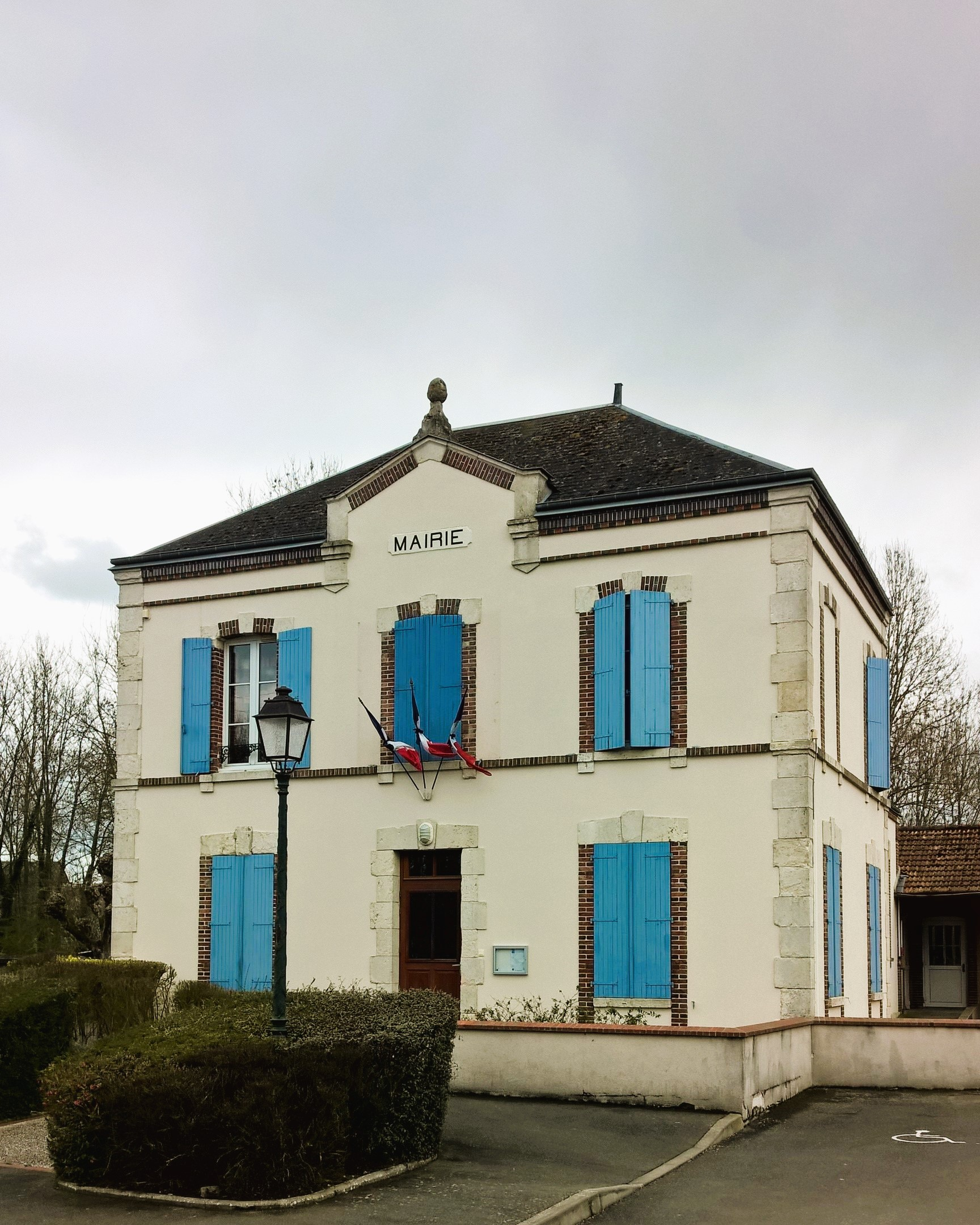
- The town hall in Corancez
- Location of Corancez
- Location within France Location within Centre-Val de Loire
- Coordinates: 48°22′05″N 1°31′00″E
- Country: France
- Region: Centre-Val de Loire
- Department: Eure-et-Loir
- Arrondissement: Chartres
- Canton: Chartres-2
- Intercommunality: CA Chartres Métropole

Government
  - Mayor (2020–2026): Alain Choupart
- Area^{1}: 6.8 km^{2} (2.6 sq mi)
- Elevation: 140 m (460 ft)
- Highest elevation: 152 m (499 ft)
- Lowest elevation: 133 m (436 ft)
- Population (2023): 372
  - Density: 55/km^{2} (140/sq mi)
- Time zone: UTC+01:00 (CET)
  - Summer (DST): UTC+02:00 (CEST)
- INSEE/Postal code: 28107 /28630
- ^{1} French Land Register data, which excludes lakes, ponds, glaciers > 1 km^{2} (0.386 sq mi or 247 acres) and river estuaries.

Corancez (French pronunciation: [kɔʁɑ̃se]) is a commune in the Eure-et-Loir department in northern France.

== Population ==
Historical population
Year	Pop.	±% p.a.
1968	141	—
1975	167	+2.45%
1982	385	+12.67%
1990	420	+1.09%
1999	458	+0.97%
2007	411	−1.34%
2012	397	−0.69%
2017	378	−0.98%
2023	372	−0.27%
Source: INSEE

== See also ==
- Communes of the Eure-et-Loir department
