= Lucé, Eure-et-Loir =

Lucé
- Commune
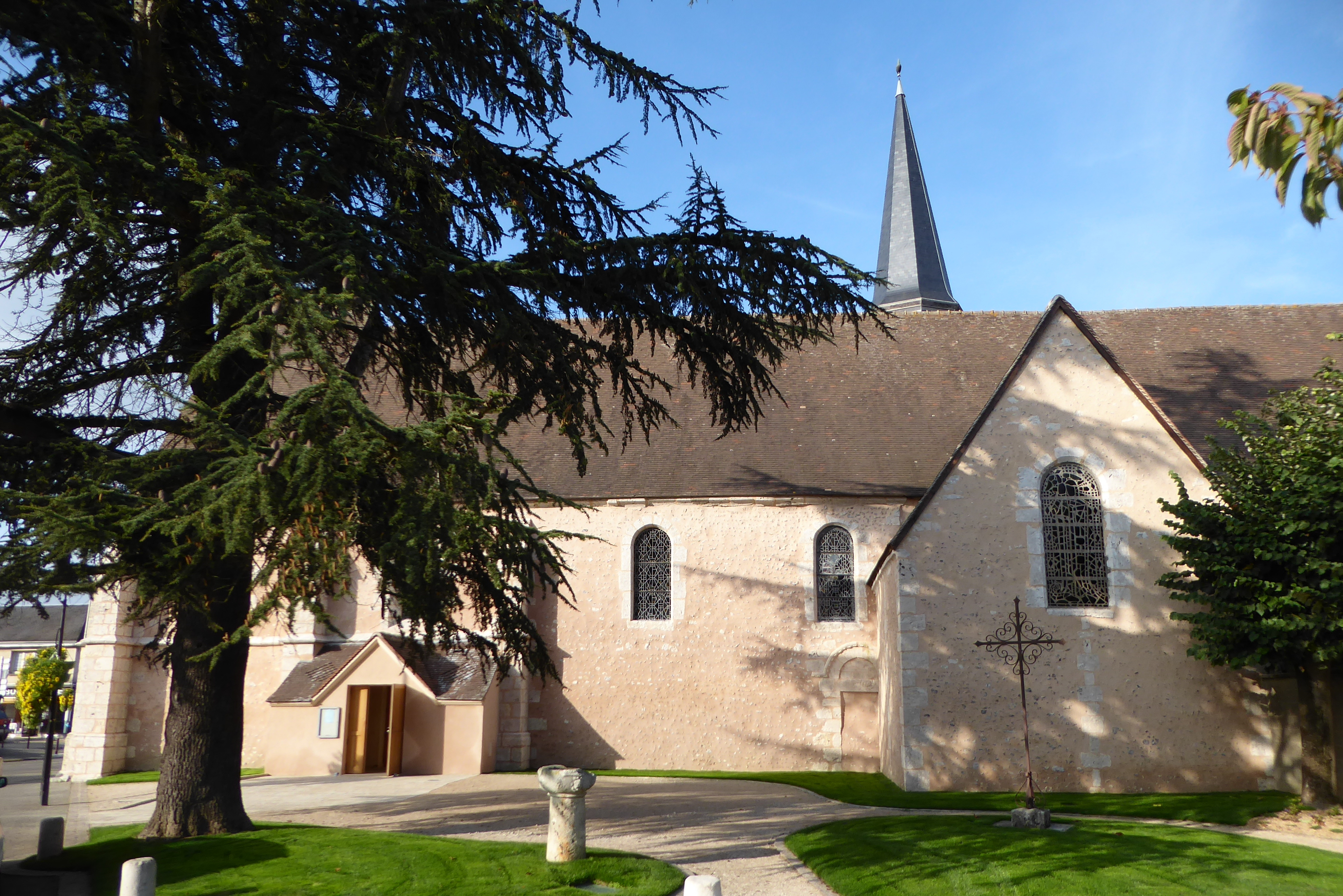
- The church in Lucé

- Coat of arms
- Location of Lucé
- Location within France Location within Centre-Val de Loire
- Coordinates: 48°26′20″N 1°27′57″E
- Country: France
- Region: Centre-Val de Loire
- Department: Eure-et-Loir
- Arrondissement: Chartres
- Canton: Lucé
- Intercommunality: CA Chartres Métropole

Government
  - Mayor (2020–2026): Florent Gauthier
- Area^{1}: 6.06 km^{2} (2.34 sq mi)
- Elevation: 157 m (515 ft)
- Highest elevation: 162 m (531 ft)
- Lowest elevation: 142 m (466 ft)
- Population (2023): 15,921
  - Density: 2,630/km^{2} (6,800/sq mi)
- Time zone: UTC+01:00 (CET)
  - Summer (DST): UTC+02:00 (CEST)
- INSEE/Postal code: 28218 /28110
- Website: Official website
- ^{1} French Land Register data, which excludes lakes, ponds, glaciers > 1 km^{2} (0.386 sq mi or 247 acres) and river estuaries.

Lucé (French pronunciation: [lyse]) is a commune in the Eure-et-Loir department in northern France.

== Population ==
Historical population

Year	Pop.	±% p.a.
1836	414	—
1841	413	−0.05%
1846	436	+1.09%
1851	484	+2.11%
1856	463	−0.88%
1861	494	+1.30%
1866	497	+0.12%
1872	530	+1.08%
1876	493	−1.79%
1881	532	+1.53%
1886	645	+3.93%
1891	658	+0.40%
1896	698	+1.19%
1901	800	+2.77%
1906	812	+0.30%
1911	948	+3.15%

Year	Pop.	±% p.a.
1921	1,262	+2.90%
1926	1,283	+0.33%
1931	1,505	+3.24%
1936	1,497	−0.11%
1946	2,030	+3.09%
1954	3,303	+6.27%
1962	6,555	+8.95%
1968	11,085	+9.15%
1975	13,721	+3.09%
1982	17,433	+3.48%
1990	18,796	+0.95%
1999	17,701	−0.66%
2007	15,747	−1.45%
2012	16,551	+1.00%
2017	15,404	−1.43%
2023	15,921	+0.55%

Source: EHESS and INSEE

== See also ==
- Communes of the Eure-et-Loir department
