= Ver-lès-Chartres =

- Commune
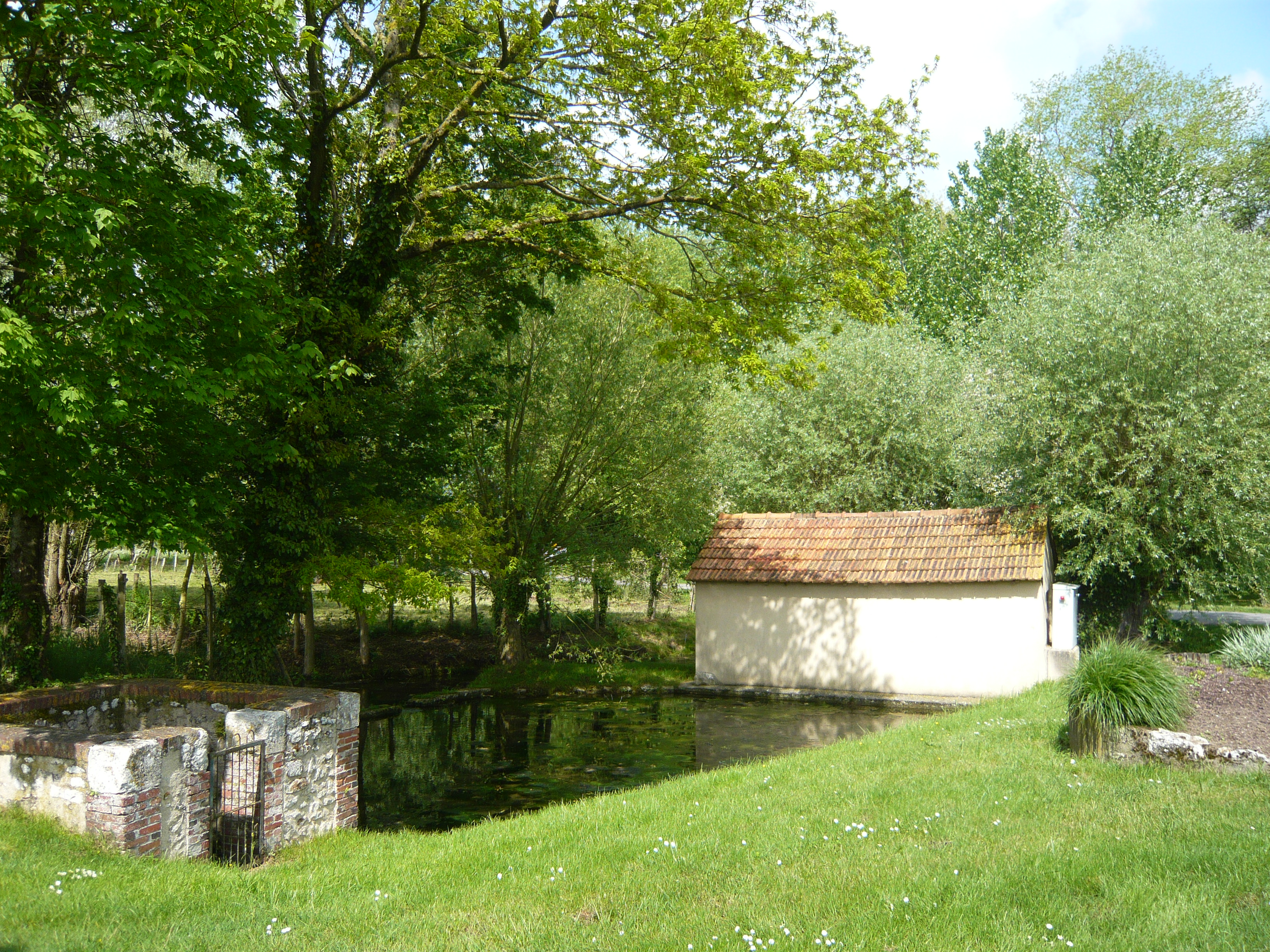
- The wash house in Ver-lès-Chartres
- Location of Ver-lès-Chartres
- Location within France Location within Centre-Val de Loire
- Coordinates: 48°23′10″N 1°28′45″E
- Country: France
- Region: Centre-Val de Loire
- Department: Eure-et-Loir
- Arrondissement: Chartres
- Canton: Chartres-2
- Intercommunality: CA Chartres Métropole

Government
  - Mayor (2020–2026): Max Van Der Stichele
- Area^{1}: 9.46 km^{2} (3.65 sq mi)
- Elevation: 135 m (443 ft)
- Highest elevation: 161 m (528 ft)
- Lowest elevation: 128 m (420 ft)
- Population (2023): 776
  - Density: 82.0/km^{2} (212/sq mi)
- Time zone: UTC+01:00 (CET)
  - Summer (DST): UTC+02:00 (CEST)
- INSEE/Postal code: 28403 /28630
- ^{1} French Land Register data, which excludes lakes, ponds, glaciers > 1 km^{2} (0.386 sq mi or 247 acres) and river estuaries.

Ver-lès-Chartres (French pronunciation: [vɛʁ lɛ ʃaʁtʁ], literally Ver near Chartres) is a commune in the Eure-et-Loir department in northern France.

== Population ==
Historical population
Year	Pop.	±% p.a.
1968	330	—
1975	560	+7.85%
1982	708	+3.41%
1990	748	+0.69%
1999	724	−0.36%
2007	770	+0.77%
2012	831	+1.54%
2017	783	−1.18%
2023	776	−0.15%
Source: INSEE

== See also ==
- Communes of the Eure-et-Loir department
