= Berchères-les-Pierres =

- Commune
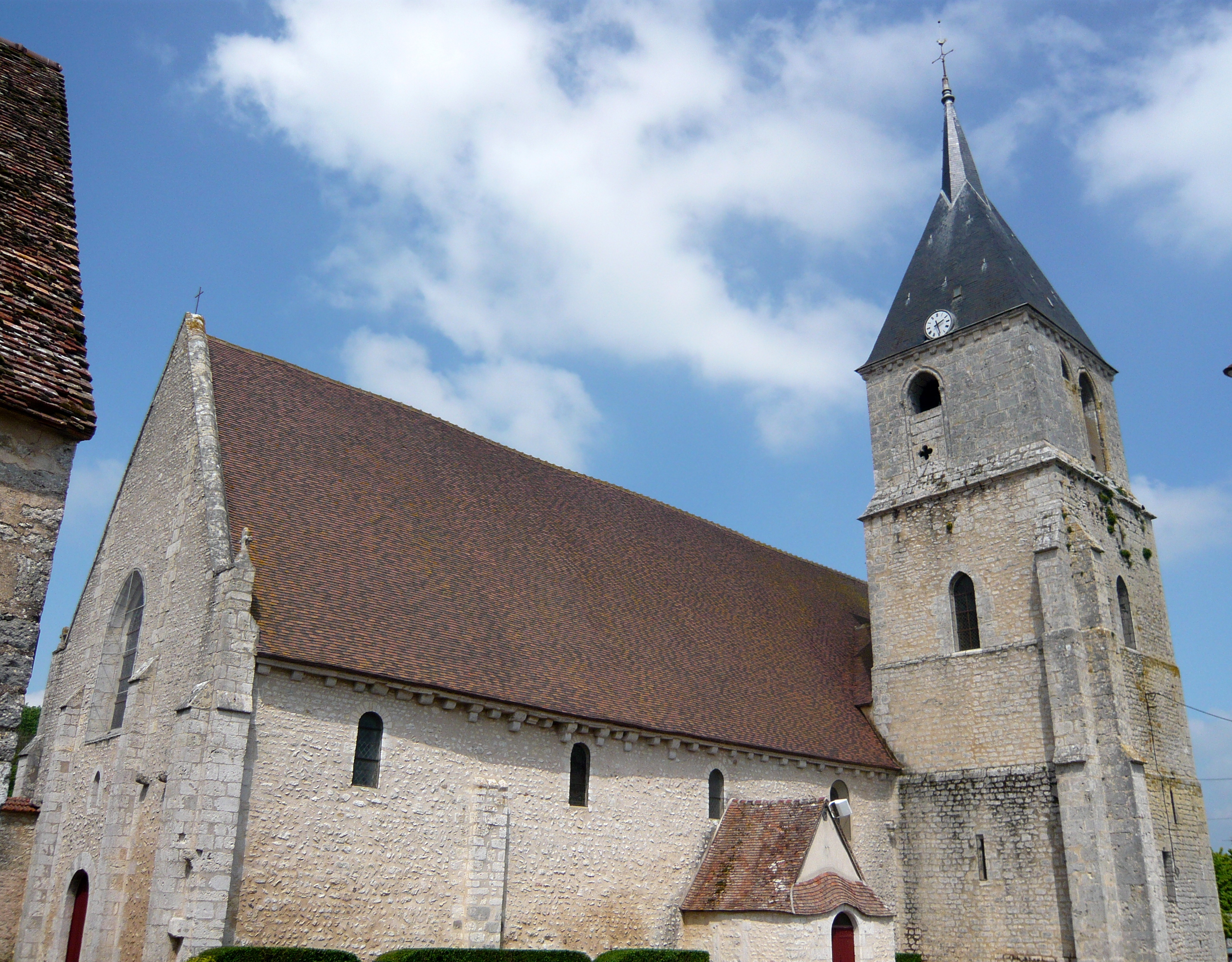
- The church in Berchères-les-Pierres
- Location of Berchères-les-Pierres
- Location within France Location within Centre-Val de Loire
- Coordinates: 48°23′09″N 1°33′15″E
- Country: France
- Region: Centre-Val de Loire
- Department: Eure-et-Loir
- Arrondissement: Chartres
- Canton: Chartres-2
- Intercommunality: CA Chartres Métropole

Government
  - Mayor (2020–2026): Jean-Claude Breton
- Area^{1}: 19.83 km^{2} (7.66 sq mi)
- Elevation: 146 m (479 ft)
- Highest elevation: 156 m (512 ft)
- Lowest elevation: 136 m (446 ft)
- Population (2023): 1,000
  - Density: 50/km^{2} (130/sq mi)
- Time zone: UTC+01:00 (CET)
  - Summer (DST): UTC+02:00 (CEST)
- INSEE/Postal code: 28035 /28630
- ^{1} French Land Register data, which excludes lakes, ponds, glaciers > 1 km^{2} (0.386 sq mi or 247 acres) and river estuaries.

Berchères-les-Pierres (French pronunciation: [bɛʁʃɛʁ lɛ pjɛʁ]) is a commune in the Eure-et-Loir department in north-central France.

== Population ==
Historical population
Year	Pop.	±% p.a.
1968	670	—
1975	728	+1.19%
1982	711	−0.34%
1990	882	+2.73%
1999	916	+0.42%
2007	946	+0.40%
2012	985	+0.81%
2017	1,000	+0.30%
2023	1,000	+0.00%
Source: INSEE

== See also ==
- Communes of the Eure-et-Loir department
