= Amilly, Eure-et-Loir =

Amilly
- Commune
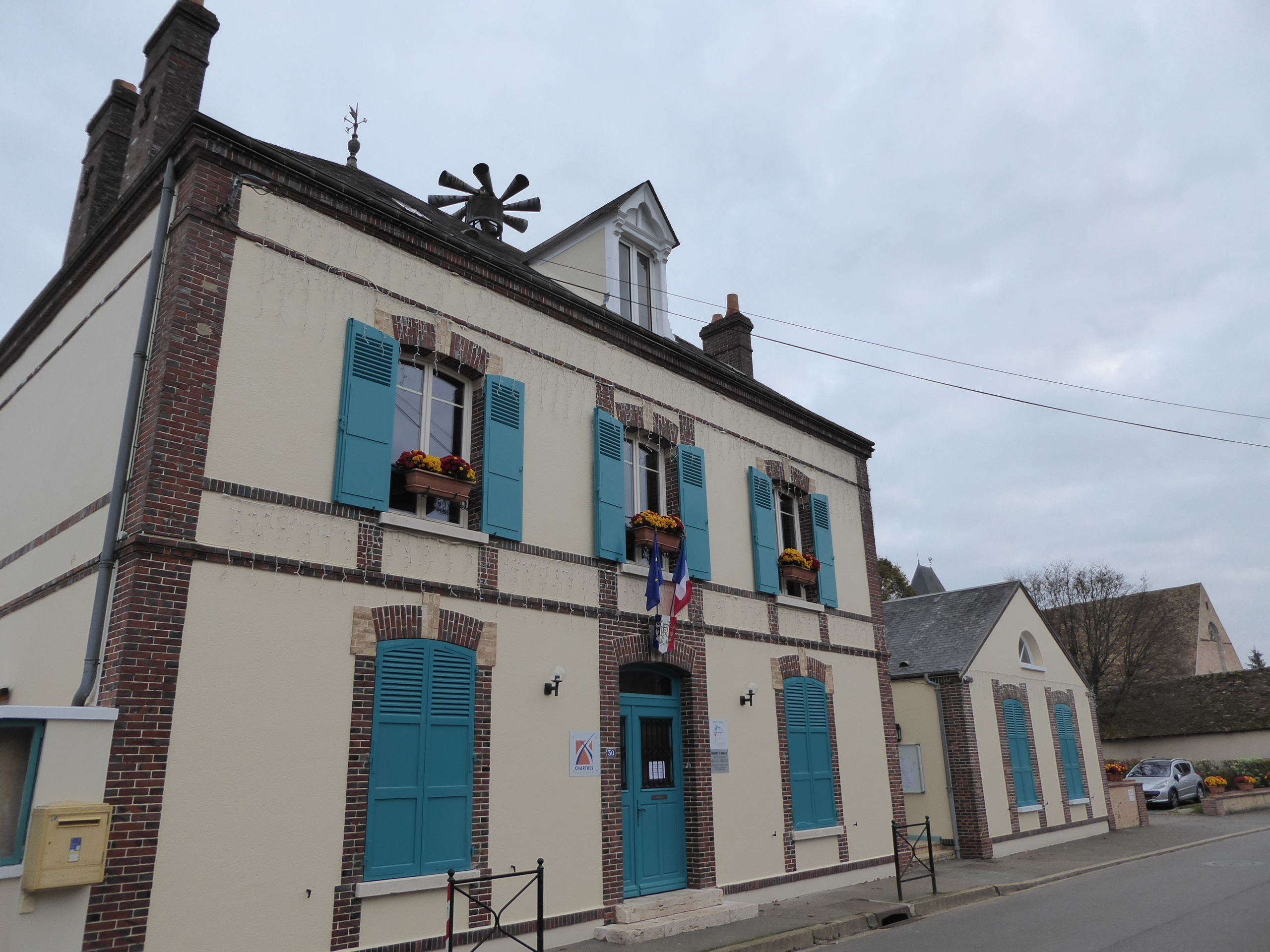
- The town hall in Amilly
- Location of Amilly
- Location within France Location within Centre-Val de Loire
- Coordinates: 48°26′34″N 1°23′35″E
- Country: France
- Region: Centre-Val de Loire
- Department: Eure-et-Loir
- Arrondissement: Chartres
- Canton: Lucé
- Intercommunality: Chartres Métropole

Government
  - Mayor (2020–2026): Denis-Marc Sirot-Foreau
- Area^{1}: 20.01 km^{2} (7.73 sq mi)
- Highest elevation: 169 m (554 ft)
- Lowest elevation: 149 m (489 ft)
- Population (2023): 1,855
  - Density: 92.70/km^{2} (240.1/sq mi)
- Time zone: UTC+01:00 (CET)
  - Summer (DST): UTC+02:00 (CEST)
- INSEE/Postal code: 28006 /28300
- ^{1} French Land Register data, which excludes lakes, ponds, glaciers > 1 km^{2} (0.386 sq mi or 247 acres) and river estuaries.

Amilly (French pronunciation: [amiji]) is a commune in the Eure-et-Loir department in northern France.

== Population ==
Historical population
Year	Pop.	±% p.a.
1968	676	—
1975	1,168	+8.13%
1982	1,779	+6.20%
1990	2,098	+2.08%
1999	1,958	−0.76%
2007	1,898	−0.39%
2012	1,870	−0.30%
2017	1,842	−0.30%
2023	1,855	+0.12%
Source: INSEE

== See also ==
- Communes of the Eure-et-Loir department
