= Le Coudray =

- Commune
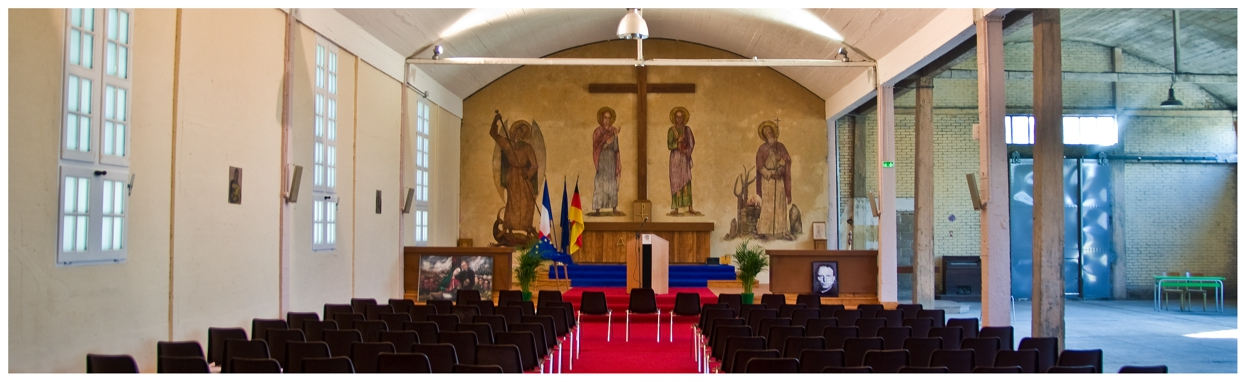
- Chapel of the seminary
- Location of Le Coudray
- Location within France Location within Centre-Val de Loire
- Coordinates: 48°25′18″N 1°29′51″E
- Country: France
- Region: Centre-Val de Loire
- Department: Eure-et-Loir
- Arrondissement: Chartres
- Canton: Chartres-2
- Intercommunality: CA Chartres Métropole

Government
  - Mayor (2020–2026): Dominique Soulet
- Area^{1}: 5.52 km^{2} (2.13 sq mi)
- Elevation: 147 m (482 ft)
- Highest elevation: 153 m (502 ft)
- Lowest elevation: 125 m (410 ft)
- Population (2023): 4,038
  - Density: 732/km^{2} (1,890/sq mi)
- Time zone: UTC+01:00 (CET)
  - Summer (DST): UTC+02:00 (CEST)
- INSEE/Postal code: 28110 /28630
- ^{1} French Land Register data, which excludes lakes, ponds, glaciers > 1 km^{2} (0.386 sq mi or 247 acres) and river estuaries.

Le Coudray (French pronunciation: [lə kudʁɛ]) is a commune in the Eure-et-Loir department in northern France.

== Population ==
Historical population
Year	Pop.	±% p.a.
1968	931	—
1975	1,251	+4.31%
1982	1,441	+2.04%
1990	2,022	+4.33%
1999	2,884	+4.02%
2007	3,753	+3.35%
2012	4,166	+2.11%
2017	4,161	−0.02%
2023	4,038	−0.50%
Source: INSEE

== See also ==
- Communes of the Eure-et-Loir department
