= Nogent-le-Phaye =

- Commune
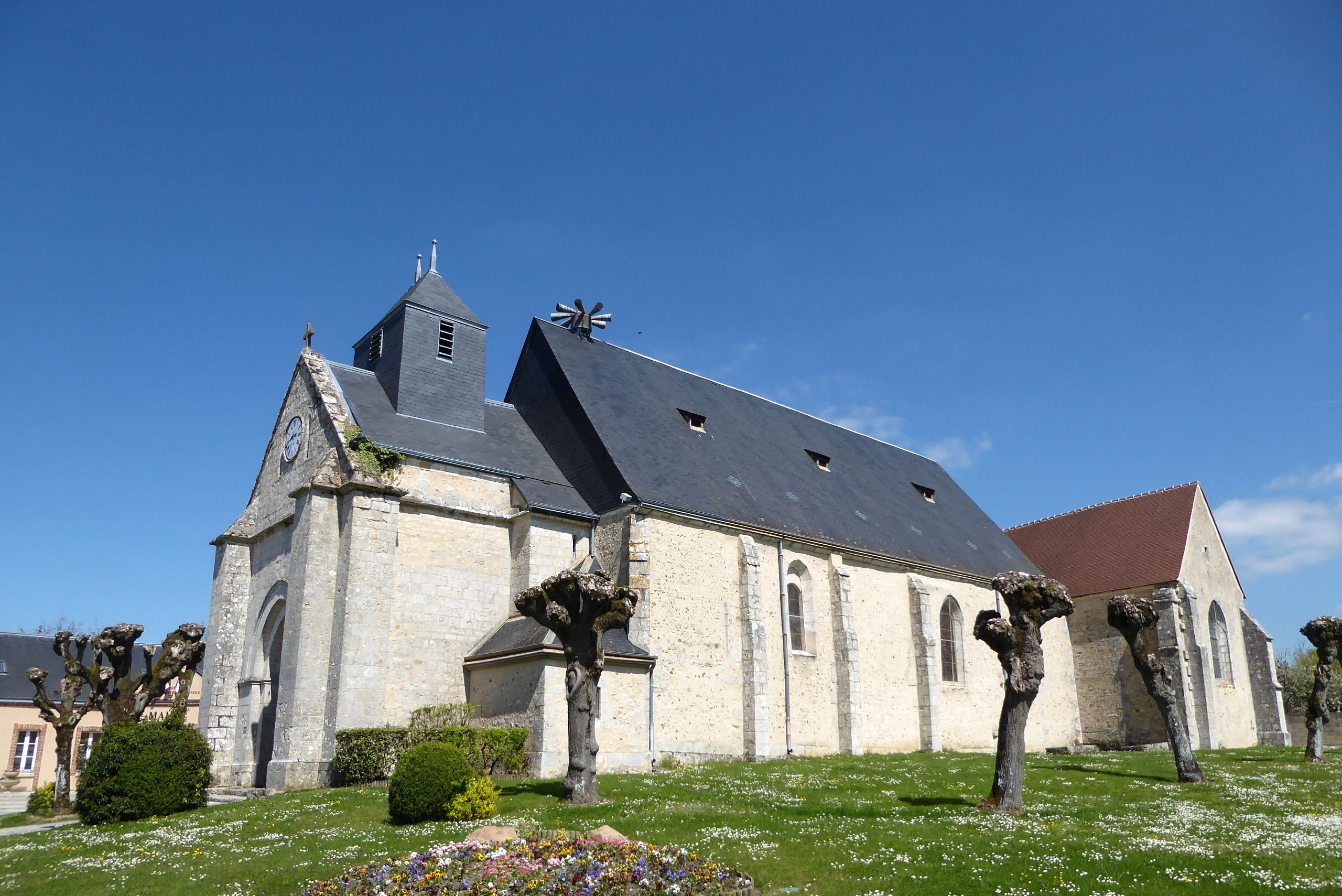
- The church in Nogent-le-Phaye
- Location of Nogent-le-Phaye
- Location within France Location within Centre-Val de Loire
- Coordinates: 48°26′52″N 1°34′39″E
- Country: France
- Region: Centre-Val de Loire
- Department: Eure-et-Loir
- Arrondissement: Chartres
- Canton: Chartres-2
- Intercommunality: CA Chartres Métropole

Government
  - Mayor (2020–2026): Benjamin Beyssac
- Area^{1}: 15.01 km^{2} (5.80 sq mi)
- Elevation: 143 m (469 ft)
- Highest elevation: 151 m (495 ft)
- Lowest elevation: 127 m (417 ft)
- Population (2023): 1,452
  - Density: 96.74/km^{2} (250.5/sq mi)
- Time zone: UTC+01:00 (CET)
  - Summer (DST): UTC+02:00 (CEST)
- INSEE/Postal code: 28278 /28630
- ^{1} French Land Register data, which excludes lakes, ponds, glaciers > 1 km^{2} (0.386 sq mi or 247 acres) and river estuaries.

Nogent-le-Phaye (French pronunciation: [nɔʒɑ̃ lə fɛ]) is a commune in the Eure-et-Loir department in northern France.

== Population ==
Historical population
Year	Pop.	±% p.a.
1968	577	—
1975	833	+5.39%
1982	879	+0.77%
1990	1,004	+1.68%
1999	1,196	+1.96%
2007	1,296	+1.01%
2012	1,348	+0.79%
2017	1,472	+1.78%
2023	1,452	−0.23%
Source: INSEE

== See also ==
- Communes of the Eure-et-Loir department
