= Saint-Aubin-des-Bois, Eure-et-Loir =

Saint-Aubin-des-Bois
- Commune
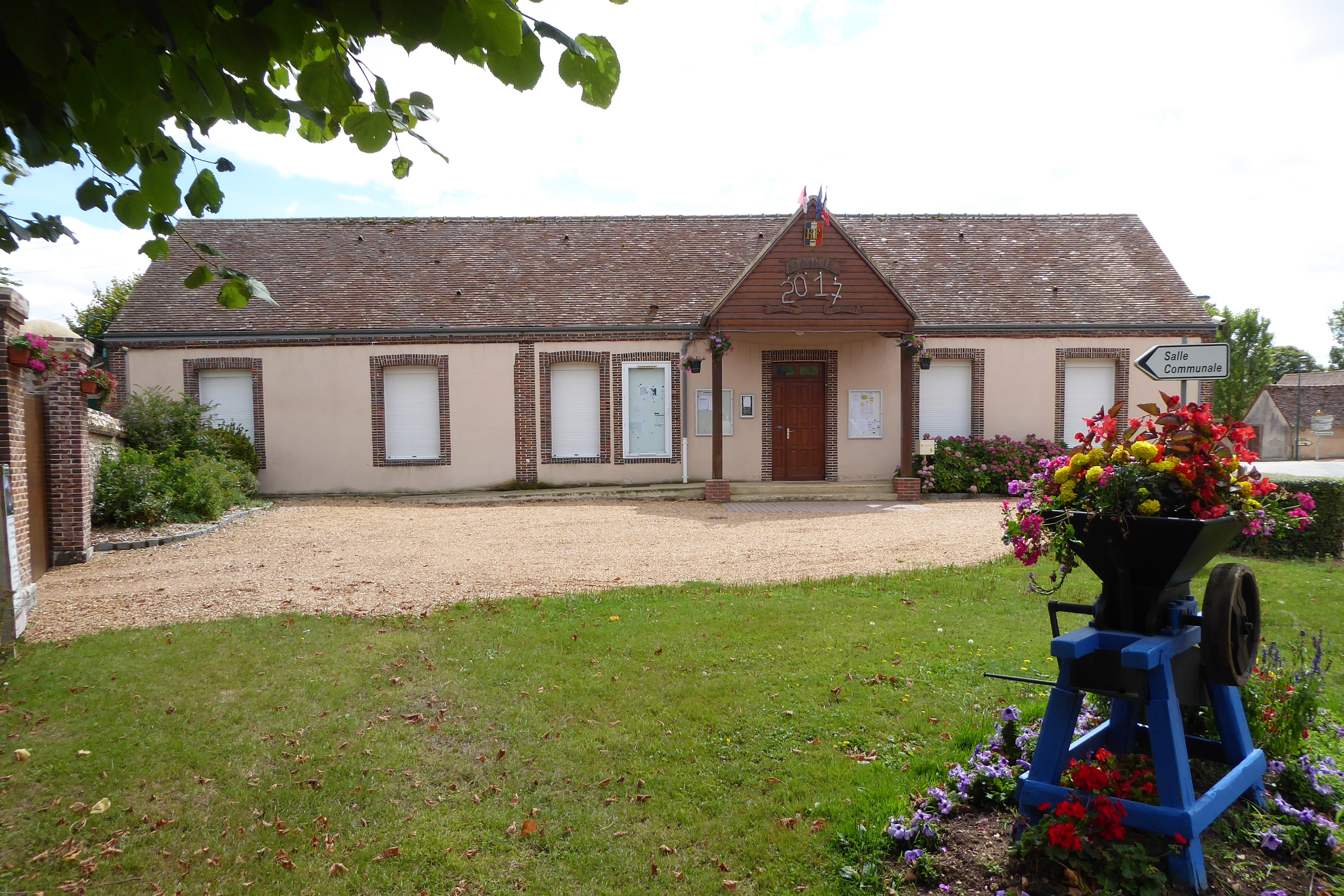
- The town hall in Saint-Aubin-des-Bois

- Coat of arms
- Location of Saint-Aubin-des-Bois
- Location within France Location within Centre-Val de Loire
- Coordinates: 48°28′08″N 1°21′48″E
- Country: France
- Region: Centre-Val de Loire
- Department: Eure-et-Loir
- Arrondissement: Chartres
- Canton: Chartres-3
- Intercommunality: CA Chartres Métropole

Government
  - Mayor (2020–2026): Guy Maurenard
- Area^{1}: 18.09 km^{2} (6.98 sq mi)
- Elevation: 170 m (560 ft)
- Highest elevation: 242 m (794 ft)
- Lowest elevation: 154 m (505 ft)
- Population (2023): 1,159
  - Density: 64.07/km^{2} (165.9/sq mi)
- Time zone: UTC+01:00 (CET)
  - Summer (DST): UTC+02:00 (CEST)
- INSEE/Postal code: 28325 /28300
- ^{1} French Land Register data, which excludes lakes, ponds, glaciers > 1 km^{2} (0.386 sq mi or 247 acres) and river estuaries.

Saint-Aubin-des-Bois (French pronunciation: [sɛ̃.t‿obɛ̃ de bwa]) is a commune in the Eure-et-Loir department in northern France.

== Population ==
Historical population
Year	Pop.	±% p.a.
1968	313	—
1975	424	+4.43%
1982	614	+5.43%
1990	868	+4.42%
1999	987	+1.44%
2007	949	−0.49%
2012	957	+0.17%
2017	1,016	+1.20%
2023	1,159	+2.22%
Source: INSEE

== See also ==
- Communes of the Eure-et-Loir department
