= Communauté d'agglomération Chartres Métropole =

Chartres Métropole
- Communauté d'agglomération
- Interactive map of Chartres Métropole
- Country: France
- Region: Centre-Val de Loire
- Department: Eure-et-Loir
- No. of communes: {{{nbcomm}}}
- Established: 2013
- Area: 858.3 km^{2} (331.4 sq mi)
- Population (2017): 136,218
  - Density: 158.7/km^{2} (411.0/sq mi)
- Website: www.chartres-metropole.fr

Communauté d'agglomération Chartres Métropole is an intercommunal structure, centred on the city of Chartres. It is located in the Eure-et-Loir department, in the Centre-Val de Loire region, northern France. It was created in January 2013. Its seat is in Chartres. Its area is 858.3 km^{2}. Its population was 136,218 in 2017, of which 38,578 in Chartres proper.

== Composition ==
The communauté d'agglomération consists of the following 66 communes:

1. Allonnes
2. Amilly
3. Bailleau-l'Évêque
4. Barjouville
5. Berchères-les-Pierres
6. Berchères-Saint-Germain
7. Boisville-la-Saint-Père
8. Boncé
9. Bouglainval
10. La Bourdinière-Saint-Loup
11. Briconville
12. Challet
13. Champhol
14. Champseru
15. Chartainvilliers
16. Chartres
17. Chauffours
18. Cintray
19. Clévilliers
20. Coltainville
21. Corancez
22. Le Coudray
23. Dammarie
24. Dangers
25. Denonville
26. Ermenonville-la-Grande
27. Fontenay-sur-Eure
28. Francourville
29. Fresnay-le-Comte
30. Fresnay-le-Gilmert
31. Gasville-Oisème
32. Gellainville
33. Houville-la-Branche
34. Houx
35. Jouy
36. Lèves
37. Lucé
38. Luisant
39. Maintenon
40. Mainvilliers
41. Meslay-le-Grenet
42. Meslay-le-Vidame
43. Mignières
44. Mittainvilliers-Vérigny
45. Moinville-la-Jeulin
46. Morancez
47. Nogent-le-Phaye
48. Nogent-sur-Eure
49. Oinville-sous-Auneau
50. Ollé
51. Poisvilliers
52. Prunay-le-Gillon
53. Roinville
54. Saint-Aubin-des-Bois
55. Saint-Georges-sur-Eure
56. Saint-Léger-des-Aubées
57. Saint-Prest
58. Sandarville
59. Santeuil
60. Sours
61. Theuville
62. Thivars
63. Umpeau
64. Ver-lès-Chartres
65. Vitray-en-Beauce
66. Voise
