= Gellainville =

- Commune
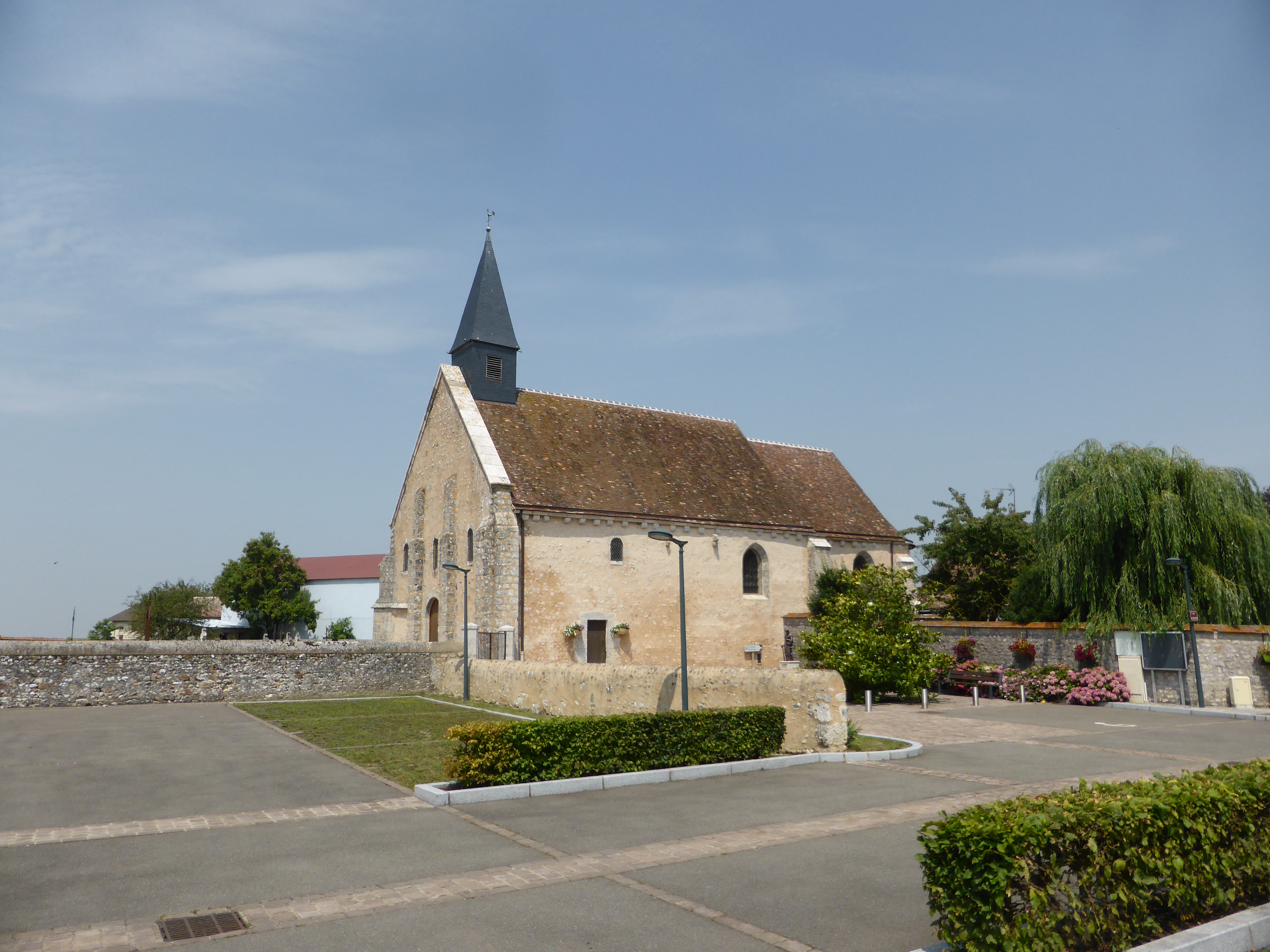
- The church in Gellainville

- Coat of arms
- Location of Gellainville
- Location within France Location within Centre-Val de Loire
- Coordinates: 48°24′32″N 1°31′48″E
- Country: France
- Region: Centre-Val de Loire
- Department: Eure-et-Loir
- Arrondissement: Chartres
- Canton: Chartres-2
- Intercommunality: CA Chartres Métropole

Government
  - Mayor (2020–2026): Christophe Leroy
- Area^{1}: 12.01 km^{2} (4.64 sq mi)
- Elevation: 148 m (486 ft)
- Highest elevation: 156 m (512 ft)
- Lowest elevation: 137 m (449 ft)
- Population (2023): 765
  - Density: 63.7/km^{2} (165/sq mi)
- Time zone: UTC+01:00 (CET)
  - Summer (DST): UTC+02:00 (CEST)
- INSEE/Postal code: 28177 /28630
- ^{1} French Land Register data, which excludes lakes, ponds, glaciers > 1 km^{2} (0.386 sq mi or 247 acres) and river estuaries.

Gellainville (French pronunciation: [ʒɛlɛ̃vil]) is a commune in the Eure-et-Loir department in northern France.

== Population ==
Historical population
Year	Pop.	±% p.a.
1968	273	—
1975	291	+0.92%
1982	364	+3.25%
1990	413	+1.59%
1999	409	−0.11%
2007	480	+2.02%
2012	613	+5.01%
2017	670	+1.79%
2023	765	+2.23%
Source: INSEE

== See also ==
- Communes of the Eure-et-Loir department
