= Sours =

- Commune
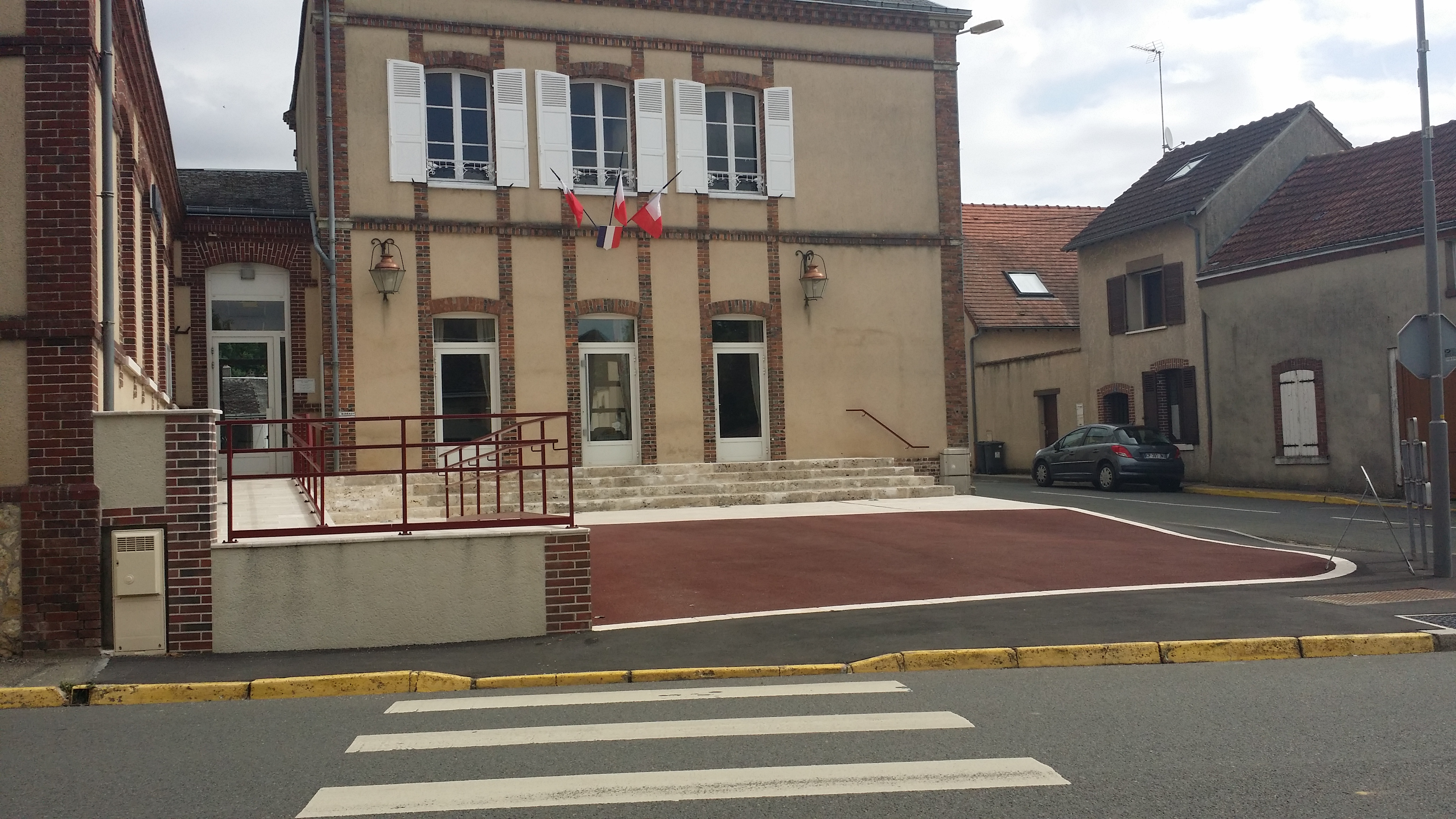
- The town hall in Sours
- Location of Sours
- Location within France Location within Centre-Val de Loire
- Coordinates: 48°24′38″N 1°35′53″E
- Country: France
- Region: Centre-Val de Loire
- Department: Eure-et-Loir
- Arrondissement: Chartres
- Canton: Chartres-2
- Intercommunality: CA Chartres Métropole

Government
  - Mayor (2020–2026): Jean-Michel Plault
- Area^{1}: 33.15 km^{2} (12.80 sq mi)
- Elevation: 150 m (490 ft)
- Highest elevation: 158 m (518 ft)
- Lowest elevation: 136 m (446 ft)
- Population (2023): 1,959
  - Density: 59.10/km^{2} (153.1/sq mi)
- Time zone: UTC+01:00 (CET)
  - Summer (DST): UTC+02:00 (CEST)
- INSEE/Postal code: 28380 /28630
- ^{1} French Land Register data, which excludes lakes, ponds, glaciers > 1 km^{2} (0.386 sq mi or 247 acres) and river estuaries.

Sours (French pronunciation: [suʁ]) is a commune in the Eure-et-Loir department in northern France.

== Population ==
Historical population
Year	Pop.	±% p.a.
1968	1,108	—
1975	1,239	+1.61%
1982	1,262	+0.26%
1990	1,513	+2.29%
1999	1,666	+1.08%
2007	1,767	+0.74%
2012	1,859	+1.02%
2017	1,951	+0.97%
2023	1,959	+0.07%
Source: INSEE

== See also ==
- Communes of the Eure-et-Loir department
