= Mainvilliers, Eure-et-Loir =

Mainvilliers
- Commune
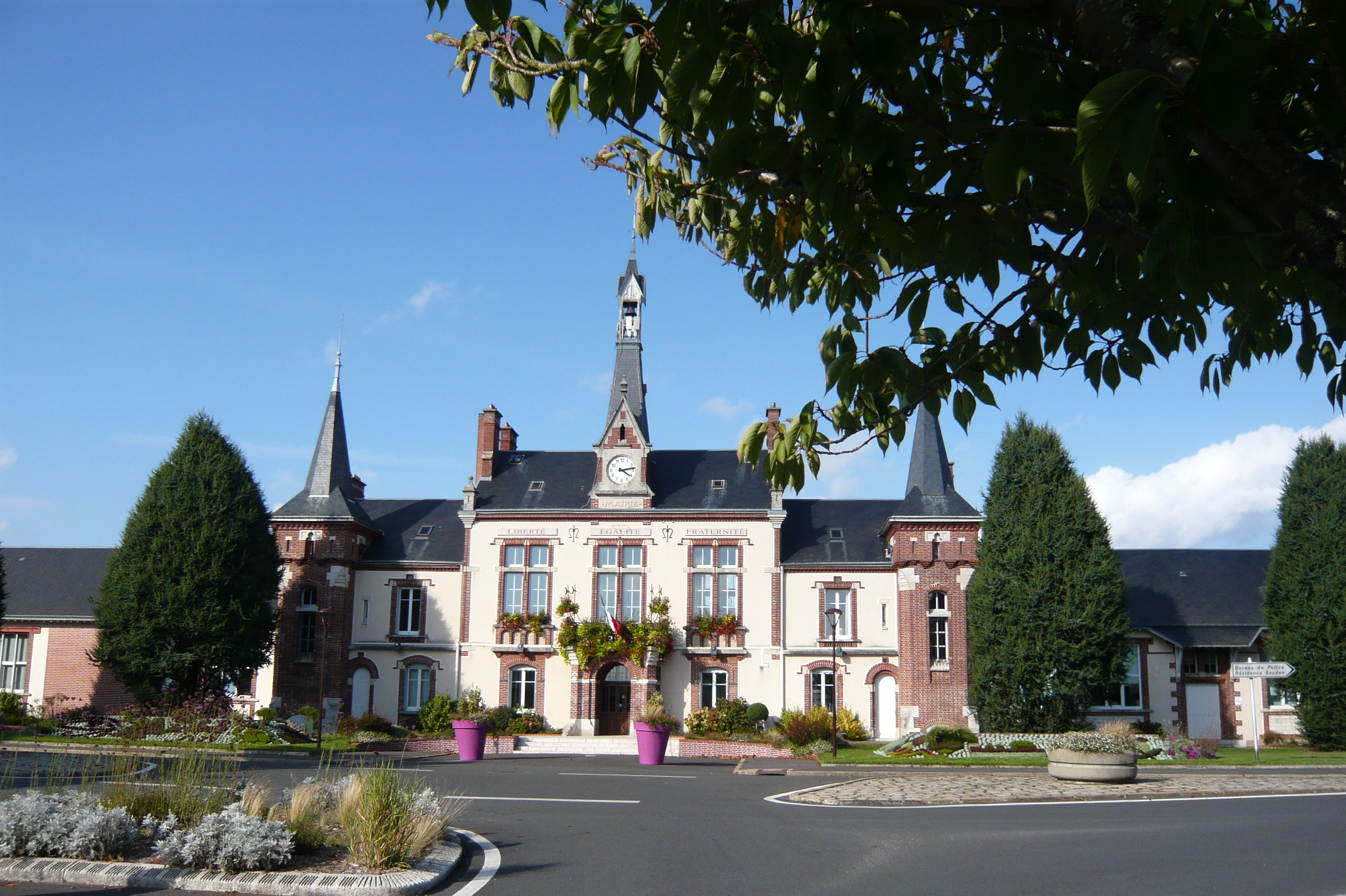
- The town hall, 1902.

- Coat of arms
- Location of Mainvilliers
- Location within France Location within Centre-Val de Loire
- Coordinates: 48°27′14″N 1°27′46″E
- Country: France
- Region: Centre-Val de Loire
- Department: Eure-et-Loir
- Arrondissement: Chartres
- Canton: Chartres-3
- Intercommunality: CA Chartres Métropole

Government
  - Mayor (2022–2026): Michèle Bonthoux
- Area^{1}: 11.92 km^{2} (4.60 sq mi)
- Elevation: 125 m (410 ft)
- Highest elevation: 165 m (541 ft)
- Lowest elevation: 133 m (436 ft)
- Population (2023): 10,629
  - Density: 891.7/km^{2} (2,309/sq mi)
- Time zone: UTC+01:00 (CET)
  - Summer (DST): UTC+02:00 (CEST)
- INSEE/Postal code: 28229 /28300
- ^{1} French Land Register data, which excludes lakes, ponds, glaciers > 1 km^{2} (0.386 sq mi or 247 acres) and river estuaries.

Mainvilliers (French pronunciation: [mɛ̃vilje]) is a commune in the Eure-et-Loir department in northern France. The sixth largest city in the department by population, its inhabitants are called Mainvillois and Mainvilloises.

== Population ==
Historical population

Year	Pop.	±% p.a.
1793	750	—
1800	918	+2.93%
1806	908	−0.18%
1821	1,032	+0.86%
1831	1,046	+0.13%
1836	720	−7.20%
1841	706	−0.39%
1846	736	+0.84%
1851	819	+2.16%
1856	839	+0.48%
1861	883	+1.03%
1866	974	+1.98%
1872	1,100	+2.05%
1876	1,118	+0.41%
1881	1,230	+1.93%
1886	1,251	+0.34%
1891	1,372	+1.86%
1896	1,491	+1.68%
1901	1,605	+1.48%

Year	Pop.	±% p.a.
1906	1,556	−0.62%
1911	1,725	+2.08%
1921	1,653	−0.43%
1926	1,690	+0.44%
1931	2,033	+3.76%
1936	2,178	+1.39%
1946	2,422	+1.07%
1954	2,580	+0.79%
1962	4,068	+5.86%
1968	6,119	+7.04%
1975	8,499	+4.81%
1982	10,068	+2.45%
1990	9,956	−0.14%
1999	10,018	+0.07%
2007	10,287	+0.33%
2012	10,256	−0.06%
2017	11,182	+1.74%
2023	10,629	−0.84%

Source: EHESS and INSEE

== See also ==
- Communes of the Eure-et-Loir department
