= Courville-sur-Eure =

- Commune
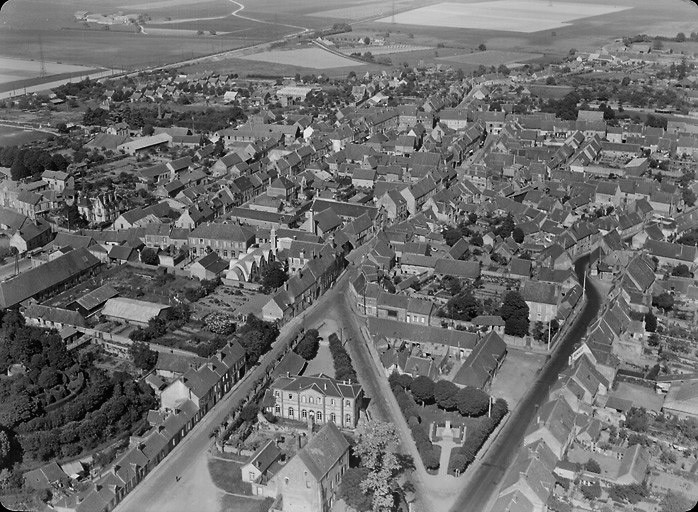
- An aerial view of Courville-sur-Eure

- Coat of arms
- Location of Courville-sur-Eure
- Location within France Location within Centre-Val de Loire
- Coordinates: 48°27′03″N 1°14′28″E
- Country: France
- Region: Centre-Val de Loire
- Department: Eure-et-Loir
- Arrondissement: Chartres
- Canton: Illiers-Combray
- Intercommunality: Entre Beauce et Perche

Government
  - Mayor (2020–2026): Hervé Buisson
- Area^{1}: 11.13 km^{2} (4.30 sq mi)
- Highest elevation: 194 m (636 ft)
- Lowest elevation: 155 m (509 ft)
- Population (2023): 2,791
  - Density: 250.8/km^{2} (649.5/sq mi)
- Time zone: UTC+01:00 (CET)
  - Summer (DST): UTC+02:00 (CEST)
- INSEE/Postal code: 28116 /28190
- ^{1} French Land Register data, which excludes lakes, ponds, glaciers > 1 km^{2} (0.386 sq mi or 247 acres) and river estuaries.

Courville-sur-Eure (French pronunciation: [kuʁvil syʁ œʁ]) is a commune in the Eure-et-Loir department in France.

== Population ==
Historical population
Year	Pop.	±% p.a.
1968	1,972	—
1975	2,030	+0.41%
1982	2,260	+1.55%
1990	2,375	+0.62%
1999	2,739	+1.60%
2007	2,737	−0.01%
2012	2,827	+0.65%
2017	2,867	+0.28%
2023	2,791	−0.45%
Source: INSEE

== See also ==
- Communes of the Eure-et-Loir department
