= Boncé =

- Commune
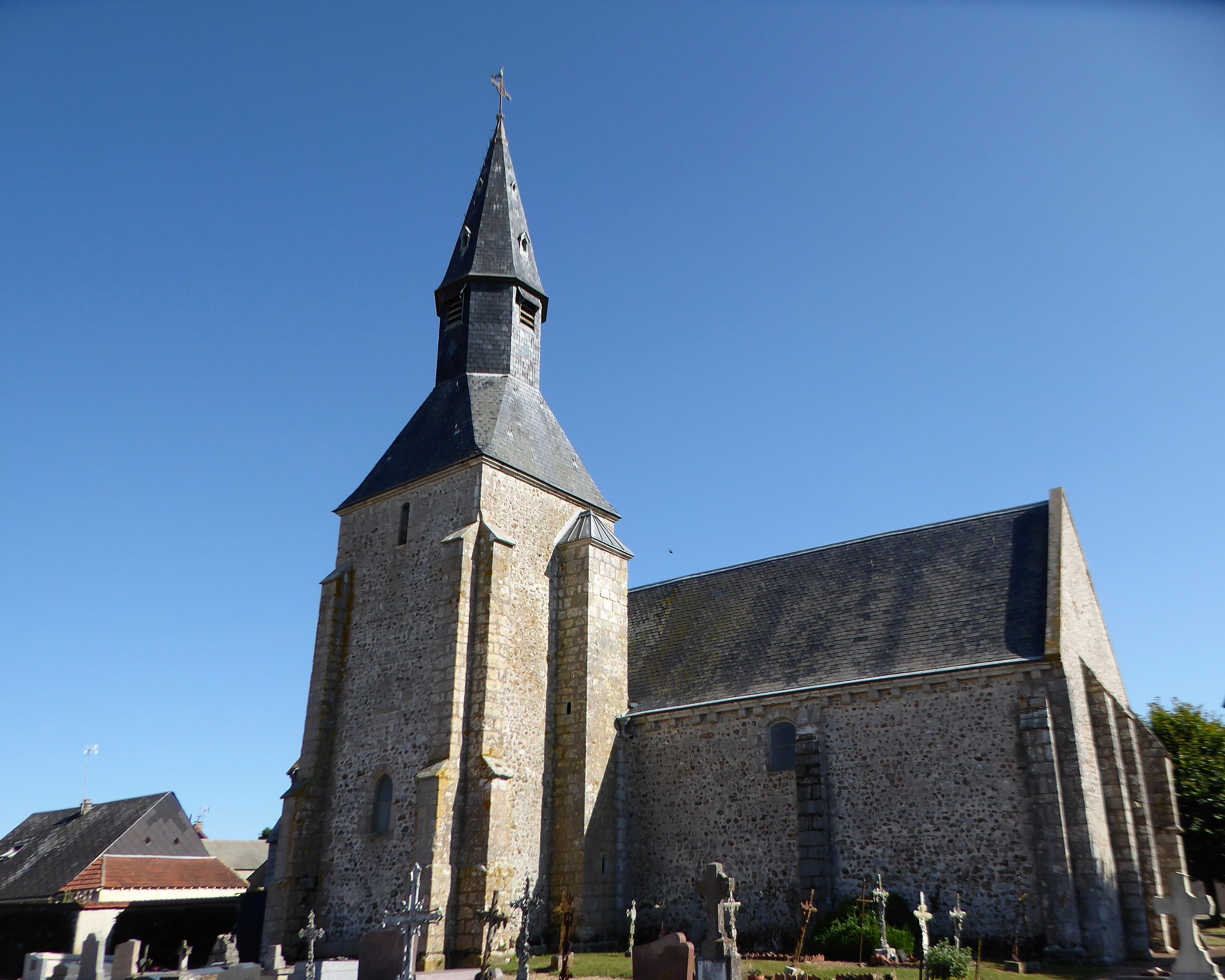
- The church in Boncé
- Location of Boncé
- Location within France Location within Centre-Val de Loire
- Coordinates: 48°18′30″N 1°30′17″E
- Country: France
- Region: Centre-Val de Loire
- Department: Eure-et-Loir
- Arrondissement: Chartres
- Canton: Les Villages Vovéens
- Intercommunality: CA Chartres Métropole

Government
  - Mayor (2020–2026): Hervé Hardouin
- Area^{1}: 8.76 km^{2} (3.38 sq mi)
- Elevation: 150 m (490 ft)
- Highest elevation: 162 m (531 ft)
- Lowest elevation: 144 m (472 ft)
- Population (2023): 212
  - Density: 24.2/km^{2} (62.7/sq mi)
- Time zone: UTC+01:00 (CET)
  - Summer (DST): UTC+02:00 (CEST)
- INSEE/Postal code: 28049 /28150
- ^{1} French Land Register data, which excludes lakes, ponds, glaciers > 1 km^{2} (0.386 sq mi or 247 acres) and river estuaries.

Boncé (French pronunciation: [bɔ̃se]) is a commune in the Eure-et-Loir department and Centre-Val de Loire region of north-central France. It lies 15 km south of Chartres and some 85 km south-west of Paris.

== Population ==
Historical population
Year	Pop.	±% p.a.
1968	164	—
1975	157	−0.62%
1982	178	+1.81%
1990	197	+1.28%
1999	193	−0.23%
2007	227	+2.05%
2012	244	+1.45%
2017	245	+0.08%
2023	212	−2.38%
Source: INSEE

== See also ==
- Communes of the Eure-et-Loir department
