= Prunay-le-Gillon =

- Commune
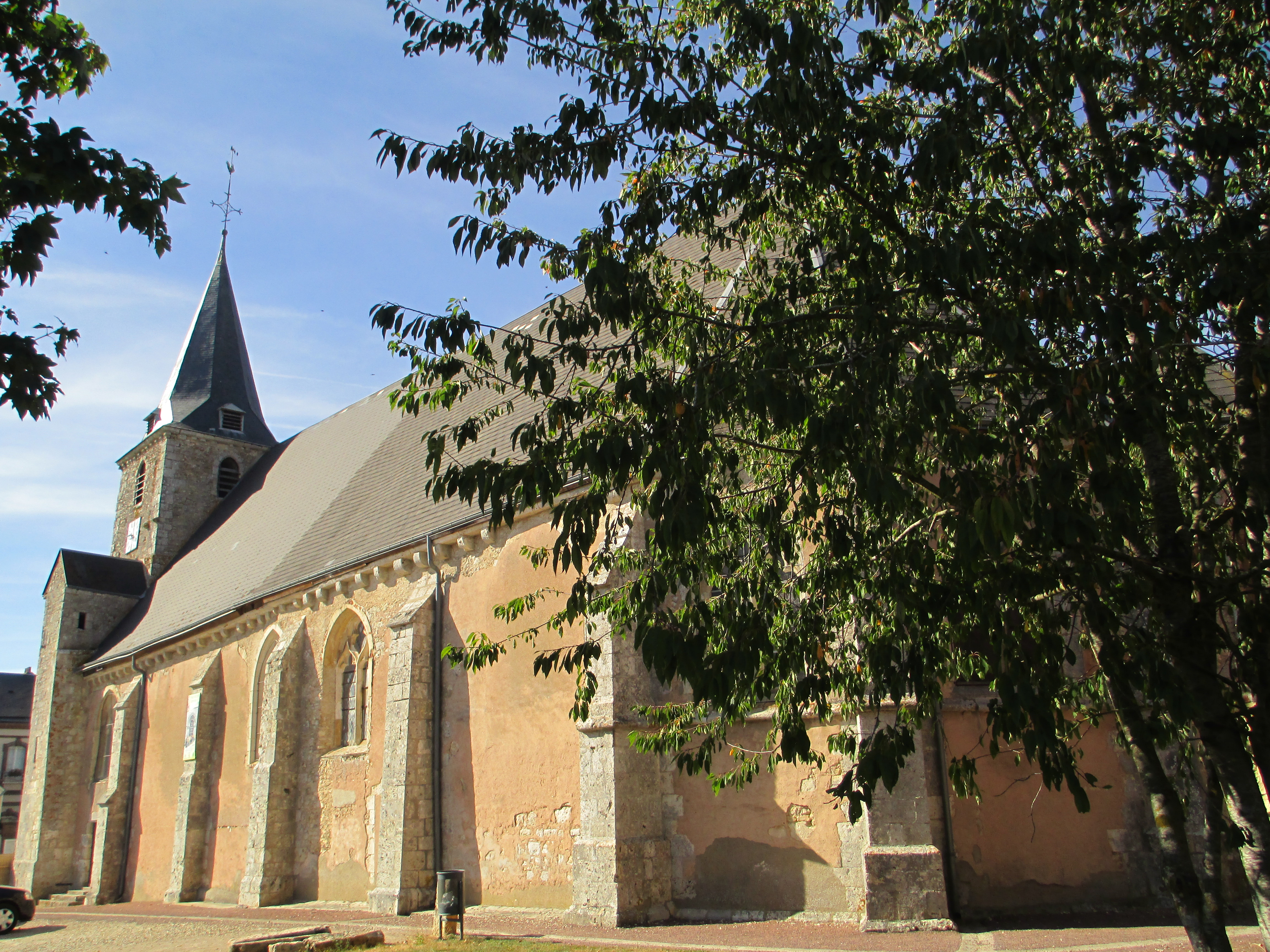
- The church in Prunay-le-Gillon

- Coat of arms
- Location of Prunay-le-Gillon
- Location within France Location within Centre-Val de Loire
- Coordinates: 48°21′58″N 1°38′10″E
- Country: France
- Region: Centre-Val de Loire
- Department: Eure-et-Loir
- Arrondissement: Chartres
- Canton: Chartres-2
- Intercommunality: CA Chartres Métropole

Government
  - Mayor (2020–2026): Nicolas Vanneau
- Area^{1}: 25.36 km^{2} (9.79 sq mi)
- Elevation: 156 m (512 ft)
- Highest elevation: 156 m (512 ft)
- Lowest elevation: 143 m (469 ft)
- Population (2023): 1,164
  - Density: 45.90/km^{2} (118.9/sq mi)
- Time zone: UTC+01:00 (CET)
  - Summer (DST): UTC+02:00 (CEST)
- INSEE/Postal code: 28309 /28360
- ^{1} French Land Register data, which excludes lakes, ponds, glaciers > 1 km^{2} (0.386 sq mi or 247 acres) and river estuaries.

Prunay-le-Gillon (French pronunciation: [pʁynɛ lə ʒilɔ̃]) is a commune in the Eure-et-Loir department in northern France.

== Population ==
Historical population
Year	Pop.	±% p.a.
1968	681	—
1975	727	+0.94%
1982	812	+1.59%
1990	941	+1.86%
1999	892	−0.59%
2007	920	+0.39%
2012	1,019	+2.07%
2017	1,075	+1.08%
2023	1,164	+1.33%
Source: INSEE

== See also ==
- Communes of the Eure-et-Loir department
