= Canton of Chartres-2 =

French canton

Coordinates: 48.44°N 1.49°E

The canton of Chartres-2 is an administrative division of the Eure-et-Loir department, northern France. It was created at the French canton reorganisation which came into effect in March 2015. Its seat is in Chartres.

It consists of the following communes:

1. Berchères-les-Pierres
2. La Bourdinière-Saint-Loup
3. Chartres (partly)
4. Corancez
5. Le Coudray
6. Dammarie
7. Fresnay-le-Comte
8. Gellainville
9. Mignières
10. Morancez
11. Nogent-le-Phaye
12. Prunay-le-Gillon
13. Sours
14. Thivars
15. Ver-lès-Chartres
