= List of châteaux in Eure-et-Loir =

This article is a non-exhaustive list of the châteaux located in the French department of Eure-et-Loir in the Centre-Val de Loire region.

== List of châteaux ==
Name	Commune	Comments	Coordinates	Ownership	Image
Château d'Abondant	Abondant	17th century Registered as Monument historique	48°47′02″N 1°26′13″E	Private	
Château d'Allainville	Allainville	Old priory	48.722763°N 1.298848°E		
Château d'Alluyes	Alluyes	12-16th century Classified and registered (partially) as Monument historique		Property of association	
Château d'Alonville	Bailleau-l'Évêque				
Château d'Ancise	Douy				
Château d'Anet	Anet	16-19th century Classified as Monument historique		Private; Access : Yes	
Château d'Arnouville	Gommerville	17-19th century Registered as Monument historique		Private	
Château d'Aulnaie	Saint-Christophe				
Château d'Aunay (ancien)	Aunay-sous-Crécy				
Château de Barjouville	Barjouville	16th century Registered as Monument historique		Private	
Château de Baronville	Béville-le-Comte	19th century Registered as Monument historique		Private	
Château de Beaumont-les-Autels	Beaumont-les-Autels				
Château de Boigneville	Yermenonville				
Château de Bois-Méan	Arrou				
Château des Boulard	Mignières	Hamlet of Spoir			
Château de la Boulidière	Douy				
Château du Boullay-Thierry	Boullay-Thierry (Le)	17-18th century Registered (partially) as Monument historique		Private	
Château de Bouthonvilliers	Dangeau	17-18th century Registered (partially) as Monument historique		Private	
Château de Bouville	Cloyes-sur-le-Loir				
Château de la Brunetière	Arrou				
Château de Cambray	Germignonville	18th century Registered (partially) as Monument historique		Private; Access: Yes	
Château de Champ-Romain	Thiville	18th century Classified and registered (partially) as Monument historique		Private	
Château de Chantemesle	Logron	15-18th century Registered (partially) as Monument historique		Private	
Château de Charbonnières	Charbonnières	19th century		Private	
Château de Châteaudun	Châteaudun	Château fort 12-16th century Classified and registered as Monument historique		Centre des monuments nationaux Access : Yes	
Château de Châteauneuf	Châteauneuf-en-Thymerais	Middle Ages; Demolished in 16th century			
Château de la Choltière	Crucey-Villages				
Château de Comteville	Dreux				
Château de Courtalain	Courtalain	15-19th century Registered as Monument historique		Private firm	
Château de la Couture	Le Thieulin				
Château de Crécy	Crécy-Couvé	Madame de Pompadour 's château Demolished			
Château de Denonville	Denonville	18th century Registered (partially) as Monument historique		Private	
Château de Dreux	Dreux	14-19th century Classified as Monument historique		Property of association	
Château d'Esclimont	Saint-Symphorien-le-Château	Classified Site naturel since 1965		Private	
Château d'Escorpain	Escorpain	Ambroise Firmin-Didot's château 16-19th century Registered (partially) as Monument historique		Private	
Château de Fains-la-Folie	Fains-la-Folie				
Château de la Ferté-Vidame	La Ferté-Vidame	17-19th century Ruined; Classified and registered (partially) as Monument historique		Property of Eure-et-Loir department Access: Yes	
Château de Fontaine-la-Guyon	Fontaine-la-Guyon				
Château de Frazé	Frazé	15-18th century Classified as Monument historique		Private firm	
Château de la Fresnaye	La Puisaye				
Château de la Gadelière	Rueil-la-Gadelière	12-17th century Registered (partially) as Monument historique		Private; Access: Yes	
Château de la Galaisière	Souancé-au-Perche				
Château de Goury	Loigny-la-Bataille	17th century Classified and registered (partially) as Monument historique		Private	
Château du Grand Fresnay	Étilleux	15-16th century Registered (partially) as Monument historique		Private	
Château de Guainville	Guainville	12th century Classified and registered as Monument historique Archeological site			
Château du Hallier	La Ferté-Vidame				
Château de la Hallière	Digny	18th century Registered (partially) as Monument historique		Private	
Château de Herces	Berchères-sur-Vesgre	18th century Classified and registered as Monument historique		Private	
Château d'Houville-la-Branche	Houville-la-Branche	Anatole France's château 17-18th century Registered (partially) as Monument historique		Private	
Château d'Illiers-Combray	Illiers-Combray	16th century Registered (partially) as Monument historique		Private	
Château de Janville	Janville	Retirement home			
Château de Javersy	Coltainville				
Château du Jonchet	Romilly-sur-Aigre	16-18th century Classified (partially) as Monument historique		Private firm	
Château de Levainville	Levainville	Almost completely destroyed			
Château de Levesville	Bailleau-l'Évêque	15-17 century Registered (partially) as Monument historique		Private; Access : No	
Château de Lignerolles	Thieulin (Le)				
Château de La Loupe	La Loupe			Public	
Château de Louville	Louville-la-Chenard		48°19′24″N 1°47′20″E		
Château de Lumeau	Lumeau				
Château de Maillebois	Maillebois	15-19th century Registered (partially) as Monument historique		Private	
Château de Maintenon	Maintenon	12-18th century Classified as Monument historique		Departmental council of Eure-et-Loir; Access : Yes	
Château de Manou	Manou				
Château de Marcouville (Eure-et-Loir)	Vitray-sous-Brezolles				
Château de Marmousse	Garnay				
Château de Mémillon	Saint-Maur-sur-le-Loir	15-17th century remains Classified and registered (partially) as Monument historique		Private	
Château de Méréglise	Méréglise	18-19th century Registered (partially) as Monument historique		Private	
Château de Meslay-le-Vidame	Meslay-le-Vidame				
Château de Moléans	Moléans	16-19th century Classified and registered (partially) as Monument historique		Private firm	
Château de Montboissier	Montboissier	Partially ruined			
Château de Montdoucet	Souancé-au-Perche				
Château de Montigny-le-Gannelon	Montigny-le-Gannelon	19th century Registered as Monument historique		Private; Access: Yes	
Château de Montireau (vieux)	Montireau				
Château de Montireau; Dit la Cour d'Anthenaise	Montireau			Private	
Château de Morainville	Morainville				
Château de Moresville	Flacey				
Château de Mormoulins	Chaudon				
Château de Mottereau	Mottereau				
Château de Nogent-le-Roi	Nogent-le-Roi	15-19th century Registered (partially) as Monument historique		Property of Nogent-le-Roi; Access: Yes	
Château d'Oursières	Argenvilliers	17-18th Registered (partially) as Monument historique		Private	
Château d'Oysonville	Oysonville				
Château de Primard	Guainville				
Château du Puiset	Le Puiset	Ruins and museum "Espace des seigneurs du Puiset"; See also: Hugh I of Le Puiset			
Château de la Rémonière	Arrou				
Château de Reverseaux	Rouvray-Saint-Florentin	18th century Classified (partially) as Monument historique		Private	
Château de la Rivière	Pontgouin	17th century Registered (partially) as Monument historique	48°29'05.3"N 1°08'21.9"E	Private	
Château de la Robertière	Abondant	In the forest of Dreux, destroyed			
Château de la Ronce	Rouvres				
Château de Roussainville	Illiers-Combray				
Château de Saint-Éman	Saint-Éman				
Château de Saint-Lubin-des-Joncherets	Saint-Lubin-des-Joncherets	17th century Registered as Monument historique		Private	
Château Saint-Jean de Nogent-le-Rotrou	Nogent-le-Rotrou	Château fort 11-17th century Classified and registered as Monument historique Contains a museum		Property of Nogent-le-Rotrou; Access: Yes	
Château de la Saussaye	Sours	Destroyed			
Château de Senonches	Senonches	12-17th century Classified and registered (partially) as Monument historique Contains a museum		Property of Senonches; Access: Yes	
Château de Sorel	Sorel-Moussel	17th century Ruined; Classified as Monument historique			
Château de Sours	Sours	17-18th century Registered (partially) as Monument historique		Private	
Château de Tansonville	Illiers-Combray			Private	
Château de Tardais	Senonches				
Château de Touchebredier	Chapelle-du-Noyer (La)	18th century Registered (partially) as Monument historique		Private	
Château de Tresneau	Thimert-Gâtelles	Demolished			
Château de Vauventriers	Champhol	16-17th century Registered (partially) as Monument historique		Private	
Château des Vaux	Pontgouin				
Château de Ver	Ver-lès-Chartres				
Château de Vérigny	Vérigny	16-18th century Registered (partially) as Monument historique		Private	
Château de la Vignardière	Marolles-les-Buis				
Château de Villebon	Villebon	Château fort 15-17th century Maximilien de Béthune, Duke of Sully's château Classified and registered (partially) as Monument historique		Private; Access: Yes	
Château de Villemesle	Boisgasson	17-18th century Registered (partially) as Monument historique		Private firm	
Château de Villepion	Terminiers	15-17th century Registered (partially) as Monument historique		Private	
Château de Villeprévost	Tillay-le-Péneux	16-18th century Registered (partially) as Monument historique		Private	
Château de Vitray	Gilles				
Château de Vrainville	Montharville				
Manoir du Jaglu	Saint-Sauveur-Marville				
Motte médiévale du Plessis-Saint-Rémy	Saint-Rémy-sur-Avre	Middle Ages; Registered as Monument historique		Private	
Tour d'Auneau	Auneau	11-15th century Registered as Monument historique		Private	
Tour de Bois-Ruffin	Arrou	12th century Classified as Monument historique		Private	
Tour de l'Épaule	Gallardon	10th century Classified as Monument historique		Property of Gallardon	

== See also ==
- List of châteaux in Centre-Val de Loire
- List of châteaux in France
- List of castles in France
