= List of castles in the Centre-Val de Loire region =

This list of castles in the Centre-Val de Loire region is a list of medieval castles or châteaux forts in this French region.

Links in italics are links to articles in the French Wikipedia.

== Cher ==
Castles of which little or nothing remains include Château de Montrond.

| Name | Date | Condition | Image | Ownership / Access | Notes |
|---|---|---|---|---|---|
| Château d'Ainay-le-Vieil | 14th century | Intact | | Private | Part medieval, part Renaissance. |
| Château de Bannegon | | | | | |
| Château de Culan | 12-15th century | Restored | | Private | Renaissance additions. |
| Château du Grand-Besse | 15th century | Fragment | | | Keep survives, with later buildings. |
| Donjon de Jouy | 14th century | Ruins | | | |
| Château de Mehun-sur-Yèvre | 13-14th century | Ruins | | | |
| Château de Pesselières | 15-19th century | Rebuilt | | | |
| Château de Sancerre | | Ruins | | | |

== Eure-et-Loir ==
| Name | Date | Condition | Image | Ownership / Access | Notes |
|---|---|---|---|---|---|
| Château d'Anet | 14-19th century | Rebuilt | | Private; Access : Yes | Residence of Diane de Poitiers, the mistress of Henry II of France. |
| Château de Châteaudun | 12-16th century | Rebuilt | | Centre des monuments nationaux Access : Yes | Converted to Renaissance residence, the 12th-century keep survives. |
| Château de Levesville | 15-19th century | Rebuilt | | Private; Access : No | Converted to residence, towers survive. |
| Château de Maintenon | 13-19th century | Rebuilt | | Conseil départemental d'Eure-et-Loir; Access : Yes | Converted to residence, medieval keep and towers survive. |

== Indre ==
| Name | Date | Condition | Image | Ownership / Access | Notes |
|---|---|---|---|---|---|
| Château d'Azay-le-Ferron | 15th century | Fragment | | City of Tours | Medieval tower survives, incorporated into the 17th-century building. |
| Château de Brosse | 13-15th century | Ruins | | | |
| Château d'Ingrandes | 14-15th century | Restored | | | First built 10th century. |
| Château du Mont | 14-15th century | Restored | | | |
| Château de Sarzay | 14-15th century | Ruins | | Private (open to the public) | 15th-century tower survives intact. |

== Indre-et-Loire ==
| Name | Date | Condition | Image | Ownership / Access | Notes |
|---|---|---|---|---|---|
| Château d'Amboise | 11-16th century | Fragment | | | Extensively rebuilt by Charles VIII of France from 1492, largely demolished 18-19th centuries. |
| Château de la Celle-Guenand | 15th century | Rebuilt | | Private | Remodelled in the 17th century as a private residence. |
| Château de Chinon | 10-15th century | Restored | | | Royal castle, setting for the play and film The Lion in Winter. |
| Château de Cinq-Mars-la-Pile | | Ruins | | | |
| Château de la Guerche | 15th century | Intact | | | Restored 17th century. |
| Château de Langeais | 10-15th century | Intact | | | Ruins of the 10th-century keep survive, castle rebuilt from 1465, working drawbridge. |
| Château de Loches | 11-14th century | Ruins | | | Rebuilt by Henry II of England. |
| Château de Luynes | | Intact | | | |
| Château de Montbazon | 11-15th century | Ruins | | | Keep dates from c.1000, built by Fulk III, Count of Anjou. |
| Château de Montpoupon | | Rebuilt | | | |
| Château de Montrésor | c.1393 | Ruins | | | Renaissance mansion and ruins of medieval castle. |
| Château du Rivau | 1445 | Intact | | | |
| Château de Tours | | Fragment | | | Medieval tower survives with later building. |
| Château d'Ussé | 15-17th century | Rebuilt | | Private | Rebuilt from ruins from 1460s. |
| Château de Vaujours | 12-15th century | Ruins | | | |

== Loir-et-Cher ==
| Name | Date | Condition | Image | Ownership / Access | Notes |
|---|---|---|---|---|---|
| Château de Chaumont | 1465-1510 | Restored | | Museum | Modernised and restored in successive centuries, north wing demolished to open up views. |
| Château de Fougères-sur-Bièvre | 1475 | Intact | | | |
| Château de Lavardin | 12-15th century | Ruins | | | |
| Château de Matval | 13-15th century | Rebuilt | | | |
| Château de Montoire | 11-14th century | Ruins | | Commune | |
| Château de Montrichard | 11-12th century | Ruins | | | Originally built by Fulk III, Count of Anjou, dismantled by order of Henri IV of France, 1589. |
| Château du Moulin | 1480-1501 | Fragment | | | |
| Château de Vendôme | | Ruins | | | |

== Loiret ==
| Name | Date | Condition | Image | Ownership / Access | Notes |
|---|---|---|---|---|---|
| Château de Beaugency | 11th century | Ruins | | | |
| Château de Bellegarde | 14-18th century | Rebuilt | | | Known as Château des l'Hospital. |
| Château de Chamerolles | 16th century | Intact | | | Renaissance château, in form of medieval fortress. |
| Château de Châteaurenard | | Ruins | | | |
| Château de Châtillon-Coligny | | Ruins | | | |
| Château du Hallier | | Ruins | | | |
| Château de Meung-sur-Loire | 12-18th century | Rebuilt | | | |
| Château de Montpipeau | 12-18th century | Fragment | | | In the Rochecouart family from the 14th to the 18th century |
| Château de Sully-sur-Loire | 14-17th century | Intact | | Département du Loiret | On site of earlier castle, seat of the ducs de Sully until 1962. |
| Château de Yevre-le-Chatel | | Ruins | | | |

== See also ==
- List of castles in France
- List of châteaux in France
