= Gommerville =

Gommerville is the name of the following communes in France:

- Gommerville, Eure-et-Loir, in the Eure-et-Loir department
- Gommerville, Seine-Maritime, in the Seine-Maritime department
