= Orlu =

Orlu may refer to the following places:

- Orlu, Imo, city in Nigeria
- Orlu, Ariège, commune in France
- Orlu, Eure-et-Loir, commune in France
