= Crucey Solar Park =

Solar farm in Chartres, France

- Country: France
- Location: Chartres
- Coordinates: 48°38′38″N 1°05′59″E
- Status: Operational
- Construction began: 2009
- Commission date: 2012
- Owner: EDF Énergies Nouvelles

Solar farm
- Type: Flat-panel PV

Power generation
- Units operational: 741,150
- Nameplate capacity: 60 MW

The Crucey Solar Park is a 60 MW solar farm in France. It was built by EDF Énergies Nouvelles in the communes of Maillebois, Crucey-Villages, and Louvilliers-lès-Perche. It has 741,150 thin-film photovoltaics panels made by First Solar.

== See also ==
- Photovoltaic power station
- List of photovoltaic power stations
