= Château de Charbonnières (Eure-et-Loir) =

Château in Centre-Val de Loire, France

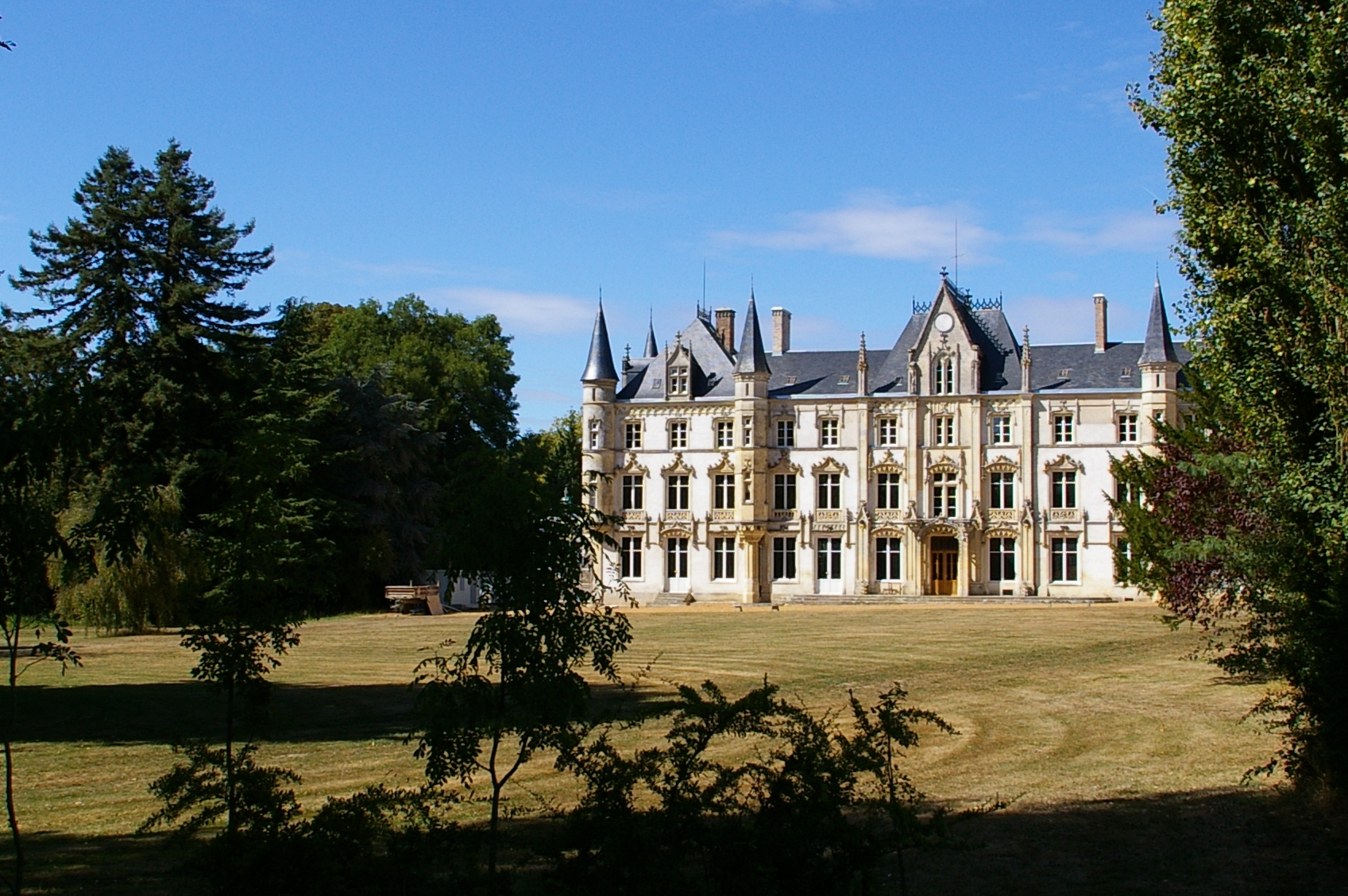
- Château de Charbonnières, August 2009

- Location within France
- 48°11′34″N 0°56′13″E
- Location: Charbonnières, Eure-et-Loir, France

Site notes
- Architectural style: Neo-Gothic

The Château de Charbonnières is a Neo-Gothic château located in Perche Nature Park in the commune of Charbonnières in the Eure-et-Loir department in northern France.

== History ==
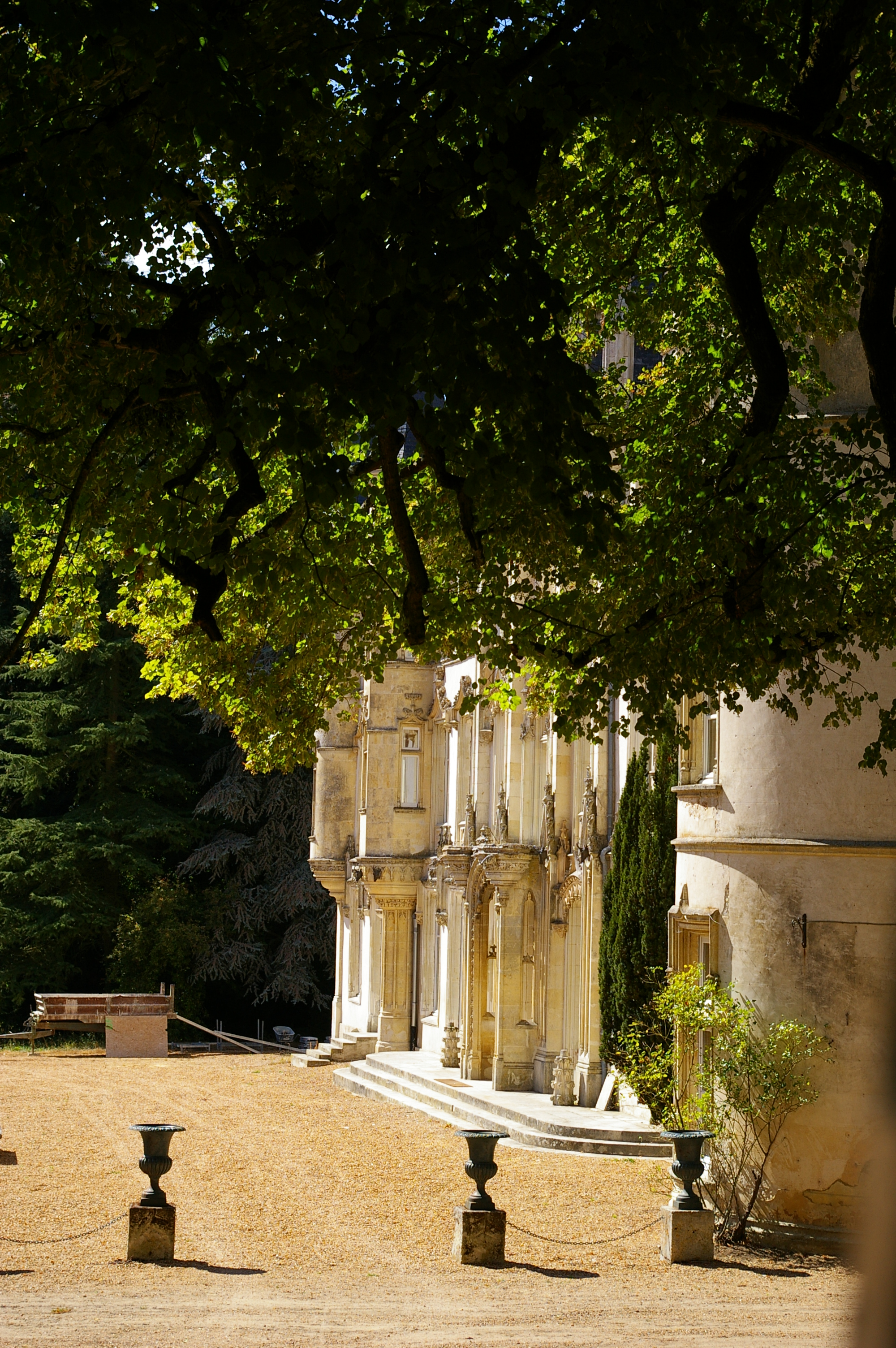
Entrance to the château

The land upon which the Château de Charbonnières rests was owned by Jean Guarin in 1472. The château was built on the foundations of a medieval building in the sixteenth century and was owned by Jehan d'Oynville, Seigneur (Lord) de Charbonnières, in 1557. King Henry IV was a frequent visitor. In 1600, it was owned by Antoine and César de Baux before passing into the Lesseville family.

It was expanded in the eighteenth century and, in the nineteenth century, Comte Auguste de Chamoy (Count of Chamois), inspired by Troubadour architecture, gave it its neo-Gothic style. His widow, the former Charlotte-Amélie de Grosourdy de Saint-Pierre (1804–1866), died at the château in 1866.

During World War II, the château was occupied by German forces.

=== 21st century ===
Beginning in 2007, the château underwent a four-year full restoration and renovation with attention to correct period design. The main building has 15 bedrooms, many with private salons. The château also has a variety of traditional public rooms, including a ballroom, library, and formal dining room. The top floor is an open area featuring a home theater and game room. In total, it was 3,000 m^{2} (32,000 sq ft) and is situated on a 32 ha (79-acre) riverside property plot.

In 2012, the château was listed for sale for $9 million but did not sell. In October 2017, the château was auctioned off, with no reserve, by Concierge Auctions. Expected to sell for 5 million euros, it was sold to a foreign buyer for excess of 1.2 million euros.

== See also ==
- List of châteaux in Eure-et-Loir
