= Saint-Maur, Cher =

Saint-Maur
- Commune
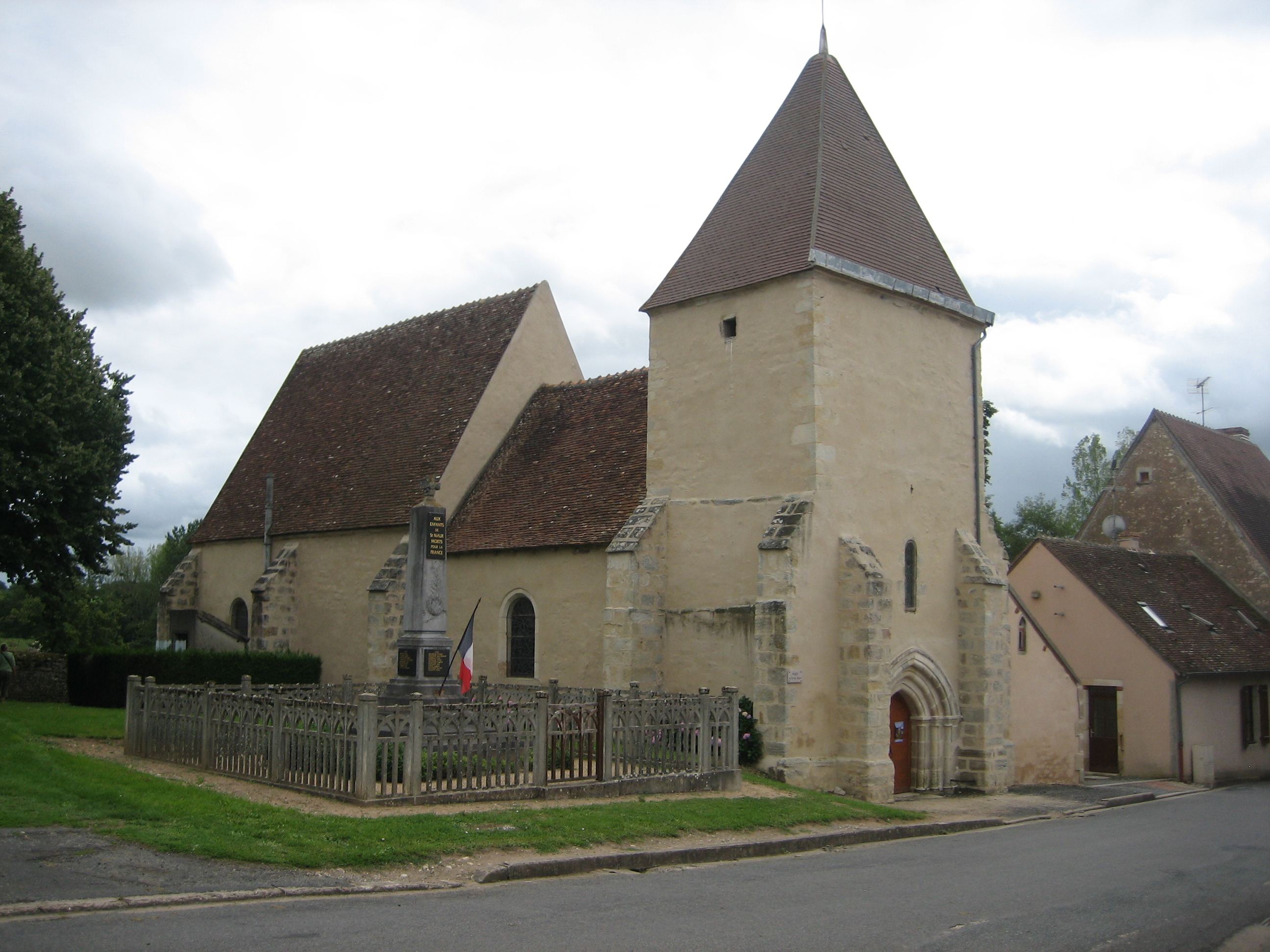
- The church in Saint-Maur
- Location of Saint-Maur
- Location within France Location within Centre-Val de Loire
- Coordinates: 46°34′51″N 2°17′58″E
- Country: France
- Region: Centre-Val de Loire
- Department: Cher
- Arrondissement: Saint-Amand-Montrond
- Canton: Châteaumeillant

Government
  - Mayor (2020–2026): Patrick Courzadet
- Area^{1}: 25.62 km^{2} (9.89 sq mi)
- Elevation: 273 m (896 ft)
- Highest elevation: 321 m (1,053 ft)
- Lowest elevation: 224 m (735 ft)
- Population (2023): 253
  - Density: 9.88/km^{2} (25.6/sq mi)
- Time zone: UTC+01:00 (CET)
  - Summer (DST): UTC+02:00 (CEST)
- INSEE/Postal code: 18225 /18270
- ^{1} French Land Register data, which excludes lakes, ponds, glaciers > 1 km^{2} (0.386 sq mi or 247 acres) and river estuaries.

Saint-Maur (French pronunciation: [sɛ̃ mɔʁ]) is a commune in the Cher department in the Centre-Val de Loire region of France.

== Geography ==
A farming area comprising the village and four hamlets situated by the banks of the small river Portefeuille, about 38 miles (61 km) south of Bourges at the junction of the D62 with the D65 and the D127 roads.

== Population ==
Historical population
Year	Pop.	±% p.a.
1968	445	—
1975	396	−1.65%
1982	329	−2.61%
1990	287	−1.69%
1999	295	+0.31%
2007	286	−0.39%
2012	242	−3.29%
2017	295	+4.04%
2023	253	−2.53%
Source: INSEE

== Sights ==
- The church of St. Maur, dating from the thirteenth century.
- Two fifteenth-century castles, Mazères and Grande Besse.
- A dolmen, known as the "Pierre des Fées" (fairy stone).

== See also ==
- Communes of the Cher department
