= Château de Levesville =

15th-century French château

Coordinates: 48°29′24″N 1°25′58″E

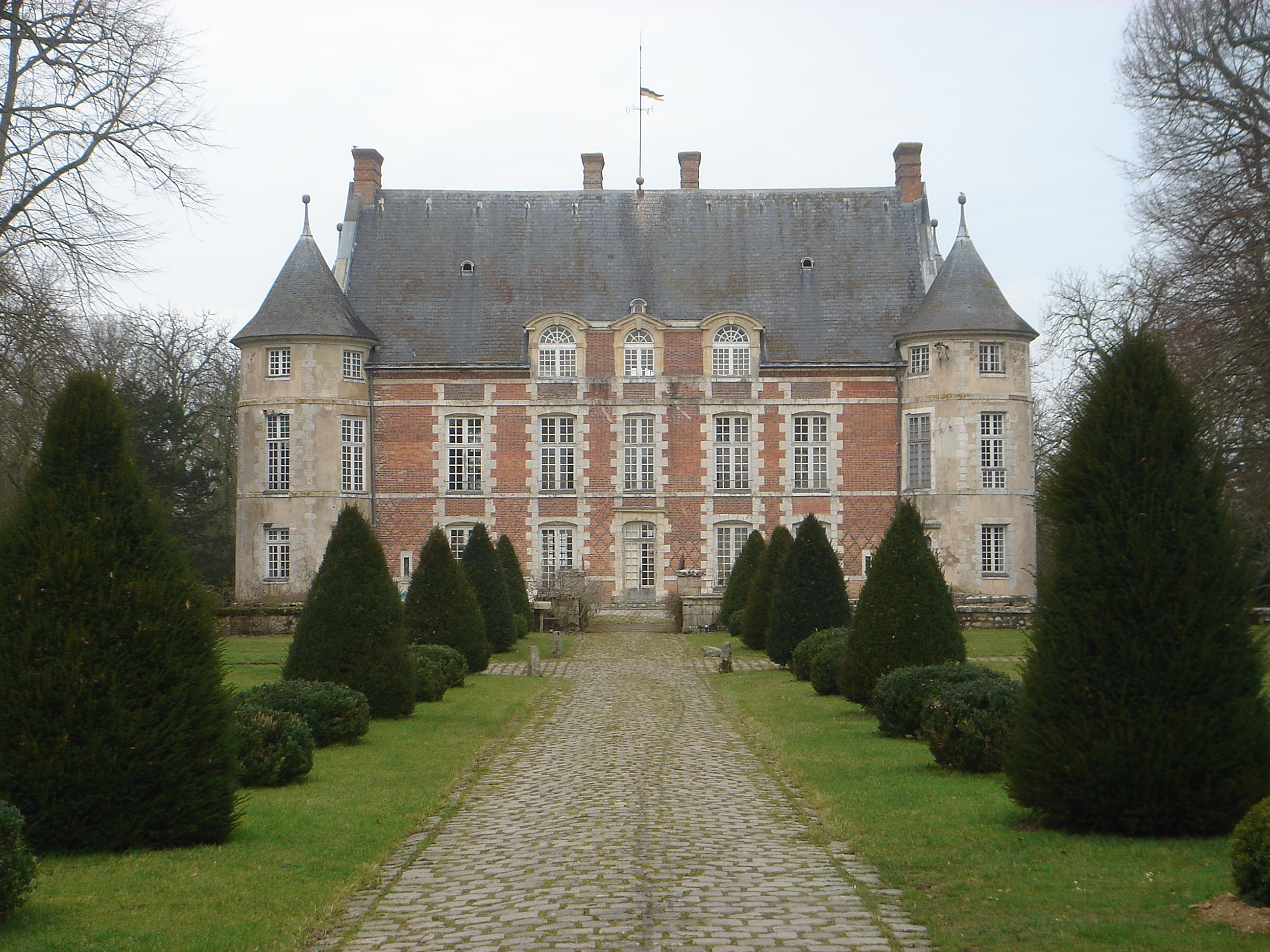
Château de Leveville

Château de Levéville or Levesville, one of the Châteaux of the Loire Valley, is situated in Bailleau-l'Évêque on the outskirts of Chartres in the Eure-et-Loir department of France. The castle was built in the 15th century and remodelled in the 17th and later centuries.

== History ==
The château stands on a plateau above the city of Chartres. The first owners, whose name was Levéville (Levoisvilla, Levaisvilla or Levesvilla), were mentioned at the end of the 11th century in the chartulary of the abbeys of Saint-Père Abbey in Chartres and Notre-Dame de Josaphat in Lèves. As vassals of the Bishops of Chartres, the lords of Leveville were passionate defenders of the early Dukes of Chartres.

For more than two centuries, the knights of Leveville were present in the history of Chartres and its region. According to several drawings from the Gaignières collection, the first local noblemen wore suits of armour.

It was probably Michel le Vacher who, between 1479 and 1506, ordered a new castle to be built with the main residential structure encircled by a moat. The courtyard was enclosed by walls, and towers with artillery pieces stood on each side. A second wall protected the castle, the courtyard and moats. There were also several towers and the wall was also encircled by the moat.

In April 1656, all the land of Levéville and its surroundings was given the status of a district.

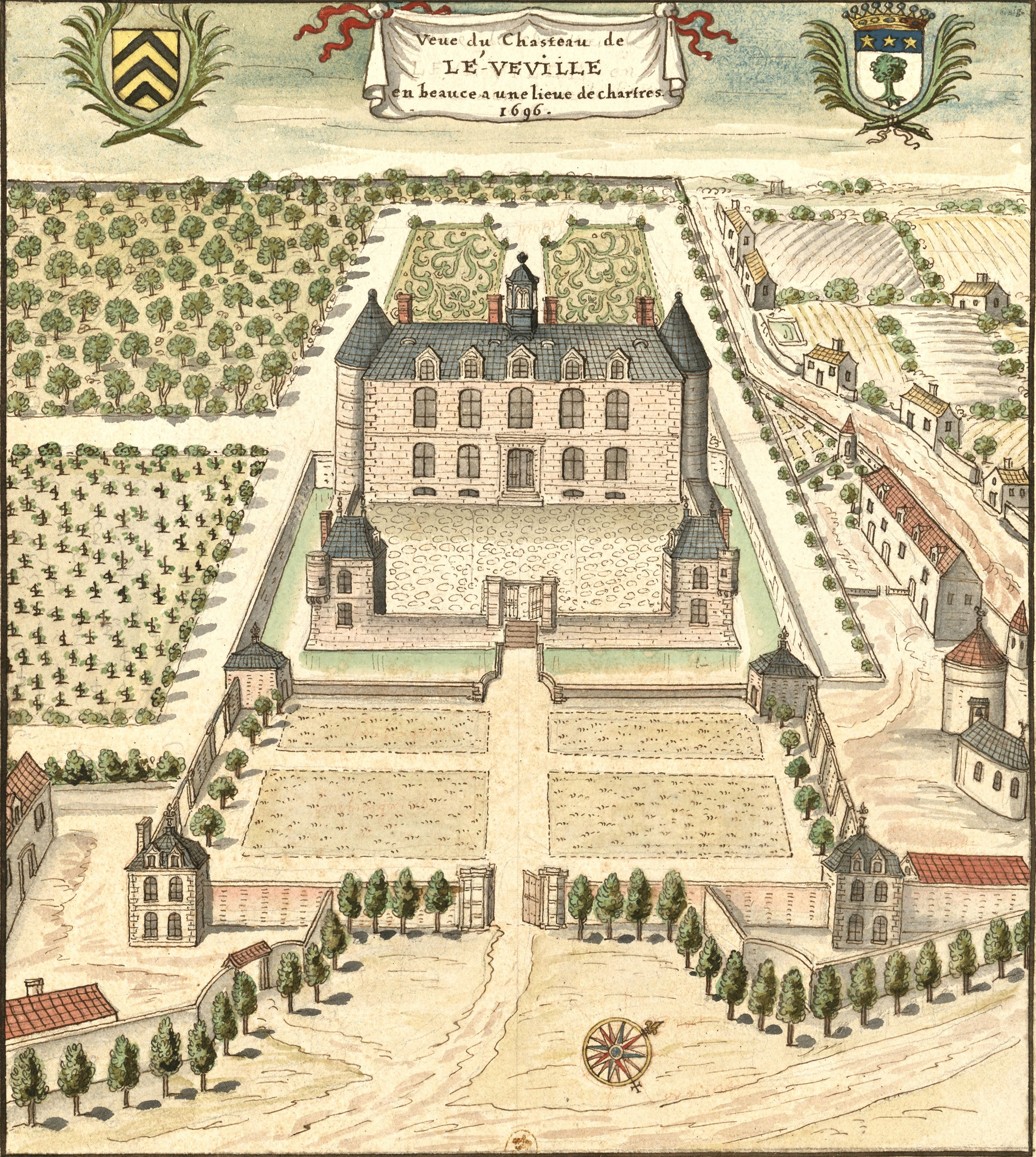
François Roger de Gaignières: Château de Levesville (1696)

In July 1610, François III Briçonnet, the reign counselor and administrator of the Paris Chamber of Accounts, became the new owner of the castle. After his marriage to Anne des Landes, the Lady of Magneville, he issued an order for the castle to be reconstructed in the style of Louis XIII. The result was a multicolored brick facade for the right wing. Window dormers and a belfry with a dome on pillars were also erected. Probably two of four towers and a drawbridge were demolished at that time. These two towers were modified into a pavilion with small turrets and loopholes. The couple also built the Mary Magdalene Chapel not far from the castle, because Bailleau Church was two miles away.

In 1813, the castle with all the furniture was sold to Nicolas François Barthélémy, former inspector of this area, residing in Paris. After his death the castle was passed to his sons: Edward (1803–1880) and August (1802–1886). According to local traditions, the Barthélémy brothers were told to be close friends of Alexandre Dumas, who made several visits to Levéville. It was rumored he was in love with Madam August, née Pauline de Baltus.

Both the Barthélémy brothers resided in Levéville castle, undertaking many improvements between 1860 and 1880. Large slate roofing was replaced by a lighter design. Three central windows on the ground floor provide a view of the facade from the side of the courtyard. Two small oval windows were removed and replaced by three windows in stone. Small apertures were made in the towers. The antechamber was marbled and ornate panels decorated the area in front of each door.

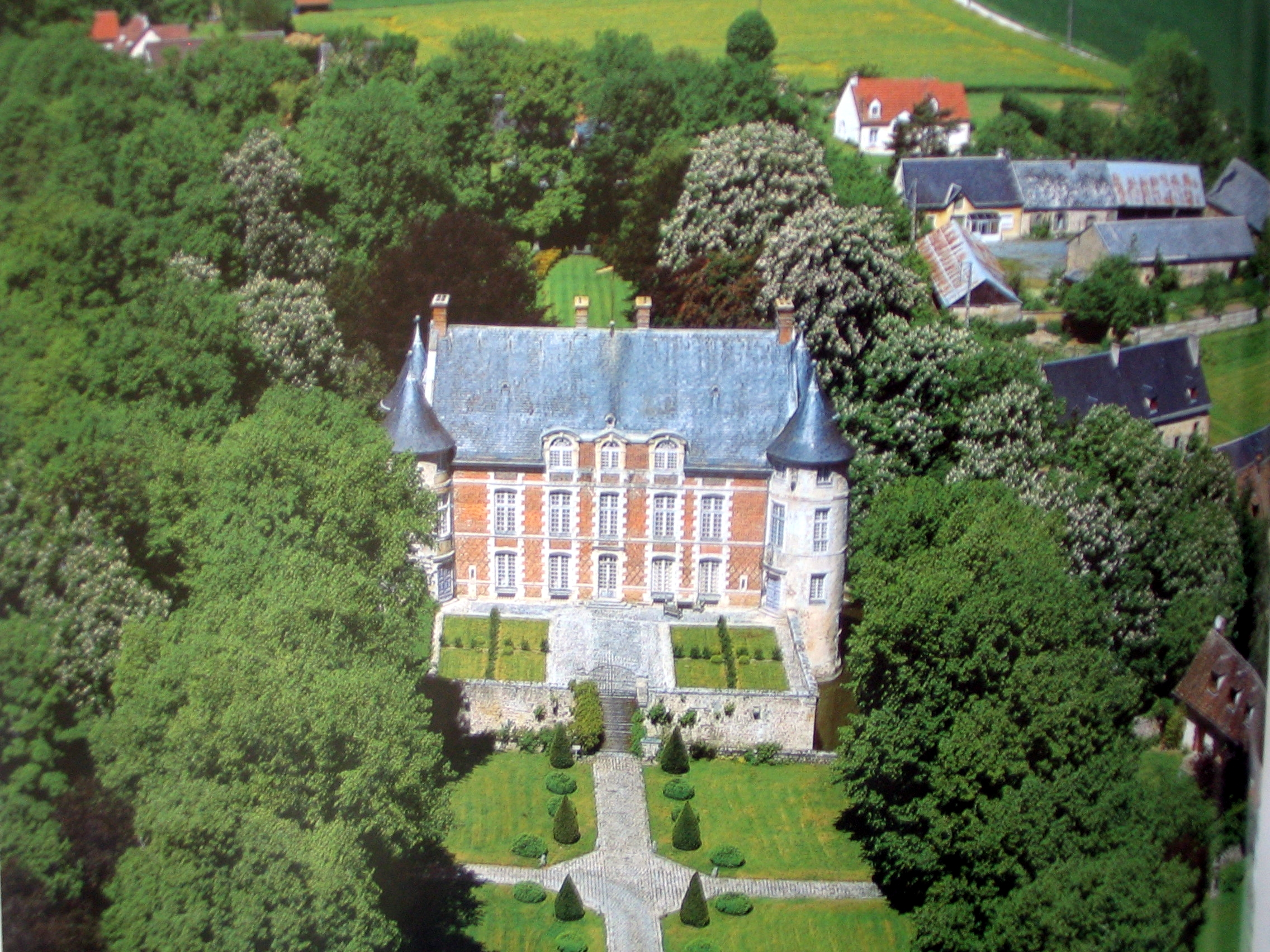
Leveville On the Wing

The château was plundered during the Second World War. During the Nazi occupation, the Germans used it as a control center until it was taken by US troops in 1944. After the war, the castle and all its utility structures were leased to the Ministry of Justice from 1946 to 1956.

The new garden was altered in 1971 and it was enlarged by the well-preserved remains of the old garden. Behind the château a lot of hornbeam, yew and shrubbery were planted. A new pond with hornbeam plants was added.

In 1976, Château de Levéville was inscribed on the list of monuments historiques by the French Ministry of Culture.

In 2005, the château was sold to Alexey Semin, the chairman of the board of directors of the ASG Investment group of companies. On the website of the International Antique Institute of ASG, it is possible to make a 3D tour throughout the castle

== Sources ==
- Cercle de recherches genealogiques du Perche-Goiet
- GeneaWiki. 28022 - Bailleau-l'Évêque
- le blog francois. juignet

== See also ==
- List of châteaux in Eure-et-Loir
