= Mittainvilliers =

Commune in Eure-et-Loir, France

- Part of Mittainvilliers-Vérigny
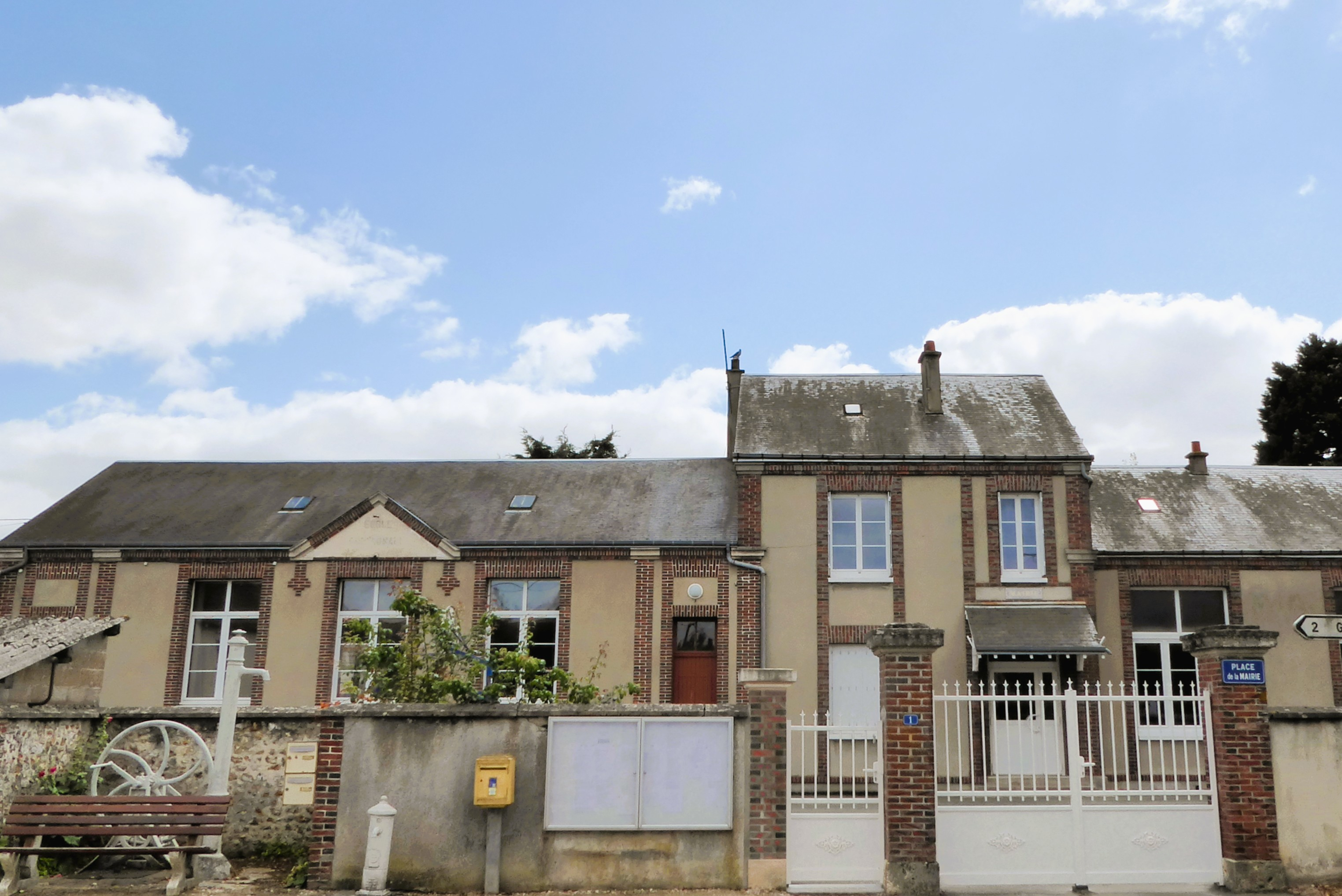
- Town hall
- Location of Mittainvilliers
- Location within France Location within Centre-Val de Loire
- Coordinates: 48°29′56″N 1°18′39″E
- Country: France
- Region: Centre-Val de Loire
- Department: Eure-et-Loir
- Arrondissement: Chartres
- Canton: Illiers-Combray
- Commune: Mittainvilliers-Vérigny
- Area^{1}: 11.72 km^{2} (4.53 sq mi)
- Elevation: 228 m (748 ft)
- Highest elevation: 239 m (784 ft)
- Lowest elevation: 203 m (666 ft)
- Population (2013): 508
  - Density: 43.3/km^{2} (112/sq mi)
- Time zone: UTC+01:00 (CET)
  - Summer (DST): UTC+02:00 (CEST)
- Postal code: 28190
- ^{1} French Land Register data, which excludes lakes, ponds, glaciers > 1 km^{2} (0.386 sq mi or 247 acres) and river estuaries.

Mittainvilliers (French pronunciation: [mitɛ̃vilje]) is a former commune in the Eure-et-Loir department in northern France. On 1 January 2016, it was merged into the new commune of Mittainvilliers-Vérigny.

== Population ==
Historical population
Year	Pop.	±% p.a.
1962	207	—
1968	215	+0.63%
1975	210	−0.34%
1982	304	+5.43%
1990	362	+2.21%
1999	390	+0.83%
2013	508	+1.91%
Source: EHESS and INSEE

== See also ==
- Communes of the Eure-et-Loir department
