= Mittainvilliers-Vérigny =

- Commune
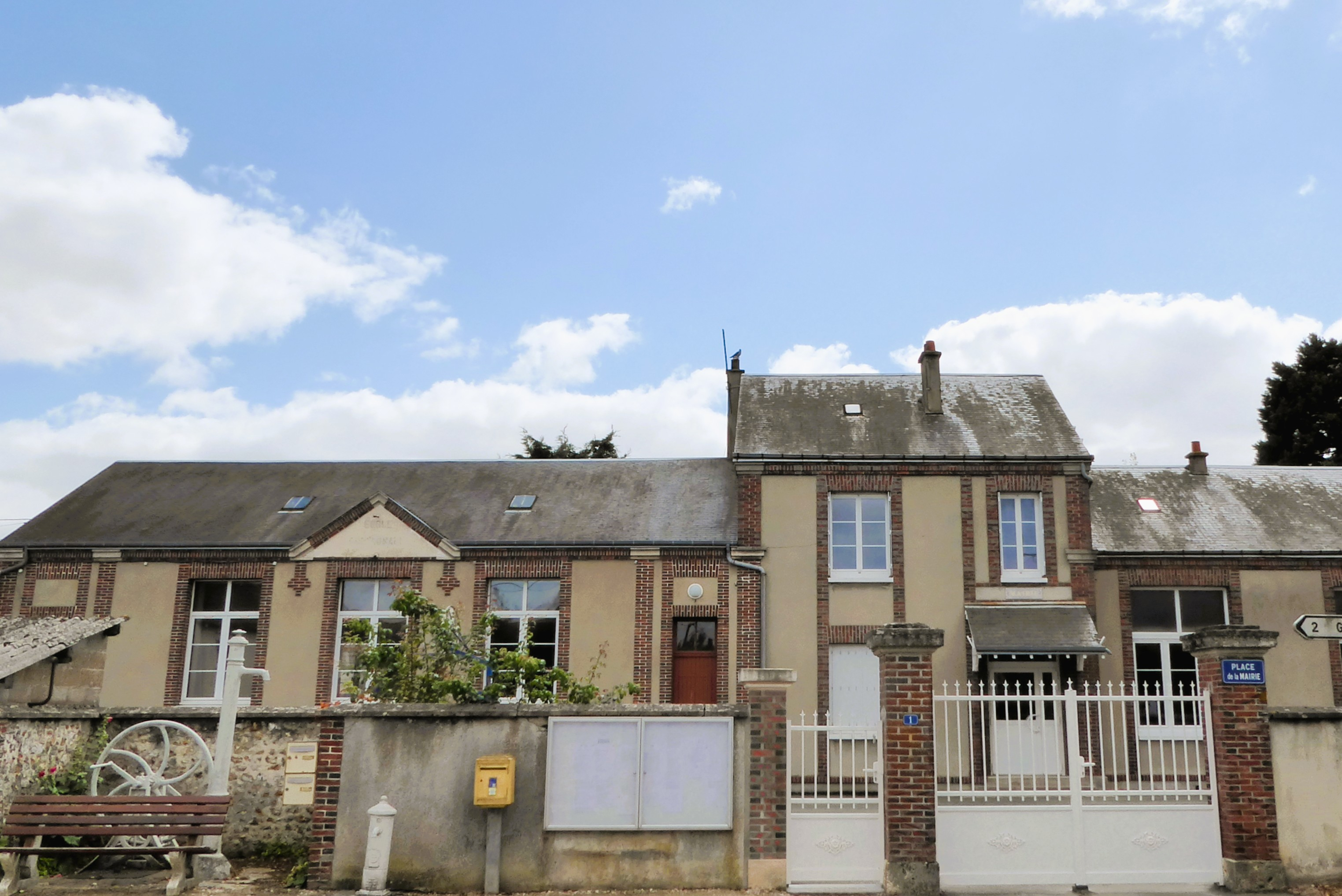
- The town hall and school in Mittainvilliers-Vérigny
- Location of Mittainvilliers-Vérigny
- Location within France Location within Centre-Val de Loire
- Coordinates: 48°29′56″N 1°18′36″E
- Country: France
- Region: Centre-Val de Loire
- Department: Eure-et-Loir
- Arrondissement: Chartres
- Canton: Illiers-Combray
- Intercommunality: CA Chartres Métropole

Government
  - Mayor (2020–2026): Mickaël Tachat
- Area^{1}: 24.76 km^{2} (9.56 sq mi)
- Population (2023): 801
  - Density: 32.4/km^{2} (83.8/sq mi)
- Time zone: UTC+01:00 (CET)
  - Summer (DST): UTC+02:00 (CEST)
- INSEE/Postal code: 28254 /28190
- ^{1} French Land Register data, which excludes lakes, ponds, glaciers > 1 km^{2} (0.386 sq mi or 247 acres) and river estuaries.

Mittainvilliers-Vérigny (French pronunciation: [mitɛ̃vilje veʁiɲi]) is a commune in the Eure-et-Loir department of northern France. The municipality was established on 1 January 2016 by merger of the former communes of Mittainvilliers and Vérigny.

== See also ==
- Communes of the Eure-et-Loir department
