= Éole-en-Beauce =

- Commune
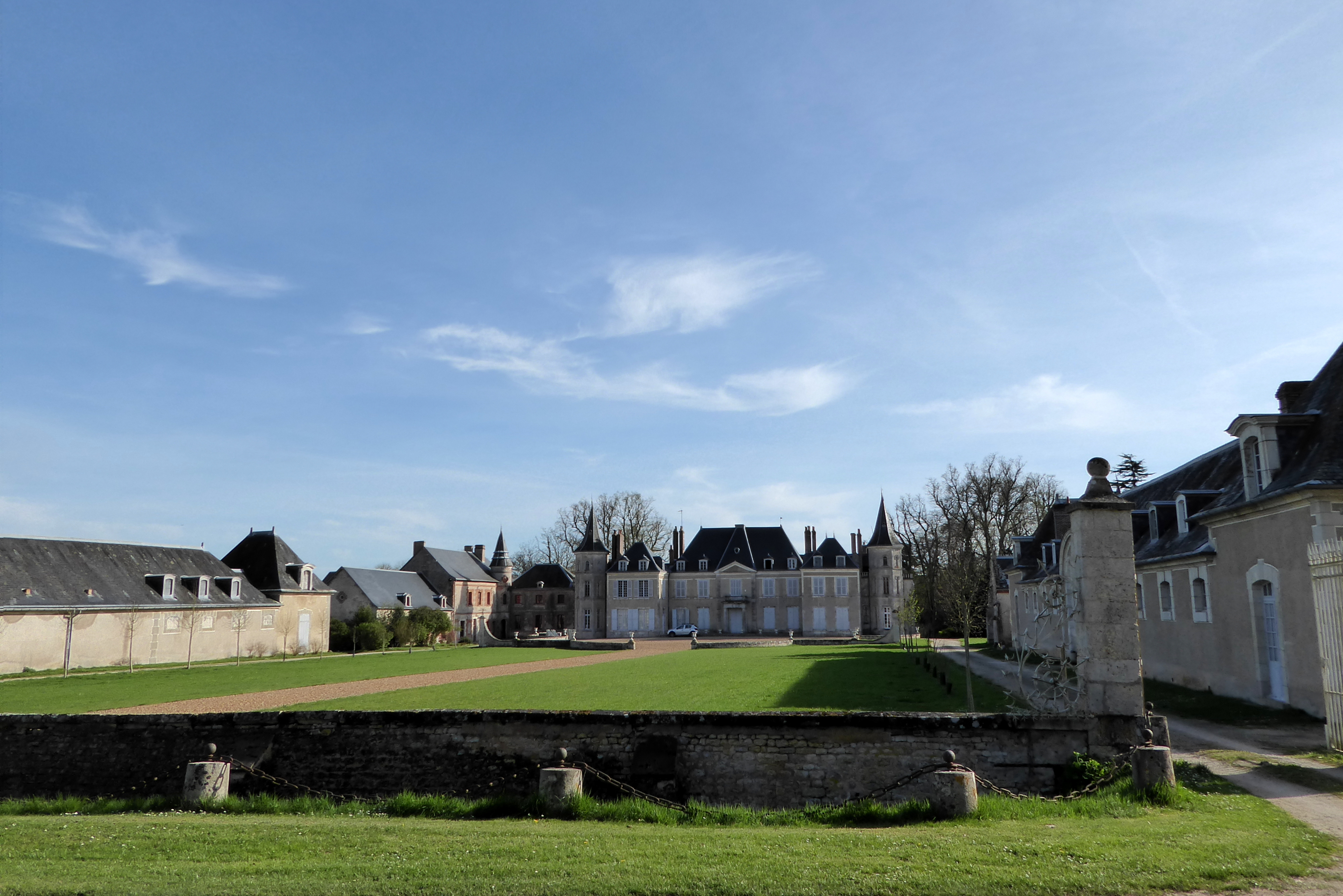
- The chateau of Cambray in Germignonville
- Location of Éole-en-Beauce
- Location within France Location within Centre-Val de Loire
- Coordinates: 48°12′58″N 1°42′11″E
- Country: France
- Region: Centre-Val de Loire
- Department: Eure-et-Loir
- Arrondissement: Chartres
- Canton: Les Villages Vovéens
- Intercommunality: Cœur de Beauce

Government
  - Mayor (2020–2026): Julien Birre
- Area^{1}: 102.86 km^{2} (39.71 sq mi)
- Population (2023): 1,238
  - Density: 12.04/km^{2} (31.17/sq mi)
- Time zone: UTC+01:00 (CET)
  - Summer (DST): UTC+02:00 (CEST)
- INSEE/Postal code: 28406 /28150
- ^{1} French Land Register data, which excludes lakes, ponds, glaciers > 1 km^{2} (0.386 sq mi or 247 acres) and river estuaries.

Éole-en-Beauce (French pronunciation: [eɔl ɑ̃ bos], literally Éole in Beauce) is a commune in the Eure-et-Loir department of northern France. The municipality was established on 1 January 2016 by merger of the former communes of Viabon, Baignolet, Fains-la-Folie and Germignonville. On 1 January 2019 the former commune of Villeau was merged into Éole-en-Beauce.

== See also ==
- Communes of the Eure-et-Loir department
