= Château de Châteauneuf (Eure-et-Loir) =

Castle in Centre-Val de Loire, France

Château de Châteauneuf was a castle in Châteauneuf-en-Thymerais, Eure-et-Loir, France. It was destroyed in the 16th century.

== History ==
The castle was slighted by King Henry I of England in 1169, following the destruction of Chennebrun, located on the left bank of the Avre, by the French in 1168. King Henry II of England, burned the castle and it was rebuilt in 1189 by Hughes III du Chatel, lord of Thymerais. King Louis VII of France visited the castle on the occasion of the inauguration of the fair of Saint-Jacques Boutaincourt.

== See also ==
- List of châteaux in Eure-et-Loir
