= Villeau =

- Part of Éole-en-Beauce
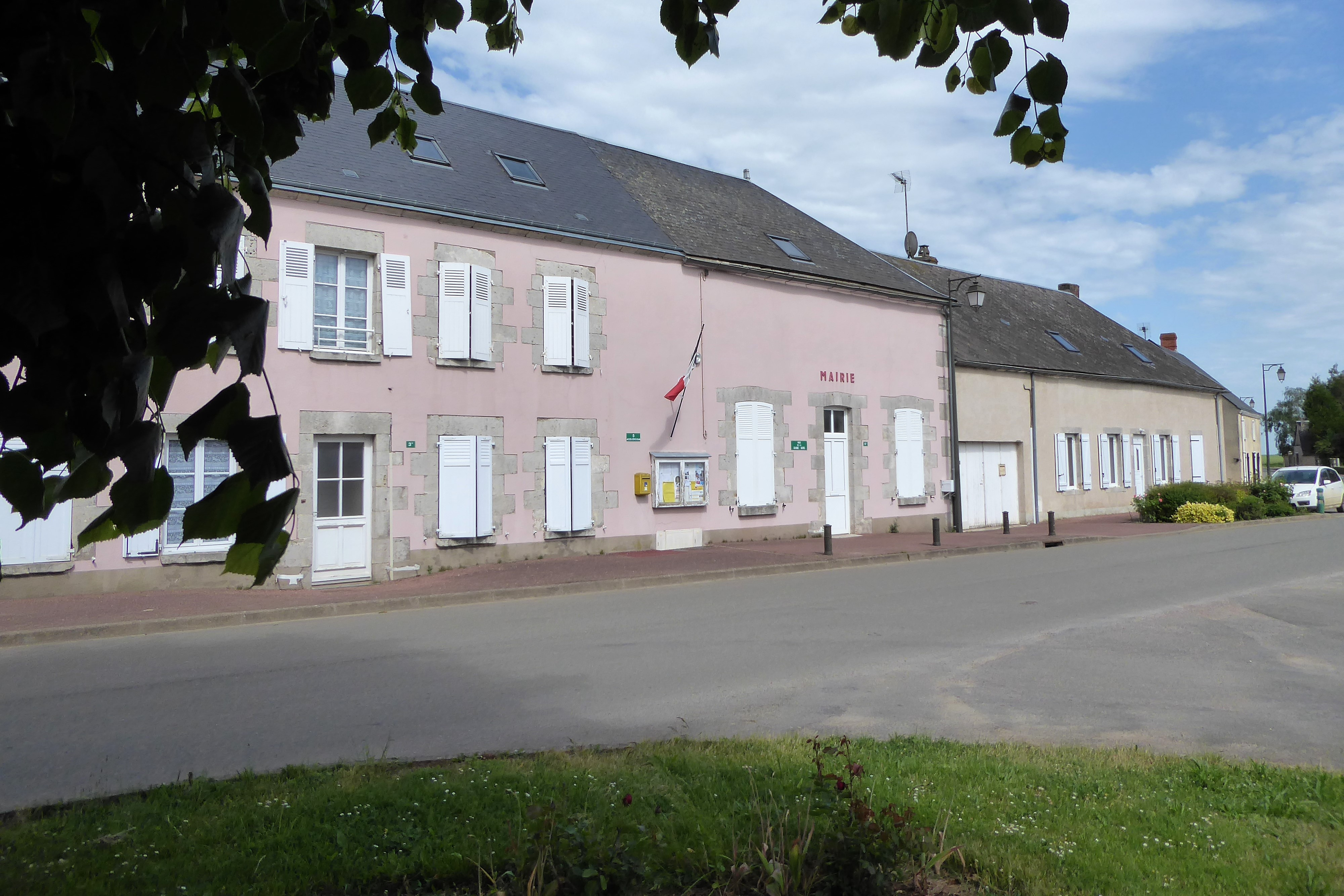
- Town hall
- Location of Villeau
- Location within France Location within Centre-Val de Loire
- Coordinates: 48°14′29″N 1°36′01″E
- Country: France
- Region: Centre-Val de Loire
- Department: Eure-et-Loir
- Arrondissement: Chartres
- Canton: Voves
- Commune: Éole-en-Beauce
- Area^{1}: 13.79 km^{2} (5.32 sq mi)
- Elevation: 144 m (472 ft)
- Highest elevation: 148 m (486 ft)
- Lowest elevation: 139 m (456 ft)
- Population (2023): 153
  - Density: 11.1/km^{2} (28.7/sq mi)
- Time zone: UTC+01:00 (CET)
  - Summer (DST): UTC+02:00 (CEST)
- Postal code: 28150
- ^{1} French Land Register data, which excludes lakes, ponds, glaciers > 1 km^{2} (0.386 sq mi or 247 acres) and river estuaries.

Villeau (French pronunciation: [vilo]) is a former commune in the Eure-et-Loir department in northern France. On 1 January 2019, it was merged into the commune of Éole-en-Beauce.

== See also ==
- Communes of the Eure-et-Loir department
