= Illiers-Combray =

- Commune
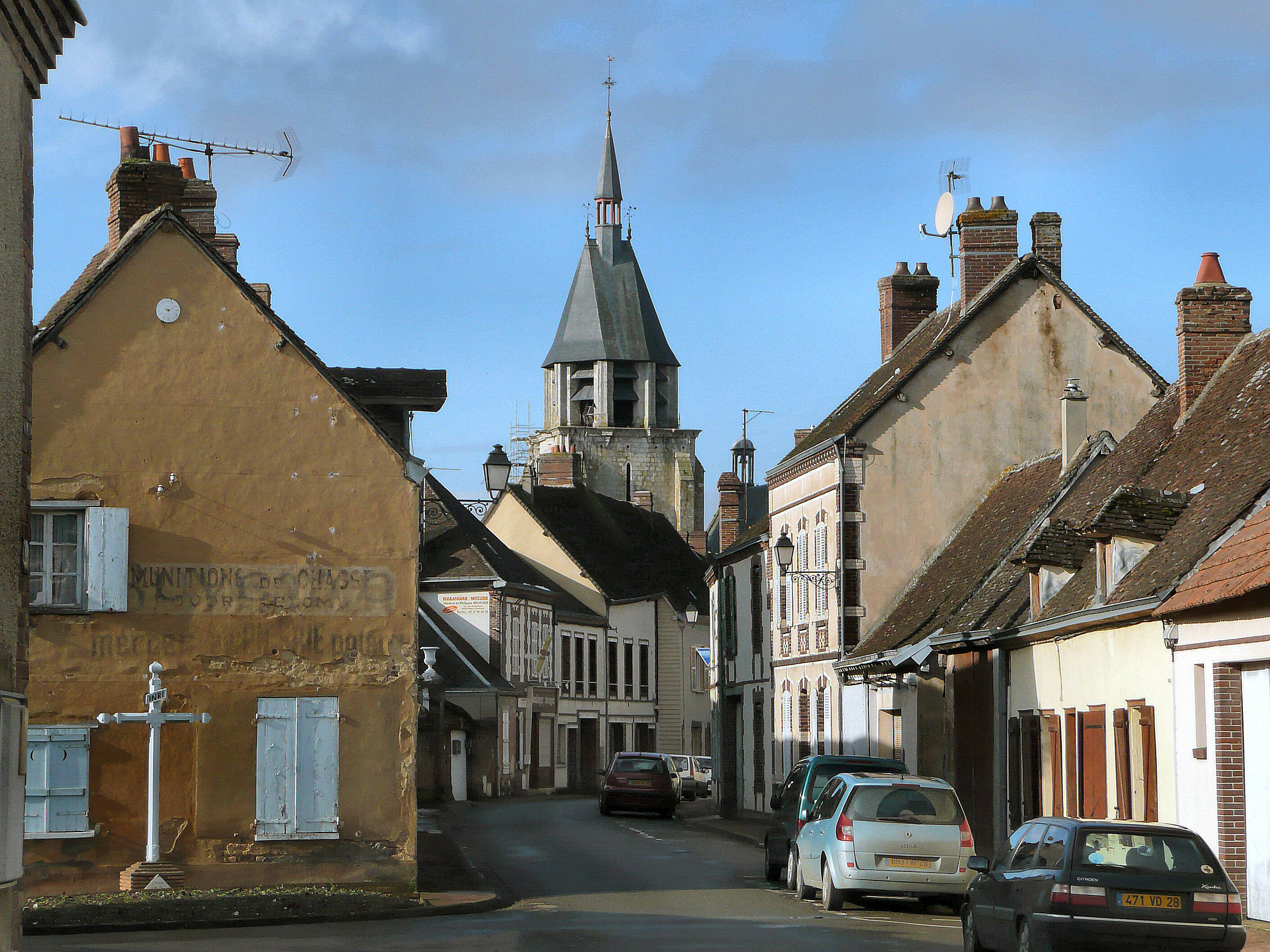
- The church and surroundings in Illiers-Combray

- Coat of arms
- Location of Illiers-Combray
- Location within France Location within Centre-Val de Loire
- Coordinates: 48°18′04″N 1°14′54″E
- Country: France
- Region: Centre-Val de Loire
- Department: Eure-et-Loir
- Arrondissement: Chartres
- Canton: Illiers-Combray
- Intercommunality: Entre Beauce et Perche

Government
  - Mayor (2020–2026): Bernard Puyenchet
- Area^{1}: 33.60 km^{2} (12.97 sq mi)
- Elevation: 162 m (531 ft)
- Highest elevation: 204 m (669 ft)
- Lowest elevation: 144 m (472 ft)
- Population (2023): 3,210
  - Density: 95.5/km^{2} (247/sq mi)
- Time zone: UTC+01:00 (CET)
  - Summer (DST): UTC+02:00 (CEST)
- INSEE/Postal code: 28196 /28120
- ^{1} French Land Register data, which excludes lakes, ponds, glaciers > 1 km^{2} (0.386 sq mi or 247 acres) and river estuaries.

Illiers-Combray (French pronunciation: [ilje kɔ̃bʁɛ]) is a commune in the Eure-et-Loir department in north central France.

== Population ==
Historical population

Year	Pop.	±% p.a.
1793	3,170	—
1800	2,617	−2.70%
1806	2,829	+1.31%
1821	2,473	−0.89%
1831	2,937	+1.73%
1836	3,069	+0.88%
1841	2,916	−1.02%
1846	3,159	+1.61%
1851	3,136	−0.15%
1856	3,100	−0.23%
1861	3,003	−0.63%
1866	3,005	+0.01%
1872	2,993	−0.07%
1876	2,997	+0.03%
1881	2,795	−1.39%
1886	2,831	+0.26%
1891	2,860	+0.20%
1896	2,795	−0.46%
1901	2,812	+0.12%

Year	Pop.	±% p.a.
1906	3,035	+1.54%
1911	2,985	−0.33%
1921	2,790	−0.67%
1926	2,963	+1.21%
1931	2,734	−1.60%
1936	2,875	+1.01%
1946	3,017	+0.48%
1954	2,937	−0.34%
1962	3,089	+0.63%
1968	2,971	−0.65%
1975	3,407	+1.98%
1982	3,333	−0.31%
1990	3,329	−0.02%
1999	3,226	−0.35%
2007	3,197	−0.11%
2012	3,427	+1.40%
2017	3,324	−0.61%
2023	3,210	−0.58%

Source: EHESS and INSEE (1968–2023)

== Literature ==
Combray was the writer Marcel Proust's name for the village of Illiers (near the Cathedral town of Chartres), vividly depicted by him in the opening chapters of his vast semi-autobiographical novel In Search of Lost Time.

The home of Proust's "Aunt Léonie" in the heart of the village, where he spent much of his childhood, has been transformed into a museum to the writer's memory. It provides visitors with a delightful view of 19th-century provincial life as well as of the many Proustian mementos on display.

It should be added that Proust scholars have recently claimed his descriptions of "Combray" owe as much to the author's stays in his uncle's home in Auteuil, near Paris, as to Illiers-Combray.

As a tribute to Proust's literary masterpiece, the people of Illiers decided, in 1971, to change the town's name to Illiers-Combray, on the occasion of the centenary of the author's birth.

== Twinning ==
Illiers-Combray is twinned with an English village, Coniston, Cumbria, the home of John Ruskin. Ruskin's work was a source of inspiration to Proust.

== See also ==
- Communes of the Eure-et-Loir department
