= Château de Bannegon =

Castle in Centre-Val de Loire, France

Coordinates: 46°48′07″N 02°42′49″E

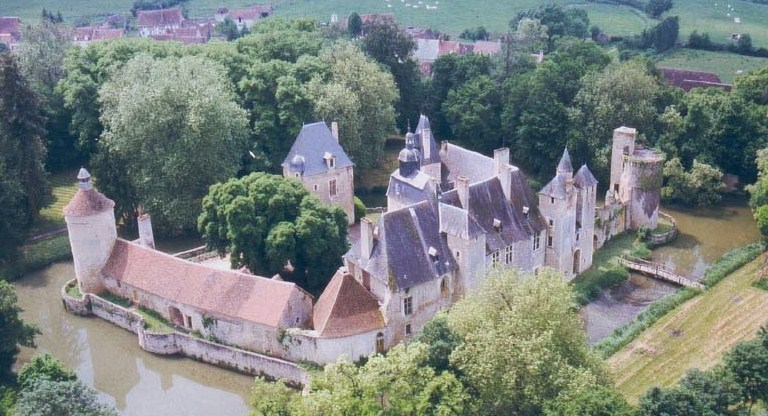

The Château de Bannegon is a ruined castle in the commune of Bannegon in the Cher département of France.

It has been listed since 1965 as a monument historique by the French Ministry of Culture.

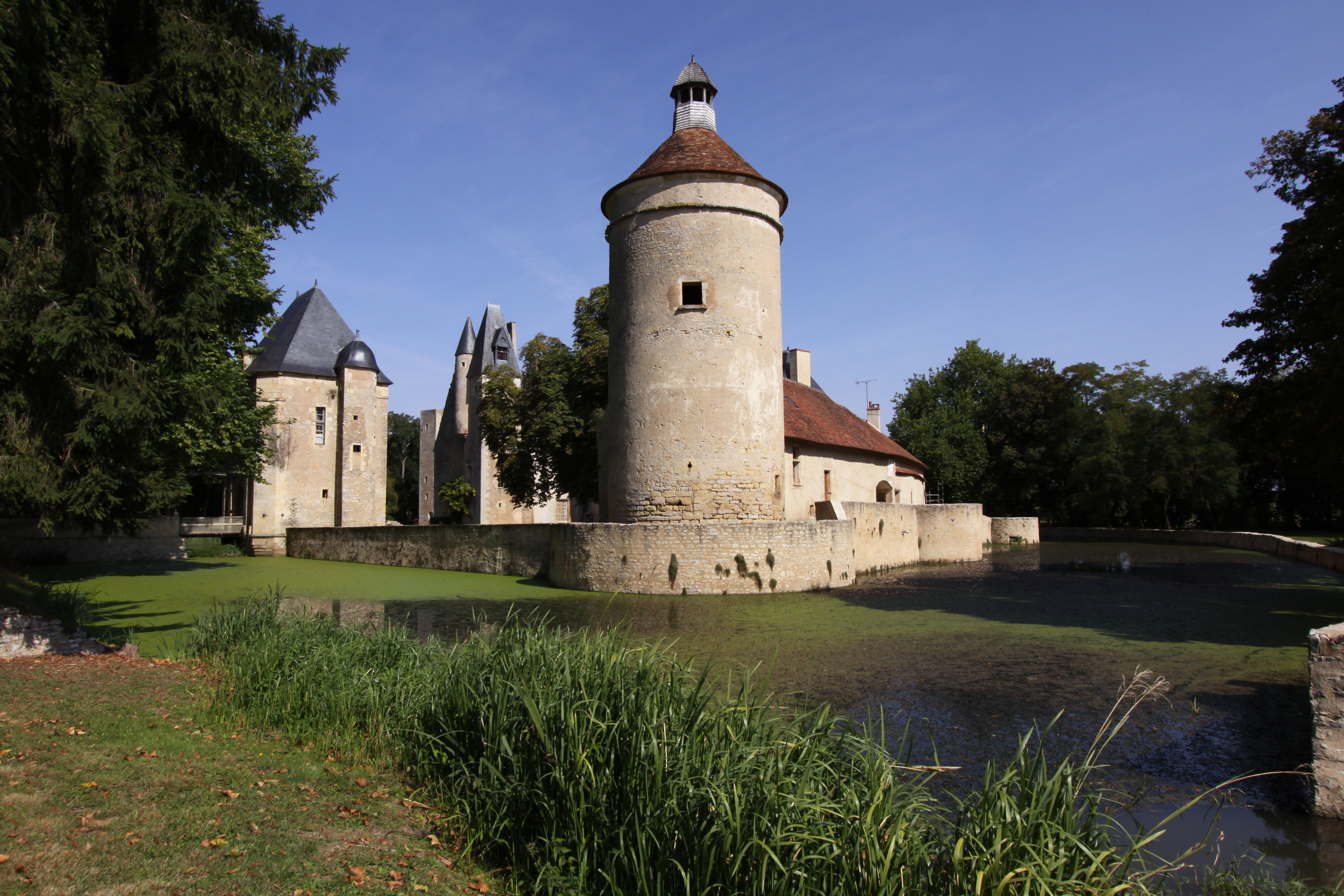
Tower of the Barres

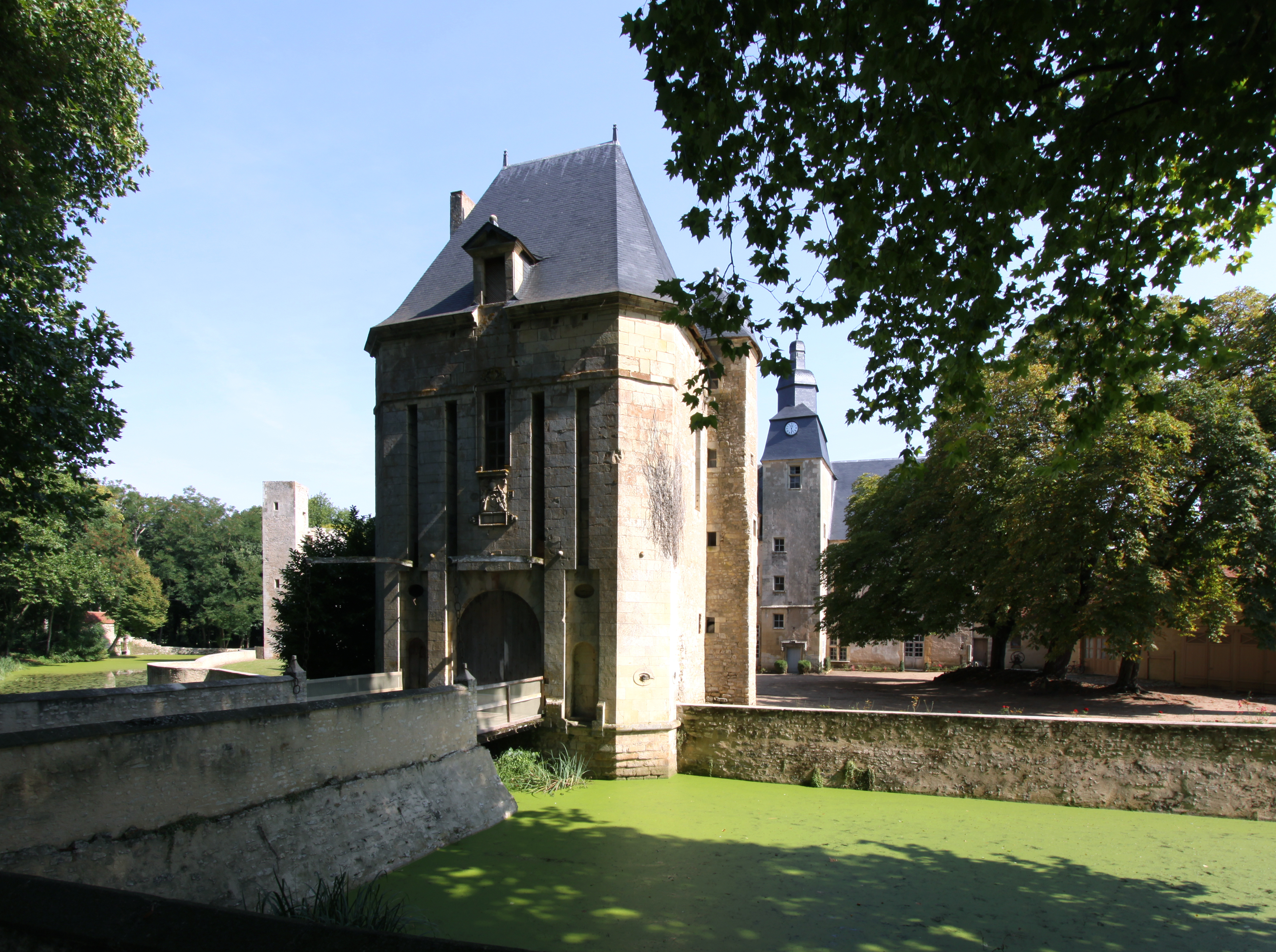
The drawbridge

== See also ==
- List of castles in France
