= Charbonnières, Eure-et-Loir =

Charbonnières
- Commune
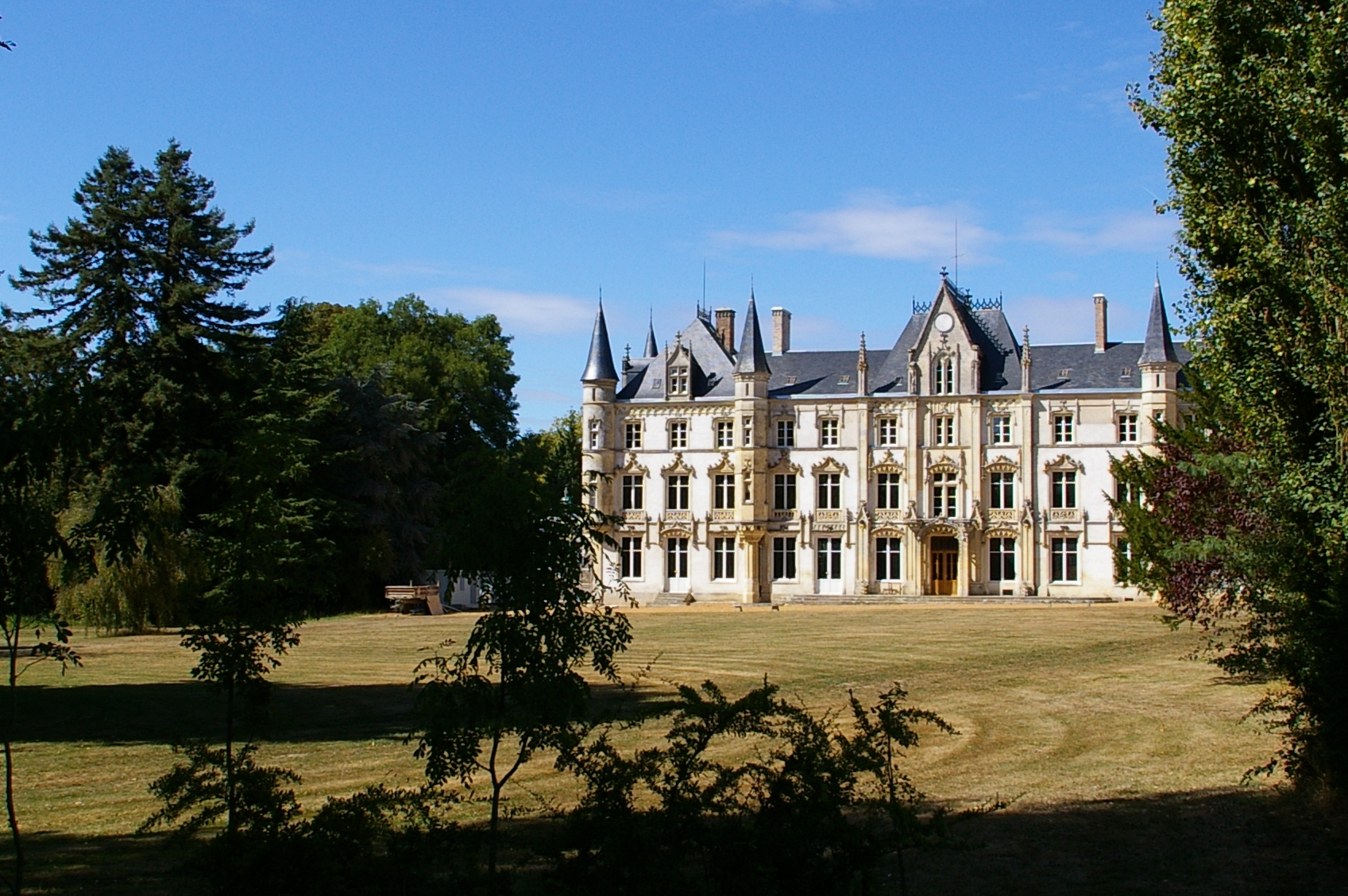
- Château de Charbonnières
- Location of Charbonnières
- Location within France Location within Centre-Val de Loire
- Coordinates: 48°11′34″N 0°56′13″E
- Country: France
- Region: Centre-Val de Loire
- Department: Eure-et-Loir
- Arrondissement: Nogent-le-Rotrou
- Canton: Brou
- Intercommunality: Perche

Government
  - Mayor (2020–2026): Marc Aubry
- Area^{1}: 20.91 km^{2} (8.07 sq mi)
- Elevation: 234 m (768 ft)
- Highest elevation: 245 m (804 ft)
- Lowest elevation: 192 m (630 ft)
- Population (2023): 263
  - Density: 12.6/km^{2} (32.6/sq mi)
- Time zone: UTC+01:00 (CET)
  - Summer (DST): UTC+02:00 (CEST)
- INSEE/Postal code: 28080 /28330
- ^{1} French Land Register data, which excludes lakes, ponds, glaciers > 1 km^{2} (0.386 sq mi or 247 acres) and river estuaries.

Charbonnières (French pronunciation: [ʃaʁbɔnjɛʁ]) is a commune in the Eure-et-Loir department in northern France.

== Population ==
Historical population
Year	Pop.	±% p.a.
1968	455	—
1975	404	−1.68%
1982	311	−3.67%
1990	258	−2.31%
1999	260	+0.09%
2007	257	−0.14%
2012	259	+0.16%
2017	253	−0.47%
2023	263	+0.65%
Source: INSEE

== See also ==
- Communes of the Eure-et-Loir department
- Château de Charbonnières (Eure-et-Loir)
