= Gommerville, Seine-Maritime =

Gommerville
- Commune
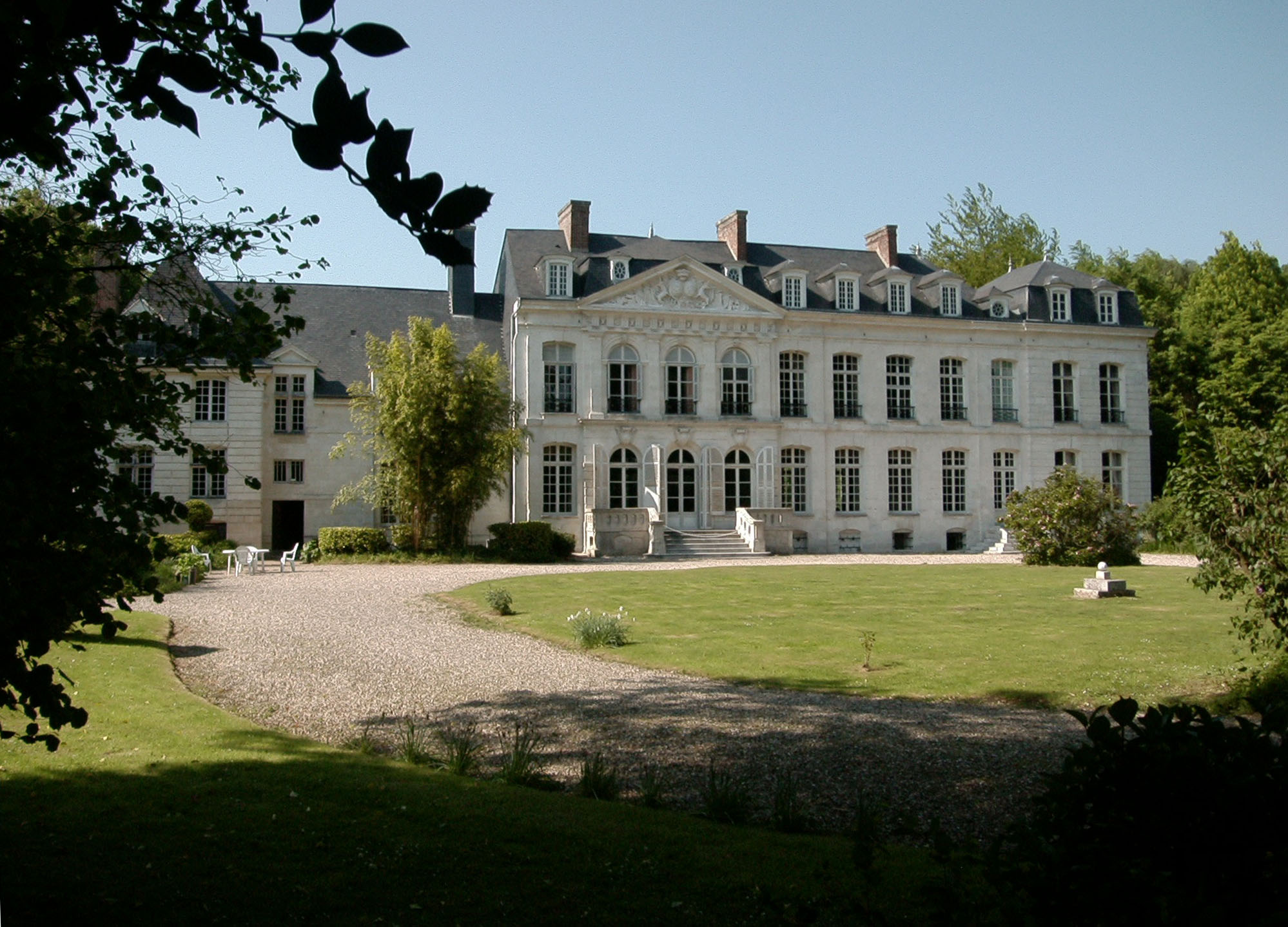
- The chateau of Filieres

- Coat of arms
- Location of Gommerville
- Location within France Location within Normandy
- Coordinates: 49°33′28″N 0°22′04″E
- Country: France
- Region: Normandy
- Department: Seine-Maritime
- Arrondissement: Le Havre
- Canton: Saint-Romain-de-Colbosc
- Intercommunality: Le Havre Seine Métropole

Government
  - Mayor (2026–32): Yann Adreit
- Area^{1}: 7.39 km^{2} (2.85 sq mi)
- Elevation: 124 m (407 ft)
- Highest elevation: 134 m (440 ft)
- Lowest elevation: 108 m (354 ft)
- Population (2023): 748
  - Density: 101/km^{2} (262/sq mi)
- Time zone: UTC+01:00 (CET)
  - Summer (DST): UTC+02:00 (CEST)
- INSEE/Postal code: 76303 /76430
- ^{1} French Land Register data, which excludes lakes, ponds, glaciers > 1 km^{2} (0.386 sq mi or 247 acres) and river estuaries.

Gommerville (French pronunciation: [ɡɔmɛʁvil]) is a commune in the Seine-Maritime department in the Normandy region in northern France.

== Geography ==
A farming village situated in the Pays de Caux, some 11 miles (18 km) northeast of Le Havre, at the junction of the D80 and D31 roads. Junction 6 of the A29 autoroute is within the boundary of the commune.

== Heraldry ==
Arms of Gommerville	The arms of Gommerville are blazoned : Or, a tower gules opened and pierced of the field, on a chief azure, a dove descending between the capital letters G and V argent.

== Population ==
Historical population
Year	Pop.	±% p.a.
1968	522	—
1975	540	+0.49%
1982	602	+1.56%
1990	604	+0.04%
1999	648	+0.78%
2007	700	+0.97%
2012	702	+0.06%
2017	738	+1.01%
2023	748	+0.22%
Source: INSEE

== Places of interest ==
- The church of St.Martin, dating from the twelfth century.
- The remains of a feudal chateau.
- The Château de Filières (in French), open to the public.
- The chateau Joly.
- A sixteenth century manorhouse at Rebomare.

== See also ==
- Communes of the Seine-Maritime department
