= Vérigny =

Commune in Eure-et-Loir, France

- Part of Mittainvilliers-Vérigny
- Location of Vérigny
- Location within France Location within Centre-Val de Loire
- Coordinates: 48°31′16″N 1°19′23″E
- Country: France
- Region: Centre-Val de Loire
- Department: Eure-et-Loir
- Arrondissement: Chartres
- Canton: Illiers-Combray
- Commune: Mittainvilliers-Vérigny
- Area^{1}: 13.04 km^{2} (5.03 sq mi)
- Elevation: 247 m (810 ft)
- Highest elevation: 236 m (774 ft)
- Lowest elevation: 177 m (581 ft)
- Population (2013): 302
  - Density: 23.2/km^{2} (60.0/sq mi)
- Time zone: UTC+01:00 (CET)
  - Summer (DST): UTC+02:00 (CEST)
- Postal code: 28190
- ^{1} French Land Register data, which excludes lakes, ponds, glaciers > 1 km^{2} (0.386 sq mi or 247 acres) and river estuaries.

Vérigny (French pronunciation: [veʁiɲi]) is a former commune in the Eure-et-Loir department in northern France. On 1 January 2016, it was merged into the new commune of Mittainvilliers-Vérigny.

== See also ==
- Communes of the Eure-et-Loir department
