= Château de Montoire =

Ruined castle in Montoire-sur-le-Loire, France

Coordinates: 47.7500°N 0.8572°E

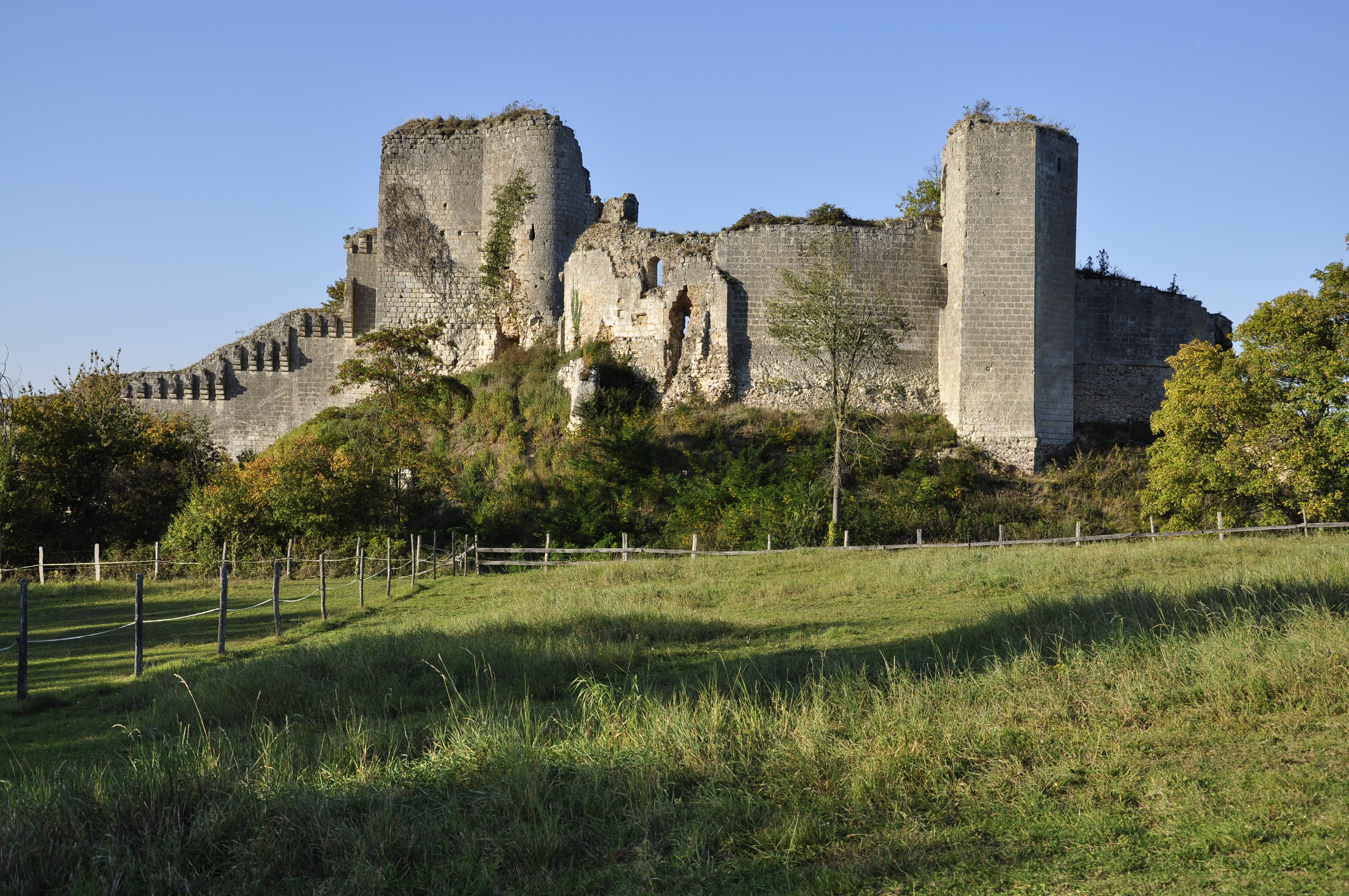
Ruins of Château de Montoire

The Château de Montoire is a ruined castle in the commune of Montoire-sur-le-Loir in the Loir-et-Cher department of France.

Construction began in the 11th century; there were further building works in the 12th, 13th and 14th centuries.

The castle is the property of the commune and is open to the public. It has been listed since 1862 as a monument historique by the French Ministry of Culture.

== See also ==
- List of castles in France
