= Le Thieulin =

- Commune
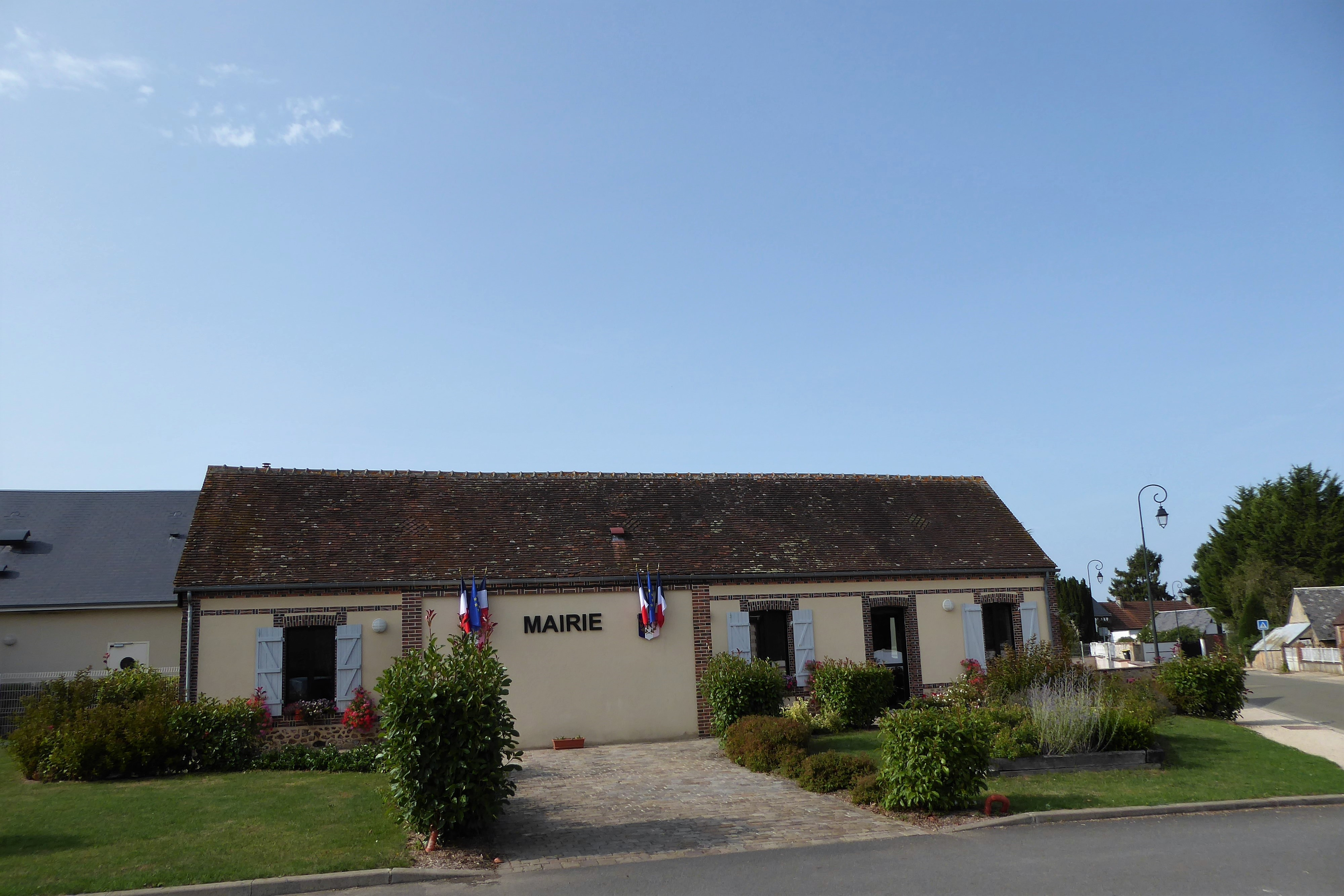
- The town hall in Le Thieulin
- Location of Le Thieulin
- Location within France Location within Centre-Val de Loire
- Coordinates: 48°24′30″N 1°08′03″E
- Country: France
- Region: Centre-Val de Loire
- Department: Eure-et-Loir
- Arrondissement: Nogent-le-Rotrou
- Canton: Illiers-Combray

Government
  - Mayor (2020–2026): Philippe Schmit
- Area^{1}: 11.71 km^{2} (4.52 sq mi)
- Elevation: 238 m (781 ft)
- Highest elevation: 257 m (843 ft)
- Lowest elevation: 191 m (627 ft)
- Population (2023): 423
  - Density: 36.1/km^{2} (93.6/sq mi)
- Time zone: UTC+01:00 (CET)
  - Summer (DST): UTC+02:00 (CEST)
- INSEE/Postal code: 28385 /28240
- ^{1} French Land Register data, which excludes lakes, ponds, glaciers > 1 km^{2} (0.386 sq mi or 247 acres) and river estuaries.

Le Thieulin (French pronunciation: [lə tjœlɛ̃]) is a commune in the Eure-et-Loir department in northern France.

== Geography ==
The Commune along with another 70 communes shares part of a 47,681 hectare, Natura 2000 conservation area, called the Forêts et étangs du Perche.

== Population ==
Historical population
| Year | Pop. | ±% p.a. |
|---|---|---|
| 1968 | 213 | — |
| 1975 | 217 | +0.27% |
| 1982 | 239 | +1.39% |
| 1990 | 293 | +2.58% |
| 1999 | 329 | +1.30% |
| 2007 | 395 | +2.31% |
| 2012 | 424 | +1.43% |
| 2017 | 452 | +1.29% |
| 2023 | 423 | −1.10% |
Source: INSEE

== See also ==
- Communes of the Eure-et-Loir department
