= Germignonville =

- Part of Éole-en-Beauce
- Location of Germignonville
- Location within France Location within Centre-Val de Loire
- Coordinates: 48°11′36″N 1°44′13″E
- Country: France
- Region: Centre-Val de Loire
- Department: Eure-et-Loir
- Arrondissement: Chartres
- Canton: Voves
- Commune: Éole-en-Beauce
- Area^{1}: 20.92 km^{2} (8.08 sq mi)
- Elevation: 141 m (463 ft)
- Highest elevation: 141 m (463 ft)
- Lowest elevation: 117 m (384 ft)
- Population (2023): 228
  - Density: 10.9/km^{2} (28.2/sq mi)
- Time zone: UTC+01:00 (CET)
  - Summer (DST): UTC+02:00 (CEST)
- Postal code: 28140
- ^{1} French Land Register data, which excludes lakes, ponds, glaciers > 1 km^{2} (0.386 sq mi or 247 acres) and river estuaries.

Germignonville (French pronunciation: [ʒɛʁmiɲɔ̃vil]) is a former commune in the Eure-et-Loir department in northern France. On 1 January 2016, it was merged into the new commune of Éole-en-Beauce.

== See also ==
- Communes of the Eure-et-Loir department
