= Orlu, Eure-et-Loir =

Orlu
- Part of Gommerville
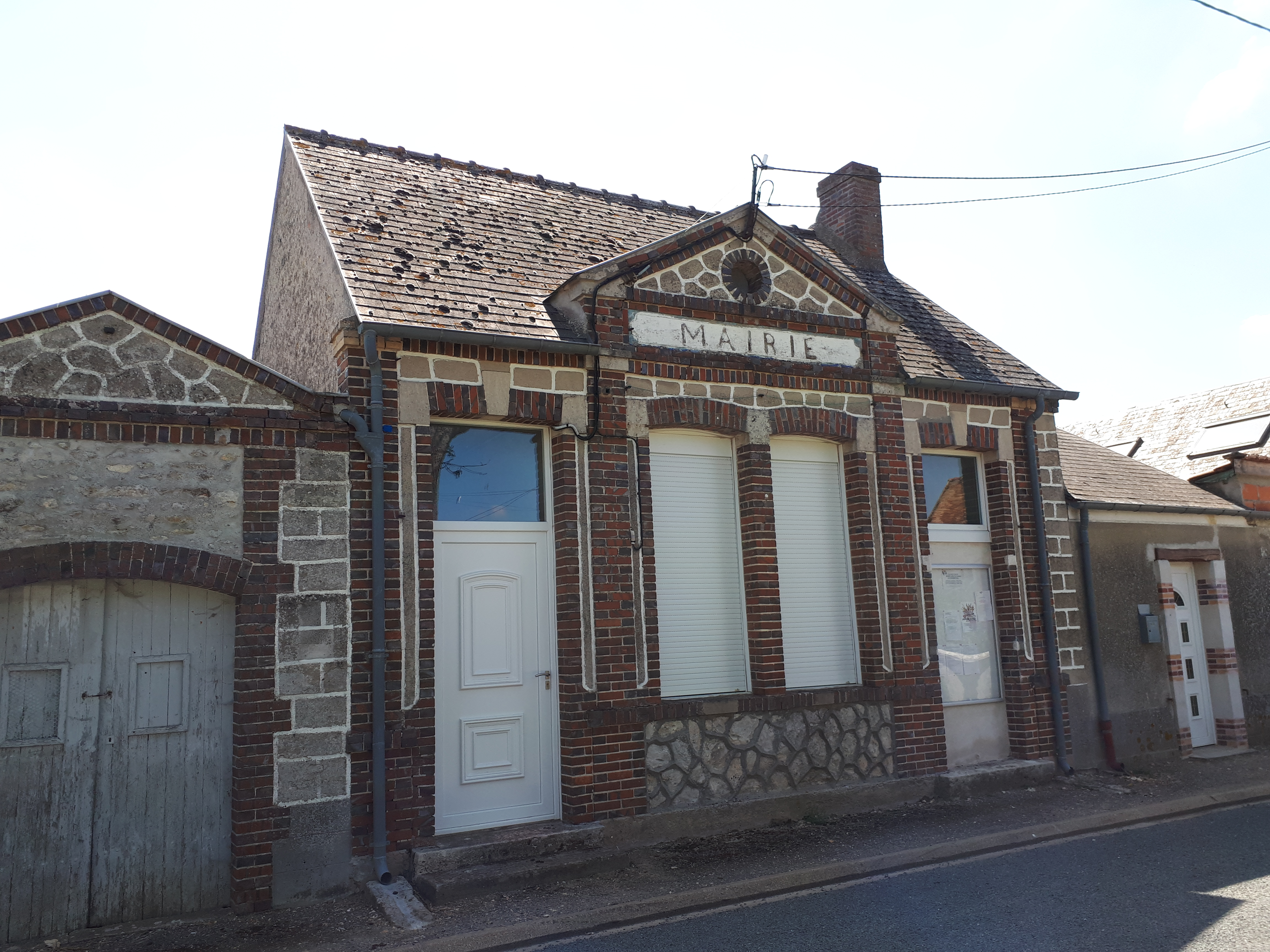
- Town hall
- Location of Orlu
- Location within France Location within Centre-Val de Loire
- Coordinates: 48°22′16″N 1°55′11″E
- Country: France
- Region: Centre-Val de Loire
- Department: Eure-et-Loir
- Arrondissement: Chartres
- Canton: Auneau
- Commune: Gommerville
- Area^{1}: 5.22 km^{2} (2.02 sq mi)
- Elevation: 150 m (490 ft)
- Highest elevation: 151 m (495 ft)
- Lowest elevation: 133 m (436 ft)
- Population (2019): 37
  - Density: 7.1/km^{2} (18/sq mi)
- Time zone: UTC+01:00 (CET)
  - Summer (DST): UTC+02:00 (CEST)
- Postal code: 28700
- ^{1} French Land Register data, which excludes lakes, ponds, glaciers > 1 km^{2} (0.386 sq mi or 247 acres) and river estuaries.

Orlu (French pronunciation: [ɔʁly]) is a former commune in the Eure-et-Loir department in northern France. On 1 January 2016, it was merged into the commune of Gommerville.

== See also ==
- Communes of the Eure-et-Loir department
