= Château de Châteaudun =

Castle in France

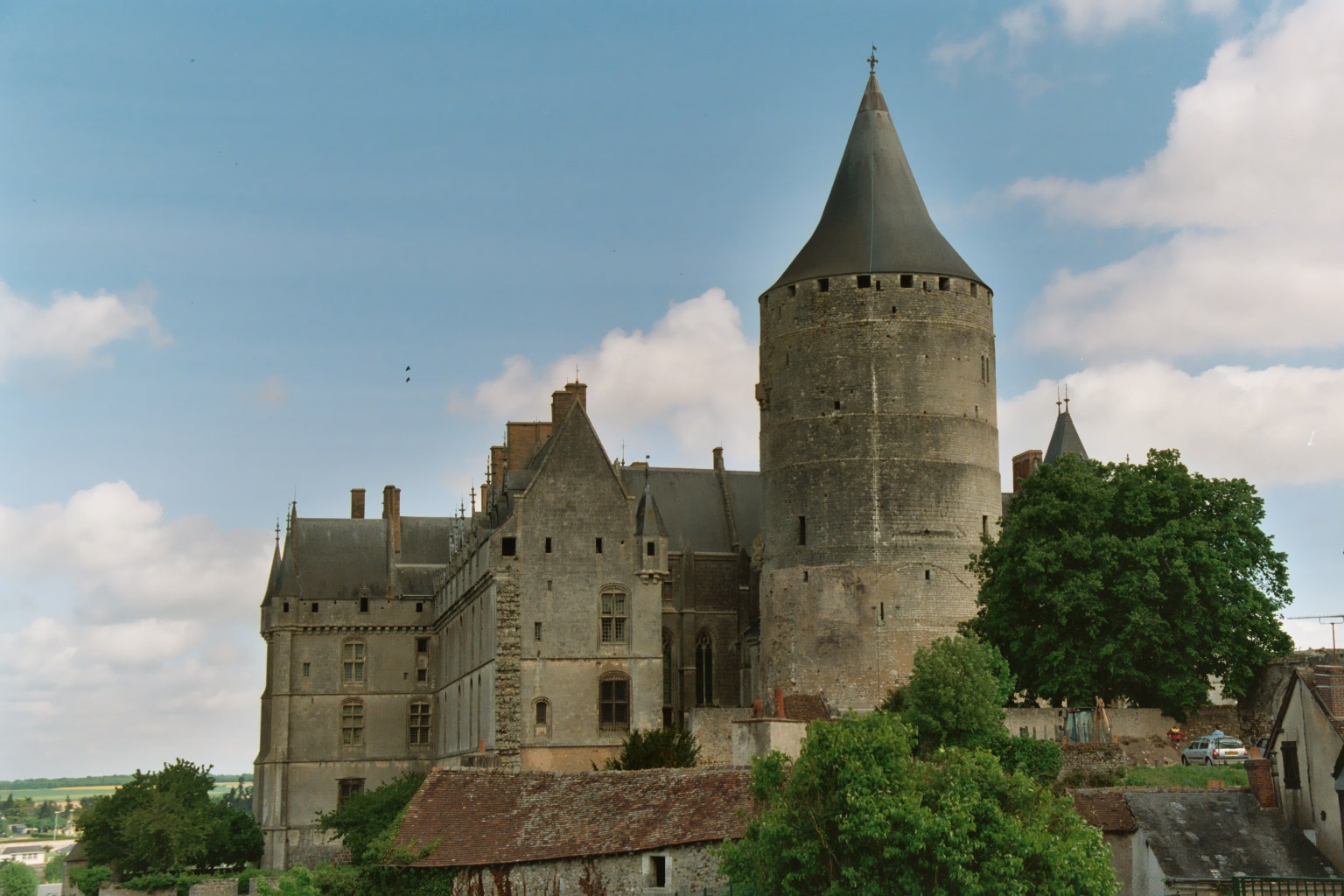
- View from the opposite hill
- Interactive map of the Château de Châteaudun area

General information
- Type: Castle, then château
- Architectural style: Gothic and Renaissance
- Location: Place Jehan de Dunois, Châteaudun, Eure-et-Loir, France
- Coordinates: 48°4′14″N 1°19′25″E
- Construction started: 1171
- Owner: Monuments Nationaux

Height
- Height: 42 metres (138 ft)

Website
- http://www.chateau-chateaudun.fr/en/

Monument historique
- Designated: 6 July 1918
- Reference no.: PA00097021

The Château de Châteaudun is a castle located in the town of Châteaudun in the French department of Eure-et-Loir.

== History ==
The castle was built between the 12th and 16th centuries.

The Count of Blois Thibaut V had the keep built around 1170. The Sainte-Chapelle was built between 1451 and 1493. The choir and the high chapel were built between 1451 and 1454, with the nave and the oratory between 1460 and 1464.

Together with the Château de Montsoreau (1453) and the Palais Jacques-Cœur (1451), Châteaudun's 15th-century additions are among the earliest examples of residences built essentially for leisure in France.

Jehan de Dunois, the bâtard d'Orléans (Bastard of Orléans), built the west wing (the "aile Dunois") between 1459 and 1468.

The bell tower was erected in 1493.

François I of Orléans-Longueville began construction of the north wing (the "aile Longueville") between 1469 and 1491. The upper floors were added by François II d'Orléans-Longueville and his descendants during the first quarter of the 16th century.

A ceremony involving minstrels was held at the castle to mark the betrothal and proxy wedding of James V, King of Scotland, and Mary of Guise on 9 May 1538. The King's proxy Lord Maxwell gave the bride a diamond "spousing ring" which cost 300 French crowns.

== Today ==
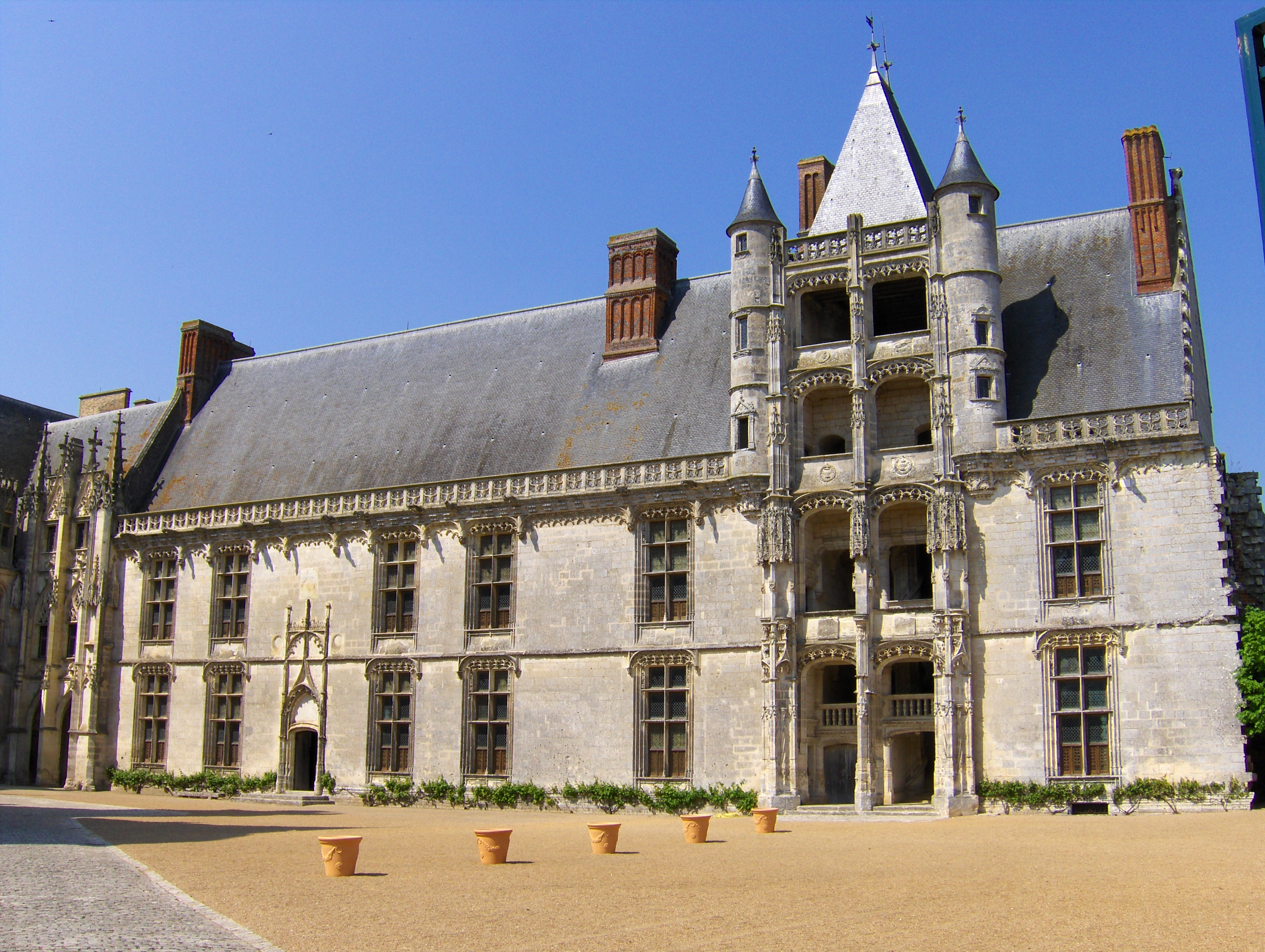
The Longueville wing of the château

The castle includes:

- a keep from the 12th century, 31 metres (102 ft) high (wall), 42 metres (138 ft) high (entire height), 17 metres (56 ft) in diameter
- a chapel from the 15th century (one of the seven remaining Sainte Chapelle kind of chapels in France)
- the Dunois wing from the 15th century
- the Longueville wing from the end of the 15th century

The château overlooks the Loir River. Perched on a limestone outcrop, it shows its origins as a 12th-century fortress. Converted by Jean de Dunois during the early Renaissance into a comfortable residence, the main body of the building is roofed in the gothic style. It still has, notably, a finely carved staircase from this period.

Renovated since the 1930s, the castle has been designated as a monument historique (historic monument) since 1918.

== See also ==
- List of châteaux in Eure-et-Loir
- List of castles in France
