= Pontgouin =

- Commune
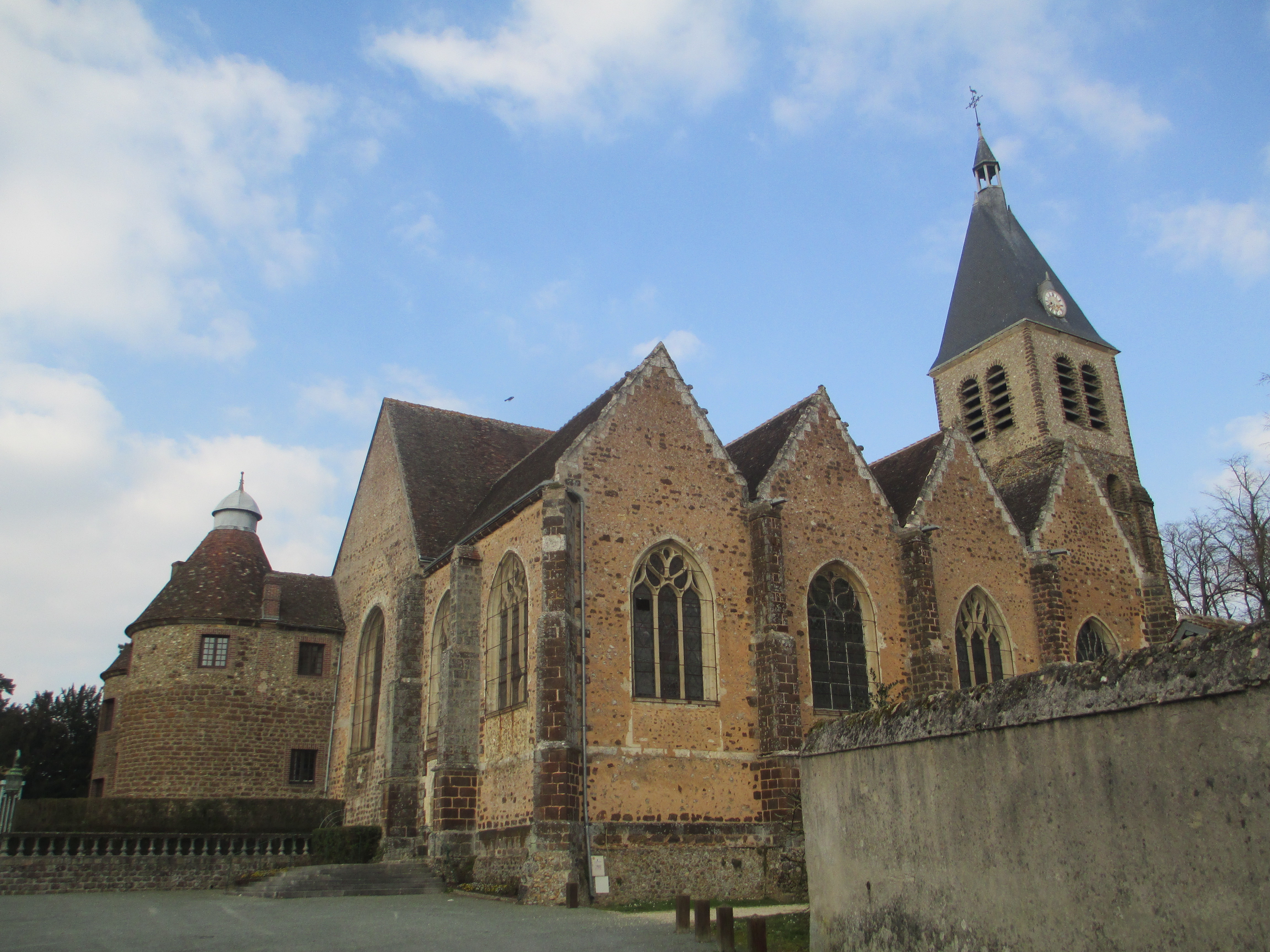
- The church in Pontgouin

- Coat of arms
- Location of Pontgouin
- Location within France Location within Centre-Val de Loire
- Coordinates: 48°28′52″N 1°09′43″E
- Country: France
- Region: Centre-Val de Loire
- Department: Eure-et-Loir
- Arrondissement: Chartres
- Canton: Illiers-Combray
- Intercommunality: Entre Beauce et Perche

Government
  - Mayor (2020–2026): Jean-Claude Friesse
- Area^{1}: 25.16 km^{2} (9.71 sq mi)
- Elevation: 192 m (630 ft)
- Highest elevation: 273 m (896 ft)
- Lowest elevation: 173 m (568 ft)
- Population (2023): 1,110
  - Density: 44.1/km^{2} (114/sq mi)
- Time zone: UTC+01:00 (CET)
  - Summer (DST): UTC+02:00 (CEST)
- INSEE/Postal code: 28302 /28190
- ^{1} French Land Register data, which excludes lakes, ponds, glaciers > 1 km^{2} (0.386 sq mi or 247 acres) and river estuaries.

Pontgouin (French pronunciation: [pɔ̃ɡwɛ̃]) is a commune in the Eure-et-Loir department in northern France.

== Geography ==
The Commune along with another 70 communes shares part of a 47,681 hectare, Natura 2000 conservation area, called the Forêts et étangs du Perche.

== Population ==
Historical population
Year	Pop.	±% p.a.
1968	936	—
1975	1,389	+5.80%
1982	833	−7.04%
1990	854	+0.31%
1999	875	+0.27%
2007	1,005	+1.75%
2012	1,109	+1.99%
2017	1,096	−0.24%
2023	1,110	+0.21%
Source: INSEE

== See also ==
- Communes of the Eure-et-Loir department
