= Château du Grand-Besse =

Castle in Centre-Val de Loire, France

Coordinates: 46°34′14″N 2°16′18″E

The Château du Grand-Besse is a castle in the commune of Saint-Maur in the Cher département of France.

== Architecture ==
The present castle consists of a very robust square keep, lit by mullioned windows. This keep from the early 15th century dates the construction, or reconstruction, of the castle. Of the surrounding walls, the only remains are a round tower and stretch of wall and part of a moat still filled with water. Also from the same era are a round staircase tower with small square windows and, in the south east, a doorway opening into the courtyard whose lintel is decorated with an escutcheon.

The new residence dates from the 17th century and was enlarged in the 19th with the addition of a neo-Gothic staircase tower. The residential building is of rectangular plan, with a staircase tower in the centre. A small brick "pepperpot" (not accessible) is in one corner. The roof is crowned with metal spikes.

The farm buildings are decorated with alternate layers of brick and stone.

Château du Grand-Besse is listed as a monument historique by the French Ministry of Culture.

== See also ==
- List of castles in France
