= Bailleau-l'Évêque =

- Commune
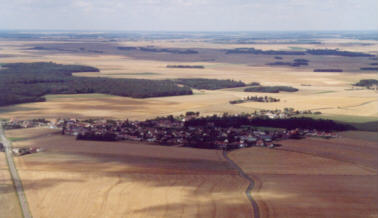
- A general view of Bailleau-l'Évêque

- Coat of arms
- Location of Bailleau-l'Évêque
- Location within France Location within Centre-Val de Loire
- Coordinates: 48°29′22″N 1°23′51″E
- Country: France
- Region: Centre-Val de Loire
- Department: Eure-et-Loir
- Arrondissement: Chartres
- Canton: Chartres-3
- Intercommunality: CA Chartres Métropole

Government
  - Mayor (2020–2026): Philippe Barazzutti
- Area^{1}: 19.68 km^{2} (7.60 sq mi)
- Elevation: 159 m (522 ft)
- Highest elevation: 216 m (709 ft)
- Lowest elevation: 142 m (466 ft)
- Population (2023): 1,175
  - Density: 59.71/km^{2} (154.6/sq mi)
- Time zone: UTC+01:00 (CET)
  - Summer (DST): UTC+02:00 (CEST)
- INSEE/Postal code: 28022 /28300
- ^{1} French Land Register data, which excludes lakes, ponds, glaciers > 1 km^{2} (0.386 sq mi or 247 acres) and river estuaries.

Bailleau-l'Évêque (French pronunciation: [bajo levɛk]) is a commune in the Eure-et-Loir department in northern France.

== Population ==
Historical population
Year	Pop.	±% p.a.
1968	545	—
1975	588	+1.09%
1982	682	+2.14%
1990	929	+3.94%
1999	987	+0.68%
2007	1,135	+1.76%
2012	1,182	+0.81%
2017	1,162	−0.34%
2023	1,175	+0.19%
Source: INSEE

== Sights ==
Bois de Bailleau-l'Évêque (fauna and flora), the Château de Levesville (end of 15th century), the Château de Bailleau (a 12th-century church), several traditional farms in the Beauce region, and the remains of the Louis XIV canal, still in water and preserved.

== See also ==
- Communes of the Eure-et-Loir department
