= Gommerville, Eure-et-Loir =

Gommerville
- Commune
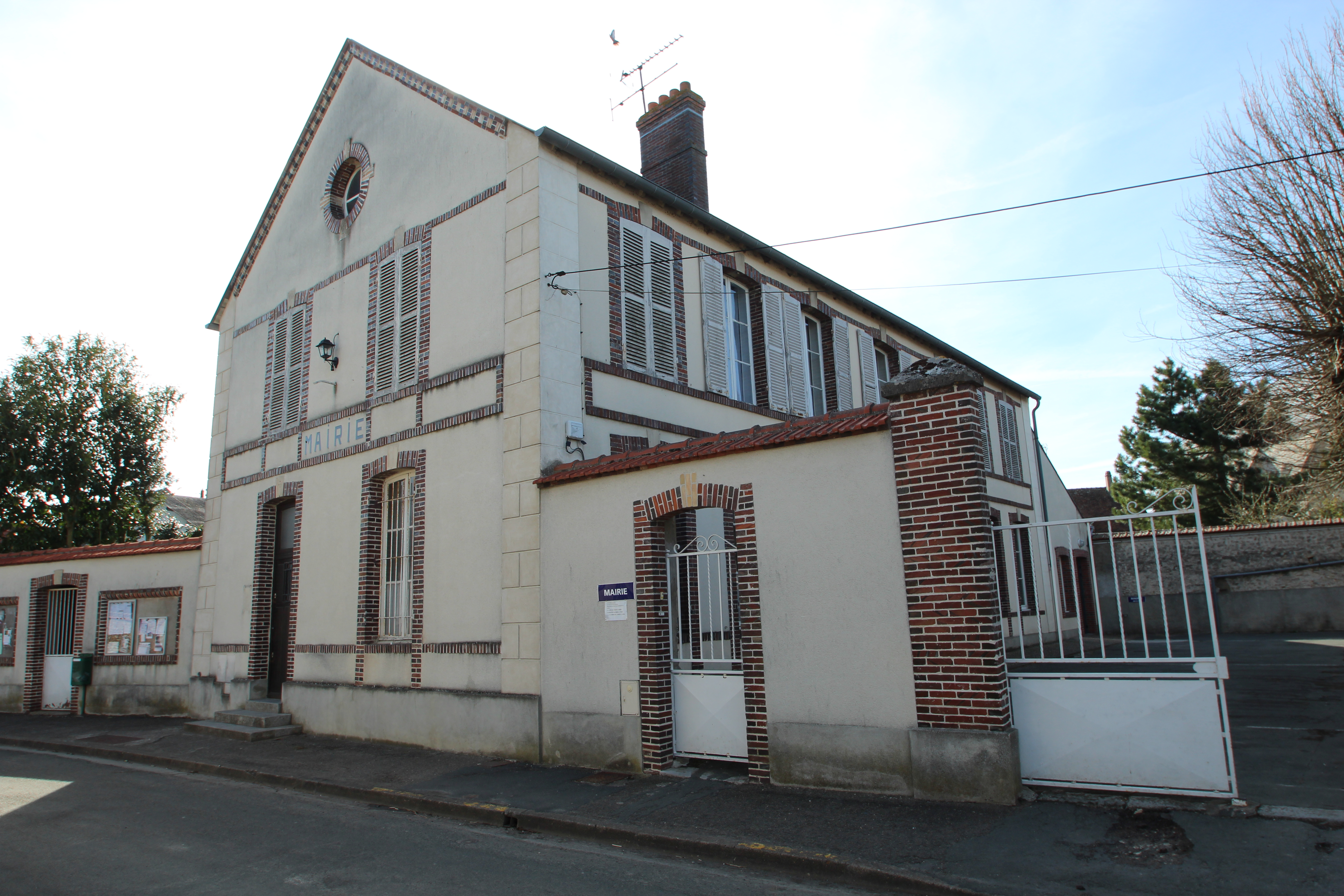
- The town hall in Gommerville
- Location of Gommerville
- Location within France Location within Centre-Val de Loire
- Coordinates: 48°20′46″N 1°56′44″E
- Country: France
- Region: Centre-Val de Loire
- Department: Eure-et-Loir
- Arrondissement: Chartres
- Canton: Les Villages Vovéens
- Intercommunality: Cœur de Beauce

Government
  - Mayor (2020–2026): Yolande Letort
- Area^{1}: 32.45 km^{2} (12.53 sq mi)
- Elevation: 135 m (443 ft)
- Highest elevation: 151 m (495 ft)
- Lowest elevation: 123 m (404 ft)
- Population (2023): 663
  - Density: 20.4/km^{2} (52.9/sq mi)
- Time zone: UTC+01:00 (CET)
  - Summer (DST): UTC+02:00 (CEST)
- INSEE/Postal code: 28183 /28310
- ^{1} French Land Register data, which excludes lakes, ponds, glaciers > 1 km^{2} (0.386 sq mi or 247 acres) and river estuaries.

Gommerville (French pronunciation: [ɡɔmɛʁvil]) is a commune in the Eure-et-Loir department in northern France. In 1973 it absorbed the former commune Grandville-Gaudreville. On 1 January 2016, the former commune of Orlu was merged into Gommerville.

== Population ==
Historical population
Year	Pop.	±% p.a.
1968	538	—
1975	488	−1.38%
1982	454	−1.03%
1990	489	+0.93%
1999	504	+0.34%
2007	622	+2.66%
2012	666	+1.38%
2017	685	+0.56%
2023	663	−0.54%
Source: INSEE

== See also ==
- Communes of the Eure-et-Loir department
