= Crucey-Villages =

- Commune
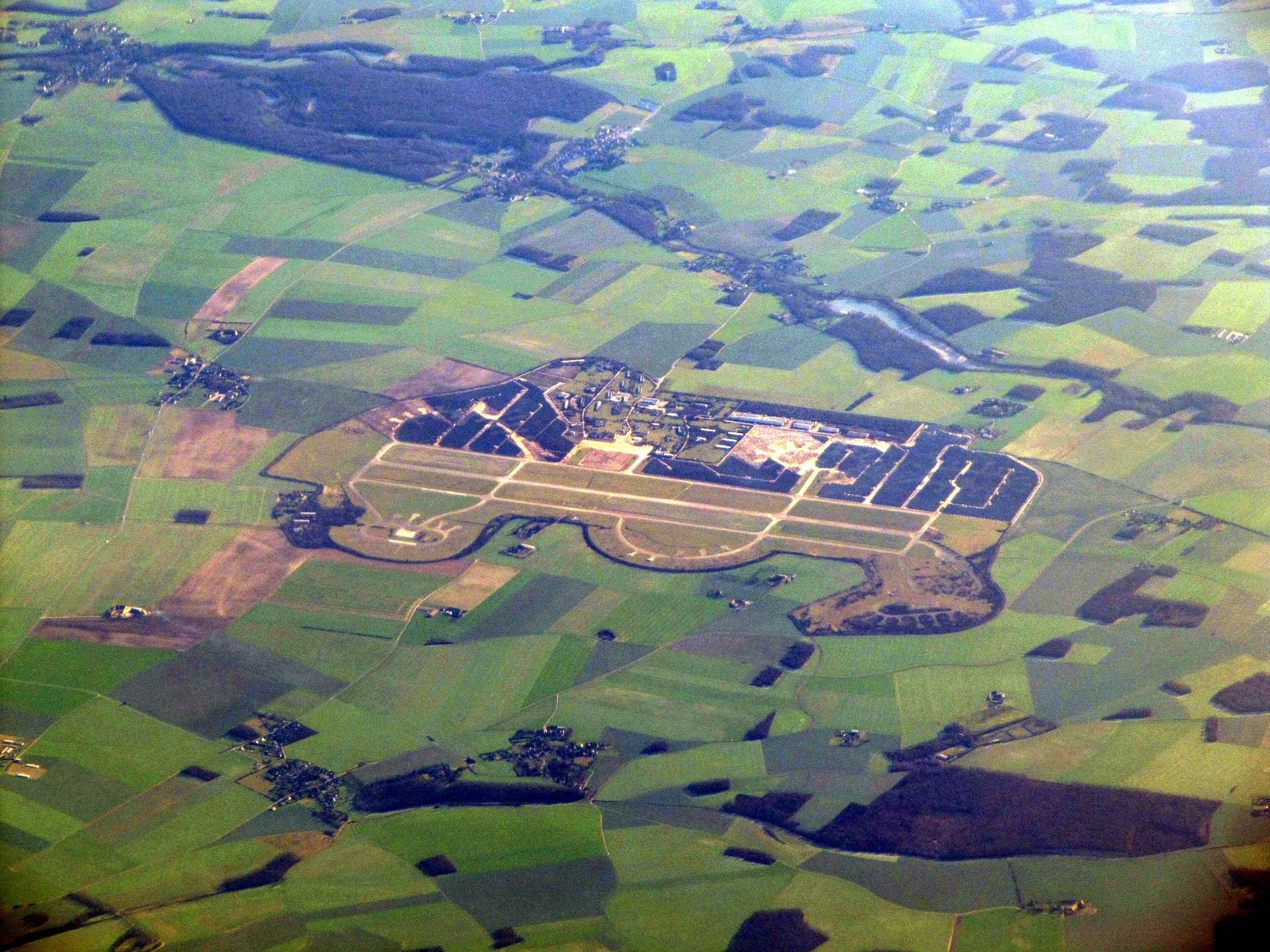
- An aerial view of Dreux-Louvilliers Air Base
- Location of Crucey-Villages
- Location within France Location within Centre-Val de Loire
- Coordinates: 48°40′02″N 1°04′40″E
- Country: France
- Region: Centre-Val de Loire
- Department: Eure-et-Loir
- Arrondissement: Dreux
- Canton: Saint-Lubin-des-Joncherets
- Intercommunality: CA Pays de Dreux

Government
  - Mayor (2020–2026): Jean-Claude Lamour
- Area^{1}: 43.97 km^{2} (16.98 sq mi)
- Elevation: 172 m (564 ft)
- Highest elevation: 195 m (640 ft)
- Lowest elevation: 154 m (505 ft)
- Population (2023): 463
  - Density: 10.5/km^{2} (27.3/sq mi)
- Time zone: UTC+01:00 (CET)
  - Summer (DST): UTC+02:00 (CEST)
- INSEE/Postal code: 28120 /28270
- ^{1} French Land Register data, which excludes lakes, ponds, glaciers > 1 km^{2} (0.386 sq mi or 247 acres) and river estuaries.

Crucey-Villages (French pronunciation: [kʁysɛ vilaʒ]) is a commune in the Eure-et-Loir department and Centre-Val de Loire region of north-central France. It lies 38 km north-west of Chartres and some 95 km west-south-west of Paris. It was created in 1972 by the merger of three former communes: Crucey, Mainterne and Vitray-sous-Brézolles.

== Population ==
Historical population
Year	Pop.	±% p.a.
1968	509	—
1975	410	−3.04%
1982	377	−1.19%
1990	440	+1.95%
1999	460	+0.50%
2007	512	+1.35%
2012	467	−1.82%
2017	468	+0.04%
2023	463	−0.18%
Source: INSEE

== See also ==
- Communes of the Eure-et-Loir department
