= Morte (river) =

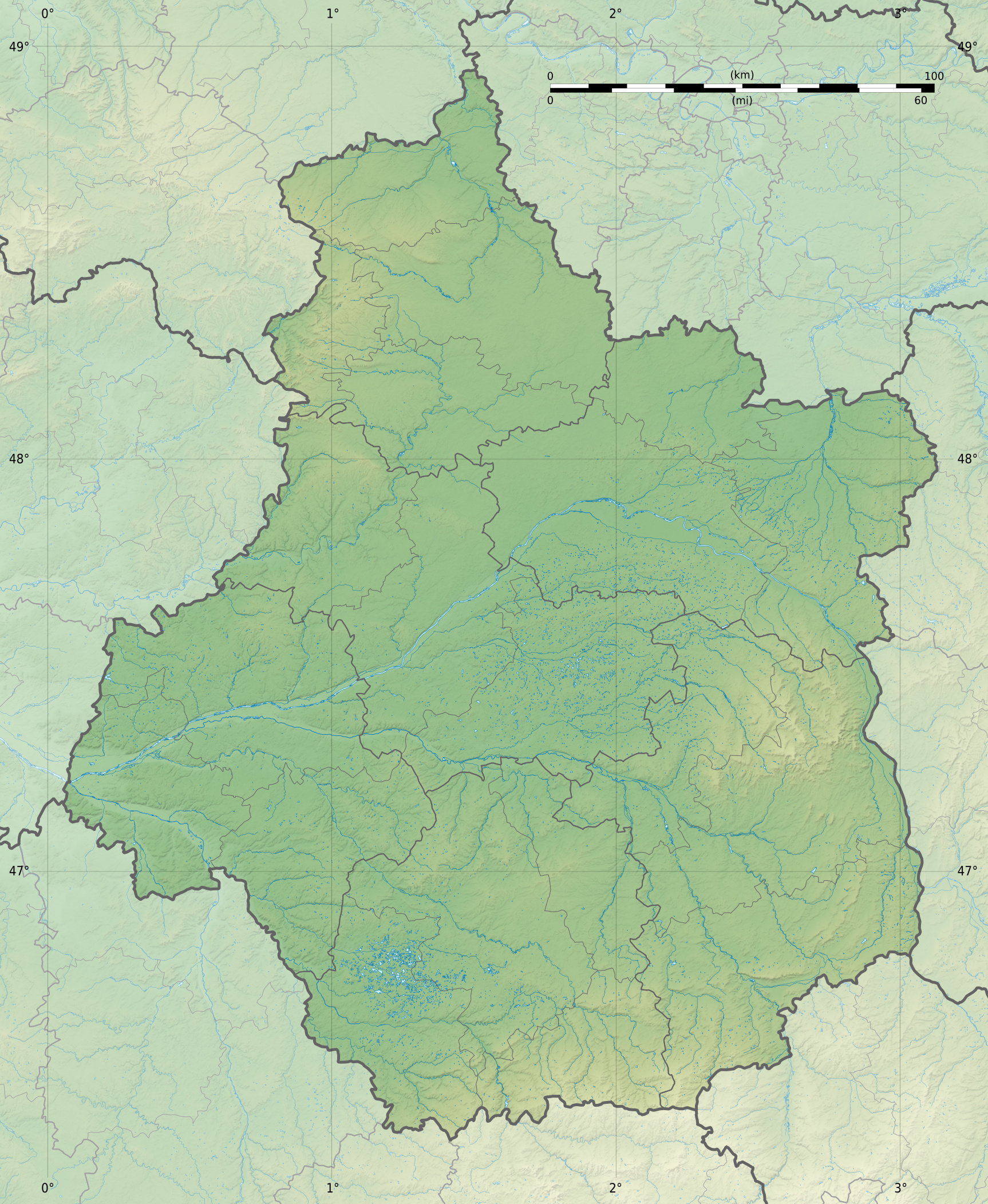
- Location within France Location within Centre-Val de Loire

Location
- Country: France

Physical characteristics
- Mouth: Voise
  - coordinates: 48°33′57″N 1°36′30″E
- Length: 9.8 km (6.1 mi)

Basin features
- Progression: Voise→ Eure→ Seine→ English Channel

The Morte is a river of Eure-et-Loir, a branch of the Voise. To the point where it rejoins the Voise, the Morte runs 9.8 km through 6 communes, from upstream to downstream Ymeray, Gallardon, Bailleau-Armenonville, Yermenonville, Gas and Houx.
