= Cochon =

Cochon is a French word that may refer to:

- Domestic pig
- Piglet (animal)
- Cochon, a restaurant in New Orleans; see Cajun cuisine
- Slang meaning dirty pig, swine, contemptible person; see Cultural references to pigs

== People ==
- Albert Auguste Cochon de Lapparent (1839–1908), French geologist
- Charles Cochon de Lapparent (1750–1825), politician of the First French Republic and First French Empire
- Georges Cochon (1879–1959), a tapestry maker, anarchist, and secretary of the Federation of Tenants

== Other ==
- Le Cochon, a 1970 film directed by Jean Eustache and Jean-Michel Barjol

== See also ==
- Cochonnaille
