= Morte =

Morte (Italian and Portuguese for "death") may also refer to:

- Morte (river), France
- La Morte, commune in the Isère department in southeastern France
- La Morte, French novel by Octave Feuillet 1866
- Morte (Planescape), character in Dungeons & Dragons video game
- Luís Boa Morte (1977), Portuguese professional football coach
- Morte Point, Devon

== See also ==
- La morte d'Orfeo (The Death of Orpheus), a 1619 opera by Stefano Landi
- Le Morte d'Arthur (The Death of Arthur), a 1485 book by Thomas Malory
