= Saint-Lucien =

Saint-Lucien may refer to the following places:

- Saint-Lucien, Eure-et-Loir, a commune in the Eure-et-Loir department, France
- Saint-Lucien, Seine-Maritime, a commune in the Seine-Maritime department, France
- Saint-Lucien, Quebec, a municipality in Quebec, Canada
