= Senantes =

Senantes may refer to the following places in France:

- Senantes, Eure-et-Loir, a commune in the Eure-et-Loir department
- Senantes, Oise, a commune in the Oise department
