= Nogent-le-Roi =

- Commune
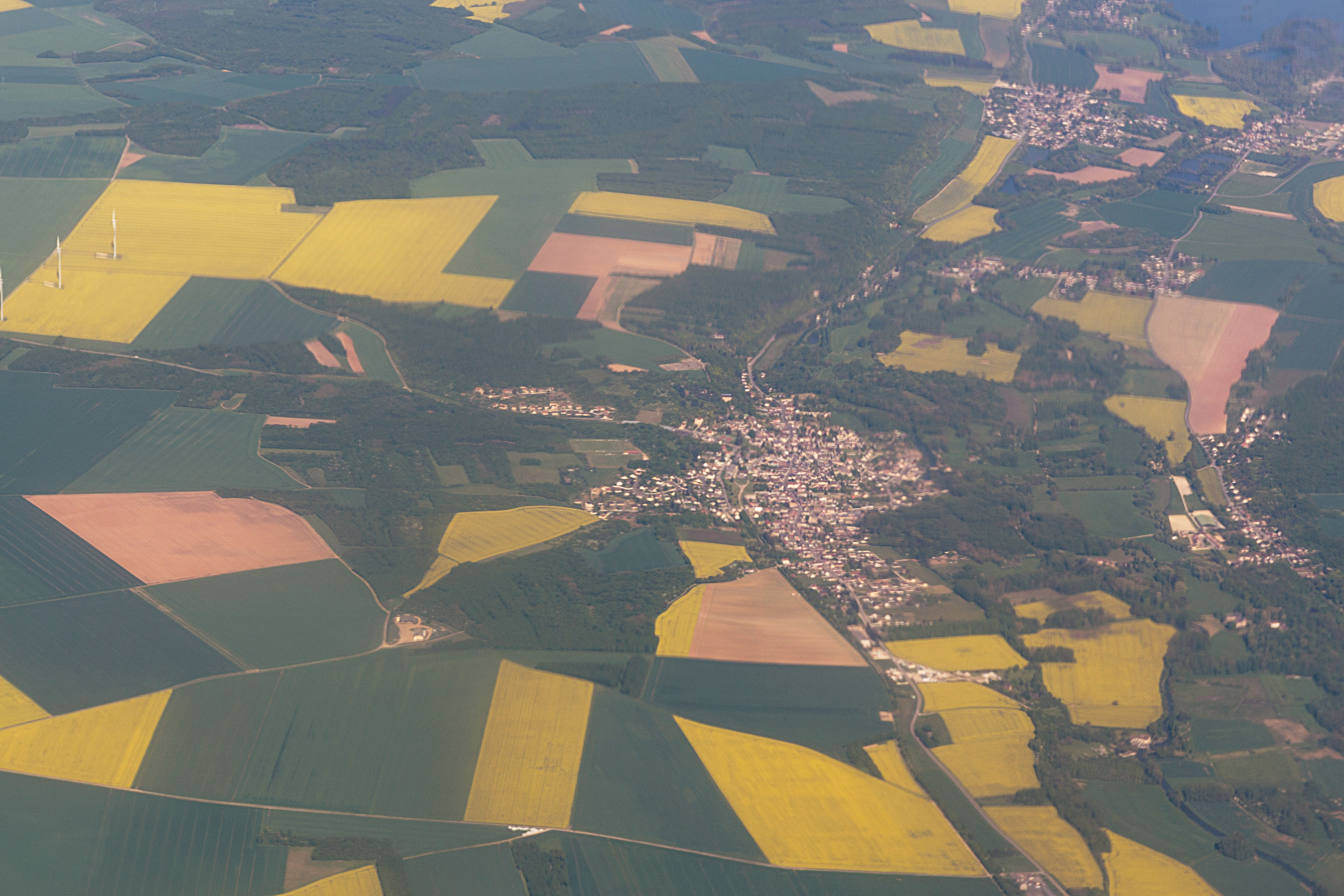
- Aerial view (2018)

- Coat of arms
- Location of Nogent-le-Roi
- Location within France Location within Centre-Val de Loire
- Coordinates: 48°38′58″N 1°31′46″E
- Country: France
- Region: Centre-Val de Loire
- Department: Eure-et-Loir
- Arrondissement: Dreux
- Canton: Épernon
- Intercommunality: Portes Euréliennes d'Île-de-France

Government
  - Mayor (2023–2026): Jean-Loup Vidon
- Area^{1}: 13.01 km^{2} (5.02 sq mi)
- Highest elevation: 138 m (453 ft)
- Lowest elevation: 91 m (299 ft)
- Population (2023): 4,021
  - Density: 309.1/km^{2} (800.5/sq mi)
- Time zone: UTC+01:00 (CET)
  - Summer (DST): UTC+02:00 (CEST)
- INSEE/Postal code: 28279 /28210
- ^{1} French Land Register data, which excludes lakes, ponds, glaciers > 1 km^{2} (0.386 sq mi or 247 acres) and river estuaries.

Nogent-le-Roi (French pronunciation: [nɔʒɑ̃ lə ʁwa]) is a commune in the department of Eure-et-Loir in the Centre-Val de Loire region in France. In January 1973 it absorbed the former commune Vacheresses-les-Basses.

It is located 27 kilometres north of Chartres and 18 kilometres south-east of Dreux.

== Population ==
Population data refer to the commune in its geography as of January 2025.

Historical population
Year	Pop.	±% p.a.
1968	1,876	—
1975	2,527	+4.35%
1982	3,267	+3.74%
1990	3,832	+2.01%
1999	4,142	+0.87%
2007	4,071	−0.22%
2012	4,133	+0.30%
2017	4,084	−0.24%
2023	4,021	−0.26%
Source: INSEE

== International relations ==
The town is twinned with Heddesheim near Mannheim in Germany.

== See also ==
- Communes of the Eure-et-Loir department
