= Soulaires =

- Commune
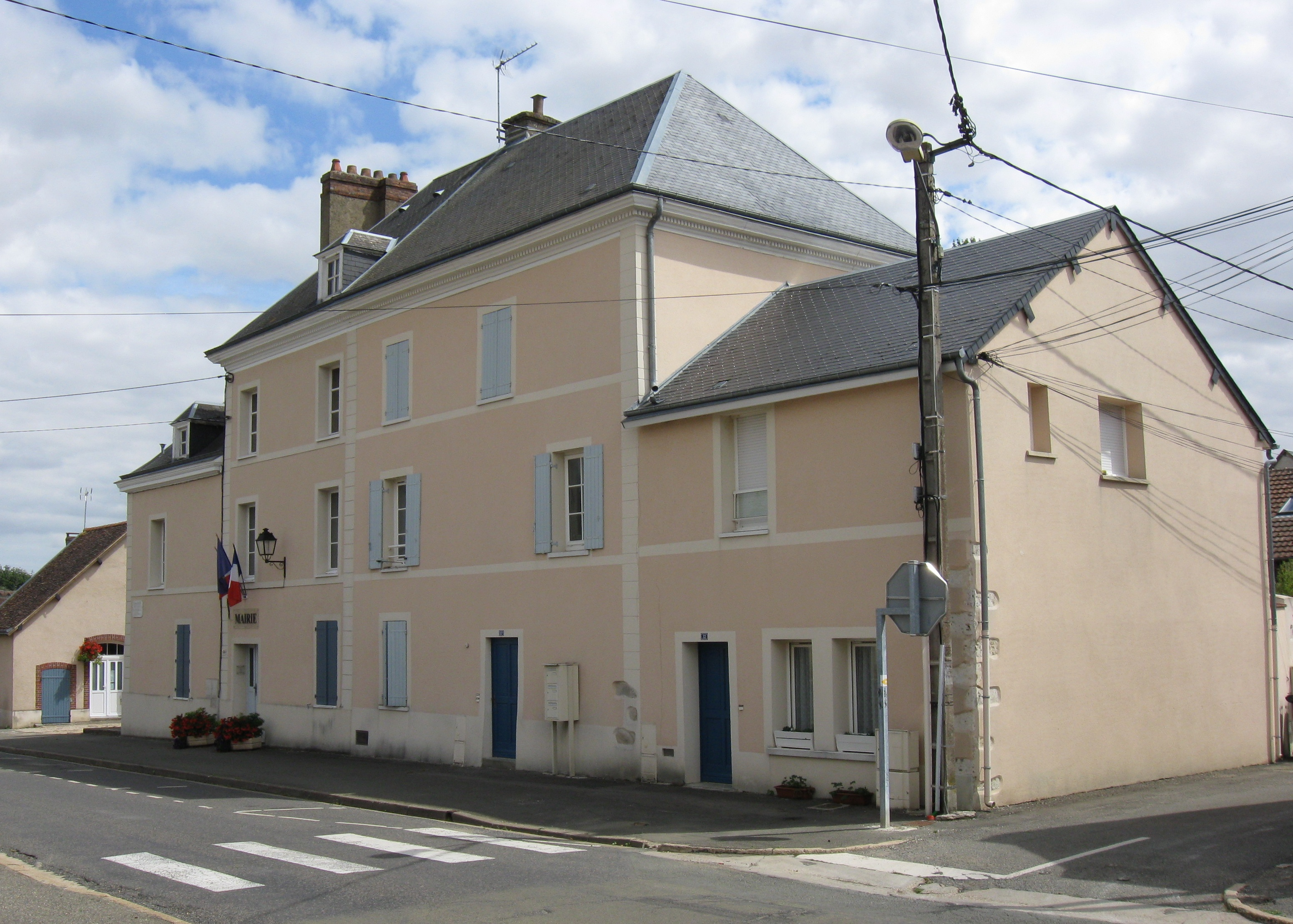
- The town hall in Soulaires
- Location of Soulaires
- Location within France Location within Centre-Val de Loire
- Coordinates: 48°31′03″N 1°35′17″E
- Country: France
- Region: Centre-Val de Loire
- Department: Eure-et-Loir
- Arrondissement: Chartres
- Canton: Épernon

Government
  - Mayor (2020–2026): Marc Molet
- Area^{1}: 5.87 km^{2} (2.27 sq mi)
- Elevation: 148 m (486 ft)
- Highest elevation: 157 m (515 ft)
- Lowest elevation: 106 m (348 ft)
- Population (2023): 471
  - Density: 80.2/km^{2} (208/sq mi)
- Time zone: UTC+01:00 (CET)
  - Summer (DST): UTC+02:00 (CEST)
- INSEE/Postal code: 28379 /28130
- ^{1} French Land Register data, which excludes lakes, ponds, glaciers > 1 km^{2} (0.386 sq mi or 247 acres) and river estuaries.

Soulaires (French pronunciation: [sulɛʁ]) is a commune in the Eure-et-Loir department in northern France.

== Population ==
Historical population
Year	Pop.	±% p.a.
1968	269	—
1975	278	+0.47%
1982	289	+0.56%
1990	433	+5.18%
1999	423	−0.26%
2007	428	+0.15%
2012	442	+0.65%
2017	454	+0.54%
2023	471	+0.61%
Source: INSEE

== See also ==
- Communes of the Eure-et-Loir department
