= Saint-Piat =

- Commune
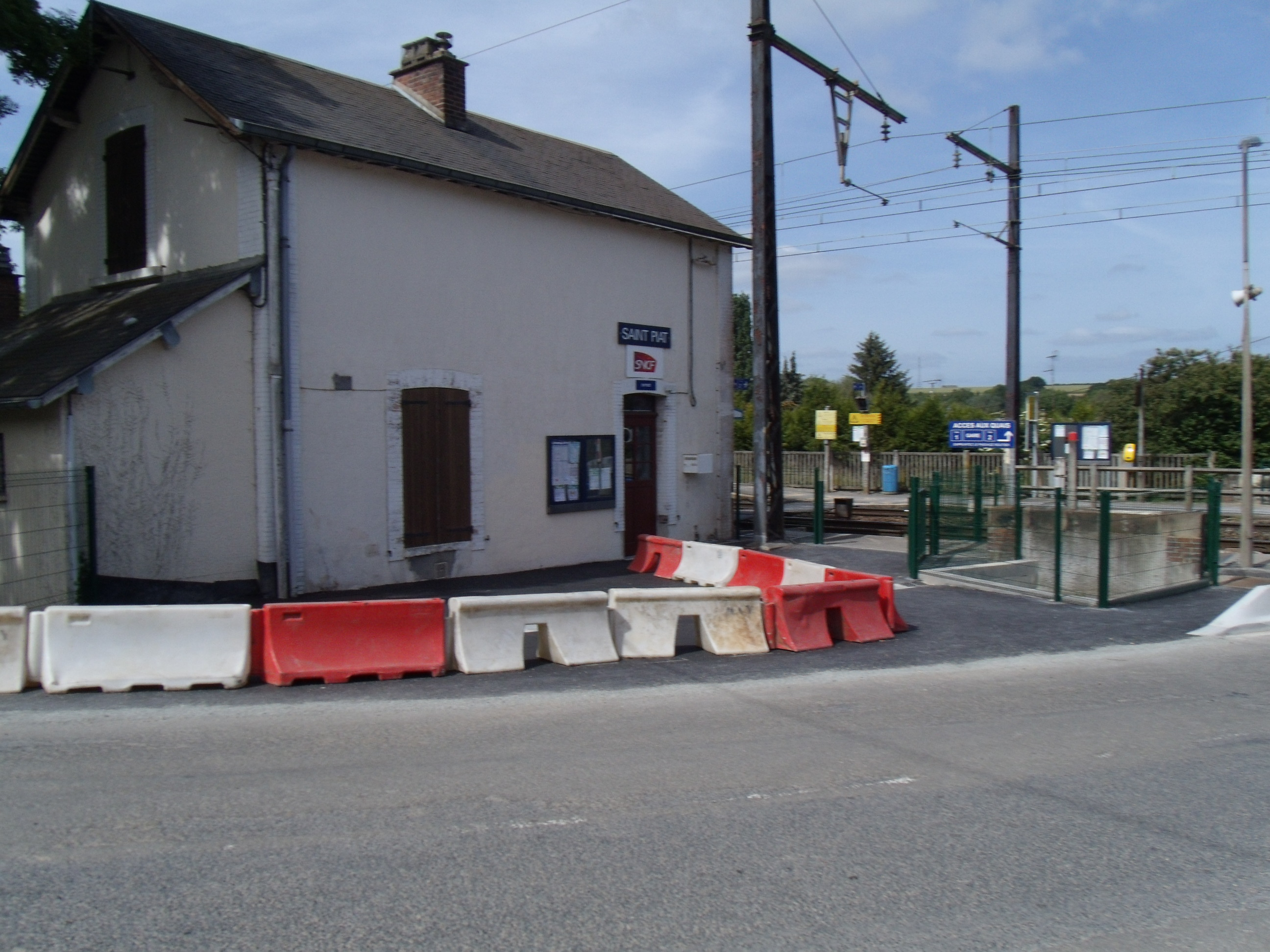
- Train station

- Coat of arms
- Location of Saint-Piat
- Location within France Location within Centre-Val de Loire
- Coordinates: 48°32′55″N 1°35′07″E
- Country: France
- Region: Centre-Val de Loire
- Department: Eure-et-Loir
- Arrondissement: Chartres
- Canton: Épernon
- Intercommunality: Portes Euréliennes d'Île-de-France

Government
  - Mayor (2020–2026): Michael Blanchet
- Area^{1}: 11.29 km^{2} (4.36 sq mi)
- Elevation: 104 m (341 ft)
- Highest elevation: 162 m (531 ft)
- Lowest elevation: 101 m (331 ft)
- Population (2023): 1,120
  - Density: 99.2/km^{2} (257/sq mi)
- Time zone: UTC+01:00 (CET)
  - Summer (DST): UTC+02:00 (CEST)
- INSEE/Postal code: 28357 /28130
- ^{1} French Land Register data, which excludes lakes, ponds, glaciers > 1 km^{2} (0.386 sq mi or 247 acres) and river estuaries.

Saint-Piat (French pronunciation: [sɛ̃ pja]) is a commune in the Eure-et-Loir department in northern France.

== Population ==
Historical population
Year	Pop.	±% p.a.
1968	679	—
1975	832	+2.95%
1982	836	+0.07%
1990	1,009	+2.38%
1999	1,091	+0.87%
2007	1,109	+0.20%
2012	1,115	+0.11%
2017	1,050	−1.19%
2023	1,120	+1.08%
Source: INSEE

== See also ==
- Communes of the Eure-et-Loir department
