= Pierres, Eure-et-Loir =

Pierres
- Commune
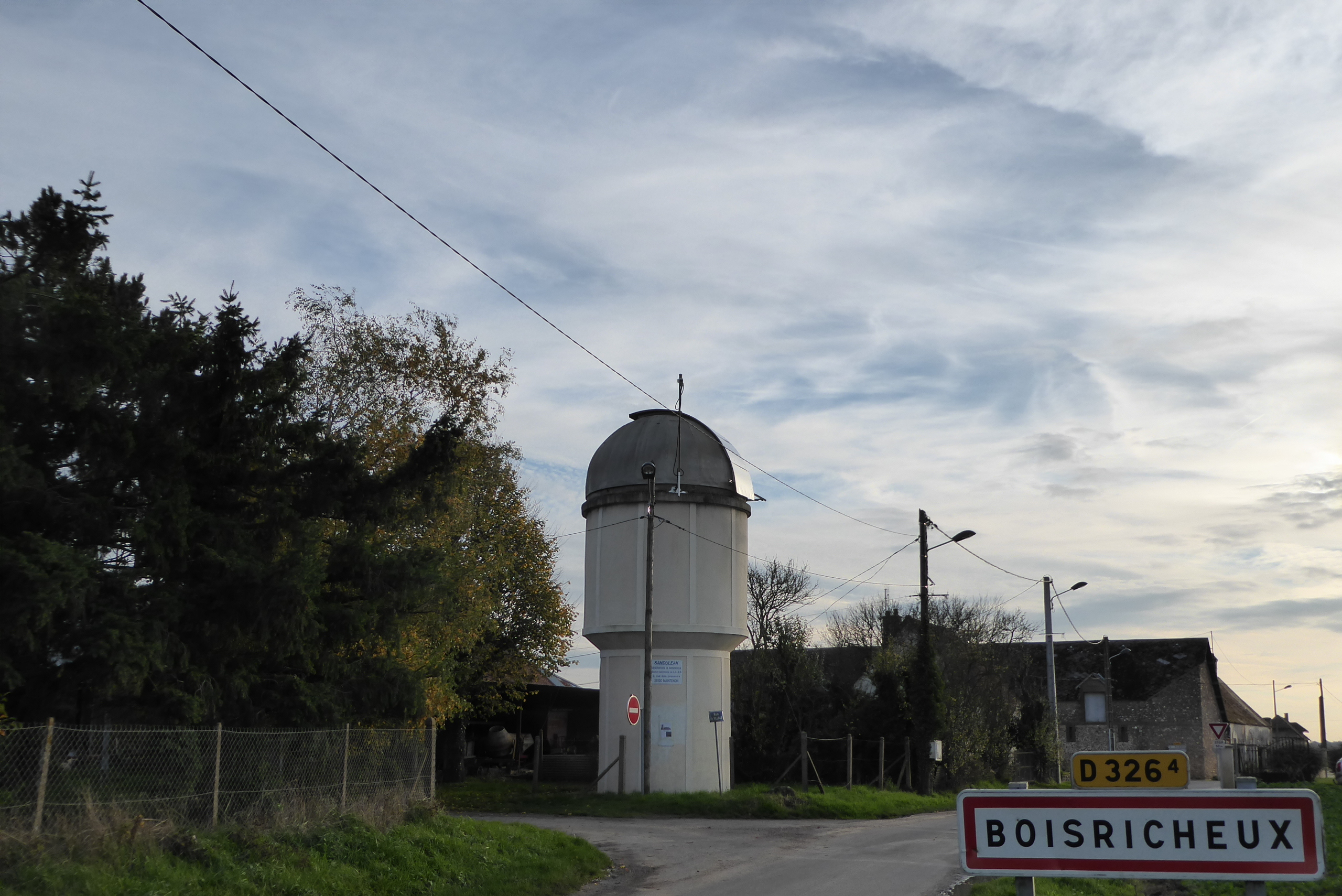
- The Boisricheux Observatory in Pierres
- Location of Pierres
- Location within France Location within Centre-Val de Loire
- Coordinates: 48°35′31″N 1°34′04″E
- Country: France
- Region: Centre-Val de Loire
- Department: Eure-et-Loir
- Arrondissement: Chartres
- Canton: Épernon

Government
  - Mayor (2020–2026): Daniel Morin
- Area^{1}: 10.41 km^{2} (4.02 sq mi)
- Elevation: 102 m (335 ft)
- Highest elevation: 159 m (522 ft)
- Lowest elevation: 95 m (312 ft)
- Population (2023): 2,788
  - Density: 267.8/km^{2} (693.6/sq mi)
- Time zone: UTC+01:00 (CET)
  - Summer (DST): UTC+02:00 (CEST)
- INSEE/Postal code: 28298 /28130
- ^{1} French Land Register data, which excludes lakes, ponds, glaciers > 1 km^{2} (0.386 sq mi or 247 acres) and river estuaries.

Pierres (French pronunciation: [pjɛʁ]) is a commune in the Eure-et-Loir department in northern France.

With the neighbouring commune of Maintenon, they form an urban satellite of Paris of 7,143 inhabitants (2018).

Pierres is an urban commune with 2,788 inhabitants in 2023, having experienced a sharp increase in population since 1968. It is in the urban unit of Maintenon and is part of the Paris area of attraction.

== Population ==
Historical population
Year	Pop.	±% p.a.
1968	853	—
1975	1,301	+6.22%
1982	1,965	+6.07%
1990	2,398	+2.52%
1999	2,691	+1.29%
2007	2,730	+0.18%
2012	2,835	+0.76%
2017	2,783	−0.37%
2023	2,788	+0.03%
Source: INSEE

== See also ==
- Communes of the Eure-et-Loir department
