= Chartainvilliers =

- Commune
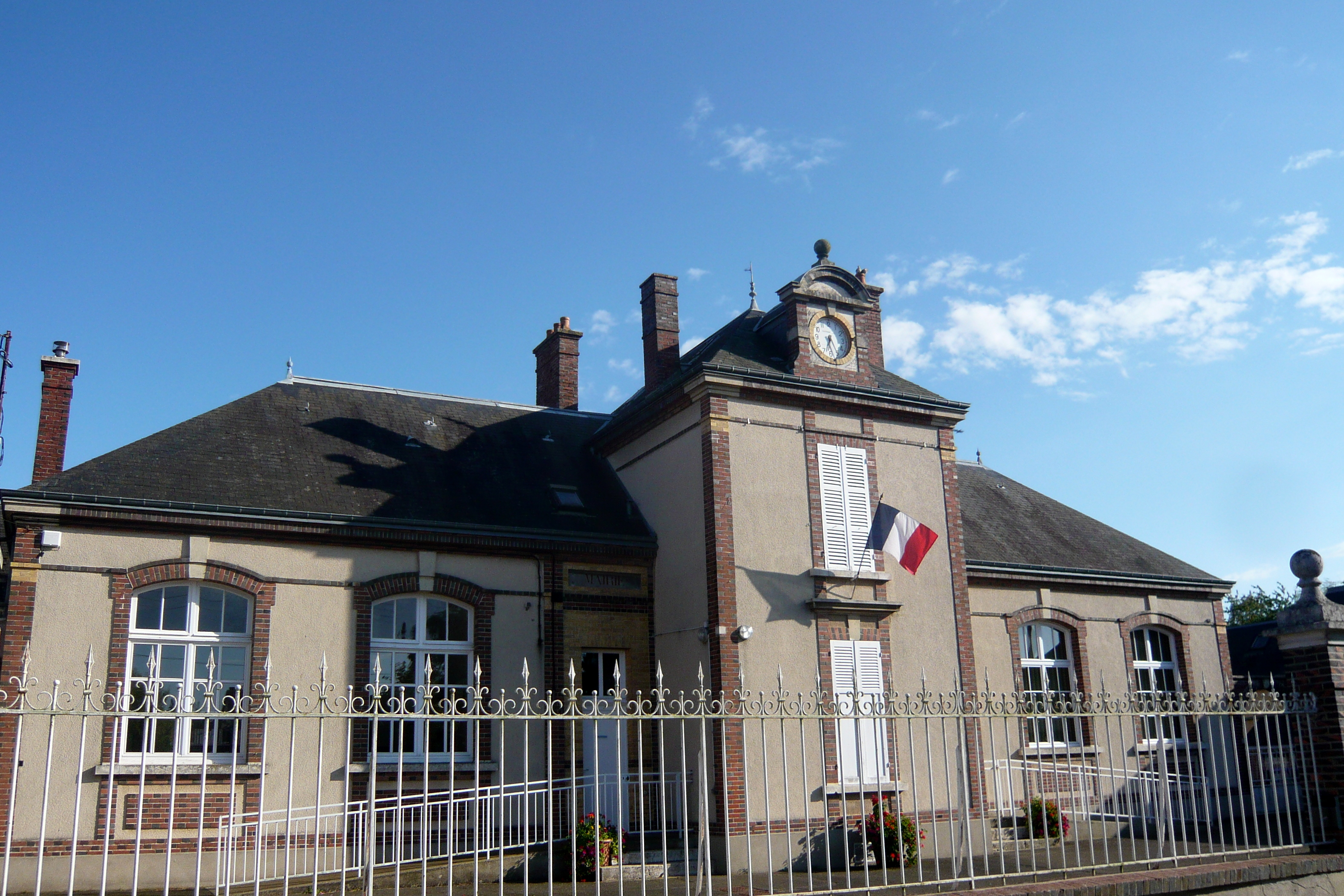
- The town hall in Chartainvilliers

- Coat of arms
- Location of Chartainvilliers
- Location within France Location within Centre-Val de Loire
- Coordinates: 48°32′42″N 1°33′13″E
- Country: France
- Region: Centre-Val de Loire
- Department: Eure-et-Loir
- Arrondissement: Chartres
- Canton: Épernon
- Intercommunality: CA Chartres Métropole

Government
  - Mayor (2020–2026): Alain Boutin
- Area^{1}: 9.07 km^{2} (3.50 sq mi)
- Elevation: 150 m (490 ft)
- Highest elevation: 167 m (548 ft)
- Lowest elevation: 109 m (358 ft)
- Population (2023): 654
  - Density: 72.1/km^{2} (187/sq mi)
- Time zone: UTC+01:00 (CET)
  - Summer (DST): UTC+02:00 (CEST)
- INSEE/Postal code: 28084 /28130
- ^{1} French Land Register data, which excludes lakes, ponds, glaciers > 1 km^{2} (0.386 sq mi or 247 acres) and river estuaries.

Chartainvilliers (French pronunciation: [ʃaʁtɛ̃vilje]) is a commune in the department of Eure-et-Loir and region of Centre-Val de Loire, north central France. It lies 12 km north-north-east of Chartres and some 70 km south-west of Paris.

== Population ==
Historical population
Year	Pop.	±% p.a.
1968	197	—
1975	239	+2.80%
1982	548	+12.59%
1990	560	+0.27%
1999	630	+1.32%
2007	750	+2.20%
2012	722	−0.76%
2017	727	+0.14%
2023	654	−1.75%
Source: INSEE

== See also ==
- Communes of the Eure-et-Loir department
