= Georges Cochon =

French anarchist (1879–1959)

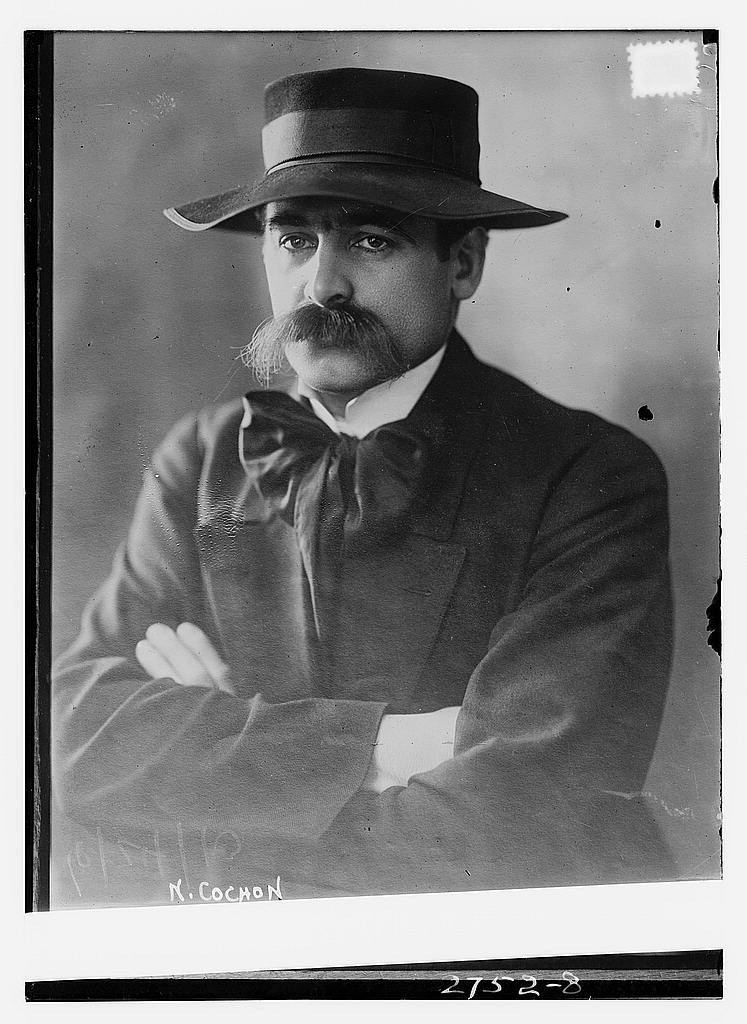
- Georges Cochon circa 1912-1913
- Born: 26 March 1879; Chartres
- Died: 25 April 1959 (aged 80); Maintenon
- Occupation: Trade unionist

Georges Cochon (1879–1959) was a tapestry maker, an anarchist and the secretary of the Federation of Tenants.

== Biography ==
He was born on March 26, 1879, in Chartres, France. In 1912 in Paris he developed a strategy to help tenants with overdue payments keep their belongings. He died on April 25, 1959.
