= Hanches =

- Commune
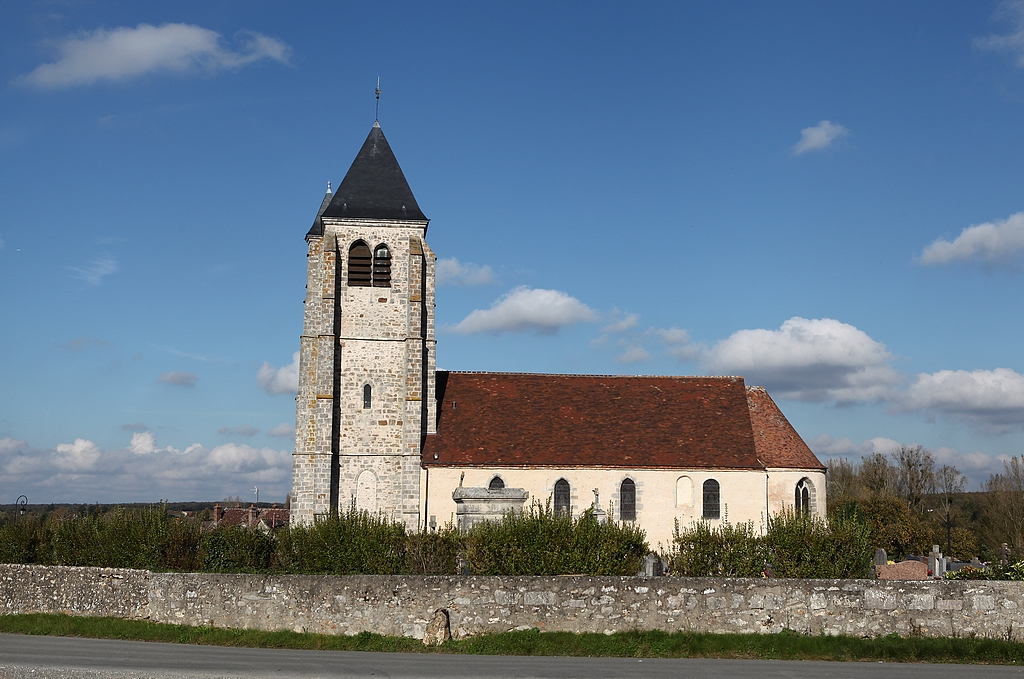
- The church in Hanches

- Coat of arms
- Location of Hanches
- Location within France Location within Centre-Val de Loire
- Coordinates: 48°36′11″N 1°38′52″E
- Country: France
- Region: Centre-Val de Loire
- Department: Eure-et-Loir
- Arrondissement: Chartres
- Canton: Épernon

Government
  - Mayor (2020–2026): Jean-Pierre Ruault
- Area^{1}: 16.04 km^{2} (6.19 sq mi)
- Highest elevation: 165 m (541 ft)
- Lowest elevation: 107 m (351 ft)
- Population (2023): 2,696
  - Density: 168.1/km^{2} (435.3/sq mi)
- Time zone: UTC+01:00 (CET)
  - Summer (DST): UTC+02:00 (CEST)
- INSEE/Postal code: 28191 /28130
- ^{1} French Land Register data, which excludes lakes, ponds, glaciers > 1 km^{2} (0.386 sq mi or 247 acres) and river estuaries.

Hanches (French pronunciation: [ɑ̃ʃ]) is a commune in the Eure-et-Loir department in northern France.

== Population ==
Historical population
| Year | Pop. | ±% p.a. |
|---|---|---|
| 1968 | 709 | — |
| 1975 | 1,206 | +7.88% |
| 1982 | 1,524 | +3.40% |
| 1990 | 2,084 | +3.99% |
| 1999 | 2,313 | +1.17% |
| 2007 | 2,618 | +1.56% |
| 2012 | 2,662 | +0.33% |
| 2017 | 2,701 | +0.29% |
| 2023 | 2,696 | −0.03% |
Source: INSEE

== See also ==
- Communes of the Eure-et-Loir department
