= Néron, Eure-et-Loir =

Néron
- Commune
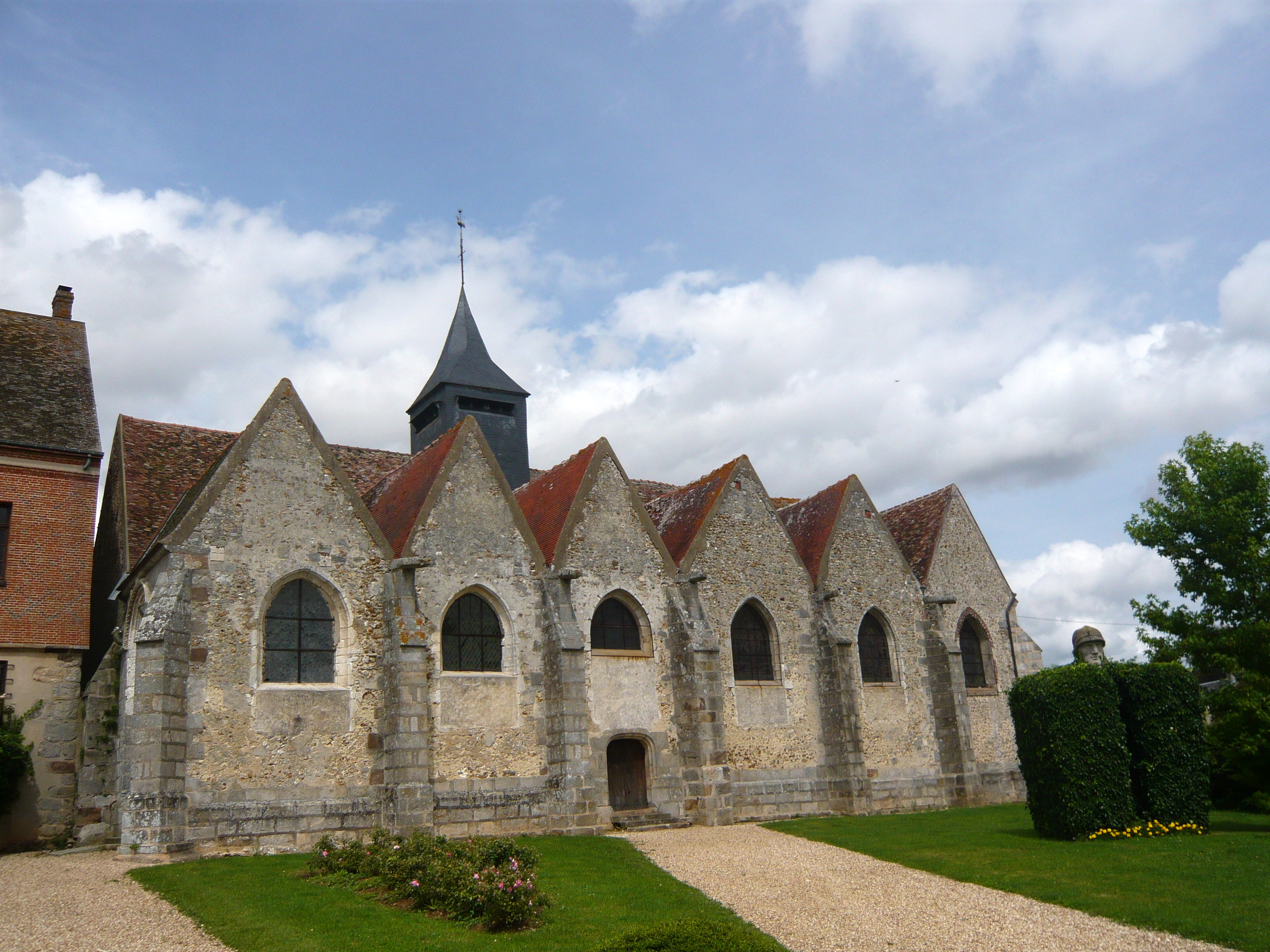
- The church in Néron
- Location of Néron
- Location within France Location within Centre-Val de Loire
- Coordinates: 48°36′11″N 1°30′57″E
- Country: France
- Region: Centre-Val de Loire
- Department: Eure-et-Loir
- Arrondissement: Dreux
- Canton: Épernon

Government
  - Mayor (2020–2026): Nicolas Dorkeld
- Area^{1}: 19.04 km^{2} (7.35 sq mi)
- Elevation: 88 m (289 ft)
- Highest elevation: 161 m (528 ft)
- Lowest elevation: 102 m (335 ft)
- Population (2023): 687
  - Density: 36.1/km^{2} (93.5/sq mi)
- Time zone: UTC+01:00 (CET)
  - Summer (DST): UTC+02:00 (CEST)
- INSEE/Postal code: 28275 /28210
- ^{1} French Land Register data, which excludes lakes, ponds, glaciers > 1 km^{2} (0.386 sq mi or 247 acres) and river estuaries.

Néron (French pronunciation: [neʁɔ̃]) is a commune in the Eure-et-Loir department in northern France.

== Population ==
Historical population
Year	Pop.	±% p.a.
1968	267	—
1975	311	+2.20%
1982	471	+6.11%
1990	616	+3.41%
1999	660	+0.77%
2007	634	−0.50%
2012	616	−0.57%
2017	656	+1.27%
2023	687	+0.77%
Source: INSEE

== See also ==
- Communes of the Eure-et-Loir department
