= Bouglainval =

- Commune
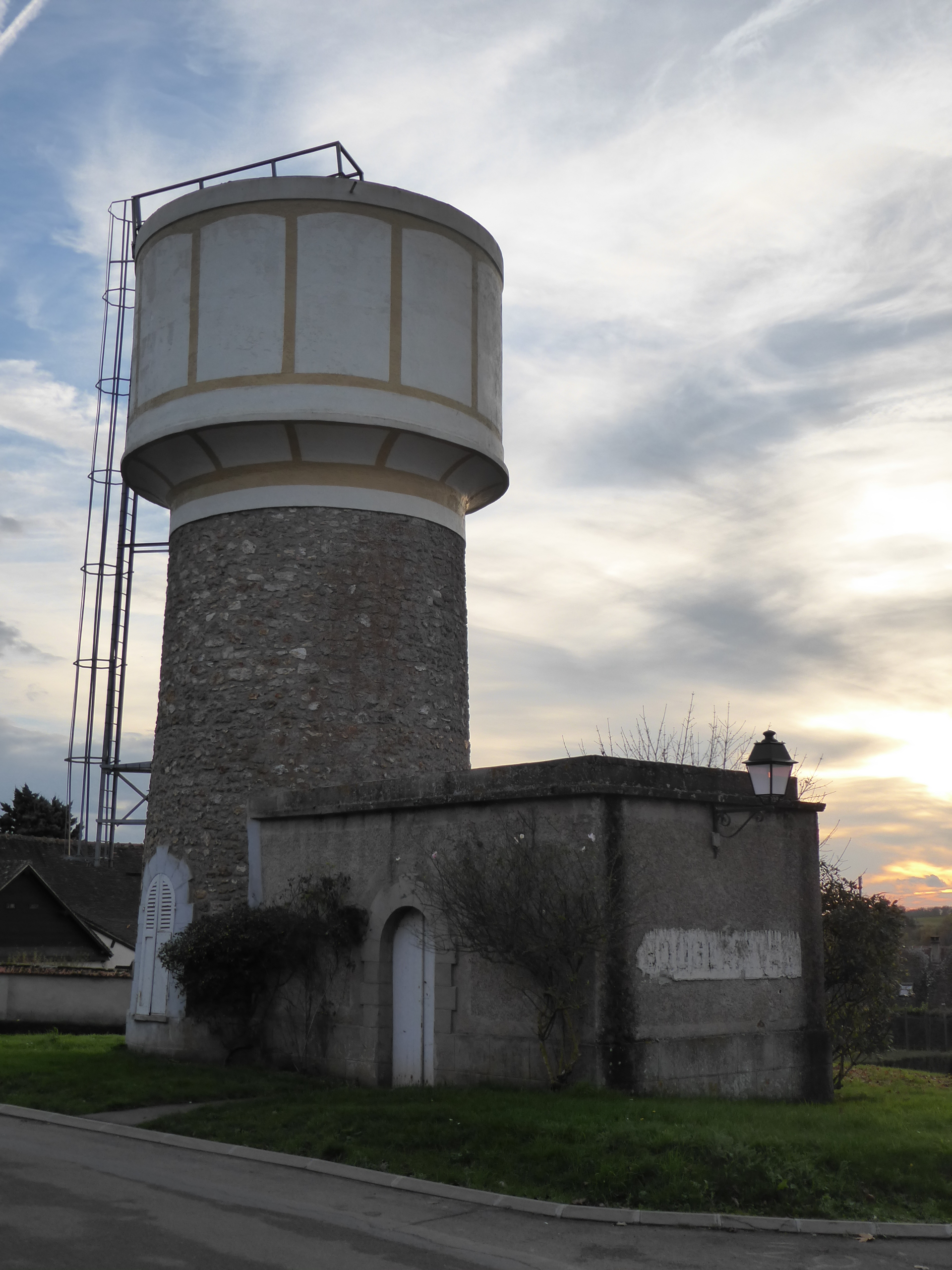
- The water tower in Bouglainval
- Location of Bouglainval
- Location within France Location within Centre-Val de Loire
- Coordinates: 48°33′54″N 1°30′33″E
- Country: France
- Region: Centre-Val de Loire
- Department: Eure-et-Loir
- Arrondissement: Chartres
- Canton: Épernon
- Intercommunality: CA Chartres Métropole

Government
  - Mayor (2020–2026): Philippe Baeteman
- Area^{1}: 14.2 km^{2} (5.5 sq mi)
- Highest elevation: 171 m (561 ft)
- Lowest elevation: 122 m (400 ft)
- Population (2023): 743
  - Density: 52.3/km^{2} (136/sq mi)
- Time zone: UTC+01:00 (CET)
  - Summer (DST): UTC+02:00 (CEST)
- INSEE/Postal code: 28052 /28130
- ^{1} French Land Register data, which excludes lakes, ponds, glaciers > 1 km^{2} (0.386 sq mi or 247 acres) and river estuaries.

Bouglainval (French pronunciation: [buɡlɛ̃val]) is a commune in the Eure-et-Loir department in northern France.

== Population ==
Historical population
| Year | Pop. | ±% p.a. |
|---|---|---|
| 1968 | 264 | — |
| 1975 | 329 | +3.19% |
| 1982 | 565 | +8.03% |
| 1990 | 753 | +3.66% |
| 1999 | 801 | +0.69% |
| 2007 | 744 | −0.92% |
| 2012 | 743 | −0.03% |
| 2017 | 767 | +0.64% |
| 2023 | 743 | −0.53% |
Source: INSEE

== See also ==
- Communes of the Eure-et-Loir department
