= Mévoisins =

- Commune
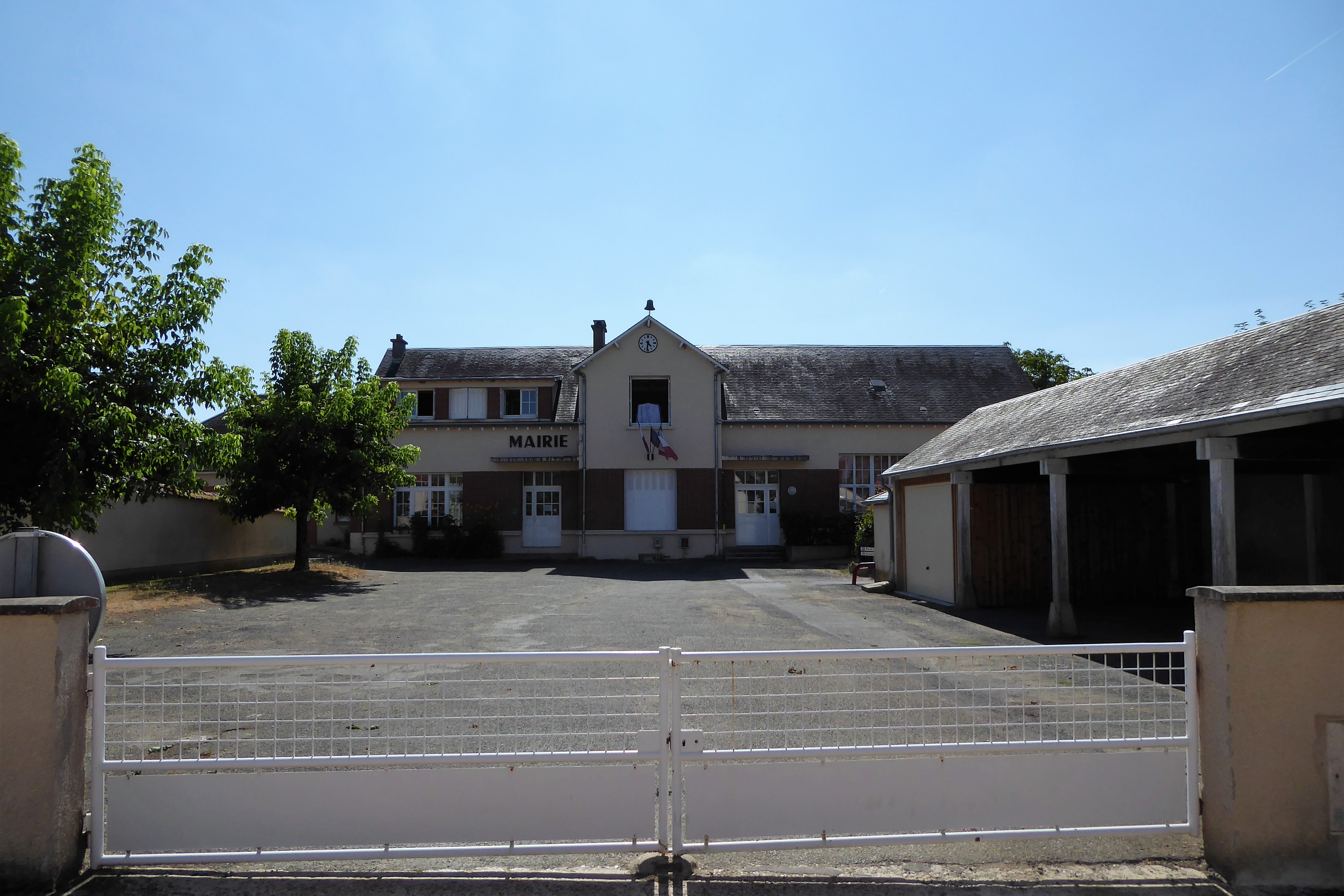
- The town hall in Mévoisins

- Coat of arms
- Location of Mévoisins
- Location within France Location within Centre-Val de Loire
- Coordinates: 48°33′04″N 1°35′33″E
- Country: France
- Region: Centre-Val de Loire
- Department: Eure-et-Loir
- Arrondissement: Chartres
- Canton: Épernon

Government
  - Mayor (2020–2026): Ann Grönborg
- Area^{1}: 4.28 km^{2} (1.65 sq mi)
- Elevation: 150 m (490 ft)
- Highest elevation: 150 m (490 ft)
- Lowest elevation: 100 m (330 ft)
- Population (2023): 615
  - Density: 144/km^{2} (372/sq mi)
- Time zone: UTC+01:00 (CET)
  - Summer (DST): UTC+02:00 (CEST)
- INSEE/Postal code: 28249 /28130
- ^{1} French Land Register data, which excludes lakes, ponds, glaciers > 1 km^{2} (0.386 sq mi or 247 acres) and river estuaries.

Mévoisins (French pronunciation: [mevwazɛ̃]) is a commune in the Eure-et-Loir department in northern France. Its mayor is Christian Bellanger.

== Population ==
Historical population
| Year | Pop. | ±% p.a. |
|---|---|---|
| 1968 | 268 | — |
| 1975 | 320 | +2.57% |
| 1982 | 460 | +5.32% |
| 1990 | 533 | +1.86% |
| 1999 | 634 | +1.95% |
| 2007 | 649 | +0.29% |
| 2012 | 631 | −0.56% |
| 2017 | 624 | −0.22% |
| 2023 | 615 | −0.24% |
Source: INSEE

== See also ==
- Communes of the Eure-et-Loir department
