= Villiers-le-Morhier =

- Commune
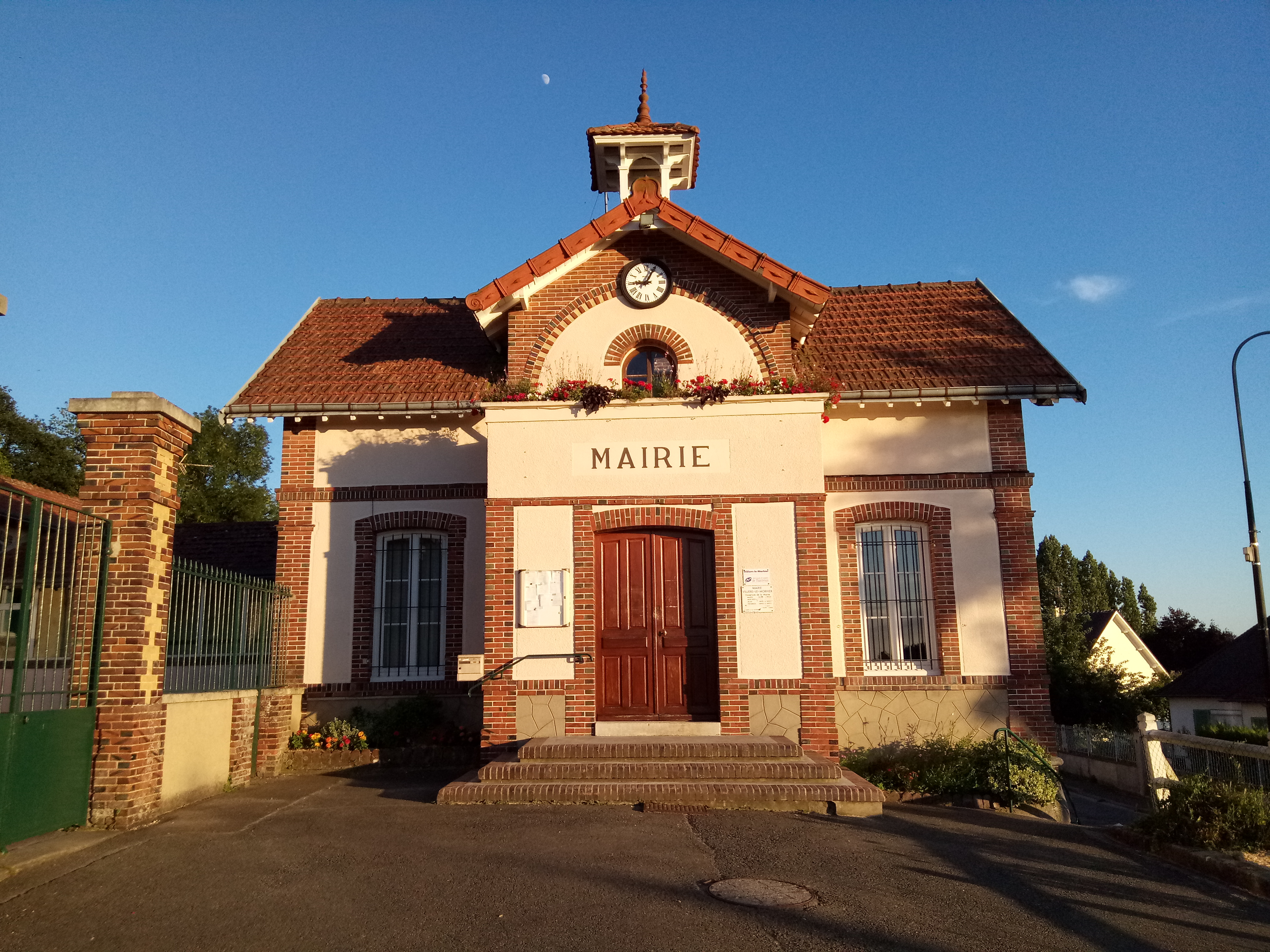
- The town hall in Villiers-le-Morhier

- Coat of arms
- Location of Villiers-le-Morhier
- Location within France Location within Centre-Val de Loire
- Coordinates: 48°37′18″N 1°33′47″E
- Country: France
- Region: Centre-Val de Loire
- Department: Eure-et-Loir
- Arrondissement: Dreux
- Canton: Épernon

Government
  - Mayor (2020–2026): Philippe Auffray
- Area^{1}: 10.39 km^{2} (4.01 sq mi)
- Elevation: 108 m (354 ft)
- Highest elevation: 150 m (490 ft)
- Lowest elevation: 92 m (302 ft)
- Population (2023): 1,351
  - Density: 130.0/km^{2} (336.8/sq mi)
- Time zone: UTC+01:00 (CET)
  - Summer (DST): UTC+02:00 (CEST)
- INSEE/Postal code: 28417 /28130
- ^{1} French Land Register data, which excludes lakes, ponds, glaciers > 1 km^{2} (0.386 sq mi or 247 acres) and river estuaries.

Villiers-le-Morhier (French pronunciation: [vilje lə mɔʁje]) is a commune in the Eure-et-Loir department in northern France.

== Population ==
Historical population
Year	Pop.	±% p.a.
1968	539	—
1975	592	+1.35%
1982	878	+5.79%
1990	1,077	+2.59%
1999	1,227	+1.46%
2007	1,329	+1.00%
2012	1,351	+0.33%
2017	1,339	−0.18%
2023	1,351	+0.15%
Source: INSEE

== See also ==
- Communes of the Eure-et-Loir department
