= Saint-Laurent-la-Gâtine =

- Commune
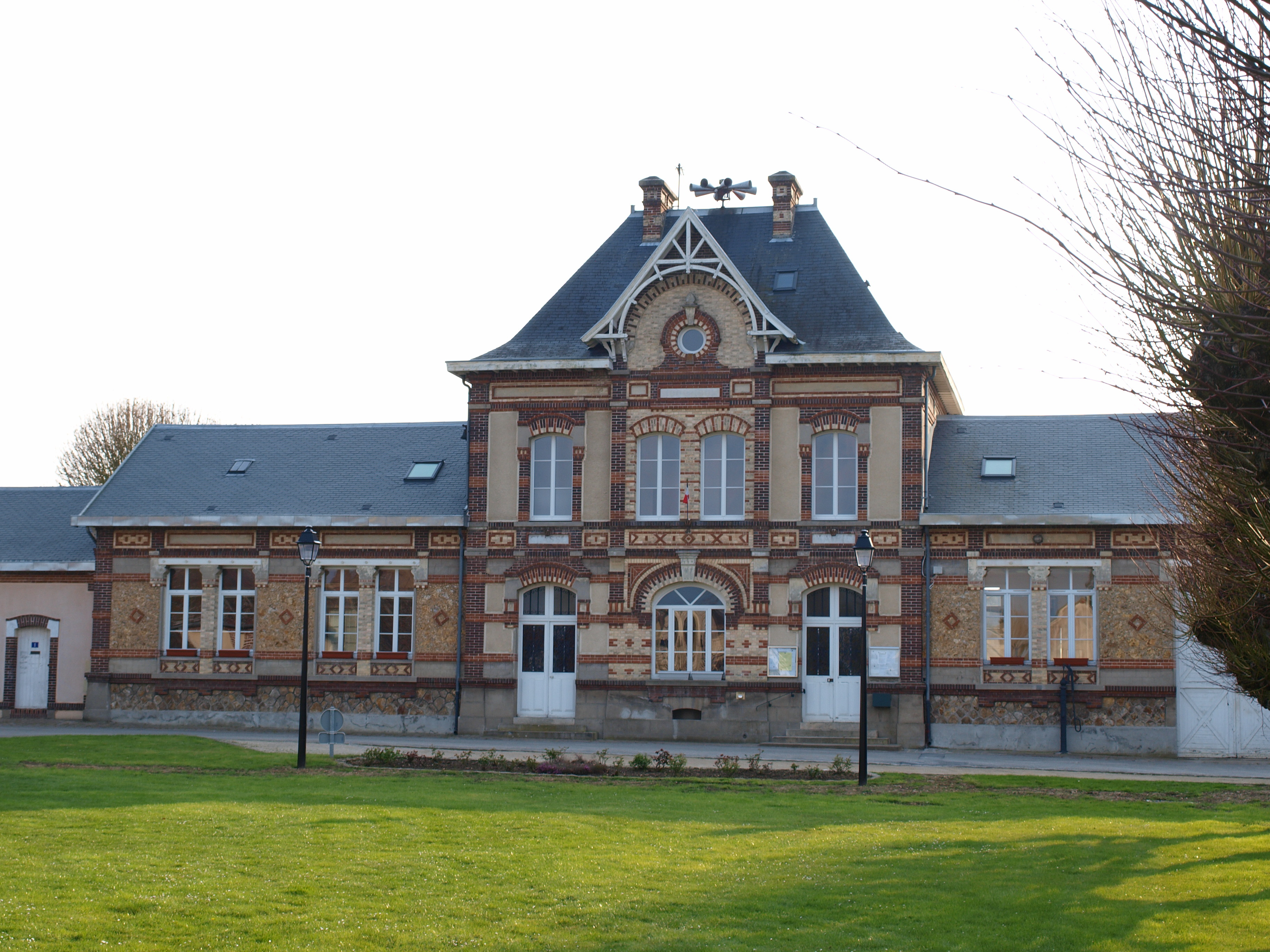
- The town hall in Saint-Laurent-la-Gâtine

- Coat of arms
- Location of Saint-Laurent-la-Gâtine
- Location within France Location within Centre-Val de Loire
- Coordinates: 48°41′37″N 1°31′33″E
- Country: France
- Region: Centre-Val de Loire
- Department: Eure-et-Loir
- Arrondissement: Dreux
- Canton: Épernon

Government
  - Mayor (2020–2026): Patrick Lenfant
- Area^{1}: 6.95 km^{2} (2.68 sq mi)
- Elevation: 135 m (443 ft)
- Highest elevation: 137 m (449 ft)
- Lowest elevation: 115 m (377 ft)
- Population (2023): 470
  - Density: 68/km^{2} (180/sq mi)
- Time zone: UTC+01:00 (CET)
  - Summer (DST): UTC+02:00 (CEST)
- INSEE/Postal code: 28343 /28210
- ^{1} French Land Register data, which excludes lakes, ponds, glaciers > 1 km^{2} (0.386 sq mi or 247 acres) and river estuaries.

Saint-Laurent-la-Gâtine (French pronunciation: [sɛ̃ loʁɑ̃ la ɡatin]) is a commune in the Eure-et-Loir department in northern France.

== Population ==
Historical population
Year	Pop.	±% p.a.
1968	218	—
1975	222	+0.26%
1982	258	+2.17%
1990	347	+3.77%
1999	401	+1.62%
2007	452	+1.51%
2012	448	−0.18%
2017	441	−0.31%
2023	470	+1.07%
Source: INSEE

== See also ==
- Communes of the Eure-et-Loir department
