= Canton of Épernon =

Coordinates: 48.61°N 1.68°E

The Canton of Épernon (French: canton d'Épernon) is an administrative division of the Eure-et-Loir department, Centre-Val de Loire, France. It was created at the French canton reorganisation which came into effect in March 2015. Its prefecture is Épernon.

It consists of the following communes:

1. Bouglainval
2. Chartainvilliers
3. Coulombs
4. Droue-sur-Drouette
5. Épernon
6. Faverolles
7. Gas
8. Hanches
9. Houx
10. Lormaye
11. Maintenon
12. Mévoisins
13. Néron
14. Nogent-le-Roi
15. Pierres
16. Les Pinthières
17. Saint-Laurent-la-Gâtine
18. Saint-Lucien
19. Saint-Martin-de-Nigelles
20. Saint-Piat
21. Senantes
22. Soulaires
23. Villiers-le-Morhier
