= Les Pinthières =

- Commune
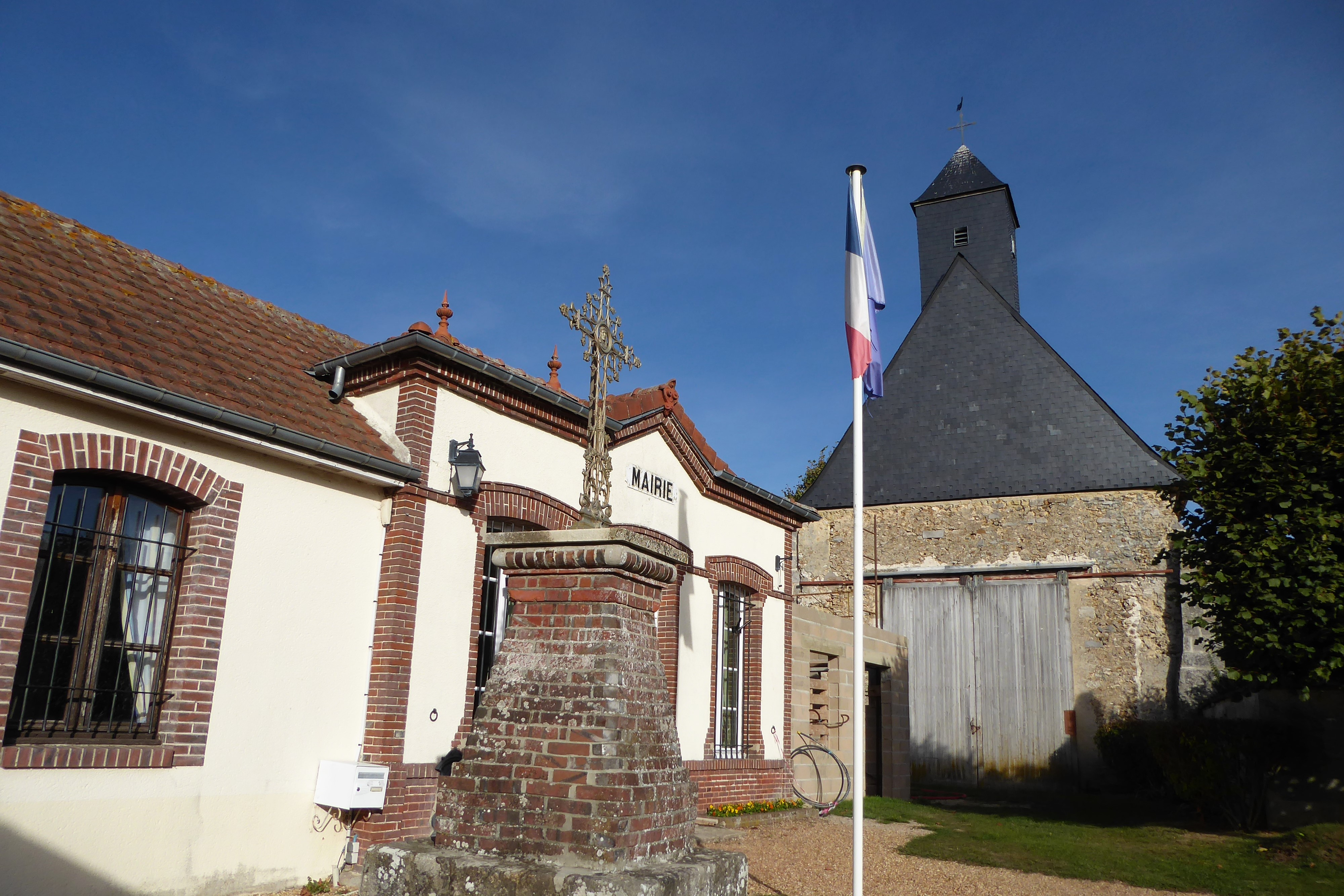
- The town hall and church in Les Pinthières
- Location of Les Pinthières
- Location within France Location within Centre-Val de Loire
- Coordinates: 48°42′09″N 1°34′11″E
- Country: France
- Region: Centre-Val de Loire
- Department: Eure-et-Loir
- Arrondissement: Dreux
- Canton: Épernon

Government
  - Mayor (2020–2026): Pierre Goudin
- Area^{1}: 4.01 km^{2} (1.55 sq mi)
- Elevation: 140 m (460 ft)
- Highest elevation: 153 m (502 ft)
- Lowest elevation: 131 m (430 ft)
- Population (2023): 165
  - Density: 41.1/km^{2} (107/sq mi)
- Time zone: UTC+01:00 (CET)
  - Summer (DST): UTC+02:00 (CEST)
- INSEE/Postal code: 28299 /28210
- ^{1} French Land Register data, which excludes lakes, ponds, glaciers > 1 km^{2} (0.386 sq mi or 247 acres) and river estuaries.

Les Pinthières (French pronunciation: [le pɛ̃tjɛʁ]) is a commune in the Eure-et-Loir department in northern France.

== Population ==
Historical population
Year	Pop.	±% p.a.
1968	65	—
1975	59	−1.37%
1982	55	−1.00%
1990	93	+6.79%
1999	132	+3.97%
2007	170	+3.21%
2012	184	+1.60%
2017	178	−0.66%
2023	165	−1.26%
Source: INSEE

== See also ==
- Communes of the Eure-et-Loir department
