= Houx =

- Commune
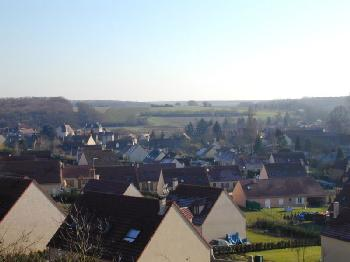
- A general view of Houx

- Coat of arms
- Location of Houx
- Location within France Location within Centre-Val de Loire
- Coordinates: 48°33′58″N 1°37′12″E
- Country: France
- Region: Centre-Val de Loire
- Department: Eure-et-Loir
- Arrondissement: Chartres
- Canton: Épernon
- Intercommunality: CA Chartres Métropole

Government
  - Mayor (2020–2026): Victor Briar
- Area^{1}: 6.24 km^{2} (2.41 sq mi)
- Highest elevation: 142 m (466 ft)
- Lowest elevation: 102 m (335 ft)
- Population (2023): 746
  - Density: 120/km^{2} (310/sq mi)
- Time zone: UTC+01:00 (CET)
  - Summer (DST): UTC+02:00 (CEST)
- INSEE/Postal code: 28195 /28130
- Website: https://web.archive.org/web/20091006020654/http://houx.fr/
- ^{1} French Land Register data, which excludes lakes, ponds, glaciers > 1 km^{2} (0.386 sq mi or 247 acres) and river estuaries.

Houx (French pronunciation: [u]) is a commune in the Eure-et-Loir department in northern France, located 79 km from Paris and 20 km from Chartres.

== Population ==
Historical population
Year	Pop.	±% p.a.
1968	240	—
1975	260	+1.15%
1982	303	+2.21%
1990	428	+4.41%
1999	653	+4.81%
2007	795	+2.49%
2012	809	+0.35%
2017	758	−1.29%
2023	746	−0.27%
Source: INSEE

== See also ==
- Communes of the Eure-et-Loir department
