= Maintenon =

- Commune
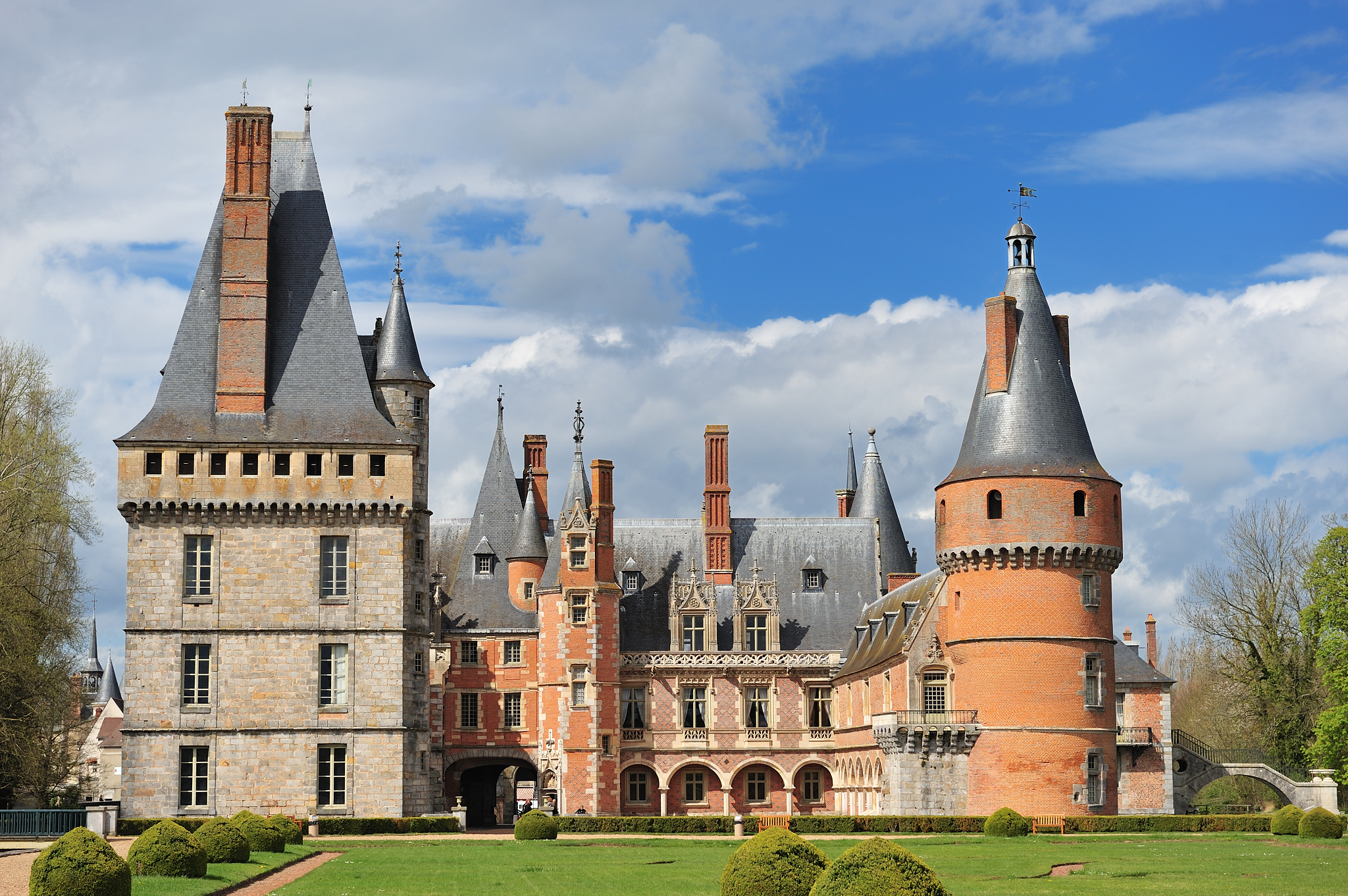
- Château de Maintenon in the town center

- Coat of arms
- Location of Maintenon
- Location within France Location within Centre-Val de Loire
- Coordinates: 48°35′19″N 1°34′46″E
- Country: France
- Region: Centre-Val de Loire
- Department: Eure-et-Loir
- Arrondissement: Chartres
- Canton: Épernon
- Intercommunality: CA Chartres Métropole

Government
  - Mayor (2020–2026): Thomas Laforge
- Area^{1}: 11.44 km^{2} (4.42 sq mi)
- Elevation: 120 m (390 ft)
- Highest elevation: 166 m (545 ft)
- Lowest elevation: 97 m (318 ft)
- Population (2023): 4,494
  - Density: 392.8/km^{2} (1,017/sq mi)
- Time zone: UTC+01:00 (CET)
  - Summer (DST): UTC+02:00 (CEST)
- INSEE/Postal code: 28227 /28130
- ^{1} French Land Register data, which excludes lakes, ponds, glaciers > 1 km^{2} (0.386 sq mi or 247 acres) and river estuaries.

Maintenon (French pronunciation: [mɛ̃tənɔ̃]) is a commune in the metropolitan area of Paris, France. It is located 63.5 km (39.5 mi) southwest of the center of Paris.

Maintenon, together with the neighbouring commune of Pierres, form an urban area of 7,324 inhabitants (2022).

== History ==
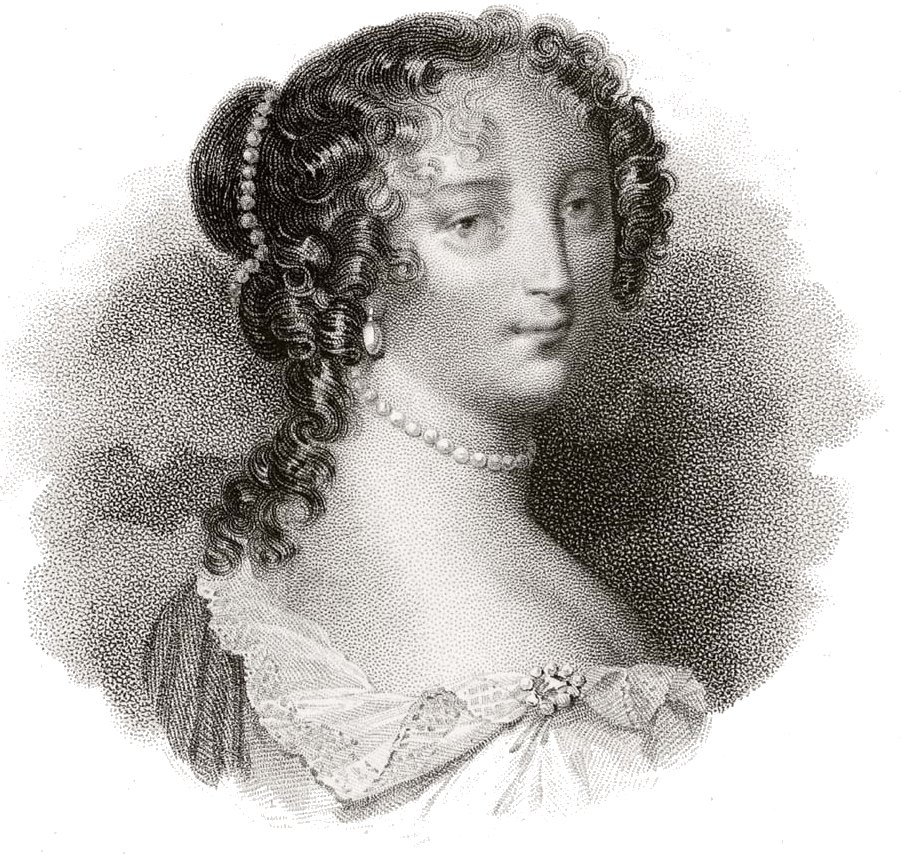
Françoise d'Aubigné, Marquise de Maintenon

Maintenon is known for its picturesque Château de Maintenon, first home to the family d’Angennes, Marquis de Maintenon, later home of Madame de Maintenon, morganatic second wife of King Louis XIV.

Another tourist attraction is the ruined aqueduct of Maintenon, built by Louis XIV to carry water from the Eure to the gardens of the Palace of Versailles.

== Population ==
Historical population
Year	Pop.	±% p.a.
1968	3,325	—
1975	3,313	−0.05%
1982	3,388	+0.32%
1990	4,161	+2.60%
1999	4,440	+0.72%
2007	4,441	+0.00%
2012	4,418	−0.10%
2017	4,292	−0.58%
2023	4,494	+0.77%
Source: INSEE

== People ==
- Françoise d'Aubigné, marquise de Maintenon
- Françoise-Marie de Bourbon - youngest daughter of Madame de Montespan and Louis XIV, born here in 1677

== Transportation ==
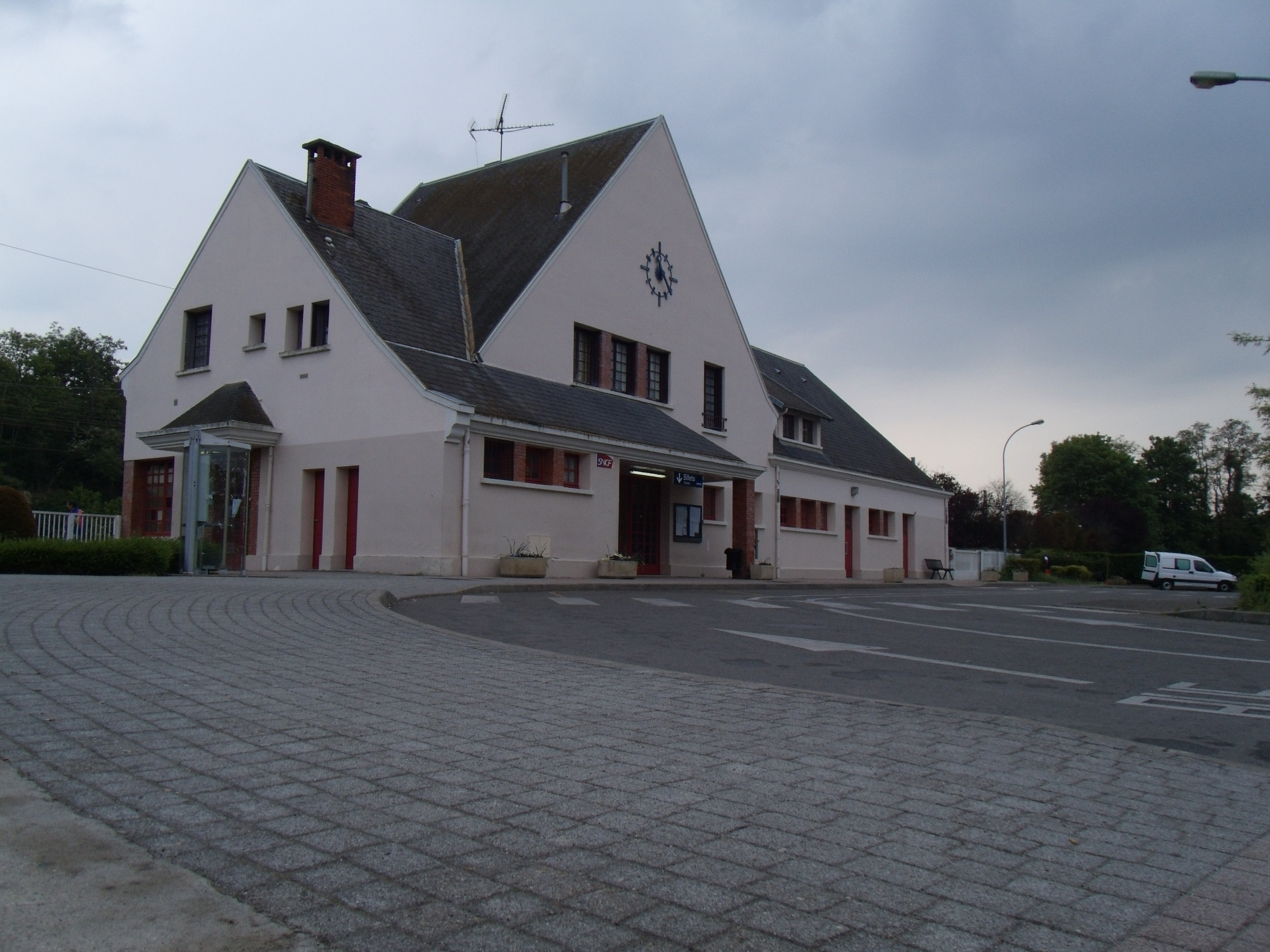
The station

Maintenon is served by Maintenon station on the fast regional rail line between Paris and Le Mans via Chartres. Maintenon is connected to the Ile de France network of suburban trains which start at Rambouillet.

== See also ==
- Communes of the Eure-et-Loir department
