= Voise (river) =

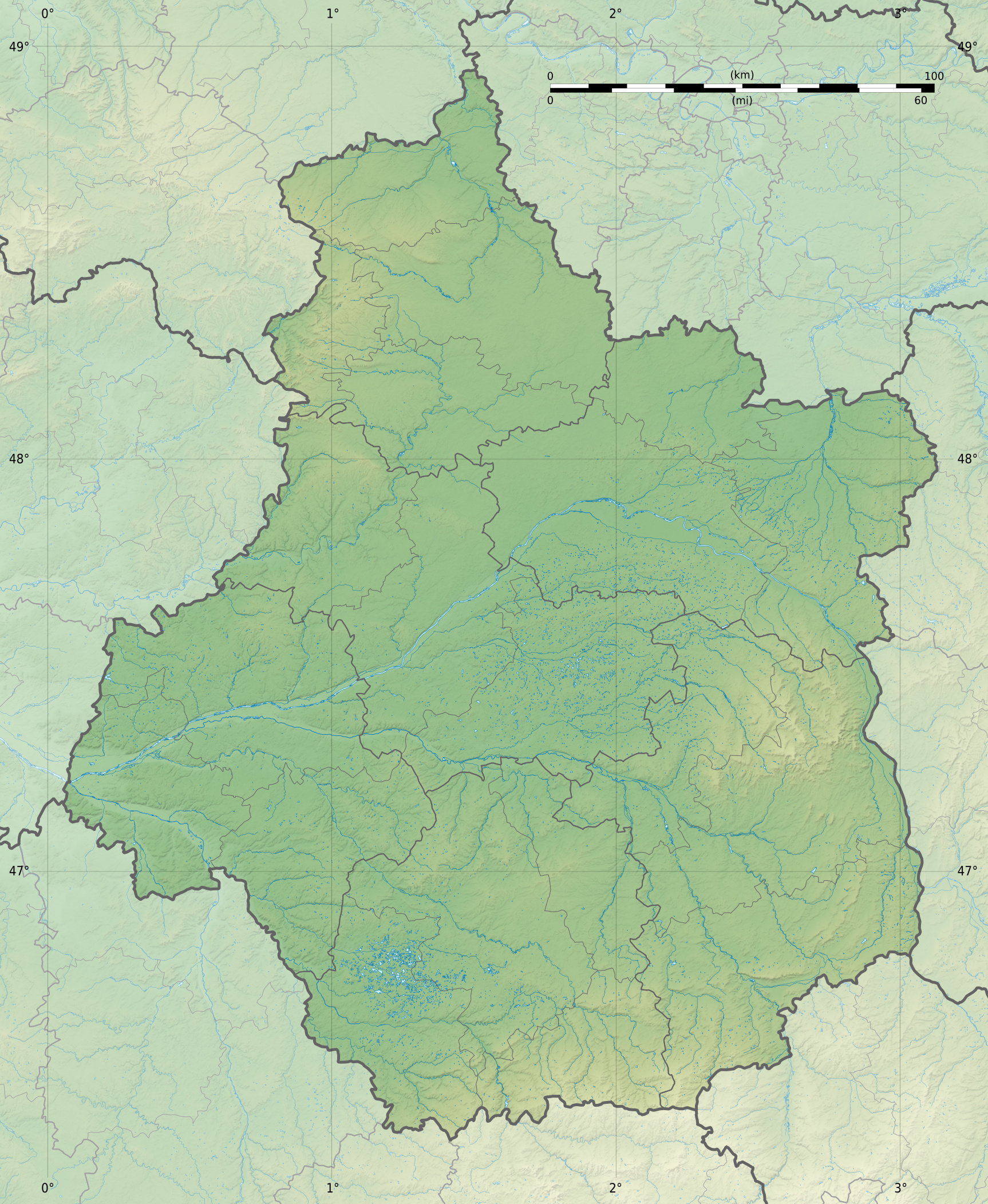
- Location within France Location within Centre-Val de Loire

Location
- Country: France

Physical characteristics
- Mouth: Eure
  - coordinates: 48°36′01″N 1°34′00″E
- Length: 33.0 km (20.5 mi)

Basin features
- Progression: Eure→ Seine→ English Channel

The Voise is a river in Eure-et-Loir which flows into the right bank of Eure, which is a tributary of the Seine. It is 33.0 km (20.5 mi) long.

== Gallery ==
La Voise, from upstream to downstream

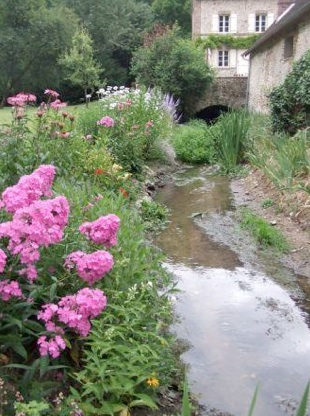
Oinville-sous-Auneau

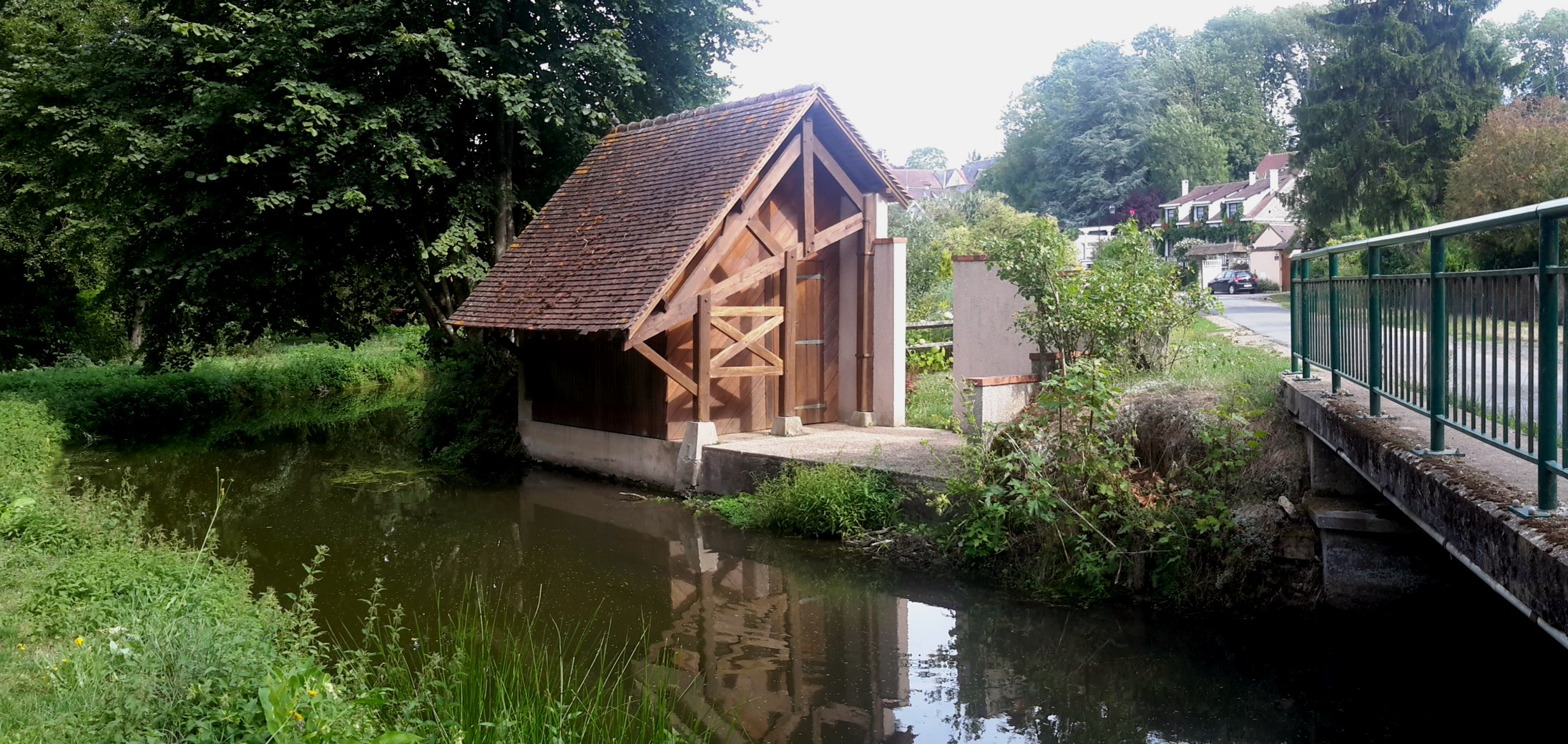
Levainville

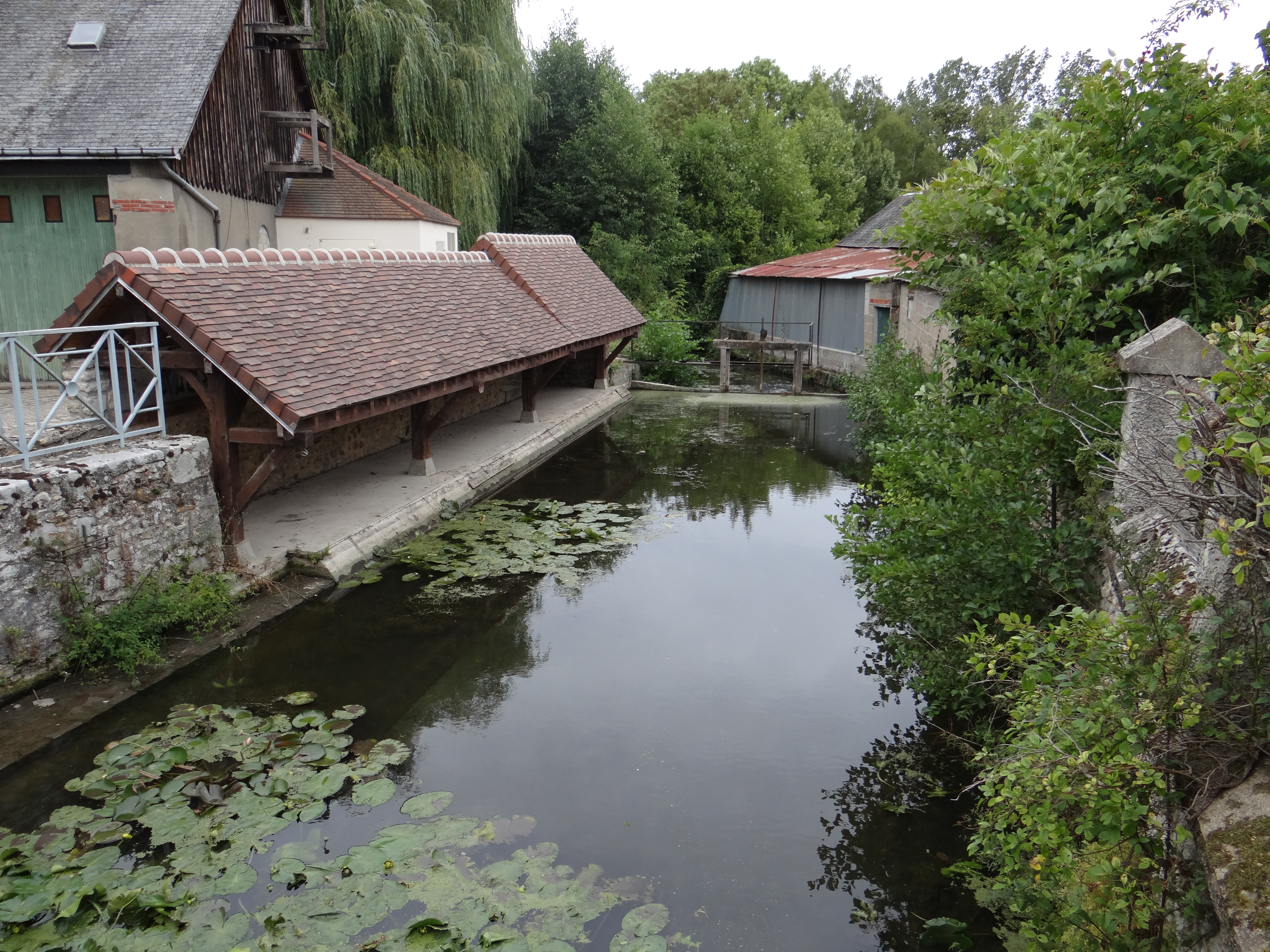
Le Gué-de-Longroi
