= Gas, Eure-et-Loir =

Gas
- Commune
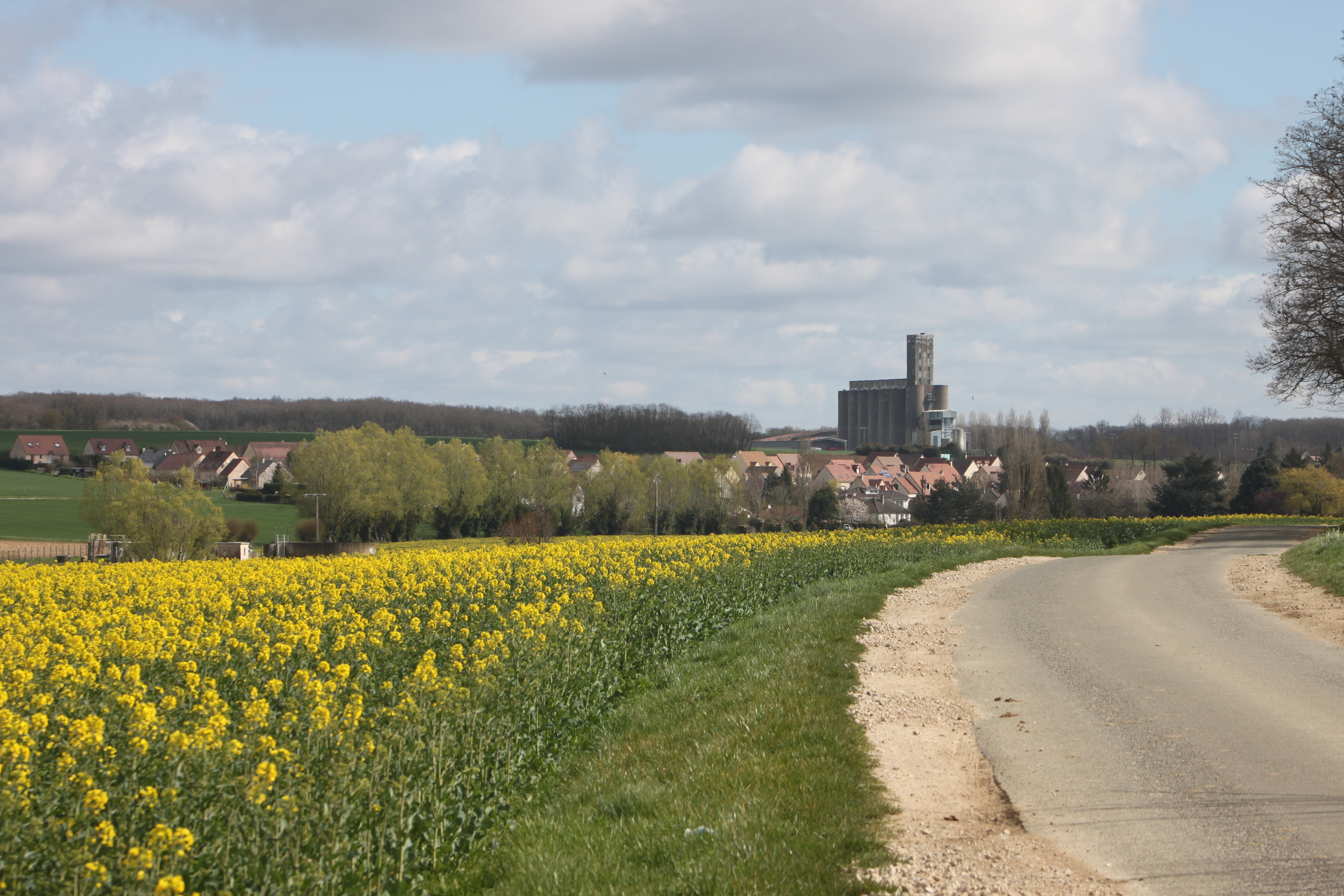
- A general view of Gas

- Coat of arms
- Location of Gas
- Location within France Location within Centre-Val de Loire
- Coordinates: 48°33′58″N 1°40′05″E
- Country: France
- Region: Centre-Val de Loire
- Department: Eure-et-Loir
- Arrondissement: Chartres
- Canton: Épernon
- Intercommunality: Portes Euréliennes d'Île-de-France

Government
  - Mayor (2020–2026): Anne Bracco
- Area^{1}: 11.97 km^{2} (4.62 sq mi)
- Elevation: 1,071 m (3,514 ft)
- Highest elevation: 161 m (528 ft)
- Lowest elevation: 107 m (351 ft)
- Population (2023): 718
  - Density: 60.0/km^{2} (155/sq mi)
- Time zone: UTC+01:00 (CET)
  - Summer (DST): UTC+02:00 (CEST)
- INSEE/Postal code: 28172 /28320
- ^{1} French Land Register data, which excludes lakes, ponds, glaciers > 1 km^{2} (0.386 sq mi or 247 acres) and river estuaries.

Gas is a commune in the Eure-et-Loir department in northern France.

== Population ==
Historical population
| Year | Pop. | ±% p.a. |
|---|---|---|
| 1968 | 255 | — |
| 1975 | 305 | +2.59% |
| 1982 | 587 | +9.80% |
| 1990 | 623 | +0.75% |
| 1999 | 634 | +0.19% |
| 2007 | 740 | +1.95% |
| 2012 | 756 | +0.43% |
| 2017 | 792 | +0.93% |
| 2023 | 718 | −1.62% |
Source: INSEE

== See also ==
- Communes of the Eure-et-Loir department
