= Senantes, Eure-et-Loir =

Senantes
- Commune
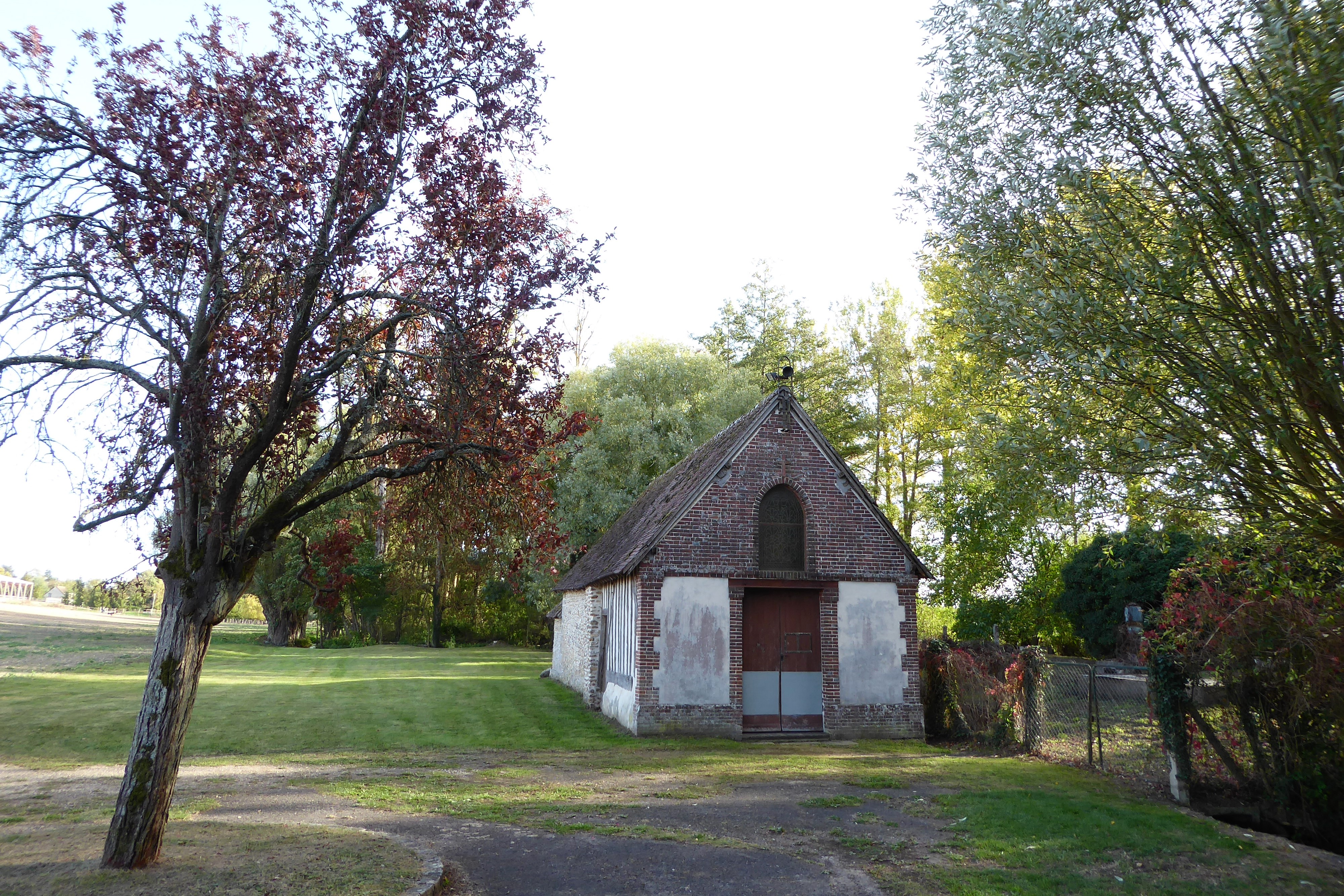
- The chapel in Senantes

- Coat of arms
- Location of Senantes
- Location within France Location within Centre-Val de Loire
- Coordinates: 48°39′12″N 1°34′56″E
- Country: France
- Region: Centre-Val de Loire
- Department: Eure-et-Loir
- Arrondissement: Dreux
- Canton: Épernon
- Intercommunality: Portes Euréliennes d'Île-de-France

Government
  - Mayor (2020–2026): Arnaud Breuil
- Area^{1}: 7.57 km^{2} (2.92 sq mi)
- Elevation: 115 m (377 ft)
- Highest elevation: 149 m (489 ft)
- Lowest elevation: 112 m (367 ft)
- Population (2023): 528
  - Density: 69.7/km^{2} (181/sq mi)
- Time zone: UTC+01:00 (CET)
  - Summer (DST): UTC+02:00 (CEST)
- INSEE/Postal code: 28372 /28210
- ^{1} French Land Register data, which excludes lakes, ponds, glaciers > 1 km^{2} (0.386 sq mi or 247 acres) and river estuaries.

Senantes (French pronunciation: [sənɑ̃t]) is a commune in the Eure-et-Loir department in northern France.

== Population ==
Historical population
Year	Pop.	±% p.a.
1968	203	—
1975	243	+2.60%
1982	409	+7.72%
1990	434	+0.74%
1999	524	+2.12%
2007	640	+2.53%
2012	612	−0.89%
2017	582	−1.00%
2023	528	−1.61%
Source: INSEE

== See also ==
- Communes of the Eure-et-Loir department
