= Cochonnaille =

Pork product

Cochonnaille is a pork product and can refer to an assortment of sausages with or without pâtés that is served as a first course.

== See also ==
- Cochon
