= Saint-Lucien, Eure-et-Loir =

Saint-Lucien
- Commune
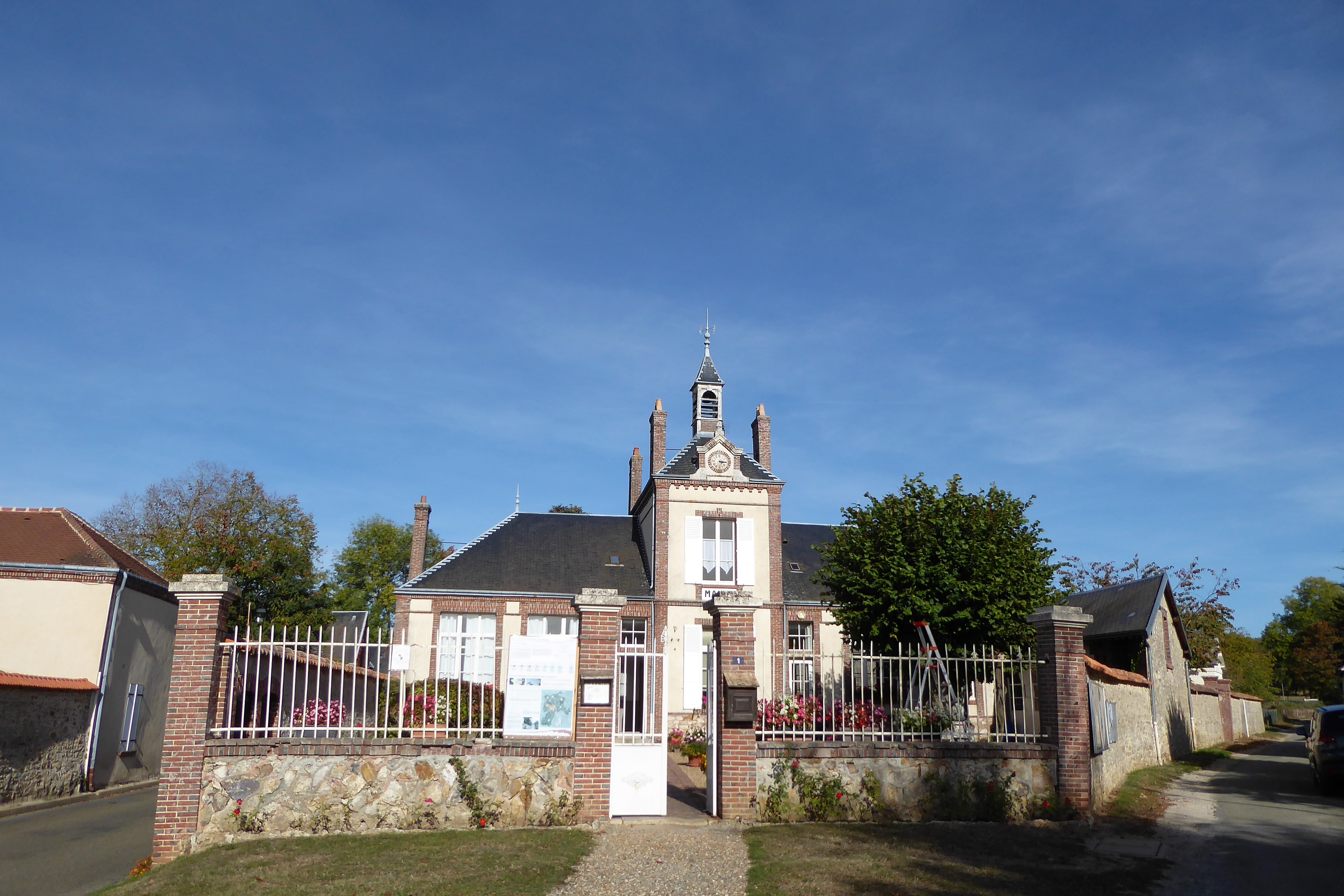
- The town hall in Saint-Lucien
- Location of Saint-Lucien
- Location within France Location within Centre-Val de Loire
- Coordinates: 48°38′55″N 1°37′29″E
- Country: France
- Region: Centre-Val de Loire
- Department: Eure-et-Loir
- Arrondissement: Dreux
- Canton: Épernon
- Intercommunality: CC Portes Euréliennes d'Île-de-France

Government
  - Mayor (2020–2026): Catherine Debray
- Area^{1}: 8.71 km^{2} (3.36 sq mi)
- Elevation: 117 m (384 ft)
- Highest elevation: 166 m (545 ft)
- Lowest elevation: 117 m (384 ft)
- Population (2023): 283
  - Density: 32.5/km^{2} (84.2/sq mi)
- Time zone: UTC+01:00 (CET)
  - Summer (DST): UTC+02:00 (CEST)
- INSEE/Postal code: 28349 /28210
- ^{1} French Land Register data, which excludes lakes, ponds, glaciers > 1 km^{2} (0.386 sq mi or 247 acres) and river estuaries.

Saint-Lucien (French pronunciation: [sɛ̃ lysjɛ̃]) is a commune in the Eure-et-Loir department in northern France.

== Population ==
Historical population
Year	Pop.	±% p.a.
1968	129	—
1975	153	+2.47%
1982	167	+1.26%
1990	201	+2.34%
1999	244	+2.18%
2007	226	−0.95%
2012	241	+1.29%
2017	254	+1.06%
2023	283	+1.82%
Source: INSEE

== See also ==
- Communes of the Eure-et-Loir department
