= Beare (surname) =

Beare is a surname. Notable people with the surname include:

- Arthur Beare (disambiguation), multiple people
- Charles Beare (1937–2025), British violin expert and craftsman
- Donal Cam O'Sullivan Beare (1560–1618), Irish ruler of the O'Sullivan clan
- Ellis Beare, English politician
- Garin Beare (born 1939), Zimbabwean bowler
- Gary Beare (born 1952), American baseball player
- George Beare (disambiguation), multiple people
- Gerry Beare (1905–1983), Australian rules footballer
- Hedley Beare (1932–2010), Australian educator and author
- James Beare, English mariner
- John Beare (1820–1914), Canadian farmer
- Jon Beare (born 1974), Canadian rower
- Kathryn Beare (1917–1997), American baseball player
- Lisa Beare (born 1975), Canadian politician
- Nikki Beare (1928–2014), American journalist and lobbyist
- Norah Beare (born 1946), Northern Irish politician
- Philip O'Sullivan Beare (c. 1590–1636), Irish soldier and author
- Simon Beare (born 1979), New Zealand cricketer
- Sir Thomas Hudson Beare (1859–1940), British engineer
- Thomas Hudson Beare (pioneer) (1792–1861), British settler in South Australia
- William Beare (1933–2019), Irish Anglican priest and Dean of Lismore from 1999 to 2008
- William Beare (Latinist) (1900–1963), British Latinist and expert on ancient Roman theatre

== In Fiction ==
- Maggie Beare and Arthur Beare, main characters in the Australian TV series Mother and Son, played by Ruth Cracknell and Garry McDonald
