= 16th century in North American history =

The European explorer-colonial historical record in North America begins in the second half of the 16th century, with ongoing European exploration.

== Timeline ==
1524

Giovanni da Verrazzano explored the East Coast of North America from Florida to presumably Newfoundland in 1524.

1534

Jacques Cartier made a series of voyages on behalf of the French crown in 1534 and explored the St. Lawrence River.

1539

In the futile search of gold, Hernando de Soto explored the inland from Florida to Arkansas, introducing swine to southern North America and effectively improving European knowledge about the geography, biology, and ethnology of the New World.

1568

André Thevet's The new found worlde, or Antarctike is an English translation of Thevet's Les singularitez de la France antarctique, first published in 1558.

André Thevet was a Franciscan friar who accompanied Villegagnon in 1555 when he went to establish a French colony on the coast of Brazil. He was there for only a few months, but in that time gained a considerable knowledge of the manners and customs of the natives. His observations were considered unreliable by some of his contemporaries and there is still some doubt as to whether or not his accounts can be regarded as accurate.

By his translation of Thevet, Thomas Hacket presented the first account in English of a curious American custom – the smoking of tobacco by means of burning leaves wrapped in a small cylinder (the cigar), or in a pipe: "Their maner to use it, is this, they wrappe a quantitie of this herbe being dry in a leafe of a palme tree which is very great, and so they make rolles of the length of a cãdle, and than they fire the one end, and receive the smoke therof by their nose and by their mouthe." Thevet's account of this practice is the first clear description of the cigar and its use.

1576

Sir Humphrey Gilbert published his book, A discourse of a discoverie for a new passage to Cataia. This book, which is an essay to prove the practicality of the Northwest Passage, was written partly in support of Gilbert's still unanswered petition of November 1566 for privileges "concerning the discoveringe of a passage by the North west to go to Cataia", partly to reassure his elder brother, Sir John, who, having no issue, was averse to Sir Humphrey embarking personally on such an enterprise. Gilbert had shown his friend, the poet George Gascoigne, "sundrie profitable and verie commendable exercises which he had perfected painefully with his owne penne"; one of these "exercises" was the Discourse. Gascoigne edited it and published it in 1576, probably without Gilbert's authority. In 1583 Gilbert landed at Newfoundland and there founded the first British colony in North America. After a voyage of discovery along the south coast he sailed for home, but was lost in a storm off the southern Azores. A year later his patents were renewed in the name of his half-brother, Sir Walter Raleigh.

Late 1570s

Martin Frobisher, licensed by Elizabeth I and backed by a group of merchant adventurers, sought gold in the New World and a Northwest Passage to the Orient. George Best accompanied Frobisher on all of his three voyages (in 1576, 1577 and 1578) and this work is the first account of them. It has two maps drawn by James Beare, Frobisher's principal surveyor, The rough outline map of the west of Europe, Groenland and "the supposed fyrmeland of America" wrongly convinced many people in England that the Northwest Passage had actually been discovered. But it was not until the late nineteenth century that the actual existence of a Northwest Passage was proved and only at the beginning of this century that the transit was made. Frobisher discovered Hudson Strait (which he named Mistaken Strait) and returned home with shiploads of fool's gold (iron pyrites) and mica, which finally served as road building material.

1577

Richard Eden published The history of travayle in the West and East Indies in 1577—this is not a reprint of the 1555 edition, although, like that, the larger portion is taken up with Peter Martyr d'Anghiera's Decades of the New World, the first formal history of the Americas, and Gonzalo Fernández de Oviedo y Valdés (Oviedo)' History of the West Indies. It contains a number of important additions not to be found in the earlier edition and appeared after the death of Eden.

This is the earliest collection of voyages in the English language and is of great historical importance. It contains the "Bull of Pope Alexander", in Latin and English, by which the world was divided between Spain and Portugal, as well as translations of the most important parts of the works of Oviedo, Maximilian of Transylvania, Vespuccius, Gomara, and others, pertaining to the maritime discovery of the New World.

1581

Augustin de Zarate, the Comptroller of Accounts for Castile, was sent out as Treasurer-General with the first viceroy, Blasco Nuñez de Vela, to examine the financial affairs of Peru. During his stay at Lima, he carefully collected notes and materials in his journal and, on his return to Spain, began the compilation of a history of Peru from the discovery of Pizarro to the departure of Gasca. He had access to the best official sources of information, and his work is not without value, though strongly prejudiced. The Historia del descubrimiento y conquista del Peru (The strange and delectable history of the discoverie and conquest of the provinces of Peru) is the foundation of all the subsequent histories of the events to which it refers.

This is the first English translation, by Thomas Nicholas, who also translated Francisco López de Gómara’s La conquista de Mexico. Nicholas was employed by the Levant Company in the Canary Islands and spent several years in prison there and in Spain for alleged heresy. On his release and return to England he published his translations of Spanish works which were probably written during his imprisonment.

1582–1600

Richard Hakluyt wrote and published his book, The principal navigations, voyages, traffiques and discoveries of the English nation. Hakluyt was a graduate of University of Oxford, where he later lectured on geography. He was a scholar, a collector and a fervent advocate of colonial expansion.

Hakluyt sincerely believed that England was obliged to carry the Protestant gospel to the Native American people. To enforce his argument, Hakluyt emphasized the advantages that England would receive if his demand for overseas colonies was met. His first book, Divers voyages touching the discoverie of America, published in 1582, introduced the English-speaking world to the discoveries made in North America by the Cabot's, Verrazano and Ribaut. In 1589, he compiled his principal navigations—this is the second, enlarged edition that was published in the following year. Hakluyt's second edition documents a life devoted to the promotion of English colonization and commerce, through an exploration of the less-known or recently discovered parts of the world. The publication has been called "the prose epic of the modern English nation". The third volume is solely concerned with America and Hakluyt gathered firsthand narratives of exploration for posterity—its importance in relation to English discovery and colonization in America has been stated.

1589

Walter Bigges' A summarie and true discourse of Sir Francis Drakes West Indian voyage is an account of Drake's expedition of 1585–86 against the Spaniards. The king of Spain had laid an embargo on all English ships and goods found in his country, and Elizabeth I had replied by letters of reprisal, and by ordering that a fleet of twenty-five sail be equipped "to revenge the wrongs offered her and to resist the king of Spain's preparations".

The first part of this work was written by Walter Bigges, a soldier officer; he died shortly after leaving Cartagena and the account was continued by Croftes, the lieutenant of Bigges' company. The expedition had been successful in that many Spanish settlements had been plundered and destroyed and a severe blow dealt to Spanish trade, but Croftes describes the difficulties faced by the English fleet, their sufferings from sickness, bad weather, and lack of water. It was only Drake's personal influence, courage and energy that kept them together. This was the voyage on which they brought into England, it is believed for the first time, tobacco and potatoes.

1596

In 1594, Sir Walter Raleigh, interested in the Spanish legend of the riches of the city of Manoa (Eldorado) in South America, sent out an expedition to Guiana (modern Venezuela). He sailed to Guiana himself the following year and in 1596, after his return to England, sent out a third expedition under Lawrence Keymis. Raleigh's final expedition to South America in 1617 resulted in armed conflict with the Spanish and this in turn led to his execution in 1618.

The discoverie of the large, rich, and bewtiful empyre of Guiana, written to refute those who claimed that Raleigh had never been to Guiana, is a storehouse of first-hand impressions and its influence can be traced in the works of Chapman, Shakespeare and Milton. It was an Elizabethan best-seller and the printer Robert Robinson produced no less than three editions of it in the year 1596.

1596

Nicolás Monardes' Joyfull newes out of the new-found worlde is a translation by John Frampton, a merchant who spent most of his life in Spain, of Monardes' Primera y segunda y tercera partes de la historia medicinal de las cosas que se traen de nuestras Indias occidentales qui sirven en medicinal, published in Seville in 1574.

Nicolas Monardes was one of the most distinguished Spanish physicians of his time. He studied medicine at Alcalá de Henares, where Cardinal Ximenez de Cisneros had founded schools of medicine and botany, and which was famous as a centre of medical research at a period when Spain had a high reputation in Europe as a leader of medical science.

At the time Monardes wrote his book he had been practising in Seville for forty years; new medicines, still untried in Europe, but by reputation in the Indies, possessing almost magical properties, were constantly being placed before him, with stories of their curative virtue and detailed accounts of their wonderful healing powers, plants and herbs which, according to the title page of the English edition, "bring such present remedie for all diseases, as may seeme altogether incredible: not withstanding by practice found out to be true."

Monardes was enthusiastic over the medical properties he thought inherent in tobacco and his account rapidly superseded that of Liébault whose work had hitherto been the chief source of information on the subject in Europe. Monardes made tobacco a household remedy throughout Western Europe and his gospel was accepted by the majority of European physicians for more than two centuries. Nowhere does he write of tobacco smoked by white men for pleasure

== See also ==
- Exploration of North America
