= Guillaume de Ferrières =

The Vidame as portrayed in the Chansonnier du Roi

Guillaume de Ferrières, Vidame de Chartres (c. 1150 – ?April 1204) was a French nobleman, probably the same person as the trouvère whose works are recorded only as by the Vidame de Chartres, his title. Eight songs in total have been attributed to the Vidame, though all but one with conflicting attributions to others. He is not to be confused with Raoul de Ferrières (fl. 1200–10), also a trouvère.

Guillaume took part in the Third (1188–92) and Fourth Crusades (1201–4), and died in Romania as part of the latter. A reference in the Vidame's song Combien que j'aie demouré to a forced sojourn in a "hated land" probably refers to Guillaume's stay in southwestern France in 1188, before the departure of the Crusade, while the leaders (Richard the Lionheart and Philip Augustus) were squabbling. Further evidence linking the trouvère with Guillaume includes a quotation of two stanzas of the Vidame's most popular song, Quant la saison du dous tens s'asseure, in the chivalric romance Guillaume de Dole, which was written probably in the 1220s. Quant la saison was, by implication, written some years prior. The rather garbled and uncertain melodies which accompany the Vidame's poems further support an early (pre-1200) date for the trouvère. One piece of evidence relating to the identity of the Vidame has not yet been adequately explained. The coat of arms with which the trouvère is depicted in his miniature portrait in the Chansonnier du Roi belonged mid-century to the Meslay family, who became vidames of Chartres only in 1224.

Only one of the eight songs variously attributed to the Vidame is not also ascribed to another. Only three, however, are regularly doubted to be his, and only one of these—Quant foillissent li boscage—is almost certainly not his. One of the remaining two, Desconsilliez plus que nus hom qui soit, which survives without music, is attributed in one manuscript to Li viscuens de Chartres (the viscount of Chartres), probably an error for vidame.

Five of the Vidame's songs are basically isometric and decasyllabic. The remaining three are heterometric but mainly octosyllabic. With the sole exception of Li plus desconfortés du mont, all his melodies are preserved in bar form and cover more than an octave in range each. Though most survive with modal structures, these vary from manuscript to manuscript and are unreliable.

== List of songs ==
Meslay family arms, assigned to the Vidame de Chartres in the Chansonnier du Roi Blazon: D'or, à deux fasces de sable, accompagné de neuf merlettes du même (3, 3 et 3)

- Chascuns me semont de chanter
- Combien que j'aie demouré
- D'amours vient joie et honours ensement
- Quant la saison du dous tens s'asseure
- Tant ai d'amours qu'en chantant m'estuet plaindre
- Tant con je fusse fors de ma contree

Doubtful works

- Desconsilliez plus que nus hom qui soit (no music)
- Li plus desconfortés du mont
- Quant foillissent li boscage
