= La Princesse de Clèves =

1678 novel attributed to Madame de La Fayette

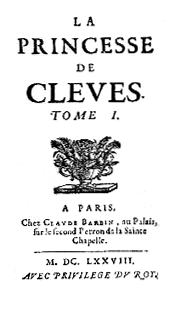
An Image of La Princesse de Clèves

La Princesse de Clèves (French pronunciation: [la pʁɛ̃sɛs də klɛv]; "The Princess of Cleves") is a French novel which was published anonymously in March 1678. It was regarded by many as the beginning of the modern tradition of the psychological novel and a classic work. Its author is generally held to be Madame de La Fayette.

The action takes place between October 1558 and November 1559 primarily at the royal court of Henry II of France, as well as in a few other locations in France. The novel recreates that era with remarkable precision. Nearly every character—though not the heroine—is a historical figure. Events and intrigues unfold with great faithfulness to the documentary record, and the novel is generally regarded as one of the first examples of Western historical fiction.

== Synopsis ==
Mademoiselle de Chartres is a sheltered heiress, sixteen years old, whose mother has brought her to the court of Henri II to seek a husband with good financial and social prospects. When old jealousies against a kinsman spark intrigues against the young ingénue, the best marriage prospects withdraw. The young woman follows her mother's recommendation and accepts the overtures of a middling suitor, the Prince de Clèves. After the wedding, she meets the dashing Duke de Nemours. The two fall in love, yet do nothing to pursue their affections, limiting their contact to an occasional visit in the now-Princess of Clèves's salon.

The duke becomes enmeshed in a scandal at court that leads the Princess to believe he has been unfaithful in his affections. A letter from a spurned mistress to her paramour is discovered in the dressing room at one of the estates, but this letter was actually written to the Princess' uncle, the Vidame de Chartres, who has also become entangled in a relationship with the Queen. He begs the Duke de Nemours to claim ownership of the letter, which ends up in the Princess's possession. The duke has to produce documents from the Vidame to convince the Princess that his heart has been true.

Eventually, the Prince de Clèves discerns that his wife is in love with another man. She confesses as much. He relentlessly quizzes her—indeed tricks her—until she reveals the man's identity. After he sends a servant to spy on the Duke de Nemours, the Prince de Clèves believes that his wife has been both physically and emotionally unfaithful to him. He becomes ill and dies (of his illness and of a broken heart). On his deathbed, he blames the Duke de Nemours for his suffering and begs the Princess not to marry him.

Now free to pursue her passions, the Princess is torn between her duty and her love. The duke pursues her more openly, but she rejects him, choosing instead to enter a convent for part of each year.

== Characters ==
- Mademoiselle de Chartres / Madame de Clèves / The Princess of Clèves – The Princess at the center of the story. The daughter of Madame de Chartres and the niece of the Vidame de Chartres, she struggles throughout the novel with her duty as a wife to Monsieur de Clèves and her love for the Duke de Nemours.
- Madame de Chartres – The mother of the Princess of Clèves. She supports her daughter's marriage to Monsieur de Clèves and warns her daughter against a romantic attachment to the Duke de Nemours. Her death leaves the Princess without a confidante advising restraint.
- Monsieur de Clèves / The Prince of Clèves – The husband of the Princess de Clèves. He has "prudence rare in the young" and, although he lacks the beauty and style of the Duke de Nemours, has financial stability and high stature at court. Madame de Chartres views him as an attractive match for her daughter. While the Princess feels affection for him, Monsieur de Clèves loves her so profoundly that learning of her feelings for the Duke de Nemours wounds him beyond measure. In reality, Cleves was a duchy, not a principality. Anne of Cleves was Queen of England in 1540 and died in 1557, immediately before the events of the novel.
- Monsieur de Nemours / The Duke of Nemours – The dashing "chef d’oeuvre de la nature" with whom the Princess de Clèves falls in love. His obsession with the Princess leads him, despite the fact she is married, to make many advances. The Duke at the time of Henri II was Jacques of Savoy.
- The King Henri II – The King of France. This character is believed to be a representation of King Louis XIV.
- Diane de Poitiers, the king's mistress.
- Mary, Queen of Scots, la Reine Dauphine, married to the Dauphin.
- Chevalier de Guise – A young knight who loves the Princess de Clèves.
- Madame de Tournon – A lady of the court who has affairs with two men, Estouteville and the Count de Sancerre.
- Vidame de Chartres – The uncle of the Princess de Clèves and a friend of the Duke de Nemours. The Duke often uses the Vidame as a way to contact the Princesse. The Vidame de Chartres at the time of Henri II was François de Vendôme.

== Contemporary reception ==
The novel was an enormous commercial success at the time of its publication, and readers outside of Paris had to wait months to receive copies. The novel also sparked several public debates, including one about its authorship, and another about the wisdom of the Princess's decision to confess her adulterous feelings to her husband.

One of the earliest psychological novels, and also the first roman d'analyse (analysis novel), La Princesse de Clèves marked a major turning point in the history of the novel, which to that point had largely been used to tell romances, implausible stories of heroes overcoming odds to find a happy marriage, with a myriad of subplots and running up to twelve volumes. La Princesse de Clèves turned that on its head with a highly realistic plot, introspective language that explored the characters' inner thoughts and emotions, and few but important subplots concerning the lives of other nobles.

=== List of English translations ===
- Anonymous (Bentley and Magnes, 1679) – "Rendered into English by a Person of Quality".
- Thomas Sergeant Perry (James R. Osgood, McIlvaine & Co., 1892) – revised by John D. Lyons (Norton Critical Editions, 1993).
- H. Ashton (George Routledge & Sons Ltd, c.1925).
- Nancy Mitford (Euphorion Books, 1950) – revised by Leonard Tancock (Penguin Classics, 1978).
- Walter J. Cobb (Signet Classic, 1961).
- Mildred Sarah Greene (University of Mississippi, Romance Monographs, no. 35, 1979).
- Terence Cave (Oxford World's Classics, 1992).
- Robin Buss (Penguin Classics, 1992).
- David Harrison (Lever Press, 2022), co-edited with Hélène Bilis, Jean-Vincent Blanchard, and Hélène Visentin

== In popular culture ==
The novel was the basis of Jean Delannoy's 1961 film of the same title (adapted by Jean Cocteau), Manoel de Oliveira's 1999 film The Letter, and Andrzej Żuławski's 2000 film Fidelity (starring Sophie Marceau).

Beginning in 2006, before he became the French president, Nicolas Sarkozy denigrated the book, arguing that it was ridiculous that civil service entrance exams included questions on La Princesse de Clèves. As a result, during the long movement of university lecturers in 2009 against his proposals, public readings of La Princesse de Clèves were held in towns around the country. Sales of the novel rose rapidly.

In relation to this, the novel is used by French filmmaker Christophe Honoré for his 2008 film La Belle Personne. The plot of the film roughly follows that of the novel, but changes the setting to that of a modern-day French lycée (high school), thus referencing both the novel and the reason for its contemporary fame.

The novel was dramatised as a radio play directed by Kirsty Williams broadcast on BBC Radio 3 on 28 February 2010 – see La Princesse de Clèves (radio play). It was also the basis of Régis Sauder's 2011 film Nous, princesses de Clèves, in which teenagers in an inner city school are studying the novel for their baccalaureate exam.

== Illustrations ==
Illustrations by Sergey Solomko (1925)
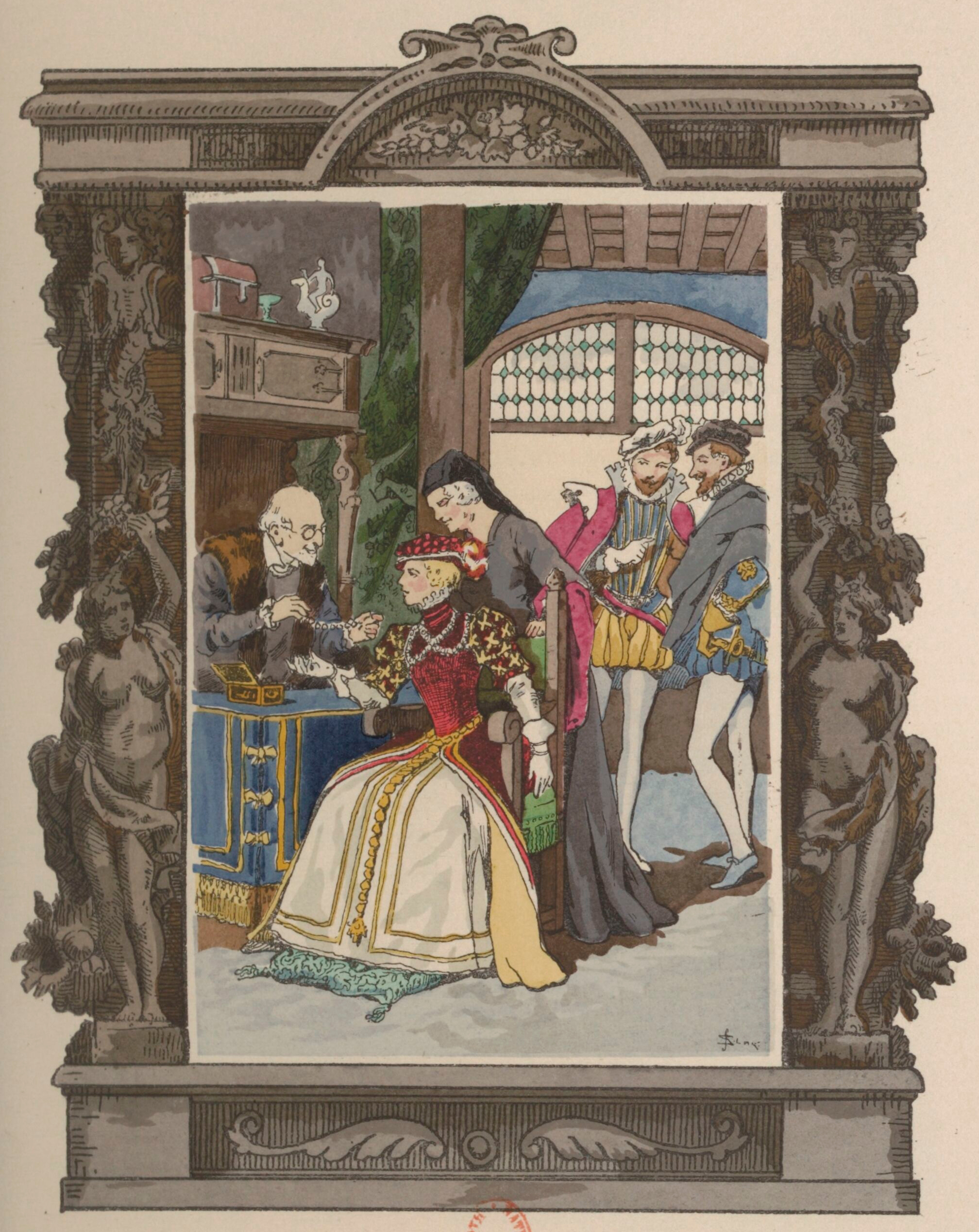
Prince de Clèves sees Mademoiselle de Chartres at the jeweler's shop (Part I)

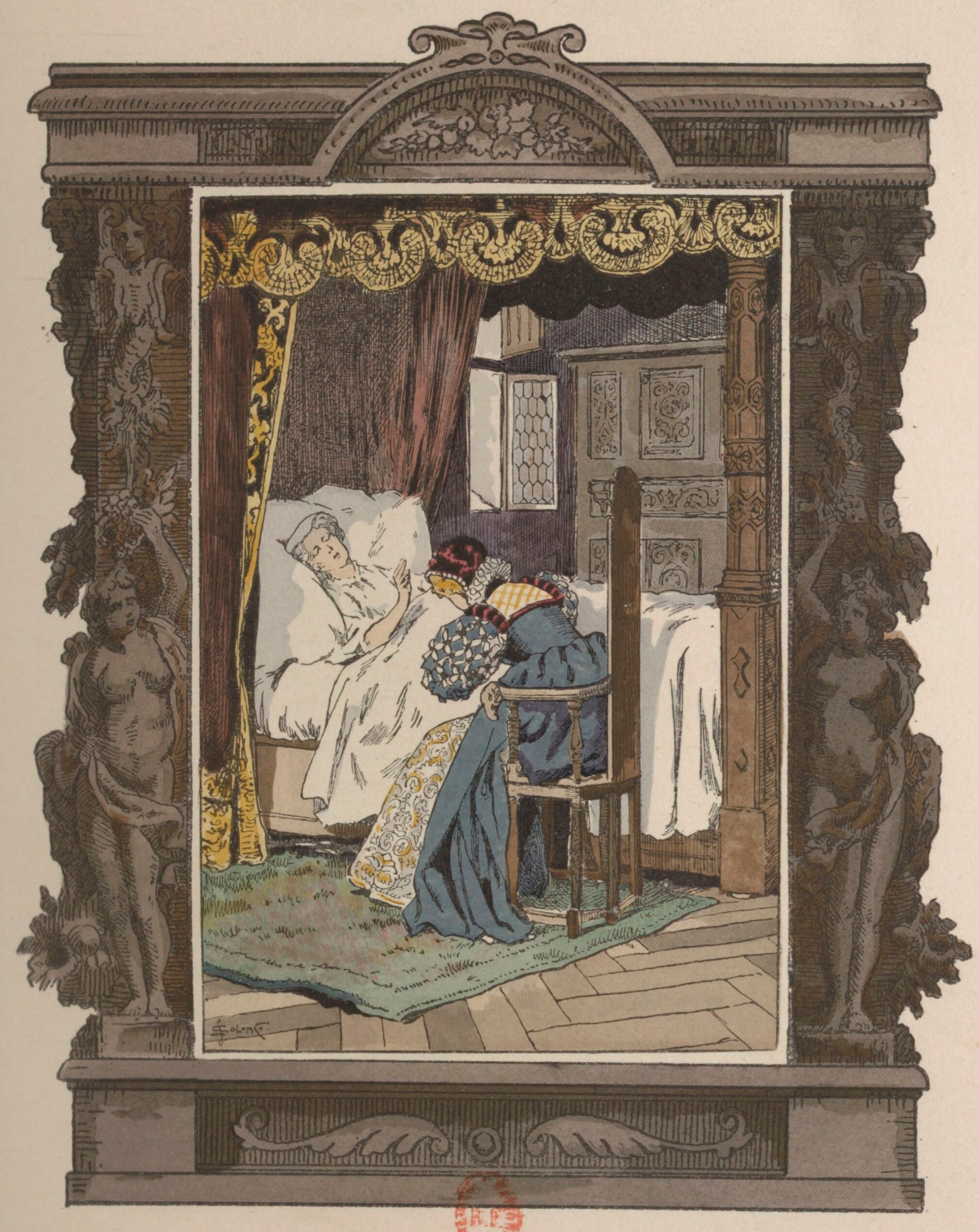
Madame de Chartres warns the Princess de Clèves against a romantic attachment to the Duke de Nemours (Part I)

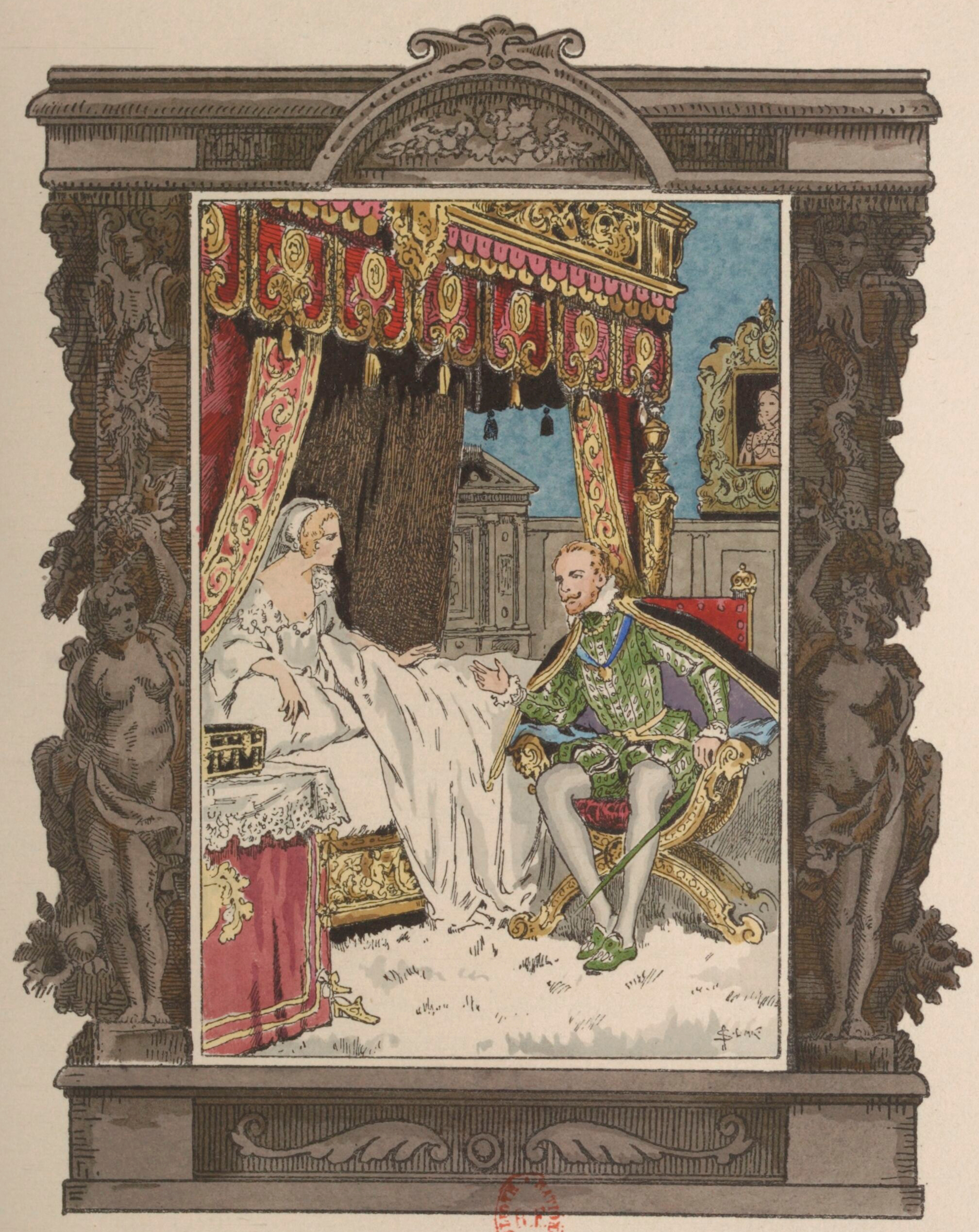
The Duke de Nemours speaks privately to the Princess de Clèves (Part II)

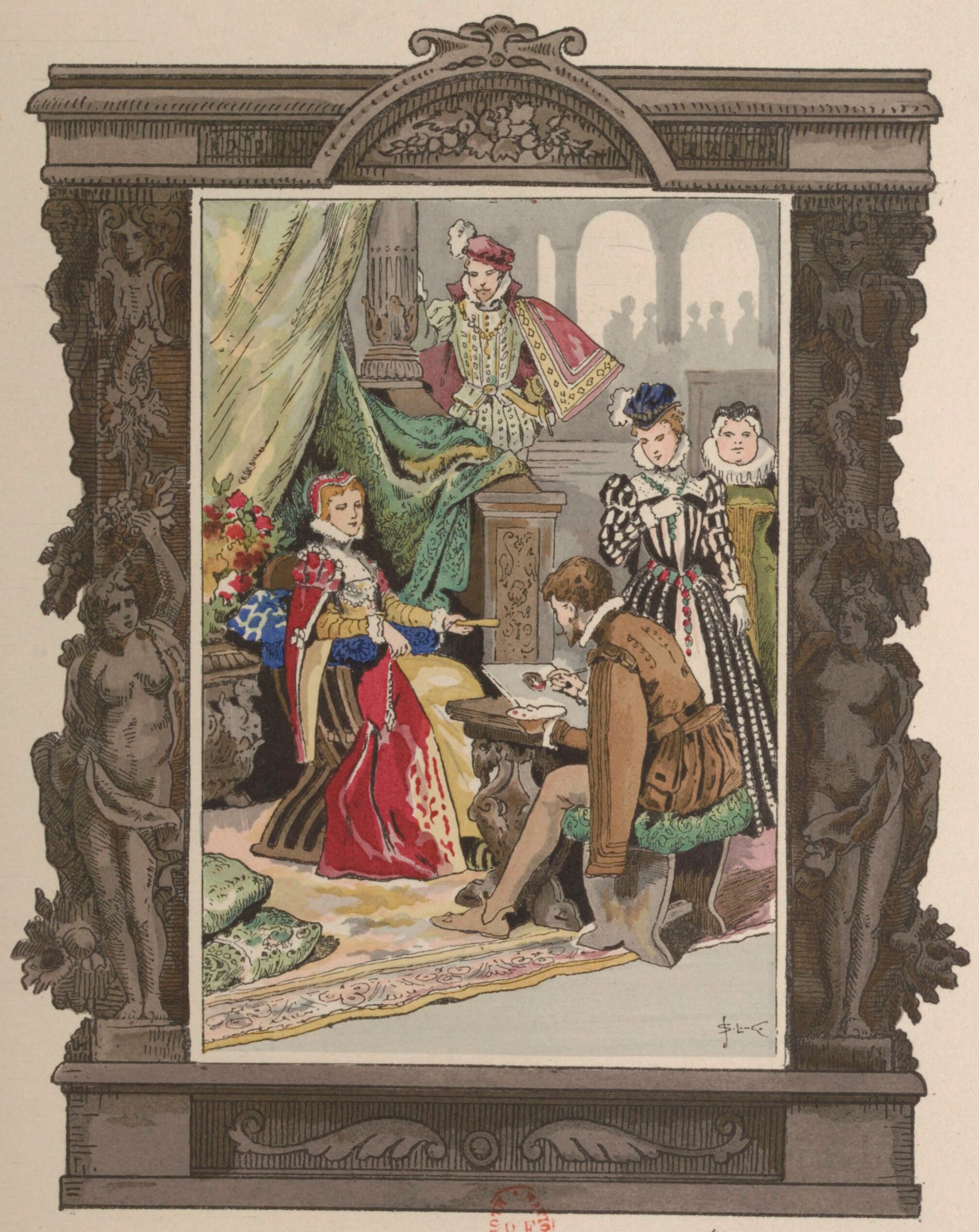
An artist is painting a portrait of the Princess de Clèves. The Duke de Nemours stands in the background (Part II)

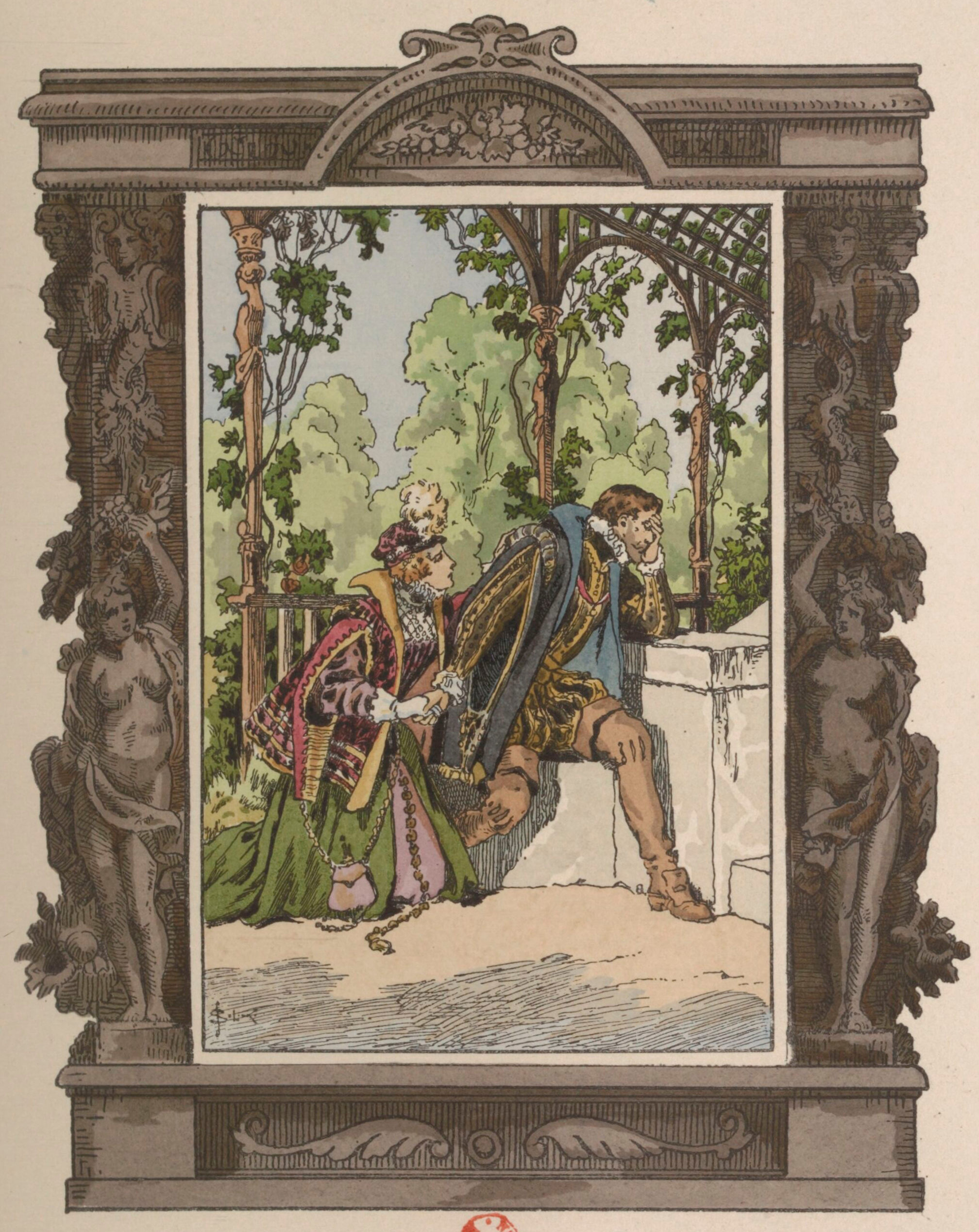
The Princess de Clèves confesses to her husband her love to the Duke de Nemours (Part III)

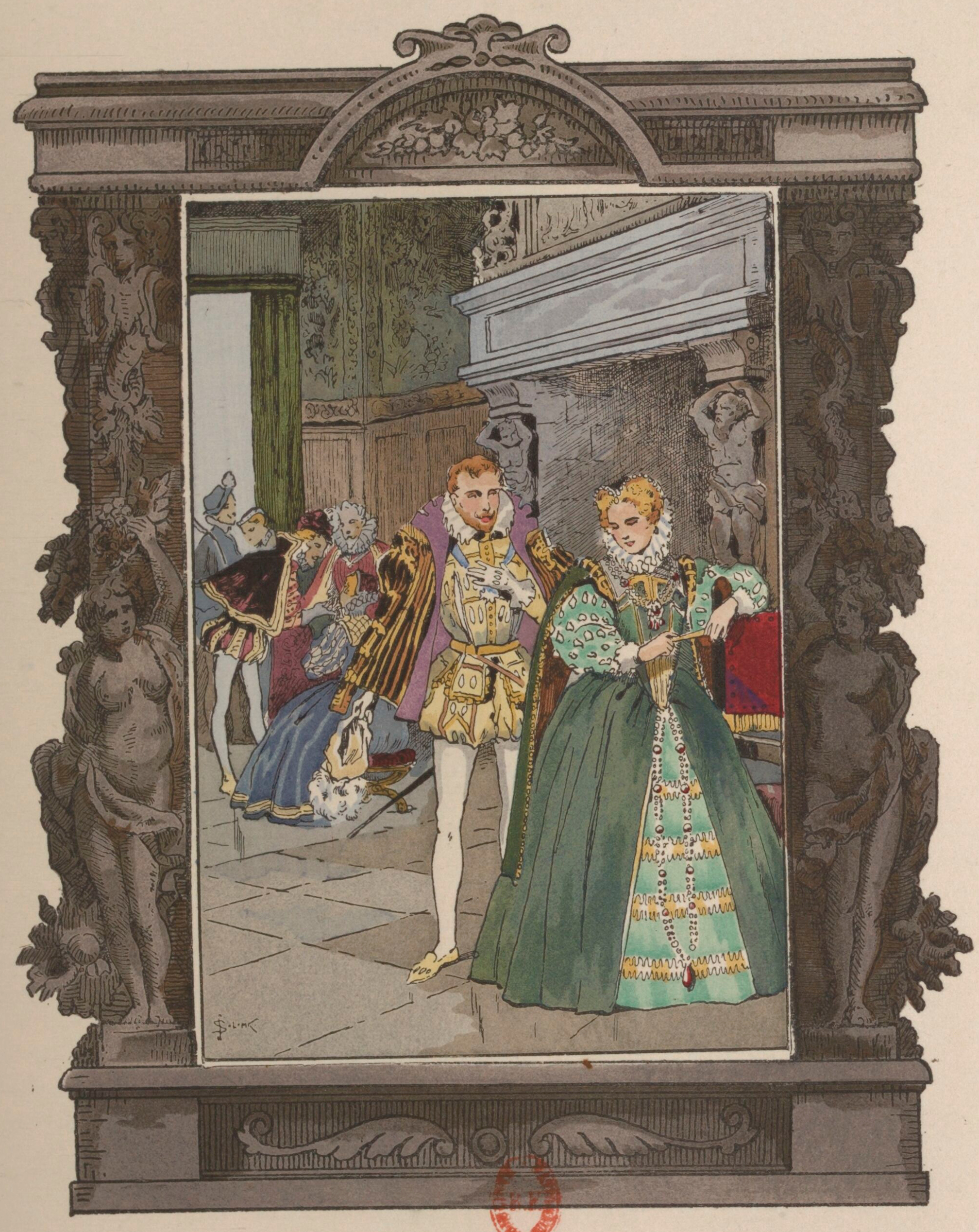
The Duke de Nemours speaks to the Princess de Clèves in the salon of Madame la Dauphine (Part III)

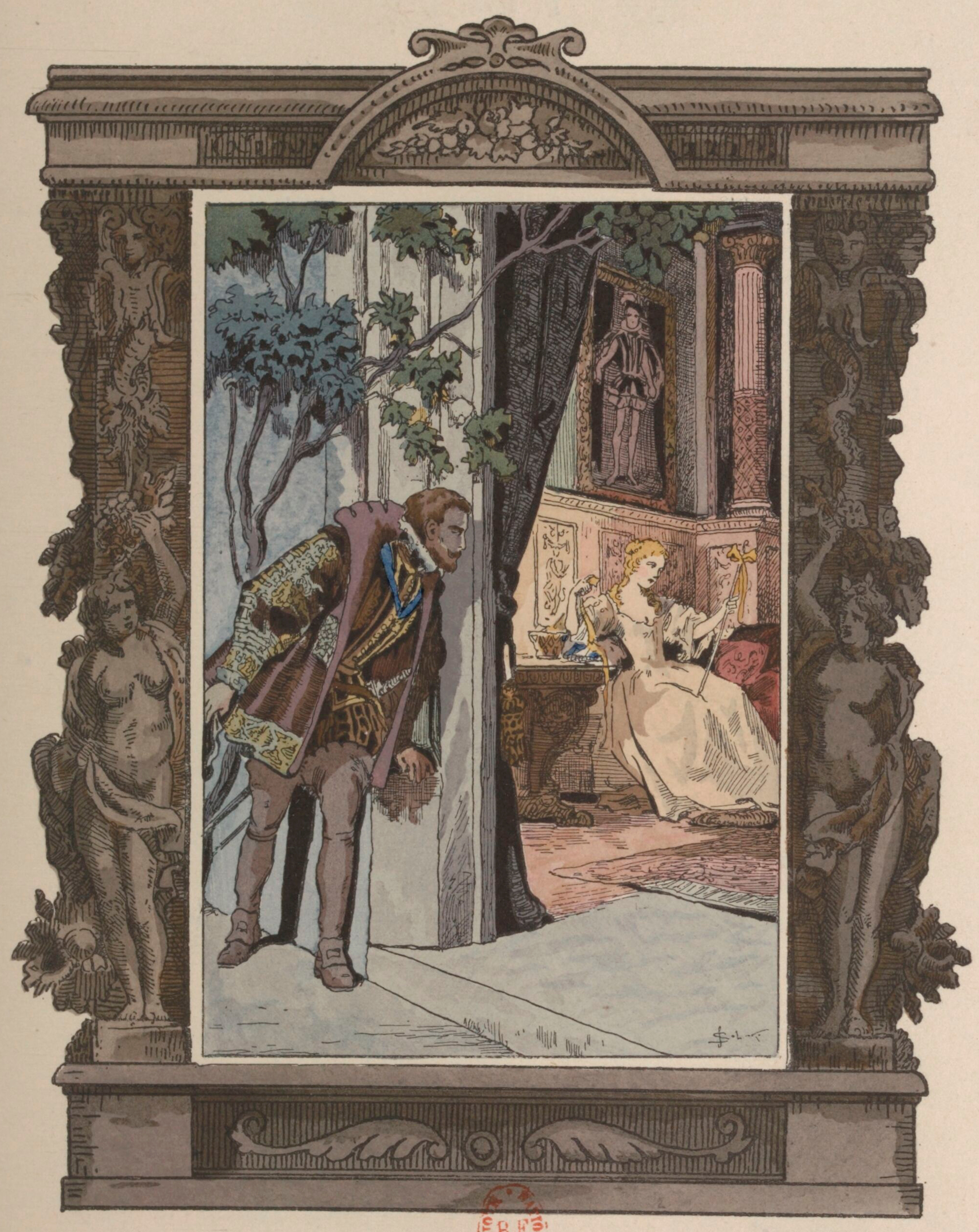
The Duke of Nemours watches the Princess de Clèves alone at Coulommiers (Part IV)

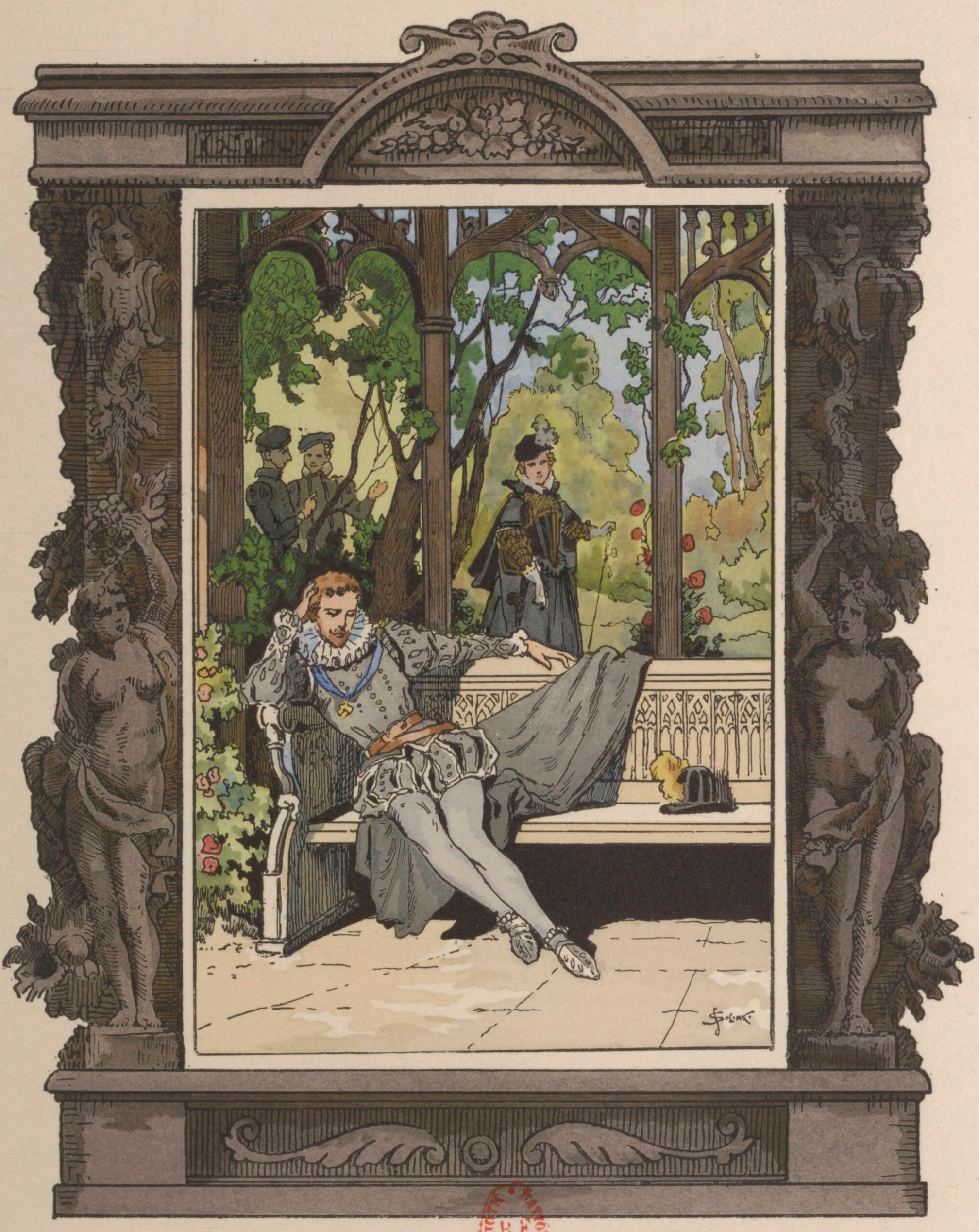
The Princess de Clèves and the Duke de Nemours on the banket, not seeing her (Part IV)
