= Jean de Ferrières =

Jean de Ferrières, Vidame de Chartres
- Born: 1520
- Died: 1586 (aged 65–66)
- Spouse: Françoise Joubert
- Father: François de Ferrières
- Mother: Louise de Vendôme

Jean de Ferrières (1520–1586), Vidame de Chartres, Seigneur de Maligny, was an influential Huguenot in the French Wars of Religion in the 16th century. He died a prisoner in a galley, unable to pay his ransom, and was succeeded by his nephew, Pregent de La Fin.

== Family ==
Jean de Ferrières, Vidame de Chartres, was the grandson of Jean de Ferrières (died 1497), who had been twice married, firstly to Marguerite de Bourbon (d. before February 1482), illegitimate daughter of John II, Duke of Bourbon (d. April 1488), by whom he had two sons who died without issue, and secondly to Marie de Damas, Dame de Maligny, by whom he had an elder son, Philippe de Ferrières, who inherited the Ferrières lands, and a younger son, François de Ferrières (died 1544), who inherited the Maligny lands, and in 1516 married Louise de Vendôme (d. by 1553), despite the strong opposition of her brother, Louis de Vendôme (d. 22 August 1526). François de Ferrières (died 1544) who was chamberlain to Charles, Duke of Bourbon, and Louise de Vendôme, who was maid of honour to Anne de Beaujeu, Duchess of Bourbon, had two sons and five daughters:

- Jean de Ferrières (1520–1586), the subject of this article.
- Edme de Maligny (1540–1586), known as 'le jeune Maligny', who participated in the Amboise conspiracy, and drowned at Geneva in 1560.
- Beraude de Maligny (d. 3 September 1618), Maid of Honour to Jeanne d'Albret, Queen of Navarre, who married firstly Dieudonne de Barratz or Bascaz (d. 6 June 1553), Seigneur de Bedeuil, and secondly, on 17 April 1559, Jean de La Fin (died 1599), Seigneur de Beauvoir-la-Nocle, by whom she was the mother of Pregent de La Fin (d. August 1624), who succeeded his uncle and was the last Vidame of Chartres of the Ferrières family.
- Catherine, Françoise, Christine and Claude, all of whom entered the religious life.

== Career ==
=== Early life, disinheritance ===
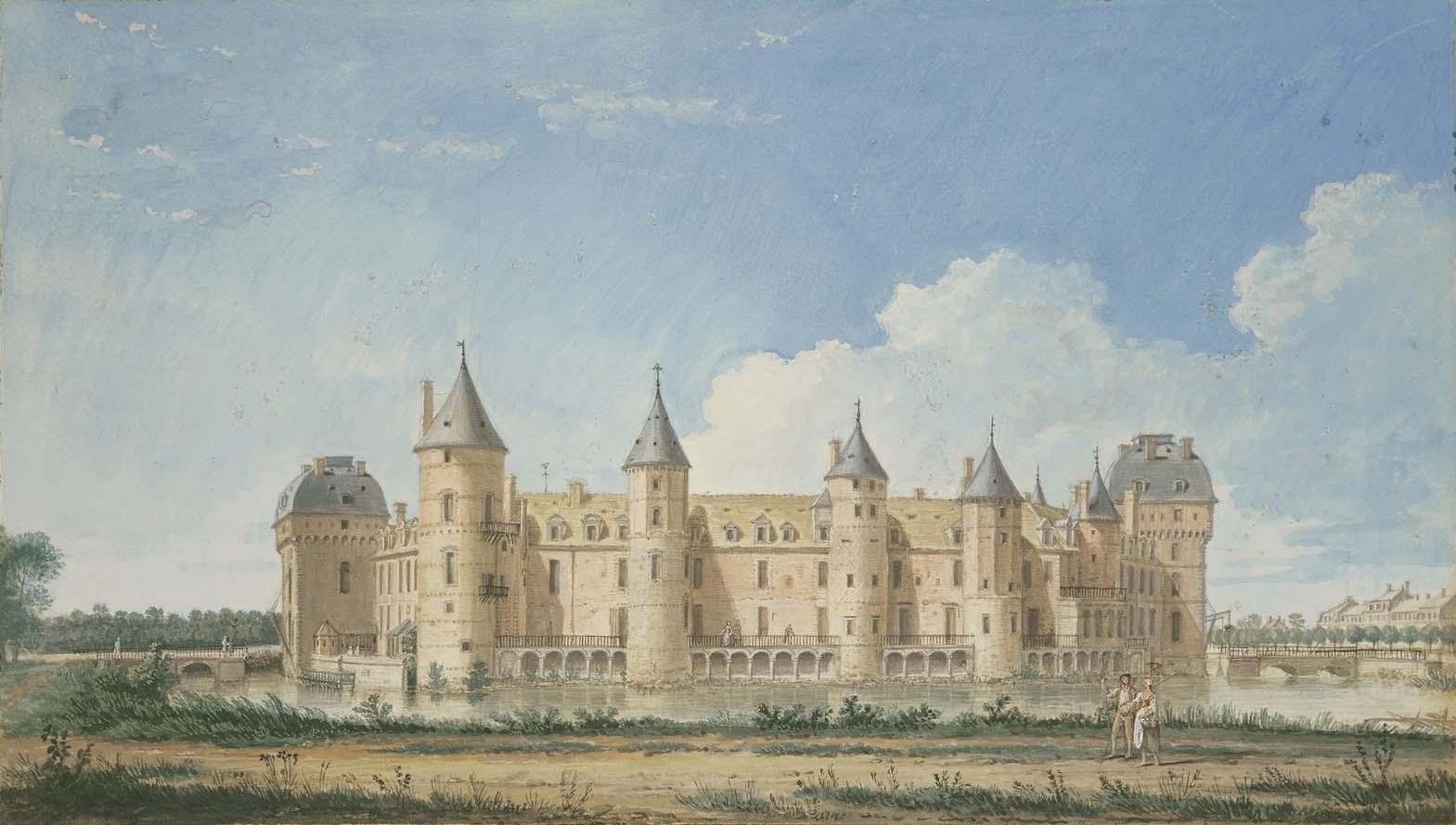
Depiction of one of the Vidame's residences, the Château de la Ferté Vidame, before 1750

In February 1538 Jean de Ferrières was given two benefices by his father. Less than two years later, however, he was disinherited by both his father and mother when they made their joint last wills on 23 December 1539. Although the reason for his disinheritance is unknown, d'Estang suggests that it may have been due to his abandonment of the Catholic religion.

=== Ambassador in Italy ===
In November 1549 he travelled to Rome in the suite of Henri II's ambassador in ordinary, Claude d'Urfé (d. 12 November 1558) for the papal conclave of 1549 to 1550 after the death of Pope Paul III. In 1553 he accompanied his first cousin, François de Vendôme, Vidame de Chartres (d. 22 December 1560), the then Vidame de Chartres, to Metz, which was under siege by the English. In 1557 he travelled to Piedmont.

=== Inheritance of 'immense riches' ===
In 1560 de Ferrières' cousin François was imprisoned in the Bastille after having fallen out with the powerful Guise family. He died on 22 December 1560 without legitimate issue, and despite the fact that Ferrières was his heir, did not mention him in his will. Petigny suggests that this might have been an act of prudence on Vendôme's part, considering the enemies he had made and the circumstances of his imprisonment. Ferrières inherited from his cousin both 'immense riches' and the title of Vidame de Chartres (formerly bishops including those of Reims, Amiens, Mans, Laon and Chartres had a vidame as his principal lay officer, but by the 16th century the title had become merely hereditary). According to Arber, because of concerns about what steps his enemies might take if he were to administer his inheritance himself, Ferrières made a secret agreement with his sister Beraude, that she would present herself as Vendôme's sole heir.

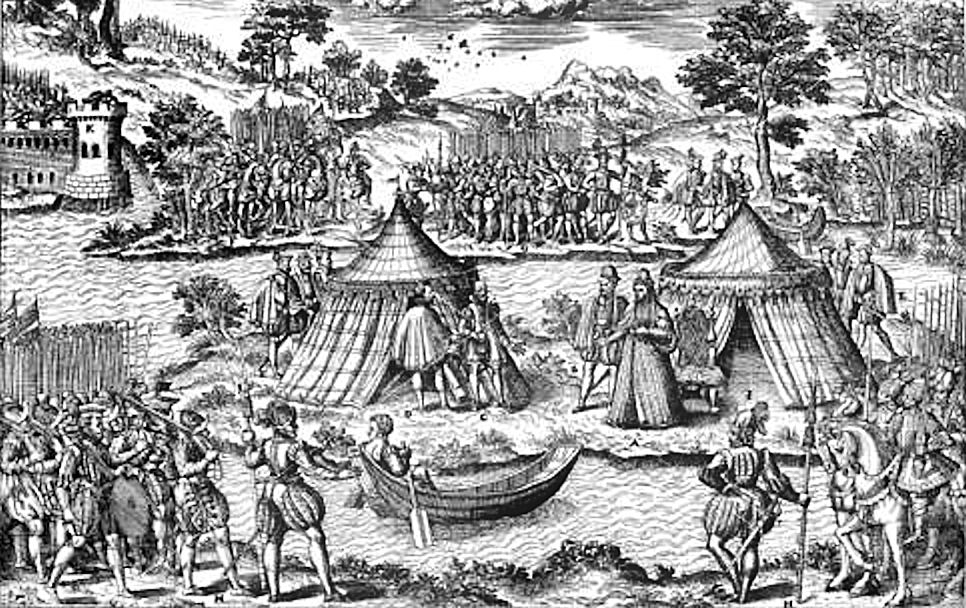
Depiction of Peace of Amboise, 1563

=== French Wars of Religion ===
Work as an ambassador from the Huguenots to England

When civil war broke out in France over religious issues, the Protestant leader, Louis, Prince de Condé, sent Ferrières and the Seigneurs de Saint Aubin and de la Haye to England to persuade Elizabeth I to join the Huguenot resistance to the Catholic party. The French ambassadors arrived in England about 15 August 1562, and after numerous secret conferences with English officials, signed the Treaty of Hampton Court on 20 September 1562. An extant copy of the treaty bears Ferrières' signature.

It was at this time that Richard Eden joined Ferrières' service as a secretary, according to Arber because he was an 'excellent linguist'. Ferrières, Eden, and 3000 English soldiers under the command of Sir Adrian Poynings sailed from Portsmouth on 2 October, arriving at Le Havre, then called by the English Newhaven, two days later. On 11 November a warrant authorized that a pension of £300 be paid to Ferrières in quarterly instalments. By 29 July 1563 a large part of the English force at Le Havre had been slain in action or had died of the plague, forcing the surrender of the town to the French. The survivors returned to England, bringing the plague with them.

Peace, continued persecution

The French civil war came to a temporary end on 19 March 1563 with the Edict of Pacification signed at Amboise, which granted the Huguenots certain religious freedoms. However Ferrières' goods were confiscated by the French crown on the ground of his responsibility for bringing English forces to Le Havre. From 23 March 1564 Charles IX of France, his mother, Catherine de' Medici, and the rest of French court were at Troyes, where Ferrières and the Prince de Condé joined them on 8 April, receiving a 'simulated welcome'. Ferrières left the royal progress at Vitry on 27 April, and joined the Prince de Condé in Paris, where he apparently resided for the next several years. Richard Eden's own account states that he travelled to various places in Germany, including Strasbourg, and according to Arber it is likely that Eden accompanied Ferrières on those journeys.

In 1567 Ferrières recommended to Sir William Cecil a Frenchman, Pierre Briet, and a Fleming, Jean Carre, who wrote to Cecil on 9 August 1567 requesting permission to 'erect glassworks similar to those of Venice'.

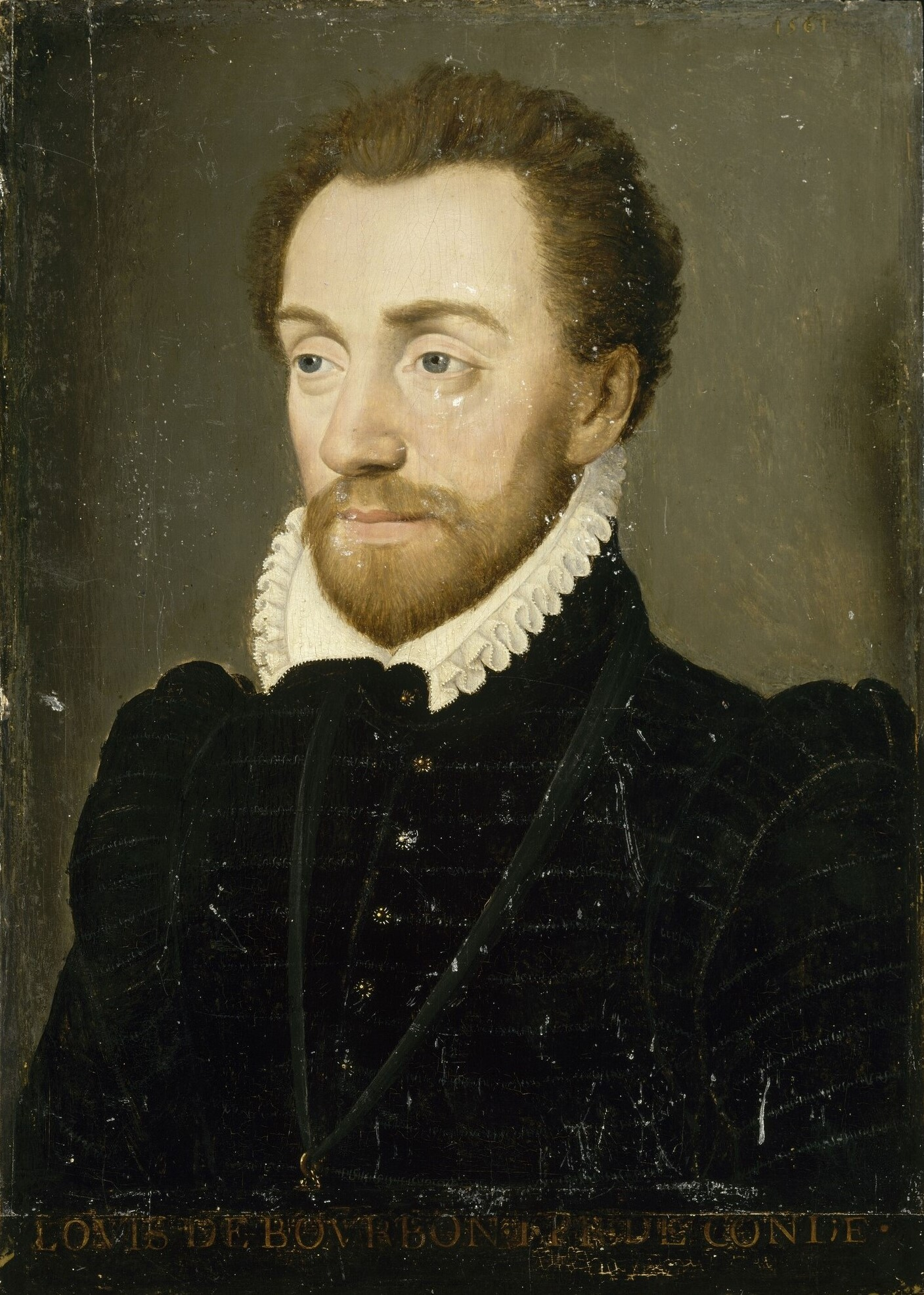
De Ferrières' associate in the French Wars of Religion, the Prince de Condé

Exile in England

After the Prince de Condé was slain at the Battle of Jarnac on 13 March 1569, Ferrières and his wife, Françoise Joubert, left France, arriving in Cornwall on 28 April 1569. Ferrières was received by the Queen at Greenwich Palace on 8 July. On 23 September of that year, by decree of the French Parliament, he was burnt in effigy, for the second time within a year, at the Place de Grève in Paris.

On 4 November 1569 Ferrières wrote from Holborn in London to Cecil recommending Giovanni Battista Agnello as 'a man of honesty and industry'. With his letter he sent Cecil a copy of Agnello's book, saying that he wished it had been printed on cleaner paper, 'but that of dusky hue best suits the works of Vulcanicorum hominum'. The book which de Ferrières enclosed with his letter was Agnello's Espositione di Giouanbatista Agnello Venetiano sopra vn libro intitolato Apocalypsis spiritus secreti, published in London in 1566 as only the second book in Italian printed in England. The original work was an eight-page book in Latin, which Agnello had translated into Italian and elaborated with his own commentary. According to Linden, Agnello's purpose in the work was to explain the world soul in alchemical terms. Agnello's connection to Ferrières is not known, nor why he chose to recommend him to Cecil.

On 24 January 1570, Elizabeth I wrote to her farmers of customs duties, advising that permission had been granted to Ferrières to import wine into England free of duty for his personal use.

Three years in France, return to exile

In October 1570, as a result of the Peace of Saint Germain, Ferrières was able to return to Paris. After some of his servants were attacked there, he went to Boubige in Poitou. In February 1572 he was at La Ferté, but shortly thereafter returned to Paris, where he remained in the Faubourg Saint-Germain, mistrusting the King's promises for the safety of the Huguenots. After an attempted assassination of Admiral Gaspard de Coligny, Ferrières took the King to task for the 'cowardice' of the attack, and the following day urged that the Admiral, and all Protestants, should leave Paris. His advice was ignored, and the St Bartholomew's Day Massacre occurred that night. Ferrières, his brother-in-law, Jean de La Fin, and ten others, including according to Arber, Richard Eden, escaped, fleeing first to La Ferté, and from thence to the coast where they found a ship to take them to England. Ferrières arrived in London on 7 September 1573.

In July 1573 Elizabeth I had already authorized a further warrant, similar to that which had been issued on 11 November 1562, granting payment of £300 quarterly to Ferrières.

Richard Eden had remained in Ferrières' service until 1572, travelling extensively with him in France and Germany. In September 1573 Ferrières wrote to the Queen requesting that Eden be admitted as one of her Poor Knights of Windsor.

Final return to France, death

Ferrières returned to France, and in 1581, by then heavily in debt, joined the King of Navarre, the future Henri IV of France, in Gascony, and was named by him commander of Casteljaloux, an office which he fulfilled until January 1584. He then went to Saintonge, and despite his age engaged in conflict there between Protestant and Catholic forces. The galleys of a certain Captain Carles were making frequent sorties against the Ile d'Oléron, in the course of which battles Ferrières was captured in 1586 by Catholic forces and handed over to Carles, who demanded a heavy ransom which Ferrières was unable to pay. In consequence Carles allowed Ferrières, at the age of about sixty-six, 'to die like a dog while bound to the magazine at the bottom of the hold of the captain's galley'.
