= La Ferté-Vidame =

- Commune
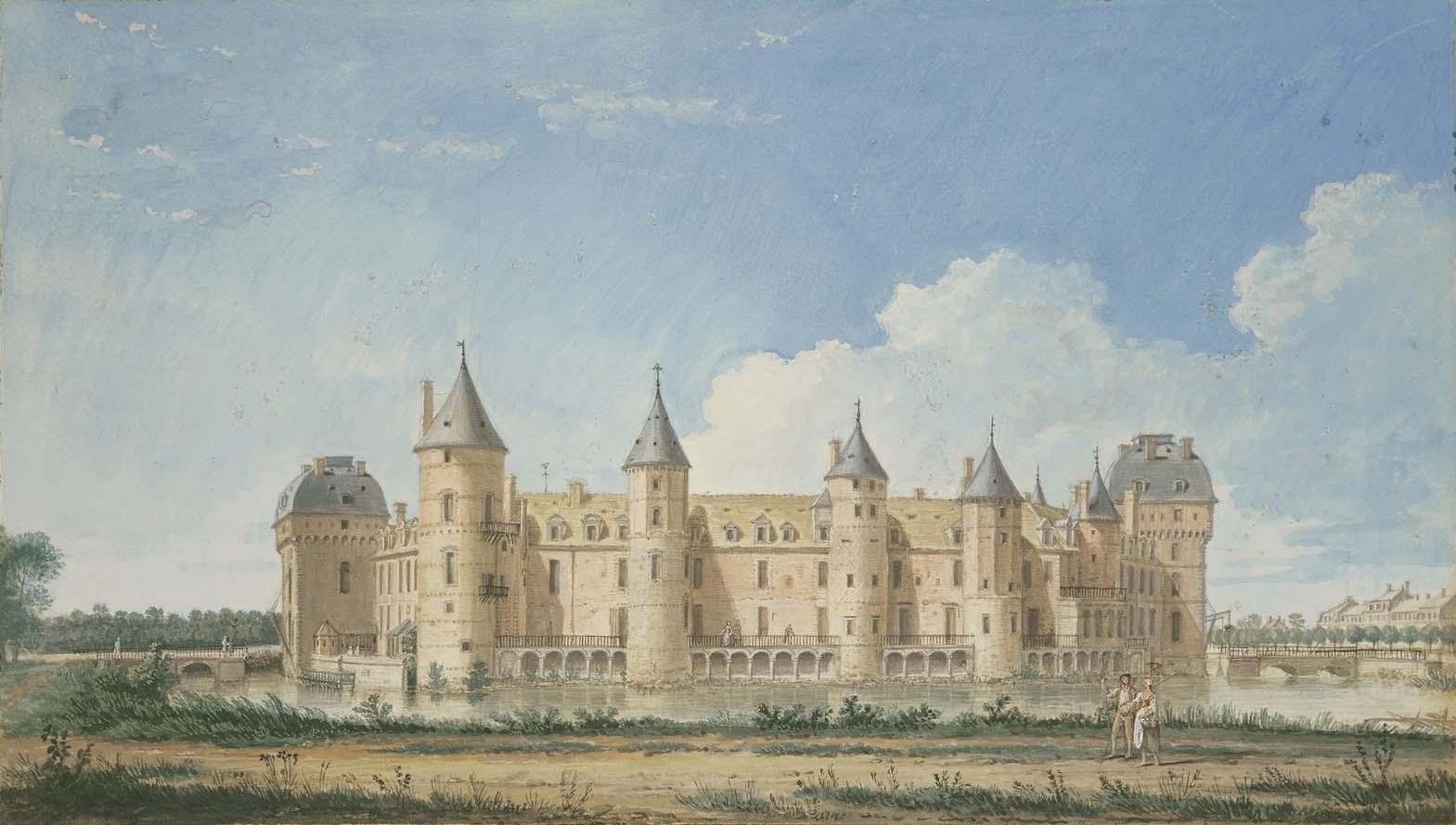
- View of Ferté-Vidame castle, before 1750, Louis-Nicolas van Blarenberghe

- Coat of arms
- Location of La Ferté-Vidame
- Location within France Location within Centre-Val de Loire
- Coordinates: 48°36′30″N 00°53′59″E
- Country: France
- Region: Centre-Val de Loire
- Department: Eure-et-Loir
- Arrondissement: Dreux
- Canton: Saint-Lubin-des-Joncherets

Government
  - Mayor (2020–2026): Catherine Stroh
- Area^{1}: 39.81 km^{2} (15.37 sq mi)
- Elevation: 246 m (807 ft)
- Highest elevation: 286 m (938 ft)
- Lowest elevation: 214 m (702 ft)
- Population (2023): 543
  - Density: 13.6/km^{2} (35.3/sq mi)
- Time zone: UTC+01:00 (CET)
  - Summer (DST): UTC+02:00 (CEST)
- INSEE/Postal code: 28149 /28340
- ^{1} French Land Register data, which excludes lakes, ponds, glaciers > 1 km^{2} (0.386 sq mi or 247 acres) and river estuaries.

La Ferté-Vidame (French pronunciation: [la fɛʁte vidam]) is a commune in the Eure-et-Loir department in northern France.

== Geography ==
The Commune along with another 70 communes shares part of a 47,681 hectare, Natura 2000 conservation area, called the Forêts et étangs du Perche.

== History ==
The title of vidame of Chartres was, under the Ancien Régime, attached to the lands of [La] Ferté-Arnault. Among the famous men to bear the title Vidame de Chartres were François de Vendôme, Vidame de Chartres, the English soldier Thomas de Scales, 7th Baron Scales (d. 1460), Jean de Ferrieres, and the memoirist Louis de Rouvroy, duc de Saint-Simon. The château was Saint-Simon's main country house. Until shortly before the French Revolution the seigneur was Jean-Joseph de Laborde, an ennobled business man with progressive views, who was to be guillotined in 1794.

In July 2019 a collector’s gathering was held at La Ferté for Citroën to mark the company's 100th anniversary. The event spread over one weekend and showed over 8,000 cars with nearly 100,000 people in attendance.

== Castle ==
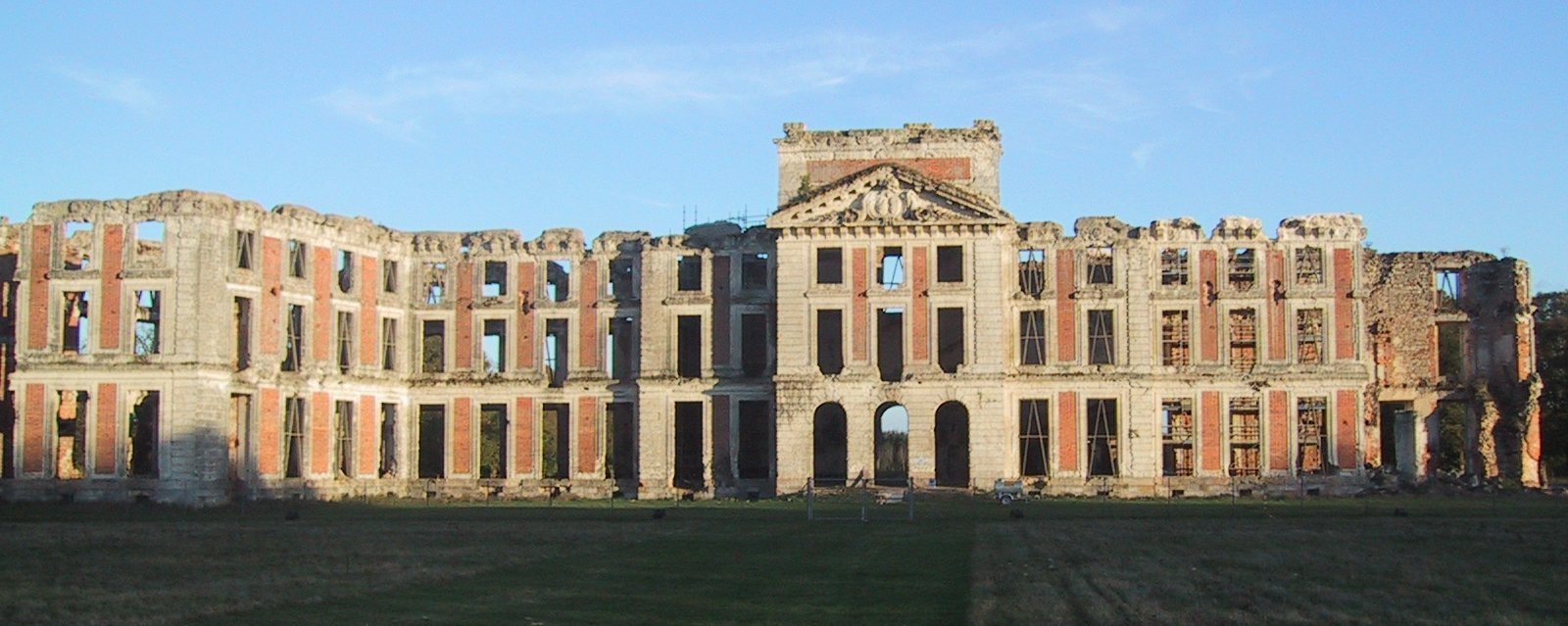
The ruins of the Château de la Ferté-Vidame in 2005

The Château de la Ferté-Vidame was substantially rebuilt by the architect Antoine Matthieu Le Carpentier in 1771. It is now a roofless shell.

At the Bourbon Restoration, it was restituted to the duchess of Orléans, as the closest relative of her father Louis Jean Marie de Bourbon, Duke of Penthièvre, the owner before the French Revolution. On her death in 1821, the domaine passed to her eldest son Louis-Philippe I, future king of the French. He reconstituted the domaine, rebuilt its fortified wall, repaired its water features and restored and expanded the small château, though the restoration was interrupted by the Revolution of 1848.

== Population ==
Historical population
Year	Pop.	±% p.a.
1968	793	—
1975	790	−0.05%
1982	784	−0.11%
1990	801	+0.27%
1999	818	+0.23%
2007	782	−0.56%
2012	684	−2.64%
2017	700	+0.46%
2023	543	−4.14%
Source: INSEE

== See also ==
- Natural region of Thymerais
- List of châteaux in Eure-et-Loir
- Communes of the Eure-et-Loir department
