= Beare Sound =

Arctic waterway in Qikiqtaaluk, Nunavut, Canada

- Location within Nunavut
- Coordinates: 62°31′N 065°14′W
- Basin countries: Canada
- Settlements: uninhabited

Beare Sound or Beares Sound is an Arctic waterway in Qikiqtaaluk, Nunavut, Canada. It is located in eastern Frobisher Bay off the southern tip of Baffin Island's Blunt Peninsula.

Martin Frobisher named the sound after James Beare, principal surveyor of the 1577/78 Frobisher expedition.
