= George Beare =

George Beare may refer to:

- George Beare (footballer) (1885–1970), English footballer
- George Beare (painter) (died 1749), English painter
