= Richard Eden (translator) =

English alchemist and translator (c.1520–1576)

Richard Eden (c. 1520 – 1576) was an English alchemist and translator. His translations of the geographical works of other writers helped to foster enthusiasm for overseas exploration in Tudor England.

== Early life ==
Richard Eden, the son of a cloth merchant, attended Christ's College, Cambridge and then Queens' College, graduating BA in 1538 and MA in 1544. As a protégé of Sir Thomas Smith, Eden associated with intellectuals such as John Cheke and Roger Ascham and served in a minor Treasury position from 1544 to 1546.

From the late 1540s, Eden worked for Richard Whalley, who would be Sheriff of Nottinghamshire in 1595. He was paid £20 per annum as he sought the secret of turning base metal into gold.

Eden set out to translate Vannoccio Biringuccio's De la pirotechnia into English and had completed the first 22 chapters in 1552, but he made the mistake of lending out the manuscript and was unable to retrieve it. However, he included a translation of its first three chapters in his Decades of the new worlde of 1555, although he omitted Biringuccio's attack on alchemists.

== Overseas exploration ==
The new protector, the Earl of Northumberland, wishing to challenge Spain's global empire and open up the Far East to European trade, spurred publications that helped to encourage this. Under his direction, Eden in 1552 became secretary to Sir William Cecil and in 1553 published A Treatyse of the Newe India, translating part of Sebastian Muenster's Cosmographia.

In 1555, Eden's The Decades of the Newe Worlde or West India translated the works of others, including some of Pietro Martire d'Anghiera's De orbe novo decades and Natural hystoria de las Indias from Gonzalo Fernández de Oviedo y Valdés. In 1561 he translated Martín Cortés de Albacar's Arte de navigar as The Arte of Navigation. This was the first manual of navigation to appear in English.

In 1562, Eden became secretary to Jean de Ferrieres, Vidame of Chartres. He remained in de Ferrieres' service until 1572, travelling extensively with him in France and Germany. In September 1573 de Ferrieres wrote to Queen Elizabeth I requesting that Eden be admitted as one of her Poor Knights of Windsor.

== Sources ==
- Arber, Edward, ed. (1885). The First Three English Books on America. Birmingham.
- Hadfield, Andrew (2004). "Eden, Richard (c.1520–1576)". Oxford Dictionary of National Biography (online ed.). Oxford University Press. doi:10.1093/ref:odnb/8454. (Subscription, Wikipedia Library access or UK public library membership required.)
- Lemon, Robert, ed. (1856). Calendar of State Papers, Domestic Series, of the Reigns of Edward VI, Mary, Elizabeth, 1547-1580. London: Longman, Brown, Green. p. 467.
- Parker, John (1965). Books to Build an Empire. Amsterdam: N. Israel.
