= Martín Cortés de Albacar =

Spanish cosmographer (1510–1582)

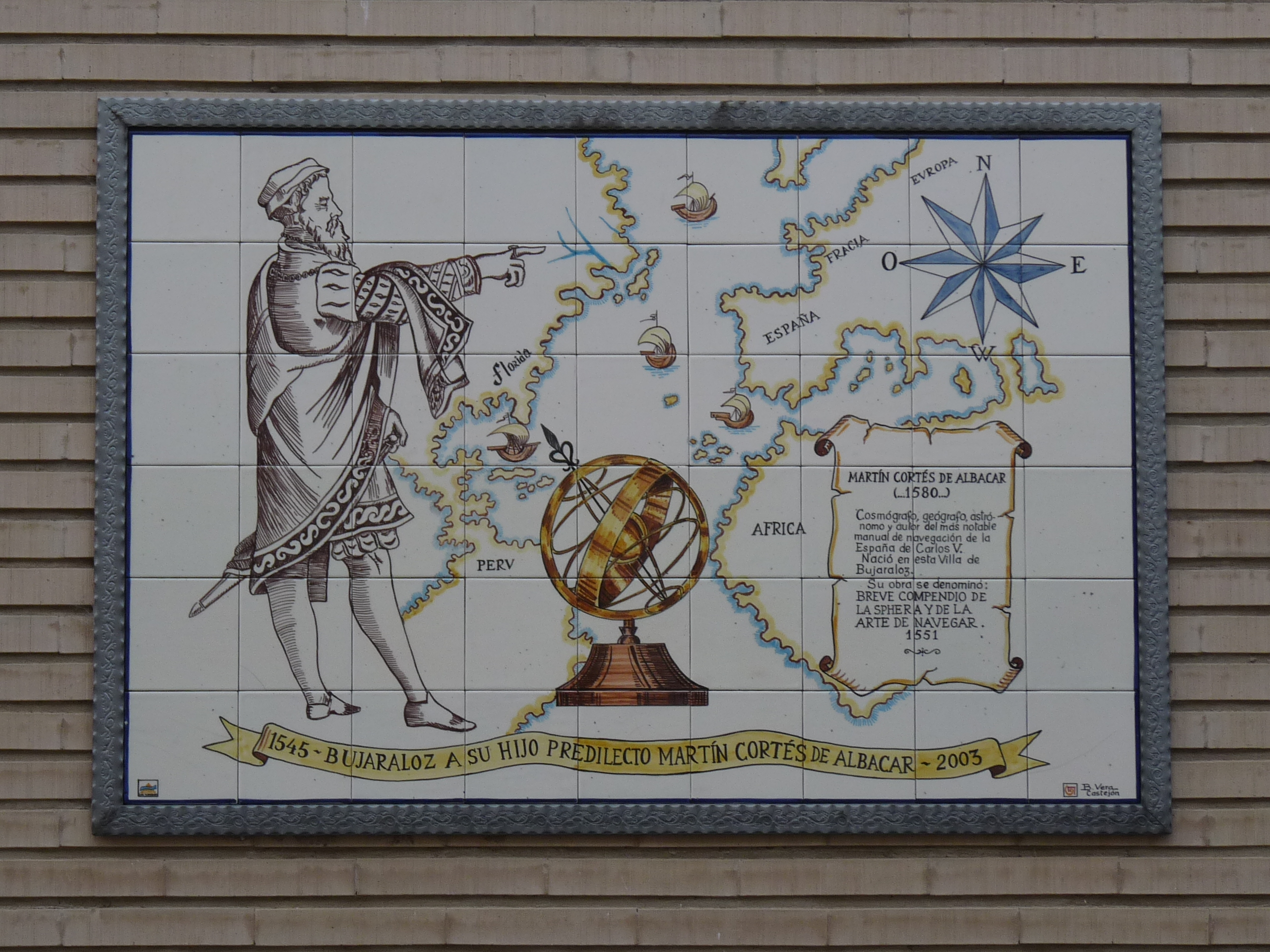
Commemorative plaque dedicated to Martín Cortés de Albacar on the town hall of Bujaraloz.

Martín Cortés de Albacar (1510–1582) was a Spanish cosmographer. In 1551 he published the standard navigational textbook Arte de navegar (also known as Breve compendio). A decade later (1561), Arte de navegar became the earliest known English navigation manual up to date with all of the strategies used at the time. He was an early proponent of a hypothetical celestial magnetic pole.

Cortés was born in Bujaraloz, province of Zaragoza, Aragon. He was raised by a family of sailors and navigators. His upbringing of exposure to seafaring was likely a reason for his interest and successes in his career. Starting in 1530, he taught cosmography and the art of navigation to pilots in the city of Cádiz. Cortes also worked alongside the Spanish Navy, sharing his knowledge by teaching navy ship captains. While it is not known if he was ever in combat, his works were of great influence in the wars fought during and after his death.

== Biography ==
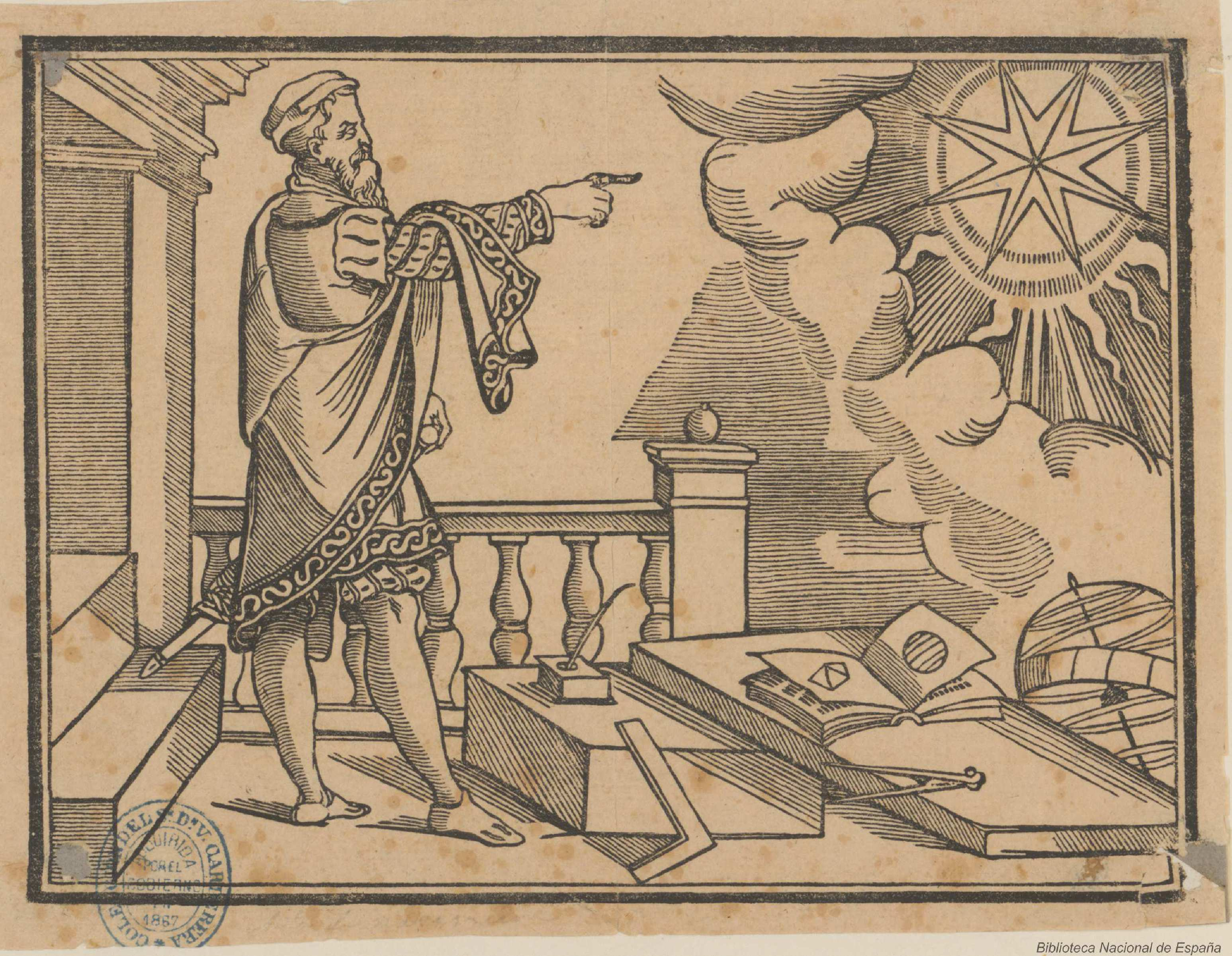
Martín Cortés is depicted in a portrait can be found in the Brief Compendium of the Sphera and the Art of Navigation, which was published in Seville in 1556. This illustration is currently held in the National Library of Spain.

Cortés moved to Cádiz in 1530, where he attended navigation school and quickly dedicated his life to being a teacher. His work was able to be used in all areas of navigation, not just the sea. His main role as a teacher was to certify pilots and oversee the production and maintenance of both nautical charts and instruments, while guiding how to use instruments like astrolabes and compasses. Applying science and logic to navigation was his speciality, by doing this, he was able to give his students a fundamental understanding of navigation rather than just knowing how to use the tools he provided.

In addition to being a teacher, Cortés was known for his ties with the Spanish Navy. While it is not known exactly if he actively participated in any of the battles, he could have been active in one or more of these battles: Battle of Pavia (1525), Battle of Preveza (1538), or Battle of Lepanto (1571). His works and contributions to field navigation had major impacts on these battles, far beyond what any one person could have contributed as solely a captain. So much so that he received the highest level of protection for his works from Álvaro de Bazán. Cortés dedicated his book to Bazán shortly after receiving protection.

While many sources are documenting his works and contributions. There is very little information regarding his personal life. There has yet to be any proof of him having a wife or children. He died at the age of 72.

== Art of Navigation ==
Cortés' book, Breve compendio,... Arte de navegar was first published in 1551 and then promoted by Steven Borough who brought the book to England in 1558. He had the book translated into English by Richard Eden and published in 1561 entitled The Art of Navigation. As such, it became a very popular and the first English manual of navigation. It was the primary text for European navigation throughout the 16thC and the early 17thC. It was revised and extended through nine editions from 1561 to 1630. It was enjoyed by people such as Martin Frobisher and Francis Drake.

Arte de navegar was a practical book in which Cortés discussed, in a concise manner, navigation, cosmography and problems such as magnetic declination for which he hypothesised a Celestial magnetic pole.

He included many illustrations and models for making instruments. The text contained the earliest known description of the nocturnal, and how to make and use a sea astrolabe.

Cortés' calculations were critical in allowing explorers to ascertain their location when out of sight of land.

In 1574, the mathematician William Bourne, produced a popular version of the book, entitled A Regiment for the Sea. Bourne was critical of some aspects of Arte de Navegar and produced a manual of more practical use to the seaman.
