= Nous, princesses de Clèves =

Nous, princesse de Clèves
- Directed by: Régis Sauder
- Story by: Régis Sauder from an original idea of Anne Tesson
- Produced by: Régis Sauder
- Production companies: Nord / Ouest Documentaires, in co-production with France Ô
- Distributed by: Shellac Distribution (France)
- Release date: 11 March 2011
- Running time: 69 minutes
- Country: France
- Language: French

Nous, princesses de Clèves is a French documentary film directed by Régis Sauder, filmed at the Lycée Diderot and released on 3 March 2011.

== Synopsis ==
The movie follows the thoughts and emotions of various teenagers as they prepare to take their Baccalauréat by reading the classic 1678 French novel, La Princesse de Clèves. The film highlights the differences and connections between the lives of the students, many of which are from immigrant and working-class families, and the passions and plots of the 17th-century French court.

== Festivals and awards ==
The film was screened at different film festivals throughout the world, including: 2011 Doc à Tunis - Tunis; 2011 Docudays - Beirut International Documentary Festival - Beyrouth (Liban); 2011 RIDM - Rencontres Internationales du Documentaire de Montréal - Montréal (Canada); 2011 SFFF - San Francisco International Film Festival - San Francisco (États-Unis); 2011 Visions du Réel - Nyon (Suisse), ... and received the 2011 Étoile de la Scam.

== Selected cast ==
- Sarah Yagoubi as herself
- Abou Achoumi as himself
- Laura Badrane as herself
- Morgane Badrane as herself
- Manel Boulaabi as herself
- Virginie Da Vega as herself
- Thérèse Demarque as herself
