= Vidame de Chartres =

French noble title

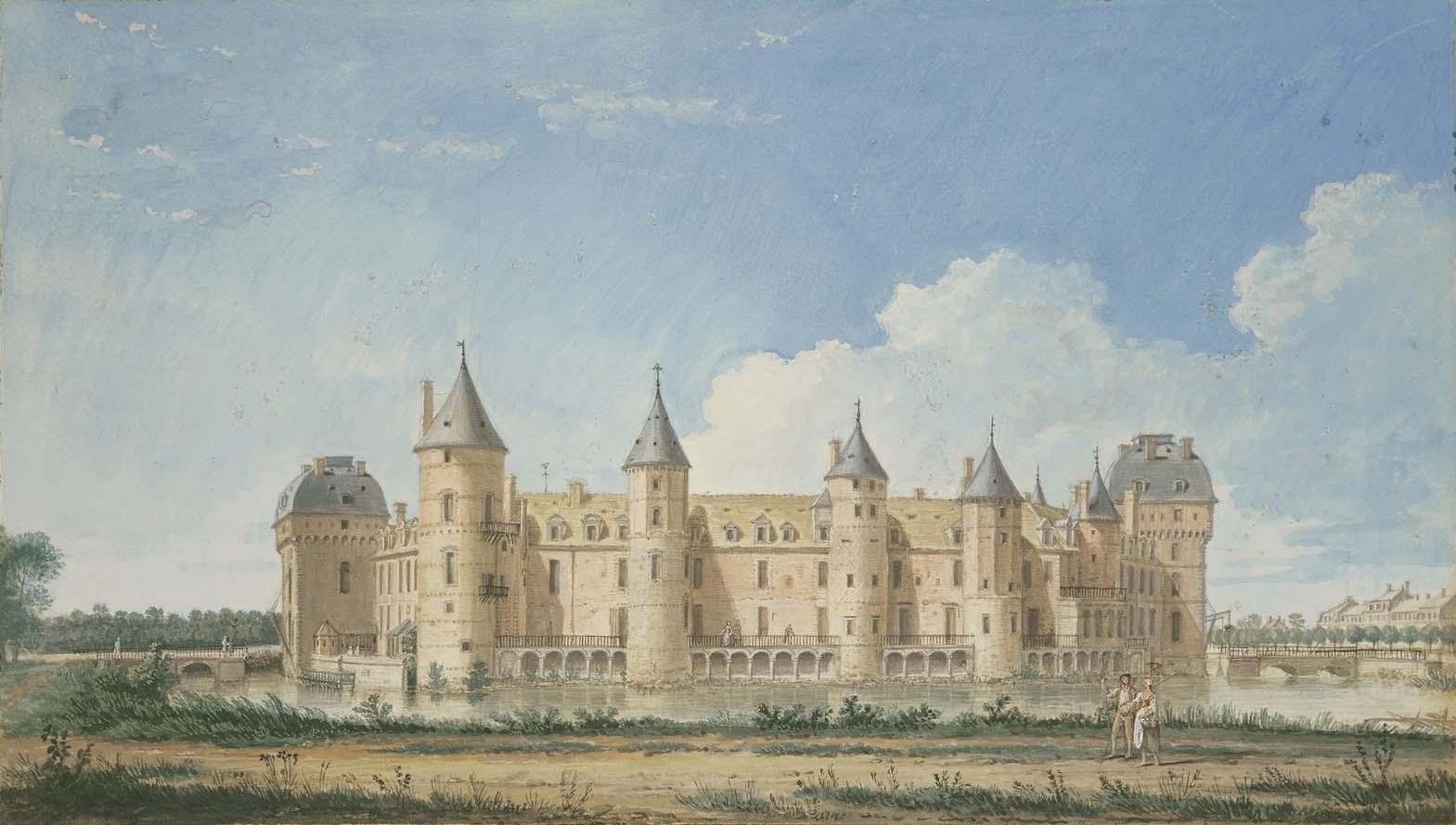
The medieval Château de la Ferté Vidame, built by the Vendômes

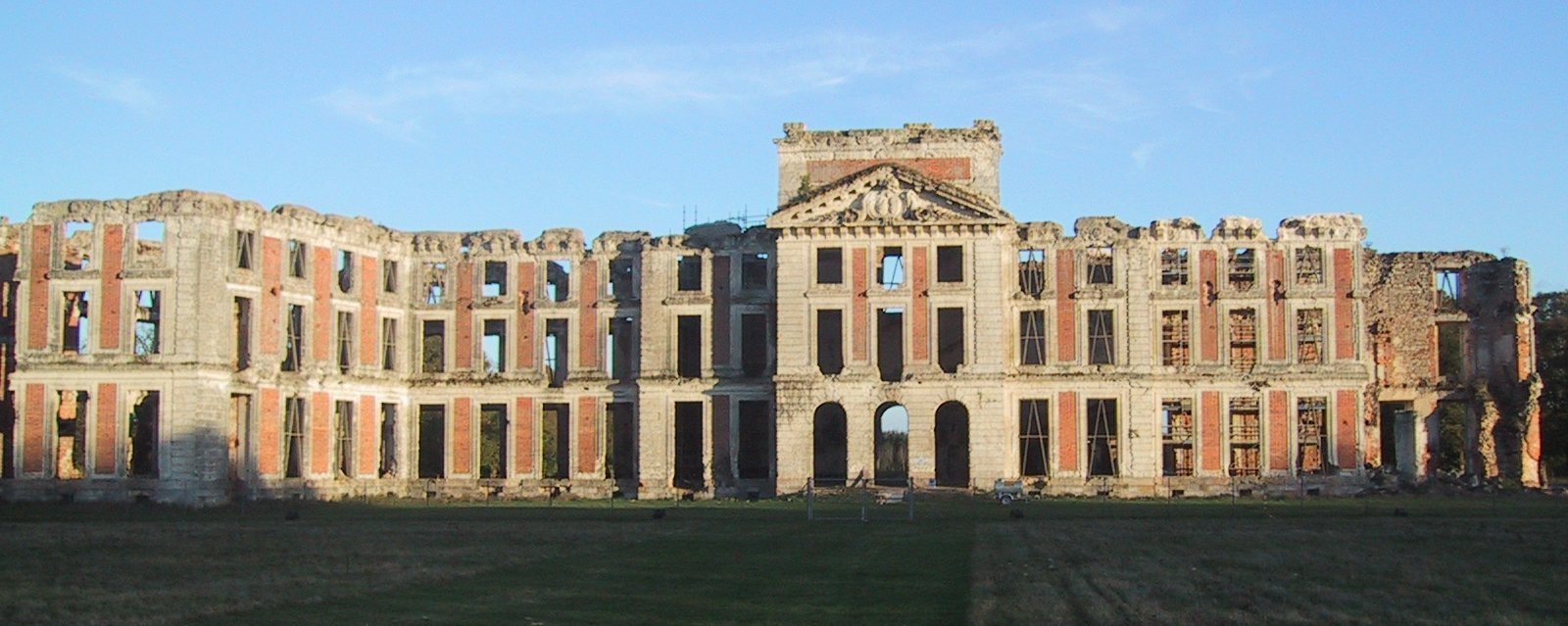
The ruins of the Château de la Ferté-Vidame in 2005

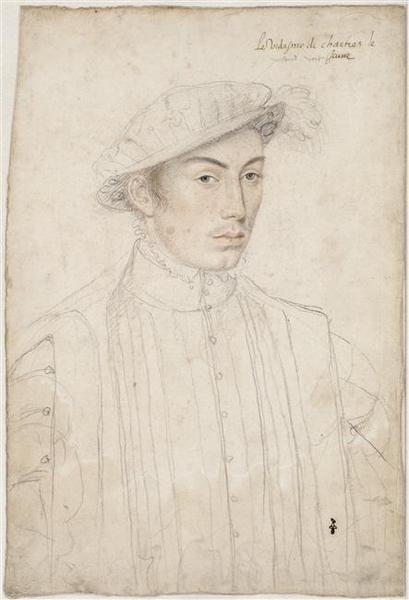
François de Vendôme, Vidame de Chartres, drawing with colour, workshop of François Clouet, about 1550

Vidame de Chartres was a title in the French nobility. There are a few vidame titles in France, of which that of Chartres is probably the best known, because a number of holders have been notable in widely different ways over the centuries. Vidame was originally the name for the commander of a bishop's military force in the Early Middle Ages, when bishops, like other great lords, needed troops for security. The title eventually developed into a heritable noble title, like others linked to a specific estate. The title therefore passed to the new owner when the estate was sold, as happened a number of times in this case.

By the later Middle Ages, the title was held by the owner of the chateau and estate of La Ferté-Vidame (documented by 985), Eure-et-Loir, some 40 kilometres from Chartres. In the 17th century the holder was still supposed to pay an annual fee to the Bishop of Chartres (for holding the land associated with the role, while not performing the duties), ceremonially presented during the mass in Chartres Cathedral on the feast day of the Purification of the Virgin.

== Middle Ages ==
The vidame of the day took part in the First Crusade (1095–1099). The title was held by the de Ferrières family by the 12th century. They had acquired it through marriage with the sister and heiress of the 10th vidame of the family of the lords of Étienne. Confusingly, this was an entirely different de Ferrières family to that holding the title in the 16th century. Holders included Guillaume de Ferrières (grandson of the first de Ferrières vidame, c.1150 – ?April 1204), who took part in the Third (1188–92) and Fourth Crusades (1201–4), and died in Romania as part of the latter. He is assumed to be the trouvère (north French troubador poet-composer) recorded only as the "Vidame de Chartres", to whom eight songs have been attributed. Through his sister the title passed to the lords of Meslay-le-Vidame, Eure-et-Loir.

About 1380 the Vidame's sister and eventual heir Jeanne de Chartres married Robert de Vendôme, who became Vidame after the death of his brother-in-law around 1401. Robert de Vendôme came from a branch of the Vendôme family, a well-connected junior branch of the House of Bourbon. The Vendômes held the title until 1560. They largely rebuilt the chateau to give it the impressive feudal appearance, with eight towers, that it kept until the 1770s.

== Renaissance to French Revolution ==
The title passed to François de Vendôme (c. 1522 – 22 December 1560), who was a successful soldier who figures largely in accounts of the brilliant but decadent French court of the period. The account in the colourful memoirs of Brantôme (1540–1614) place him in the centre of intrigues with Queen Catherine de' Medici (1519–1589), Diane de Poitiers (1499–1566), and the Guise brothers, Francis, Duke of Guise (1519–1563), Charles, Cardinal of Lorraine (1524–1574) and Claude, Duke of Aumale (1526–1573), with all of whom he was at odds by the end of his life. Although not apparently a Huguenot himself, he became attached to the Huguenot convert Louis, Prince of Condé (1530–1569) as the strongest anti-Guise figure. The Vidame was put in the Bastille after the Amboise conspiracy of 1560, in which he seems to have not been involved, and died days after the death of Francis II of France, which would probably have led to his release.

François de Vendôme, always referred to as the Vidame de Chartres, is a major character in La Princesse de Clèves, an anonymous French novel published in March 1678, which mixes historical and fictional characters. It is regarded by many as the beginning of the modern tradition of the psychological novel, and as a great classic work. Its author is generally held to be Madame de La Fayette. The action takes place between October 1558 and November 1559 at the court of Henry II of France, and the account of the Vidame's character broadly agrees with that of Brantôme. The Vidame was further depicted, in similar terms, in Catherine De Medici by Honoré de Balzac, as "the first and only amour" of the widowed queen.

When Vendôme died the title passed to Jean de Ferrières (1520–1586), a leading Huguenot politician and military commander in the French Wars of Religion, who was forced to spend periods in exile in England. He was eventually captured when fighting for the future Henri IV of France by the crown's Catholic forces, and died in captivity when he could not raise the ransom demanded. After de Ferrières died, the title passed by descent to Préjean de la Fin (d. 1624), another plotter, this time against the Bourbon dynasty.

=== Dukes of Saint-Simon, and after ===
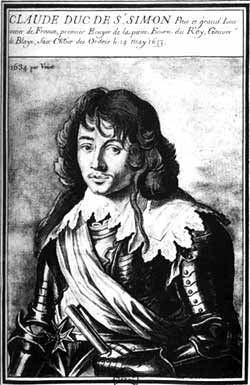
Claude de Rouvroy, duc de Saint-Simon, father of the memoirist

By the time La Princesse de Clèves was published the chateau and title belonged to Claude de Rouvroy, duc de Saint-Simon (1607–1693), who had bought La Ferté-Vidame in 1635, the same year his dukedom was created. His son Louis, the second and last duke and famous memoirist (1675–1755), used it as a courtesy title at court until his father's death; the contrast between the debonair fictional character and the very short teenager may have given rise to some amusement. In turn it was used by his sons. According to the second duke, his father (a younger son) had bought the estate at the request of King Louis XIII – and perhaps with his funds, to give him a seat befitting his new rank as a ducal peer of France.

La Ferté-Vidame passed to the Grimaldi family when Saint-Simon's grand-daughter married a younger son of Jacques I, Prince of Monaco. In 1764 La Ferté-Vidame was bought by Jean-Joseph de Laborde (1724–1794), a very wealthy businessman, who became a fermier général, politician and banker to the king. Laborde built the neo-classical mansion (architect Antoine Matthieu Le Carpentier, from 1771) whose ruined shell remains today. In politics, he was ahead of his time and of the French Revolution, and (with Mirabeau) was one of the only noble députés (from the bailliage d'Étampes) to accept demotion to the Third Estate upon the Revolution. However, this was not enough to save him from being guillotined under the "loi des suspects" on the orders of Louis de Saint-Just, in one of the last fits of the Reign of Terror in May 1794.

After only 20 years the estate was sold to Louis Jean Marie de Bourbon, Duke of Penthièvre (1725–1793), grandson of Louis XIV by Louis Alexandre, Count of Toulouse, his legitimized son with Madame de Montespan (and incidentally, along with his brother, especially detested by Saint-Simon). The sale was in 1784 for 5.5 million francs, a very large sum. The duke died of natural causes in 1793, the last vidame of the Ancien regime. At the Bourbon Restoration, the chateau was restored to his daughter, Louise Marie Adélaïde de Bourbon, Duchess of Orléans. On her death in 1821, the domaine passed to her eldest son Louis Philippe I, future king of the French.

== Holders of the title ==
Notable holders before the revolution include:

- Guillaume de Ferrières (c.1150 – ?April 1204), crusader and trouvère
- François de Vendôme (c. 1522 – 22 December 1560), soldier and courtier
- Jean de Ferrières (1520–1586), Huguenot politician and military commander
- Claude de Rouvroy, duc de Saint-Simon (1607–1693), royal favourite
- Louis de Rouvroy, duc de Saint-Simon, (1675–1755) the second and last duke and famous memoirist
- Jean-Joseph de Laborde (1724–1794), businessman turned politician
- Louis Jean Marie de Bourbon, Duke of Penthièvre (1725–1793), grandson of Louis XIV
