= François de Vendôme, vidame de Chartres =

French soldier and courtier (1522–1560)

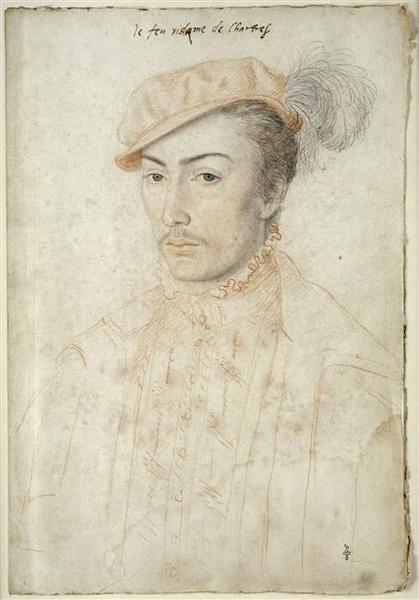
Drawing with colour by François Clouet, about 1550

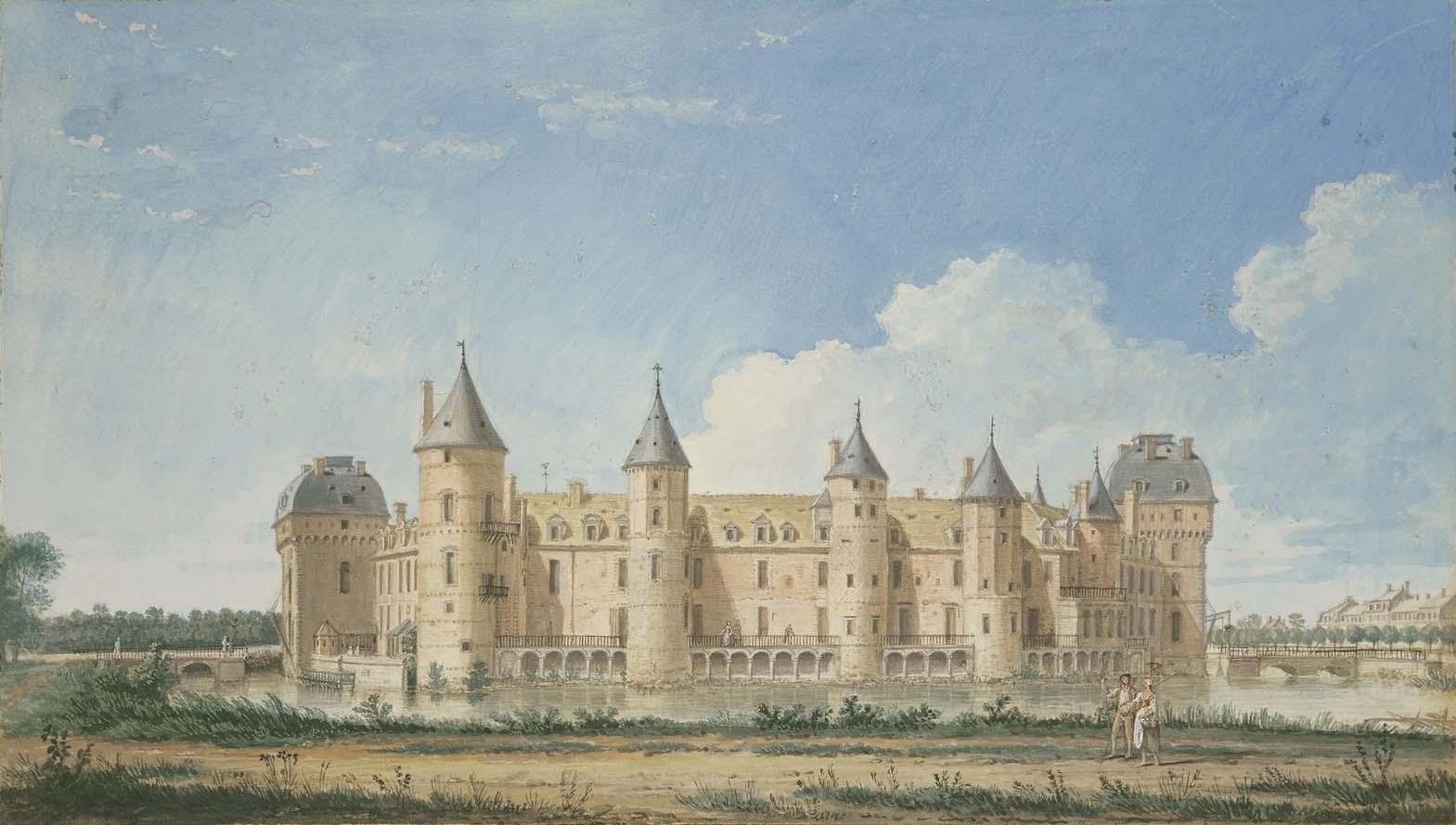
The medieval Château de la Ferté Vidame, built by the Vendômes

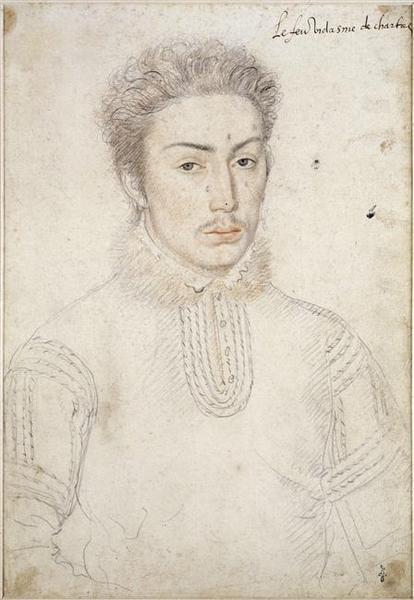
Drawing with colour, workshop of François Clouet, about 1550

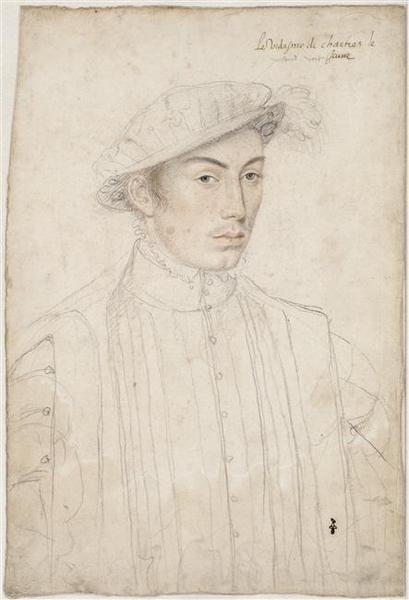
Drawing with colour, workshop of François Clouet, c. 1540s

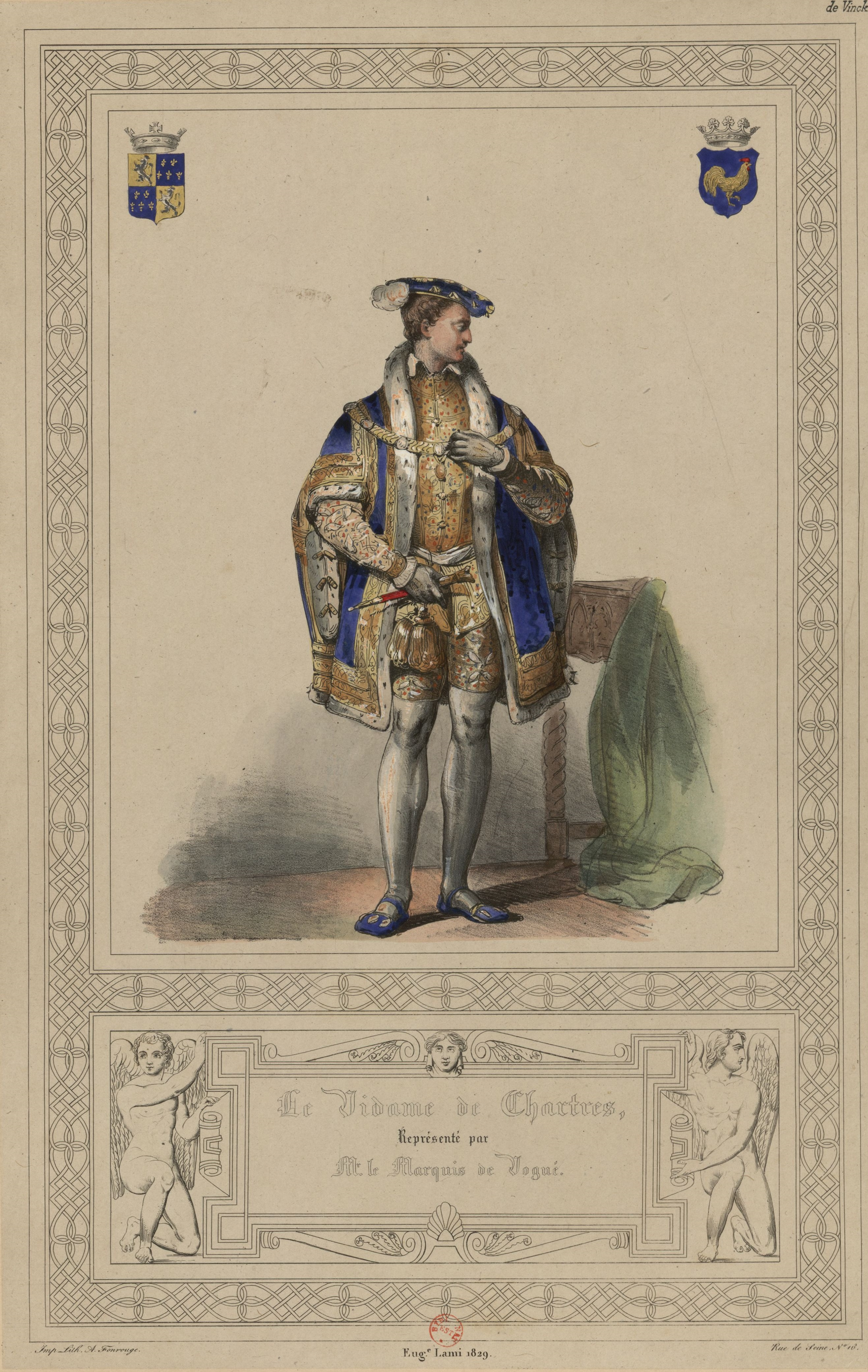
Le Vidame de Chartres représenté par M. le Marquis de Vogué at a fancy dress ball on the theme of Mary, Queen of Scots in 1829

François de Vendôme, Vidame de Chartres (1522 – 22 December 1560), was a successful soldier and glamorous courtier who figures in accounts of the brilliant but decadent French court of the 1550s.

In the 1540s and early 1550s he fought in the Italian Wars, including the Battle of Ceresole in 1544 and Siege of Metz in 1552-53, and became regarded as a good commander.

The account in the colourful memoirs of Brantôme (1540–1614) places him in the centre of intrigues with Queen Catherine de' Medici (1519–1589), Diane de Poitiers (1499–1566), and the Guise brothers, François, Duke of Guise (1519–1563), Charles, Cardinal of Lorraine (1524–1574) and Claude, Duke of Aumale (1526–1573), with all of whom he was at odds by the end of his life. Although apparently not a Huguenot himself, he became attached to the Huguenot convert Louis I, Prince of Condé (1530–1569) as the strongest anti-Guise figure. The Vidame was imprisoned in the Bastille after the Amboise conspiracy of 1560, in which he seems not to have been involved, and died days after the death of Francis II of France, which would probably have led to his release.

Fictionalised versions of him appear in several works in various media, the first and most important of which is as a major character in La Princesse de Clèves, an anonymous French novel published in 1678, over a century after his death.

== Life ==
François de Vendôme was wealthy and well-connected, his properties including the imposing medieval Château de la Ferté Vidame, built by the Vendômes. He also claimed the title "prince de Chabannais", but was and is usually known as the Vidame de Chartres. He distinguished himself as an infantry commander in the battle of Ceresole in Piedmont on 11 April 1544, during the Italian War of 1542–1546, a French victory over the Habsburgs, which their commander Francis, Count of Enghien, a cousin of François de Vendôme, failed to follow up by taking Milan.

He was keen on maintaining contemporary standards of honour. According to the Florentine artist Bartolommeo Bandinelli (1493 – c. 1560) in his memoirs, the Vidame fought a duel with a Florentine noble, having said that the Florentine nobility had degraded their status by taking excessive interest in the manual arts of painting and sculpture. Another story, told by Brantôme, has a Spanish nobleman travelling to France to challenge the Vidame to a duel, having heard he was the most "parfait chevalier" in Europe. The duel took place in Italy, where the Vidame arrived with a hundred gentlemen, all wearing the same magnificent clothes, including a gold chain looped three times round their necks.

In 1549 he was sent to England as one of the hostages given by the French in connection with the Treaty of Boulogne with King Edward VI]. Another of the hostages was the young Claude, Duke of Aumale (1526–1573) of the House of Guise, who with his brothers François, Duke of Guise (1519–1563) and Charles, Cardinal of Lorraine (1524–1574), was to lead the Catholic party in France over the following decades. Aumale and Vendôme became friendly, and at this stage of his career he was a supporter of the Guises.

According to Brantôme's account, he dazzled the English court with a banquet he hosted, where a sea-voyage was theatrically presented, including a rain storm of sweets (candies) falling from above. This was a fashionable effect in continental courts, first recorded at the wedding of Cosimo I de' Medici in Florence in 1539, and mentioned in 1549 for the festivities as Mary of Hungary welcomed the future Philip II of Spain to the Netherlands at Binche Palace.

On 8 September 1550 he was given a passport to travel to Scotland. At this time, Scotland was a different country ruled by Regent Arran on behalf of Mary, Queen of Scots, then a child. Mary of Guise, the sister of his new allies, was the queen's mother. Arran hosted a banquet on his arrival in Edinburgh. He travelled with thirty servants and Laurence Hussey acting as his harbinger to prepare his lodgings. He went as far as Inverness, where on a hunting trip with "the savage inhabitants of the area" (des sauvages habitants du pays), he joined them in eating the still "palpitating" flesh of their prey.

His old commander, the Count of Enghien, had died in 1546, and by Vendôme's next major action, the siege of Metz by Charles V, Holy Roman Emperor in 1552–53, he was commanded by François, Duke of Guise, later to become Vendôme's implacable enemy. Vendôme again distinguished himself, and in 1557 he replaced a dead cousin as commander or "colonel-general" of the bandes Piedmontese, or French infantry of Piedmont, a force who in 1545 had conducted the Massacre of Mérindol.

The next year he was appointed the governor of Calais, which the French had finally regained after centuries of English rule. After a period he resigned his offices, and retired from court. According to Brantôme he had refused a marriage with Louise, the daughter of Louis de Brézé and Diane de Poitiers, because of the taint of bastardy in the family, then taken very seriously; Louis de Brézé was the grandson of King Charles VII of France by his natural daughter with his mistress Agnès Sorel. In addition Diane de Poitiers, now widowed, was the mistress of Henry II of France. In so doing, he infuriated Diane de Poitiers and alienated her allies, the Guises. He had also annoyed the queen by rejecting a bride she had chosen for him from her ladies. He had made a further powerful enemy in the Maréchal Brissac (1505/06—1563), when Brissac was opposed to the Guises. When Diane de Poitiers reconciled them, the Vidame was not included in the new alliance.

Henry II died at the age of 40 in 1559, and was succeeded by his son, the 15 year-old Francis II of France, who was already married to Mary, Queen of Scots. His uncles-in-law the Guise brothers had enormous power, dominating the king's mother, Queen Catherine de' Medici. François de Vendôme had previously been allowed to have some sort of courtly romantic relationship with the queen, probably not amounting to an actual sexual relationship, but was now cast off, as Catherine needed to work with the Guises. The Vidame was now alienated from the dominant figures at court, and allied himself with Louis, Prince of Condé as the leader of the opposition to the Guises, which mainly came from the Huguenots.

He is said to have unwisely signed a letter placing himself at the service of Condé for anything that did not harm the king and his family. This fell into the hands of the Guises, and he was arrested, like Condé, after the abortive Huguenot Amboise conspiracy of March 1560, in which he does not seem to have taken part. François de Vendôme was thrown into the Bastille and harshly treated, so that his health declined. It looked like everything had changed on 15 December, when the king died, to be succeeded by his brother, the 11 year-old Charles IX of France. The Guises lost most of their power, and this time the king's mother became regent, releasing Condé and others of his supporters. But this came too late for the Vidame, who died soon after – whether before or just after his release has been the subject of discussion, as the evidence is contradictory.

When Vendôme died without issue the title passed to Jean de Ferrières (1520–1586), a leading Huguenot politician and military commander in the French Wars of Religion, who was forced to spend periods in exile in England.

== Later literary depictions ==
François de Vendôme, always referred to as the Vidame de Chartres, is a major character in La Princesse de Clèves, an anonymous French novel published in March 1678, over a century after his death, which mixes fictionalized historical characters and purely fictional ones. It is regarded by many as the beginning of the modern tradition of the psychological novel, and as a great classic of French literature. Its author is generally held to be Madame de La Fayette. The action takes place between October 1558 and November 1559 at the court of Henry II of France, and the account of the Vidame largely agrees with that of Brantôme. The Vidame, portrayed as a dashing figure at court, is the uncle of the fictional heroine, who becomes "princesse de Clèves" on her marriage.

One of a number of stories which interrupt the main plot is that of the Vidame, concerning a letter which drops from his clothes when he is playing tennis. A bystander thinks it was dropped by his opponent, the Duke of Nemours, and gives it to him. The letter would reveal that, contrary to his assurances to Queen Catherine, the Vidame has continued with at least one other mistress. In the end the heroine and Nemours get together to write a second letter, to pass off to the queen. But this does not convince her, and she turns against the Vidame.

The Vidame was further depicted, in similar terms, in Catherine De Medici by Honoré de Balzac, as "the first and only amour" of the widowed queen.
