= George Beare (painter) =

English painter

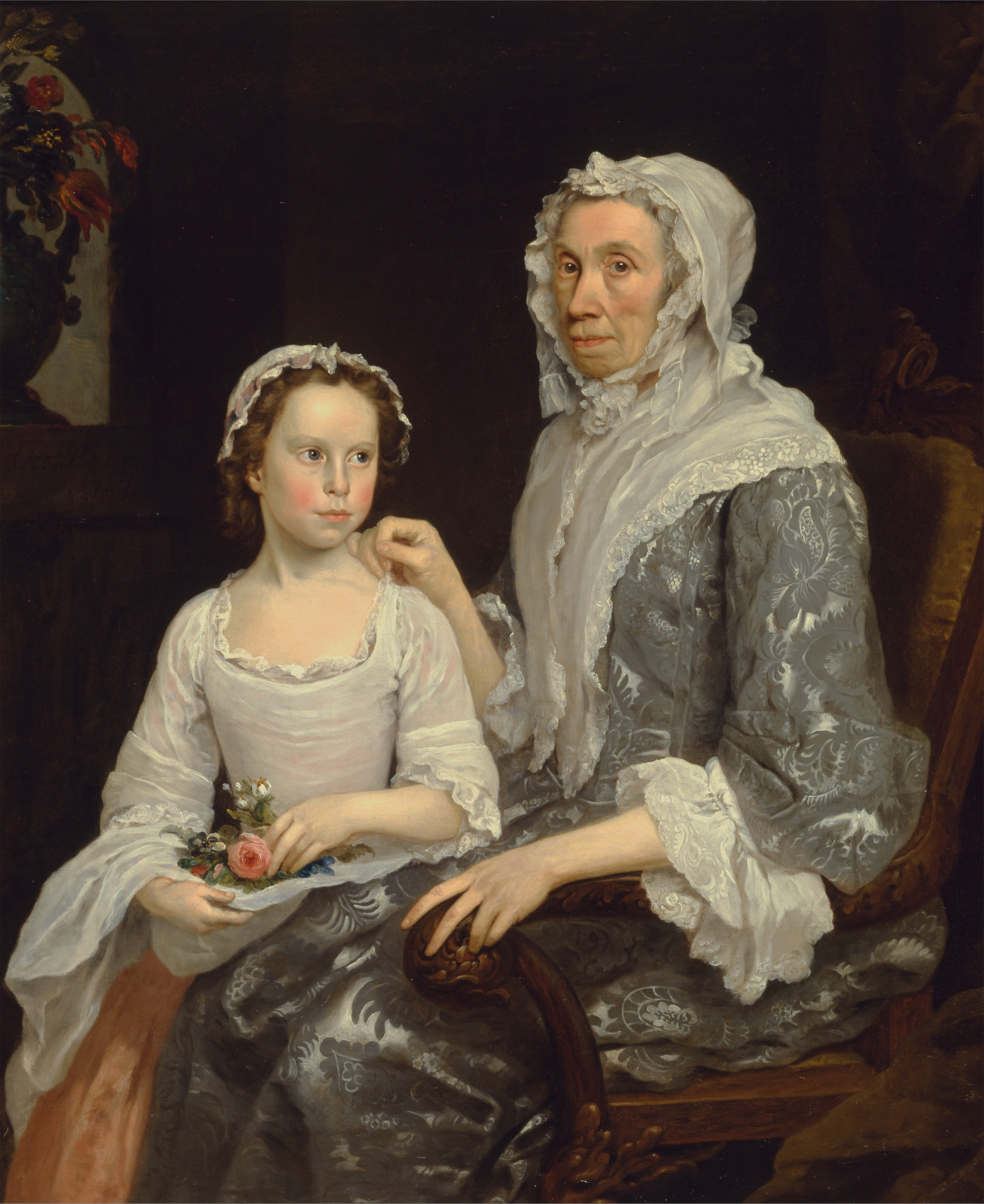
Portrait of an Elderly Lady and a Girl

George Beare (died 1749) was an English painter.

== Biography ==
Little is known of his life, but according to the Netherlands Institute for Art History (RKD) he worked in London, Chichester and Salisbury. He is known for portraits and engravings and died in Wiltshire.
