= Meslay-le-Vidame =

- Commune
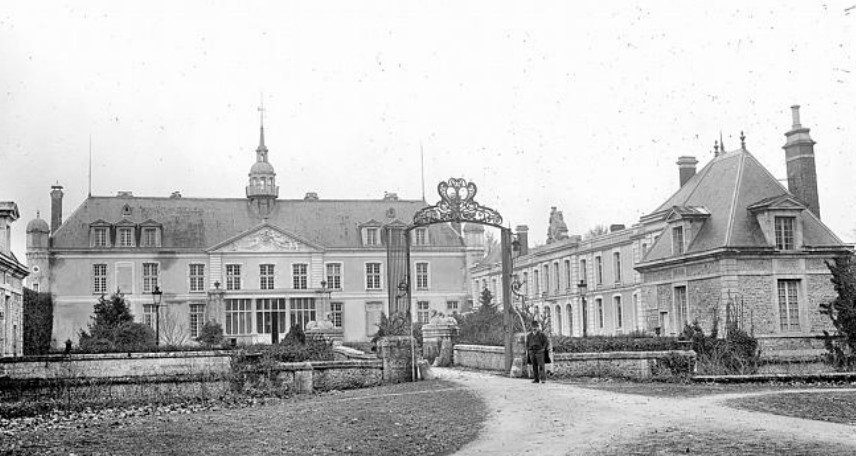
- The chateau in Meslay-le-Vidame

- Coat of arms
- Location of Meslay-le-Vidame
- Location within France Location within Centre-Val de Loire
- Coordinates: 48°16′51″N 1°27′40″E
- Country: France
- Region: Centre-Val de Loire
- Department: Eure-et-Loir
- Arrondissement: Châteaudun
- Canton: Les Villages Vovéens
- Intercommunality: CA Chartres Métropole

Government
  - Mayor (2020–2026): Serge Le Balc'h
- Area^{1}: 14.67 km^{2} (5.66 sq mi)
- Elevation: 148 m (486 ft)
- Highest elevation: 158 m (518 ft)
- Lowest elevation: 138 m (453 ft)
- Population (2023): 508
  - Density: 34.6/km^{2} (89.7/sq mi)
- Time zone: UTC+01:00 (CET)
  - Summer (DST): UTC+02:00 (CEST)
- INSEE/Postal code: 28246 /28360
- ^{1} French Land Register data, which excludes lakes, ponds, glaciers > 1 km^{2} (0.386 sq mi or 247 acres) and river estuaries.

Meslay-le-Vidame (French pronunciation: [mɛlɛ lə vidam]) is a commune in the Eure-et-Loir department in northern France. The lords of Meslay held the title of Vidame of Chartres for part of the Middle Ages.

== Population ==
Historical population
Year	Pop.	±% p.a.
1968	379	—
1975	315	−2.61%
1982	304	−0.51%
1990	364	+2.28%
1999	402	+1.11%
2007	451	+1.45%
2012	530	+3.28%
2017	522	−0.30%
2023	508	−0.45%
Source: INSEE

== See also ==
- Communes of the Eure-et-Loir department
