= Arthur Beare =

Arthur Beare may refer to:

- Arthur Beare, a fictional character in the Australian television sitcom Mother and Son
- Arthur Beare (1875–1945), son and partner of John Beare in the firm J & A Beare, a violin dealership and repair shop in London founded in 1892
