= Antoine Matthieu Le Carpentier =

Antoine Matthieu Le Carpentier (French pronunciation: [ɑ̃twan matjø lə kaʁpɑ̃tje]; Rouen, 1709 - Paris, 1773) was a French architect.

== Biography ==
Antoine Matthieu Le Carpentier was born in Rouen, Province of Normandy, the son of a carpenter.

He became a member of the Académie royale d'architecture in 1756. His students included the brothers Joseph-Abel and Guillaume-Martin Couture, Jean-Baptiste Louis Élisabeth Le Boursier and Jean-Benoît-Vincent Barré.

He died in Paris in 1773.

== Works ==
His works include the rebuilding of the Château de la Ferté-Vidame (1771).
