= Simon Beare =

New Zealand cricketer

Personal information
- Full name: Simon Peter Beare
- Born: 2 July 1979 (age 47); Hamilton, New Zealand
- Batting: Right-handed
- Bowling: Right-arm medium

Domestic team information
- Years: Team
- 2001/02–2004/05: Otago
- FC debut: 12 February 2002 Otago v Central Districts
- Last FC: 21 January 2005 Otago v Northern Districts
- LA debut: 25 January 2002 Otago v Central Districts
- Last LA: 25 January 2004 Otago v Northern Districts

Career statistics
Competition	First-class	LA
Matches	6	6
Runs scored	137	104
Batting average	12.45	20.80
100s/50s	0/1	0/1
Top score	60	61
Balls bowled	192	24
Wickets	8	1
Bowling average	13.25	29.00
5 wickets in innings	0	0
10 wickets in match	0	0
Best bowling	2/5	1/29
Catches/stumpings	9/–	0/–
- Source: CricInfo, 5 May 2016

Simon Peter Beare (born 2 July 1979) is a New Zealand former cricketer. He played six first-class and six List A matches for Otago between the 2001/02 and 2004/05 seasons.

Beare was born at Hamilton in 1979 and played age-group cricket for Northern Districts sides. He made his senior debut for Otago in a List A match against Central Districts in January 2002 before going on to make his first-class debut the following month against the same side.

In 2005, he signed a contract with Workington Cricket Club in England to coach the side and play in the North Lancashire and Cumbria League first division. Workington won the Higson Cup and finished third in the league in Beare's first season, with an innings of 215 in the Higson cup final. The side won the league title in 2007 and 2008, but due to a change in the rules surrounding the use of player-coaches, Beare was no longer able to play in league matches for the side. He played for Callington Cricket Club in the Cornwall Cricket League between 2009 and 2011 before he was able to return to play for Workington in 2012.
