= James Beare =

James Beare (fl. 1577–85) was an English mariner who was part of the Frobisher voyages of 1577–78.

Beare was master of the Michaell on the second voyage and master of the Anne Francis in 1578. Frobisher named Beare Sound after him as he was the principal surveyor of the 1577/78 expeditions. He is considered to have produced the first moderately accurate maps of the eastern passages to the Canadian Arctic.
