= Vidame =

Feudal title in France

Heraldic coronet of a vidame

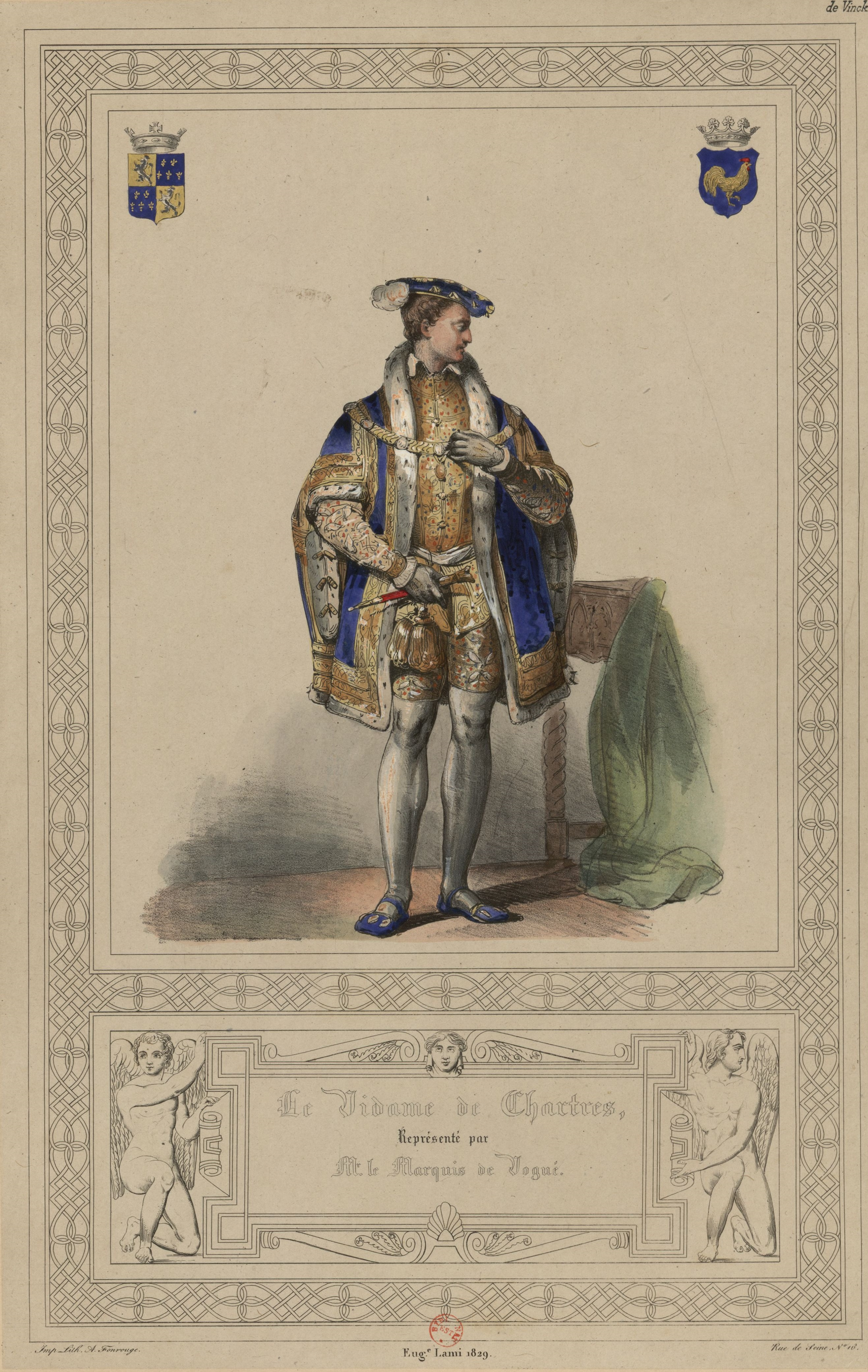
François de Vendôme, vidame de Chartres, drawn in costume in 1829; vidame's coronet visible at upper left

Vidame (French: [vidam]) was a feudal title in France, a term descended from mediaeval Latin vicedominus. (Note: "Vice-lord", which may mean "vice-count", depending on the feudal status of the territory.) Like the avoué or advocatus, the vidame was originally a secular official chosen by the bishop of the diocese—with the consent of the count—to perform functions on behalf of the church's earthly interest that were religiously inappropriate; this especially included violence, even in the service of justice, and to act as protector.

Unlike the advocatus, however, the vice-dominus was at the outset an ecclesiastical official, who acted as the bishop's lieutenant (locum tenens) or vicar. But the causes that changed the character of the advocatus operated also in the case of the vidame. The title of Vidame de Chartres is much the best known, having been held by several people distinguished in various fields and known by the title.

Although a vidame was in theory a relatively low-ranking title, in practice under the French medieval system it gained in prestige and seniority because of the unusually early dates the titles could be traced back to.

== History ==
During the Carolingian epoch, advocatus and vice-dominus were interchangeable terms; and it was only in the 11th century that they became generally differentiated: the title of avoué being commonly reserved for a noble charged with the protection of an abbey, that of vidame for one guarding an episcopal see.

With the crystallization of the feudal system in the 12th century the office of vidame, like that of avoué, had become hereditary. As a title, however, it was much less common and also less dignified than that of avoué. An advocatus was often a great baron who added the function of protector of an abbey to his own temporal sovereignty; whereas a vidame was usually a petty noble, who exercised his office in strict subordination to the bishop.

A vidame usually took his title from the see he represented, but not infrequently a vidame styled himself, not after his official fief, but after his private seigneury. Thus, the vidame de Picquigny was the representative of the Bishop of Amiens, the vidame de Gerberoy of the Bishop of Beauvais (since King Philip Augustus himself was a pair de France, i.e. peer of the realm).

In many sees there was no vidame, the functions being exercised by a viscount or a châtelain. With the growth of the central power and of that of the towns and cities, the vidames gradually lost their functions, and the title became merely honorary.

== Functions ==
The chief functions of a vidame were to protect the temporal holdings of the see (called accordingly le vidamé or la vidamie), to represent the bishop at the count's court of justice, to exercise the bishop's temporal jurisdiction in his name (placitum or curia vice-domini), and to exercise military command of feudal troops attached to the episcopal government. In return, he usually had a house near the episcopal palace, a domain within and without the city, and sometimes the right to levy certain dues on the city.

== See also ==
- Visdomino of Ferrara
