= History and culture of trictrac =

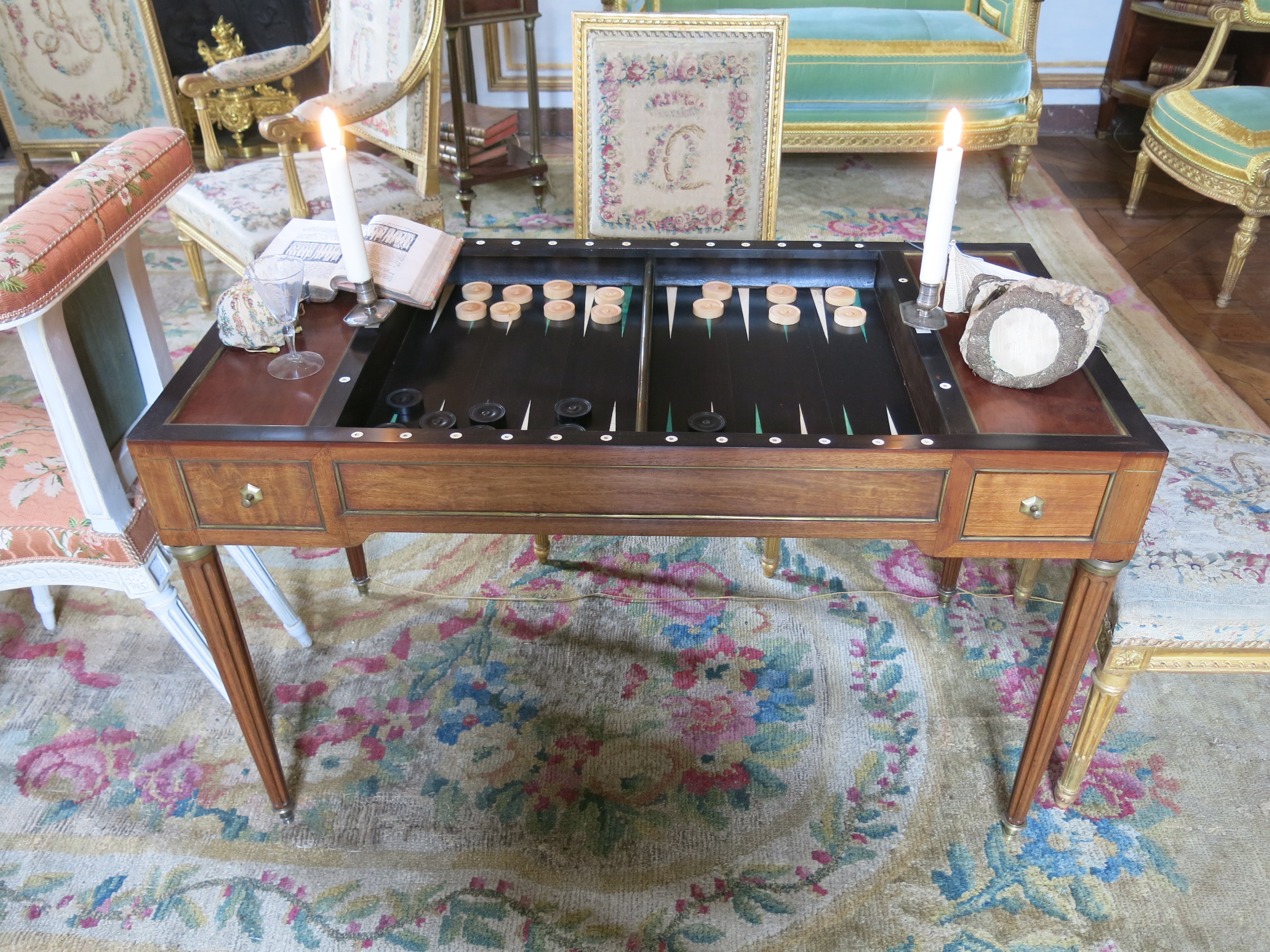
A trictrac set at the Hôtel de la Marine. Beside it sits a well-thumbed copy of 'the Soumille', one of the canonical reference works for the game.

Trictrac, a board game of skill and chance similar to backgammon that was played with dice on a game board, was very popular in France at the royal court and in aristocratic circles in the 17th and 18th centuries. It experienced a renaissance during the Restoration before almost disappearing at the end of the 19th century. It was one of a family of games of skill and chance that included backgammon, then known in France as toutes tables, and jacquet, which was much simpler and did not appear until around 1800.

H. J. R. Murray notes trictrac's resemblance to the Spanish laquet in that neither game features captures of opponent pieces. The oldest treatise on trictrac was written in 1634 by Jollivet, a lawyer at the Parlement of Paris, in order to standardise its rules which had hitherto been handed on by oral tradition. Since then, the rules have remained very stable as evinced by the treatises in the bibliography, only minor changes having been made. One author noted this as early as 1818: "It is common knowledge that it has been played as it is now being played for 150 years, without its rules having undergone significant variations."

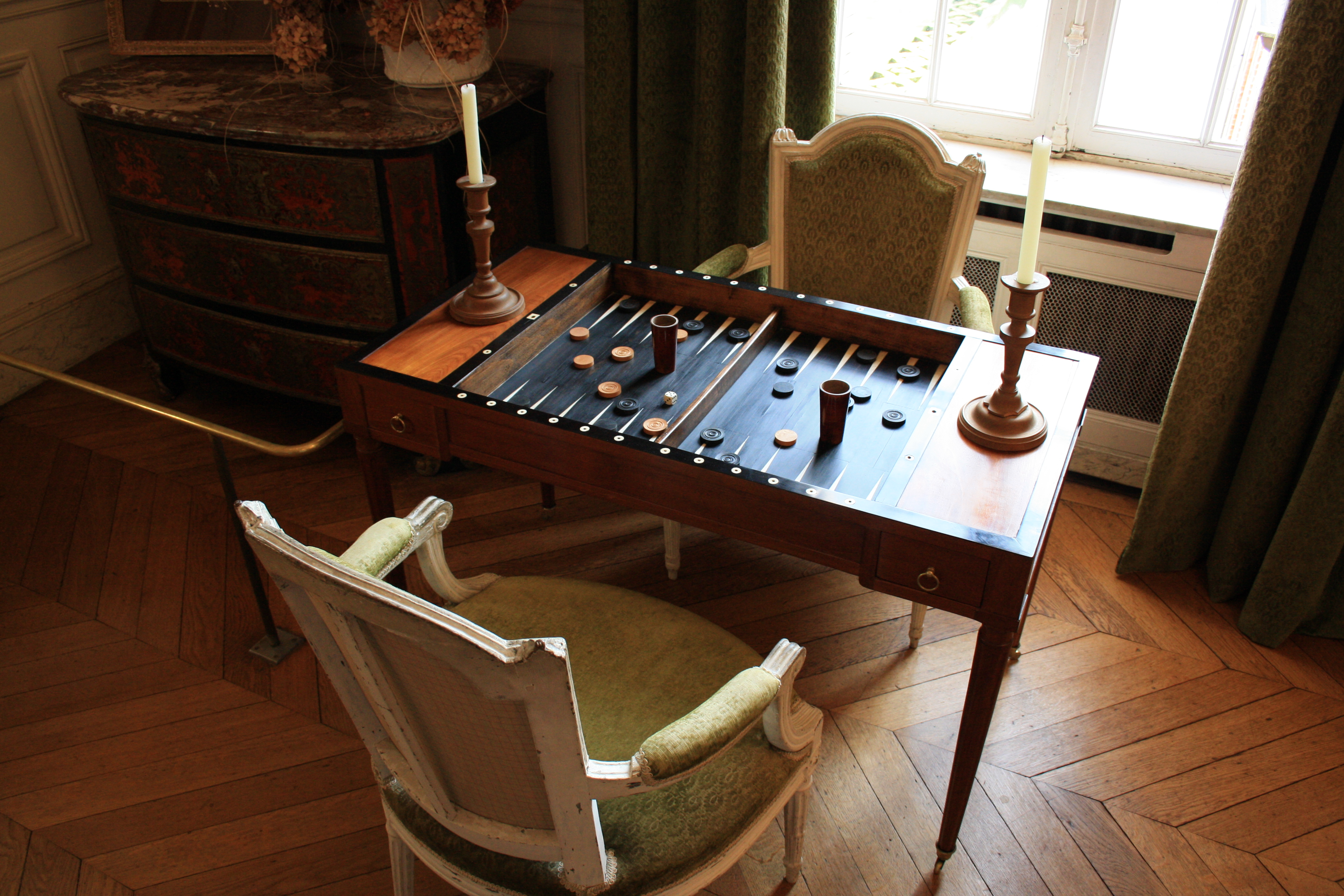
A trictrac set at the Château de Breteuil.

The last major treatise was published in 1852.

== Origin ==
The main sources for determining the origin of trictrac are the treatises published since the 17th century:

Jollivet (1634), in the earliest treatise on the history of the game knew nothing about its age or country of origin:

There are minds who, to appear learned, like to date the antiquity of things to a thousand years before they were found, but this is only a very useless vanity, not to say inept. [...] As for the antiquity of the game of trictrac, I am unable to say, I admit my ignorance, and am not afraid of being criticised, well I know that it will be more productive nowadays researching the titles and movements of the true nobility, than those of the antiquity of this game, which old or new, French or foreign must be regarded as the most excellent of all the social games.

— L'Excellent Jeu du tricque-trac, widow of Jean Promé. Paris, 1656, pp. 8–9.

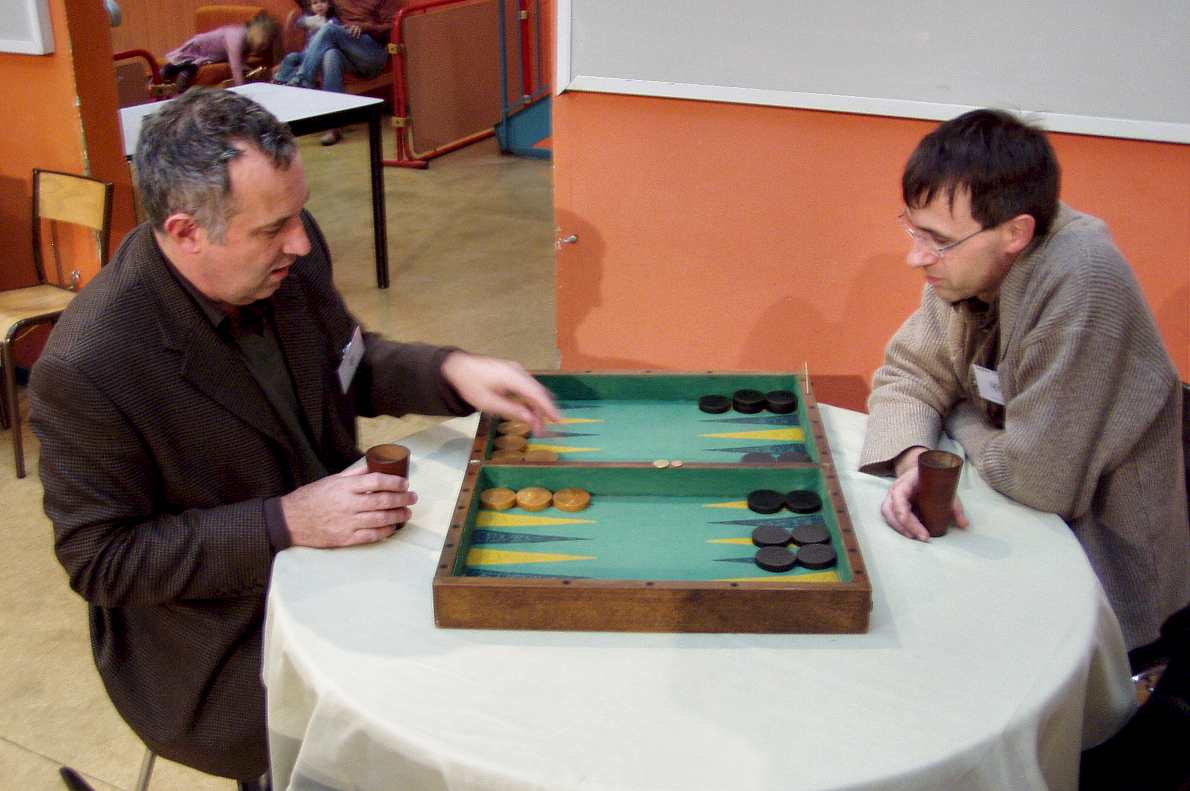
A game of trictrac in progress at the Lumière University Lyon 2; the players are historians Denis Reynaud and Laurent Thirouin.

The anonymous author of the second book on trictrac, published by Charpentier (1698, 1701, 1715) cites two possible countries, France and Germany (in fact, Vienna in Austria) as its origin and comes down in favour of France:

I will say nothing about the antiquity of this game and I will not go into deciding whether it was the French or the Germans who invented it. I know that there were people who gave this glory to the Germans and that several others attributed it to the French. But I believe that if we judge by what seems to us daily, we will easily decide in favour of the French, and that we will agree that we play this fine game better at the court of France than that of Vienna.

— _ (1715). Le Jeu du Trictrac, 3rd rev. edn. Paris: Charpentier, pp. 1–2.

Soumille (1738) and Fallavel (1776) do not tackle the subject nor do Guiton (1816) or Lelasseux-Lafosse who wrote the last major treatise in 1852.

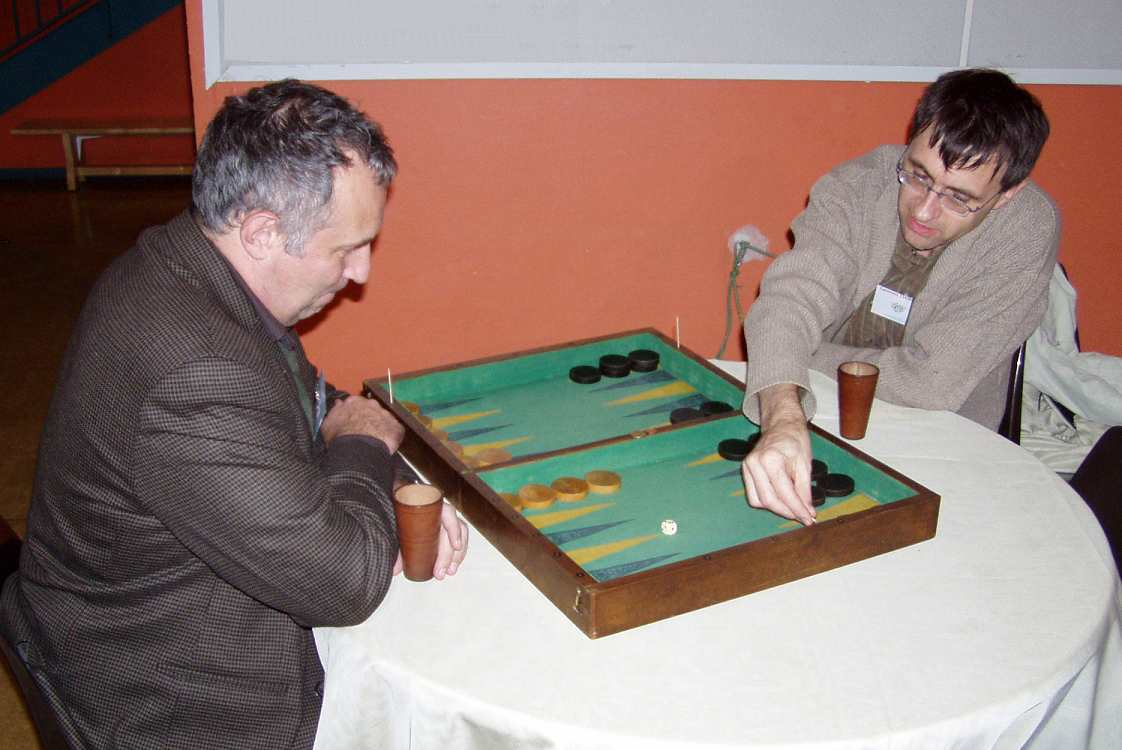
Reynaud and Thirouin continue their trictrac match.

Lepeintre (1818), without providing a source, advances the proposition that trictrac was introduced into France at the beginning of the 16th century:

We do not know exactly to when this particular version of trictrac dates, properly speaking, or when it was introduced in France. It is only a result of reading of our literature that it can be deduced that it is not three centuries since it was brought to us, and it was as commonly played one hundred and fifty years ago as it is today, without its rules having undergone significant variations.

— Cours Complet de Trictrac, Guillaume, Paris, 1818, p. 13.

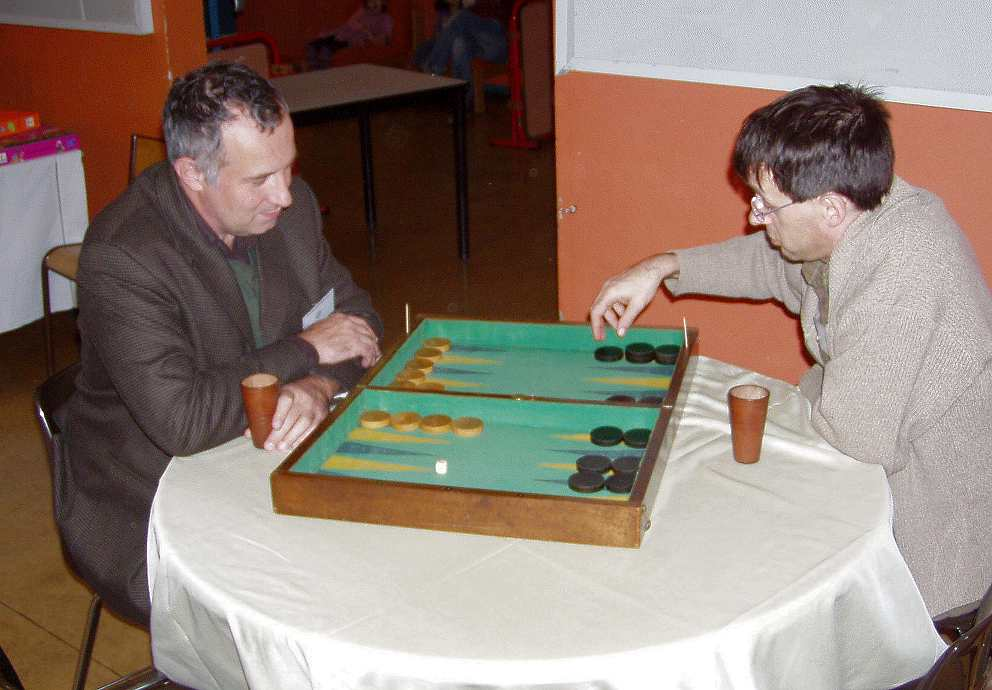
A third photograph of Reynaud and Thirouin playing trictrac.

The treatises on the game do not go back before the early 17th century and searches of the literature are hampered by the fact that the word trictrac was also given to the board used for all table games and modern versions of ancient texts have the word trictrac when it did not exist in the originals. Any search on the word trictrac in its different spellings must be accompanied by that of expressions specific to the game.A poem entitled La Friquassée crotestyllonnée, des antiques modernes chansons, the preface of which is dated 1557, notably takes up, sometimes playing on words, a large number of expressions of children's games, practised at the time in Rouen, three of which are also typical of the game of trictrac:

Grand Jan, petit Jan, Margot la fendue, et tous ses gens

However, these expressions were very common at that time (the first two refer to a deceived husband, the last a prostitute), so the reference to trictrac is not certain. In addition, in 1907 a book was published bringing together in particular group games still played in the Normandy bocage, including the one entitled "Petit jean, Gros Jean, et Margot la fendue" which was played with three counters of wood, one small, one longer and another fork-shaped, and which could well correspond to the one quoted in La Friquassée crotestyllonnée of 1557.

== Tic-tac ==
Tic-tac or tick-tack is a game very close to trictrac, using some of its characteristic situations and features. The movement rules for the men are less restrictive, and points are not scored. As soon as a player achieves a winning game situation that player wins the partie. It is thus a very fast game, a few minutes to a quarter of an hour of playing time, favouring bets and raising.

Jollivet gives it the name of petit Tricque-trac and in contrast that of grand Tricque-trac to trictrac. He also writes that the former was not played by the French. It appears to have been played mainly in England where two authors give rules for it in the middle of the 17th century. Despite the obvious family link between the two games, no source confirms that tic-tac is either the precursor of trictrac or its successor.

== Spelling and etymology ==
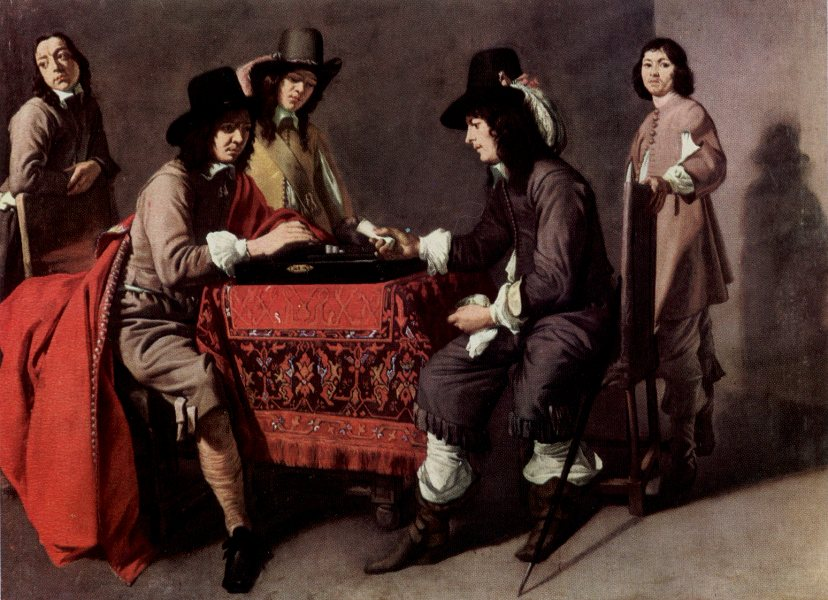
The Trictrac Players by Le Maître des Jeux, painter of the entourage of Le Nain brothers, Louvre Museum

The French word trictrac has been variously spelt: tricque-trac, trique-trac, triquetrac, trictrac and, more rarely, tric trac or tric-trac. Nowadays, only the last three spellings are used, the others having long ago fallen into disuse.

As for etymology, today it is widely believed that the word trictrac is an onomatopoeia, but this is not universally accepted. Jollivet (1634) considers that the word trictrac is an onomatopoeia before asking the reader to be satisfied with this linguistic origin since "the subject is a game and not a science":

The game of trictrac, as I estimate to be probable, comes from the noise which is made without exception in the exercise of the game, to the movement and placement of the men, which in their movements make a continual sound, which seems to be whispering "tric" and "trac", or as some call it "tic" and "tac", which are words really from the sound itself; which means that this onomatopoeia can pass for a true and naive definition.

— L'Excellent Jeu du Tricque-trac, widow Jean Promé, Paris, 1656, p. 6.

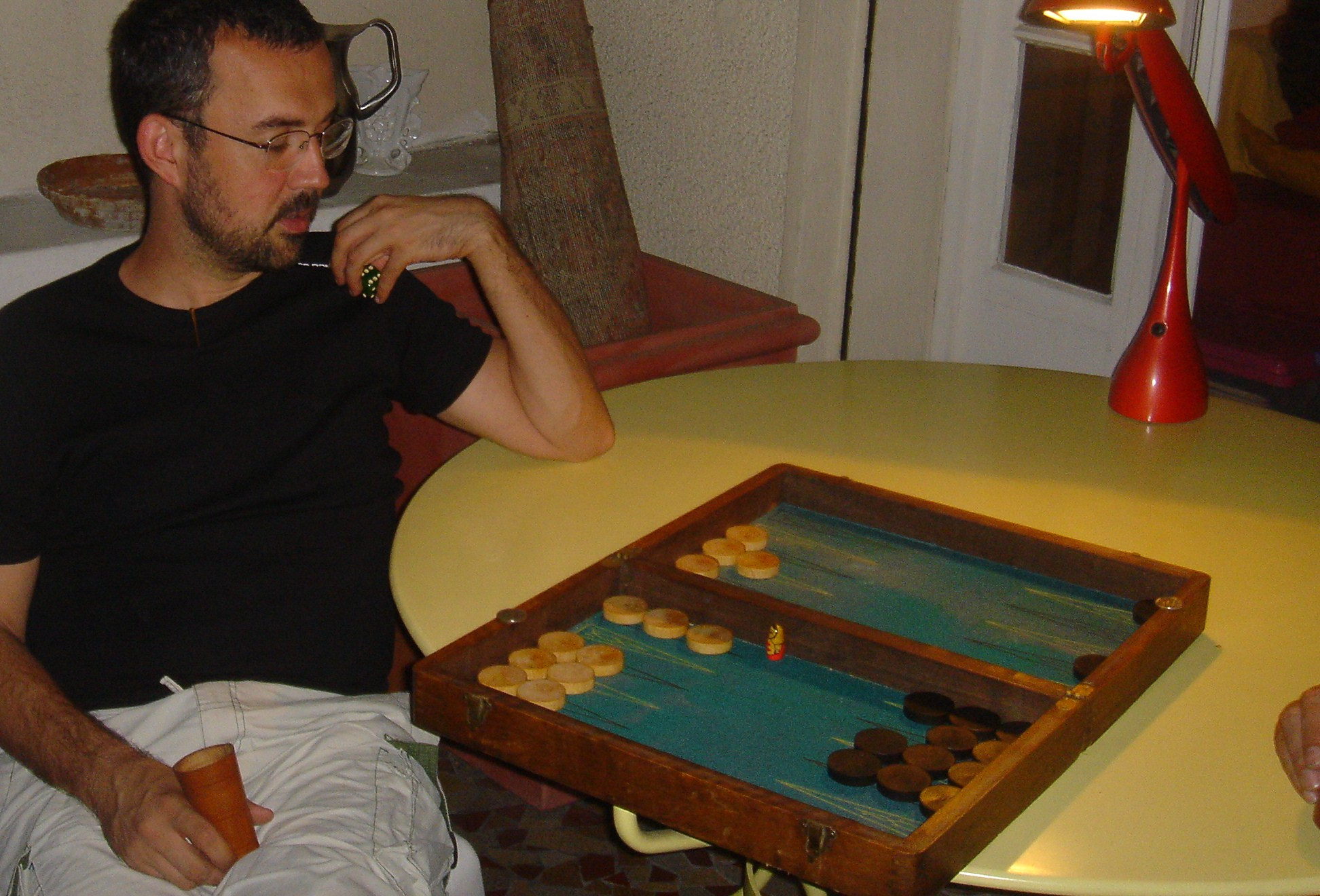
A modern trictrac player in Nice. Because his board hasn't been drilled, he is using coins as 'hole' markers.

The anonymous author of the second treatise, published by Charpentier (1698, 1701, 1715), prefers a Greek origin, more noble and learned:

As for the name of this game, many claim that it comes from the noise that is made by rolling the dice and shuffling the men, because that noise makes a sound that seems to repeat "tric trac" or "tic tac" over and over again. But I would prefer, as a person who knew the game to perfection, to give it a more noble origin and derive it from the two Greek words Τρις-Τραχυς that can be written in vulgar script "Tris Trakus" and which means three times more difficult to play and understand.

— _ (1715). Le Jeu du Trictrac, Paris: Charpentier, p. 4.

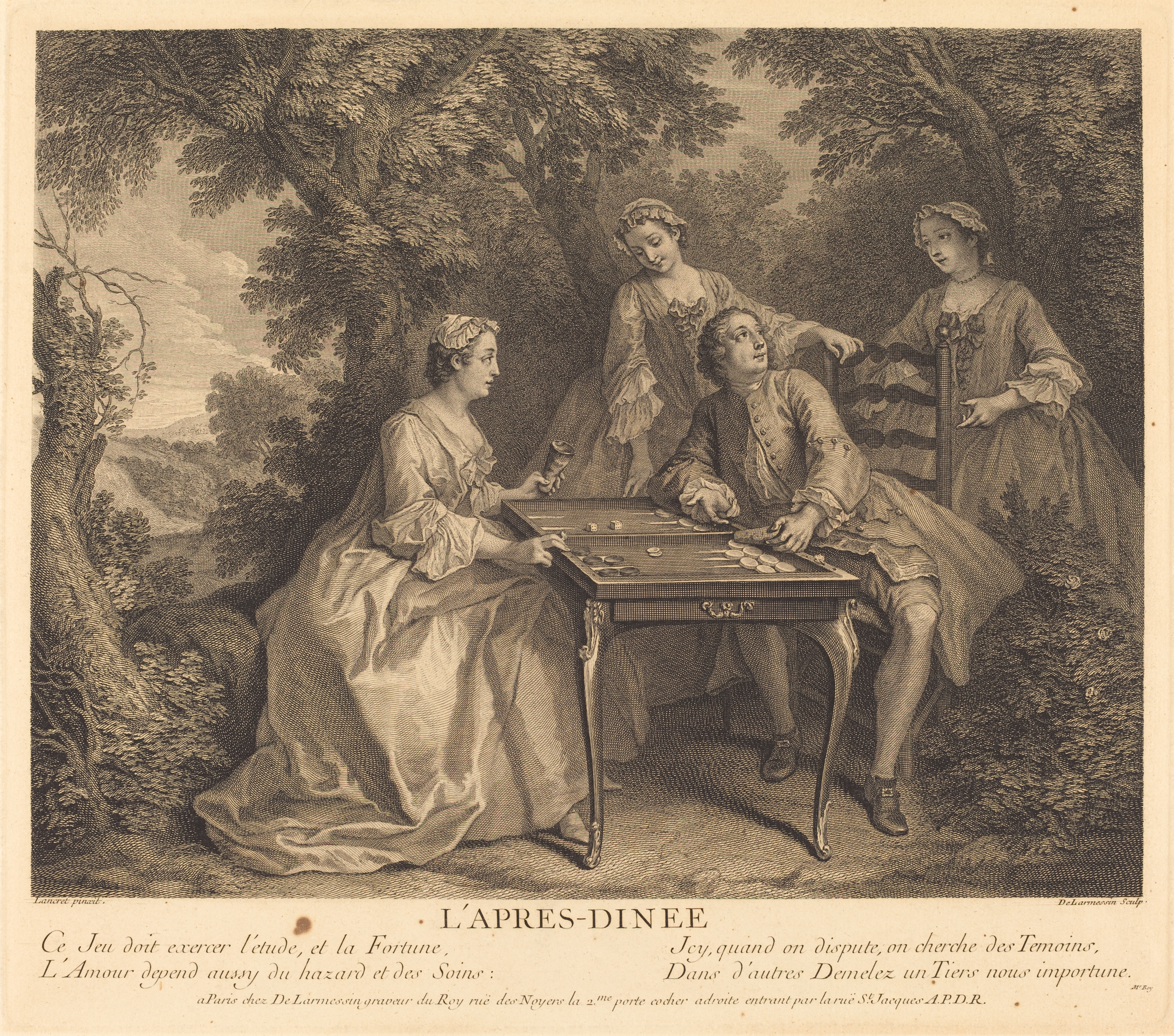
Trictrac players. L'Apres Diner by Larmessin IV after Nicolas Lancret

Soumille (1738 and 1756), quoting the leading lexicographers, affirms that the word "trictrac" is an onomatopoeia:

Trictrac, the rules of which I will describe here, takes its name from the noise made by the men, dice, and cones. Antoine Furetière, Richelet and the Dictionnaire Universel by Trévoux do not give it any other etymology.

— Le Grand Trictrac, Giffart, Paris, 1756, p. 1.

Fallavel (1776) is the most direct: "the game draws its name from the noise we make while playing it."

Guiton (1816 and 1822) does not address the subject, while Lepeintre (1818) initially distances himself from the name being an onomatopoeia before adopting it:

Nothing certain about the etymology of the word trictrac has been found so far. The most learned scholars of the 17th century are of the opinion that this word was formed by onomatopoeia, from the noise made by dice and men; this was the opinion of Ménage, Antoine Furetière and Pasquier [...]. This opinion seems to me to be founded on truth itself.

— Lepeintre, Pierre-Marie Michel (1818) Cours Complet de Trictrac, Paris: Guillaume, p. 13.

Lelasseux-Lafosse (1852), lecturer at l'X and author of the last important treatise of the 19th century, quotes the two hypotheses previously put forward without taking sides:

Many people think that trictrac gets its name from the noise made by dice, men and dice-cups; others say that this name comes from two Greek words which mean three times [ways] difficult.

— Le Jeu du Trictrac Rendu Facile, Ledoyen, Paris, 1852, Vol. 1, p. 2.

In conclusion, there is nothing to support either thesis. While the one on Greek origin appears complex, that of onomatopoeia, although attractive, appears equally uncertain. However, another old meaning of the word trictrac tends to reinforce the onomatopoeia hypothesis, it being also a 17th-century name for a driven hunt:

Trictrac is also a hunting term and means a hunt that takes place in woodland with great noise, to bring out the animals that are being hunted.

— Dictionnaire de l'Académie Française, 1st edn., 1694.

== Poetry ==
A number of verse works treat trictrac as a direct referent; bar one work in Latin, all known examples are in the French language. The first such poem, Les élémens du trictrac by one M. [Monsieur] Cassan, appeared the 1698 anthology, Le Mercure galant; it takes an extremely direct approach, going through the scoring combinations listed above in Alexandrine couplets, and remains the standard work for anyone wishing to explore the game through verse.

Another example, Le jeu du tricque-trac rendu à ses maximes, by an Estienne de Jollyvet, is often found in newer editions of the first trictrac rulebook by Euverte de Jollivet; it serves as a pastiche of the quatrains of Nostradamus, and once again takes a direct approach in explaining not only the rules of the game, but also its equipment. Notably, it references modification (drilling) of the backgammon board by the player himself, implying that many boards sold in France at the time were not so drilled (an unmodified board would serve for verquere or for backgammon, which were played at the time largely as they are today):

Pour marquer aisément le gain qui se fait riche,
Fais percer ton tablier de douze petits trous,
À chaque jeu mets-y ta cheville ou ta fiche,
Pousse-la pour gagner jusqu’à douze coups.

— Estienne de Jollyvet

The sole Latin work is entitled Trictracus carminibus elegiacis illustratus by Jacques Robbe, appearing in an 18-page booklet in 1710; this poem takes the form of traditional elegiac couplets, with a dedication to the "Bignonids" (the family of Jean-Paul Bignon). Humorously, the poem complains of the difficulty in rendering many of the distinctive terms of trictrac in any language but French, and begs the reader to hold back in his criticism on these grounds.

The last such work is that of one Deshayes; it was printed as part of a trictrac glossary in 1834.

== Drama ==
In Jean-François Regnard's comic play Le Joueur, the character Toutabas is named for the tout à bas move in trictrac (that is, using a roll of the dice to move exactly two men from the talon), as described in its rules above. In Act I, Scene 10, mistaking Géronte, compulsive gambler Valère's father, for Valère himself, Toutabas introduces himself as a "master of trictrac", though in a way that suggests his mastery is that of prestidigitation and the use of two pairs of loaded dice, rather than that of trictrac proper:

Avec tous les respects d'un cœur vraiment sincère,
Je viens pour vous offrir mon petit ministère.
Je suis, pour vous servir, gentilhomme auvergnac,
Docteur dans tous les jeux, et maître de trictrac :
Mon nom est Toutabas, Vicomte de la Case,
Et votre serviteur, pour terminer ma phrase.
...
Et c'est de là que vient la beauté de mon art.
En suivant mes leçons, on court peu ce hasard.
Je sais, quand il le faut, par un peu d'artifice,
D'un sort injurieux corriger la malice ;
Je sais dans un trictrac, quand il faut un sonnez,
Glisser des dés heureux, ou chargés, ou pipés ;
Et quand mon plein est fait, gardant mes avantages,
J'en substitue aussi d'autres prudents et sages,
Qui, n'offrant à mon gré que des as à tous coups,
Me font en un instant enfiler douze trous.

— Toutabas, in Le Joueur

Attentive readers will note the use of the technical terms sonnez (double six), plein (fill), as (ace), and enfiler (to string together, to enfilade).

Toutabas then offers to teach Géronte how to "palm a die like me" ("Je veux, par mon savoir extrême, / Que vous escamotiez un dé comme moi-même") and demands a month's wages in advance, at which point he is forcefully rebuffed.

(A modern equivalent might be to use magnetic dice; these are manufactured to force 1 or 6 via the strategic use of a magnetic finger-ring, eliminating the need to palm and switch loaded dice. The compliance of such devices with the rules of trictrac as commonly construed may, however, be open to doubt, at least in contexts involving wagers.)

These practices were recognised and condemned with some force in much of the literature. One of the quatrains hereabove described notes:

On use de cornets pour ôter toute fourbe,
Avise que les dés n’aient point de vif-argent,
Prends-les justes, carrés, et qu’ils n’aient rien de courbe.
Faut être sur les dés exact et diligent.

— Estienne de Jollyvet, Le jeu du tricque-trac rendu à ses maximes

== Social class of trictrac players and the game's popularity by period ==
=== Ancien Régime ===
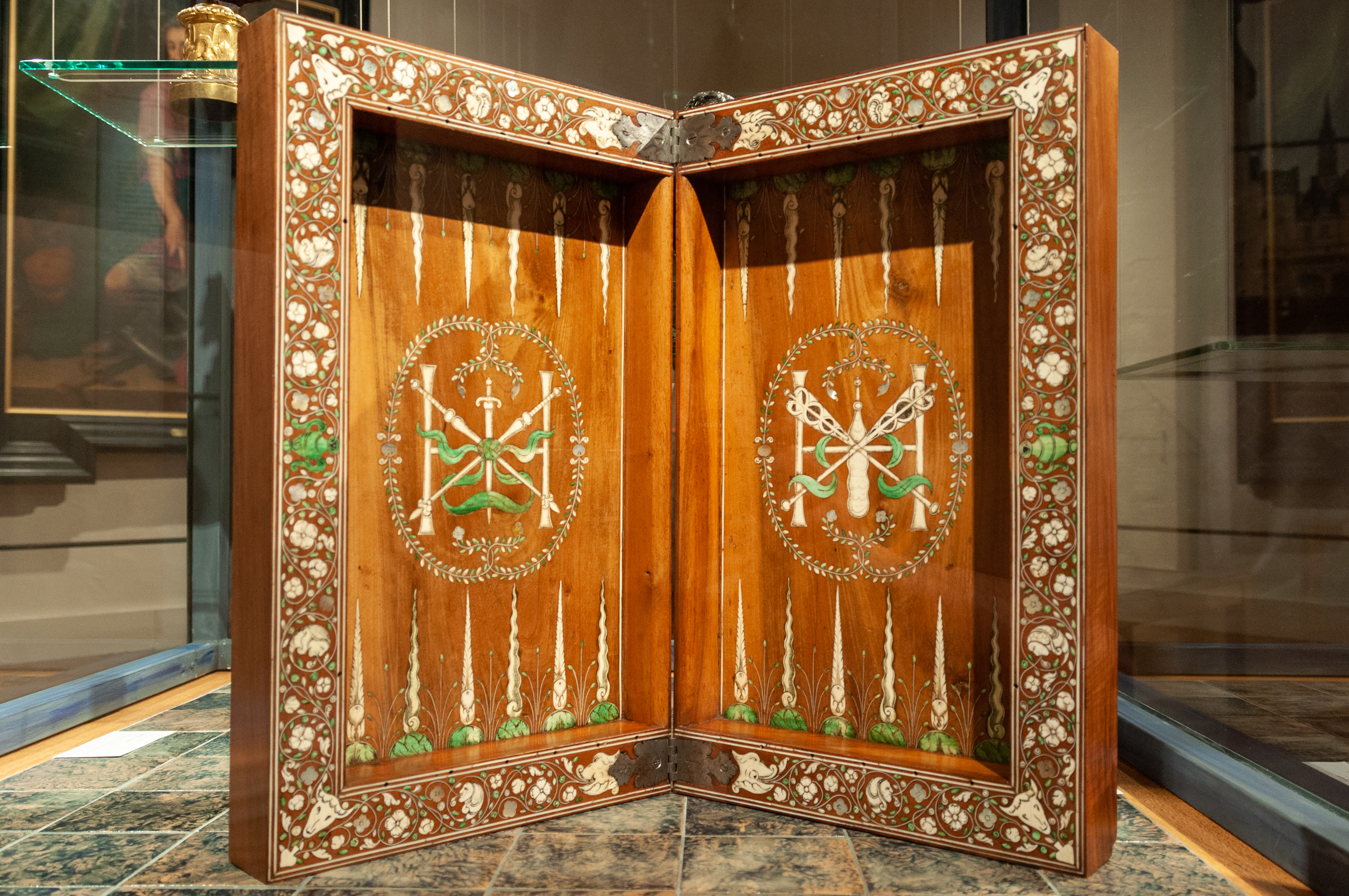
Trictrac board bearing the monogram of Henry IV, made between 1594 and 1610. Its rails are discreetly pierced with the holes required for the movement of the scoring pegs.

Trictrac does not seem to have been played, or was played only very little, outside the salons of high society, where it was practised by both sexes.

The full title of Euverte Jollyvet, sieur de Votilley's treatise, L'Excellent Jeu du tricque-trac. Très Doux Esbattement és nobles compagnies, would by itself suffice to justify this supposition regarding the seventeenth century. A quotation from this book, first published in 1634, is unambiguous:

Another reason for its excellence may be drawn from the fact that, out of a hundred thousand persons who may know this game, one will not find ten of such condition who know and practise it; whereas almost all other games are as common among pages, servants, and lackeys as among princes, lords, and gentlemen [...] But at Grand Trictrac, only people of honour practise it, and only the most intelligent, active, and vigilant can understand it.

— L'Excellent Jeu du tricque-trac, widow of Jean Promé, Paris, 1656, p. 11.

At the end of the reign of Louis XIV, trictrac still retained all its popularity in the salons, as is attested in the treatise Le Jeu de trictrac, comme on le joue aujourd'hui, published in 1698, 1701, and 1715:

The excellence, beauty, and fairness found in this game cause polite society to apply itself to it with great care, to make it its favourite game, and to prefer it to other games. Indeed, this fine game has so much nobility and distinction that we see it is more fashionable than ever. The ladies are very greatly attached to it [...]

— Le Jeu du trictrac comme on le joue aujourd'hui, Charpentier, Paris, 1715, pp. 2–3.

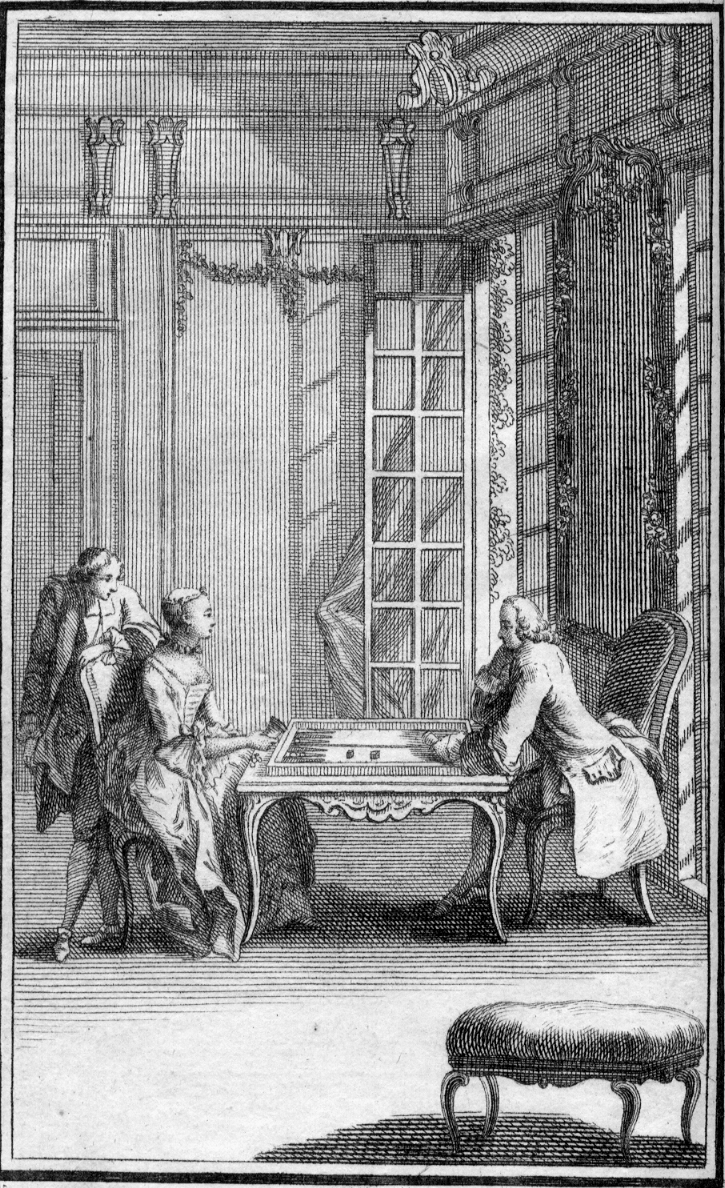
Frontispiece of the second edition of Soumille's Grand Trictrac, Giroud, Avignon, 1756.

Under Louis XV, in 1738, Abbé Laurent Soumille, in the preface to his treatise Le Grand Trictrac, published in Avignon, bears witness to players' loss of interest in trictrac and attributes the cause to the complexity of the rules and to the scarcity of good masters:

Scarcely, at times, does one find a good trictrac player in a town; and to learn it from him, there would have to be a fortunate conformity of leisure, feelings, and inclinations: all things so difficult to find in two persons that one must not be surprised if this game, noble though it is, has so little currency in the world.

— Le Grand Trictrac, Girard and Seguin, Avignon, 1738, "Preface".

Soumille's book probably helped revive the game of trictrac, and the period that followed was that of the elegant trictrac tables that came to furnish drawing rooms. Until then (and since), hinged boards (i.e. attaché cases, with chess or draughts on the outside and trictrac and backgammon when opened) had been used.

Under Louis XVI, Fallavel, in his treatise Le Jeu du trictrac, ou les Principes de ce jeu, is optimistic about the popularity of the game, but indirectly expresses his fears for its future:

This might perhaps be the place to make an apology for the game of trictrac and to show how far it surpasses all the games that are today the entertainment of society; but it is well enough known not to need its advantages to be set forth, and it has endured for too long, despite all the vicissitudes of fashion, for one to fear that it will ever be abandoned.

— Le Jeu du trictrac, Nyon, Paris, 1776, "Notice".

=== Restoration ===
After the fall of Napoleon Bonaparte, with the restoration of the monarchy, the families of royalist émigrés returned to France; and Lepeintre, in 1818, in his treatise entitled Cours complet de trictrac, avec un abrégé du gammon, du jacquet et du garanguet, gives an account of the situation regarding the game of trictrac:

Unknown to the coarse classes, it presupposes, in those who play it, good manners and experience of society, except for a very small number of professional players who spend their lives in cafés or gambling dens. Thus, through the complexity of its course of play, it is at once beyond the reach of common people and an easy recreation for the polished part of society; equally agreeable to young people and old, to the fair sex and to philosophers, to scholars and to people of the world [...] In Paris there are a great many persons who have abandoned draughts, chess, playing cards, and especially trictrac, to go and spend their leisure at the green baize, something of which they most often bitterly repent for the rest of their lives [...] Trictrac, although much more widespread [than draughts], likewise counts only veterans among its principal enthusiasts. There are no longer any truly strong players, since the very recent death of a person of distinction who excelled at it, M. le duc de Laval-Montmorency, [...] This game would therefore be threatened with total decline in the salons, if the restoration of good company did not guarantee us its own restoration. Let us not doubt it: it will regain its vogue; it will become again what it once was: the recreation of honourable people, and of persons well born and well brought up.

— Cours complet de trictrac, Guillaume, Paris, 1818, "preliminary discourse", pp. 1–3.

Lepeintre, at the end of his treatise, gives an idea of what trictrac could mean to its devotees when he has the old hermit of Morbihan, a master of trictrac, say:

There I shall die peacefully, dice-cup in hand: I want, after my death, my favourite trictrac board to be buried with me, and a mausoleum raised over me on which the figure of this game shall be carved, with a Latin inscription containing the enumeration of the victories it won for me, and this epitaph:

Here lies one who, for his own good, did nothing at the proper time:

A poor speculator and very little of a politician;
Trictrac composed all his rhetoric;

At last he took his corner in the field of rest.

— Cours complet de trictrac, Guillaume, Paris, 1818, pp. 153–154.

The prediction of trictrac's return to the salons seems indeed to have come true, if one takes into account the fact that the majority of trictrac tables offered for sale today by antique dealers date from the Restoration, and also trictrac's place in the works of classic authors such as Balzac, with Le Lys dans la vallée, or Prosper Mérimée, with La Partie de trictrac.

Partie de tric-trac, short film directed by Louis Lumière (1896).

At the end of the nineteenth century, in 1896, the short film directed by Louis Lumière and entitled Partie de tric-trac in fact depicts a game of jacquet, recognisable from the direction in which the men move around the board and from the quadruple moves connected with doublets of the dice.

Jacquet, much simpler to play and fundamentally different (being a prototypical race game rather than a point-accumulation game), had by then ended up dethroning trictrac as a practical matter, but the author, for one reason or another, used the name tric-trac for the title of his short film. A mistake is possible, though it could conceivably have been intentional as a reference to Mérimée.

=== Twentieth century ===
Jacquet underwent something of a meteoric rise and subsequent fall in popularity during this period, a fact presaged by the mass manufacture at this time of boards intended specifically for it; until approximately World War II, jacquet players in France would generally use a trictrac board, though pack-in instruction sheets routinely included only the rules of jacquet long before this, potentially due to cost concerns (the rules of jacquet fill a single page, but a moderately thick booklet is needed for the rules of trictrac). This situation in a way echoes that of the 17th and 18th centuries, when players were specifically advised on how best to improvise playing equipment and drill their boards with scoring holes under the assumption that their boards were not so prepared. (Parenthetically, jacquet is the French name for the same game that is called φευγά in Greece and mültezim in Turkey; Greek boards had never been drilled, and served for plakoto and backgammon in addition. A trictrac board can serve for essentially all tables games.)

Nevertheless, neither trictrac boards nor trictrac rulebooks ever went out of print, though hardly any original material was written on the subject. One illustrative example: Richard's Traité du jeu de trictrac, which was published in 1874 with numerous reprints since then, was itself nothing but a reprint of Principes du jeu de trictrac à la portée des commençants; for another, Jean Tourangin's Le jeu du grand tric-trac, originally published in 1940, which was later augmented with the rules of jacquet and backgammon written by Jacques Léchalet and republished or reprinted many more times, for example in 1976. As a fad, jacquet went out of fashion in the 1960s, outflanked by backgammon from one direction and by television from the other – though, as with trictrac, it continued to be played and acquired a certain nostalgia.

=== Today ===
The contemporary trictrac scene in France relies to a large extent on the works of Jollyvet, Charpentier, Soumille, Fallavel, Guiton, Lelasseux-Lafosse, and, to a lesser degree, Lepeintre. Although some of these texts are quite old, they are still read and used by players today. Since then they have been supplemented by newer resources, such as an online trictrac glossary, a video tutorial on YouTube, and an online game.

Because it can truthfully be said that these authors fairly captured the entirety of the rules and a significant amount of theory, they will likely continue to form the backbone of trictrac instruction long into the future, though repackaged for modern audiences. For instance, a number of rulebooks (certainly those of Guiton and Lelasseux-Lafosse) are available as repositories on GitHub.

It is certainly true that, without these materials, trictrac today could no longer be played in accordance with all of its rules. In particular, were it to be learned only through the literature of the 20th century, altogether discounting earlier works, much of the enforcement and adjudication layer would be lost, as would many of the expressions used in French literature and peculiar to trictrac alone.

The barrier to the game's popularity elsewhere in the world is that the terms of its living culture resist translation; though trictrac was and is played in Sweden, Denmark, Germany, and Austria–and it might, in the words of more than one trictrac author, have been invented in the latter–it certainly attained its degree of popularity in France. Thus, much of the jargon is avowedly French.

== Trictrac and politics ==
In the seventeenth century, the expression trictrac de la cour — "the trictrac of the court" — was commonly used to speak of political affairs. Euverte Jollyvet, in order to emphasise the importance of the game of trictrac in the society of that period, offers testimony to this:

[...] the proverb that runs, among both the learned and the unlearned, when people say on every occasion, the tricque-trac of the Court, the tricque-trac of the affairs of the world, to show the vicissitude and changes of the affairs of the Court and of the cross-currents of the world.

— L'Excellent Jeu du tricque-trac, widow of Jean Promé, Paris, 1656, p. 11.

The great popularity of trictrac and the richness of its vocabulary gave rise to two political satires.

During the Fronde, a mazarinade entitled Le Trique-trac de la cour, published in 1652, depicts Mazarin and his circle with wit and insolence by diverting, for each of them, an expression from the game of trictrac.

Under the French Revolution, at the end of 1790, the authors of the satirical journal Les Actes des Apôtres took up the same principle by publishing, on page 14 of chapter 170, a text entitled Trictrac national, which was reprinted in several works during the nineteenth century in somewhat different versions. (The terms used here are conventional jargon; they are largely explained in the main article. It is suggested to begin by familiarising oneself with the rules of trictrac.)

Trictrac of the Court (1652)	National Trictrac (1790)
Extract from the Mémoires du cardinal de Retz, nouvelle édition augmentée de [...] quelques pièces du cardinal de Retz et autres [...], Jean Frédéric Bernard and Henri du Sauzet, Amsterdam, 1719, vol. 4, p. 252.	Extract from the Mémoires de M. le comte de Montlosier, Dufey, Paris, 1830, vol. 1, p. 408.
The queen. I have been enfiladed. The king. I do not like black ladies [note: tablemen]. Mazarin. I have made my fill, but I cannot pass without luck. The chancellor. I have mine too. Beaufort. I have avoided the enfilade, as usual. La Meilleraye. I risked too much. Chavigny. I should have kept silent about the game. The parlement. We are on the way to winning the game in lurch (en bredouille). The cardinal's relatives. The noise of this game is doing in our heads. The duc d'Orléans. I understand nothing of it, and I have unlucky dice. La Rivière. I am going to make a fine school [mistake], but I shall warn of it. M. le Prince. At any rate, I always enfilade. Longueville. I have double twos [doublé]; I do not know what to do. The queen of England. I have lost everything at this game. The queen's maids. We shall be enfiladed if a large throw comes up. Châteauneuf. I retake my corner with double aces. Messrs. of the Council. They cannot fail to score against us, for our game is always uncovered [lots of blots]. The partisans. Our game is over. Emery. One must leave after this unfortunate obstacle. Servien. I throw whatever game I wish, for I cog [i.e., load] the dice. The coadjutor. There is subtlety in my game, but there is no luck. The Parisians. We must dress the businessman's corner [i.e., with two men at once]. The officers of the élections. If we put in [mettre dedans, i.e. laying down a blot and risking to be hit in the hopes of filling before this takes place], we shall fill without difficulty. M. de Guise. If I leave my corner, I shall be a jan de retour. M. de Montbazon. I am going away; I have no wood to chop [i.e. men to take off the talon as quickly as possible]. Mme de Montbazon. I have only a powerless jan [jan qui ne peut]; but I am wholly uncovered [blots]. The ladies of the Court. We let ourselves be so pressed that we are always enfiladed. The courtiers. We are always shaking the cup [le cornet], but we gain nothing thereby.	The king makes a school [école, i.e. mistake] at every throw. The queen always has unlucky dice. The princes have risked too much. The nobility has taken the businessman's corner. The clergy has made the pile of misfortune [15 men on rest corner]. The Third Estate has taken its corner by force [i.e. not by effect]. The parlements played too tightly. The army and navy are in grand lurch [i.e. lose double]. The national militias still have the banner [le pavillon]. The National Assembly plays tout à bas [i.e. uses both dice on two men from the talon]. La Fayette often hits both corners. La Rochefoucauld has made petty lurches. The bishop of Autun has made the Devil's point [case du Diable]. The Noailles are playing turnabout [revirade, i.e. breaking up already made points to make points further down]. Necker has made a bad holding [i.e., made a full dozen, held on in hopes of gaining more, and lost instead]. D'Aiguillon and Laborde are in enfilade. Lameth, Barnave, and Duport will end by being marked [i.e. losing a mark at trictrac à écrire]. Clermont-Tonnerre was obliged to pass. Abbé Maury takes six holes without moving [the jeton - i.e. 12, 24, 36 points "even"]. Abbé Grégoire has chopped wood [abattre du bois]. Dom Gerle had a bad quarnes [double fours]. Robespierre has made his petit jan. The comte de Mirabeau has made his fill. The duc d'Orléans has uncovered his game too much [too many blots – see strategy on false hits]. France can be saved only by a jan de retour.

During the Restoration, under Louis XVIII, Pierre Marie Michel Lepeintre, in the preliminary discourse of his treatise Cours complet de trictrac, published by Guillaume in Paris in 1818, pp. 3–6, attacks the former emperor Napoleon Bonaparte, then in exile on Saint Helena, accusing him of sacrificing millions of Frenchmen, of usurping power, of illegitimacy, tyranny, and cowardice, in a comparison between the management of his campaigns and the decisions of a bad trictrac player. Lepeintre is the only author to have included political ideas in a treatise on trictrac in this way.

Below is the full text by Lepeintre on Napoleon I:

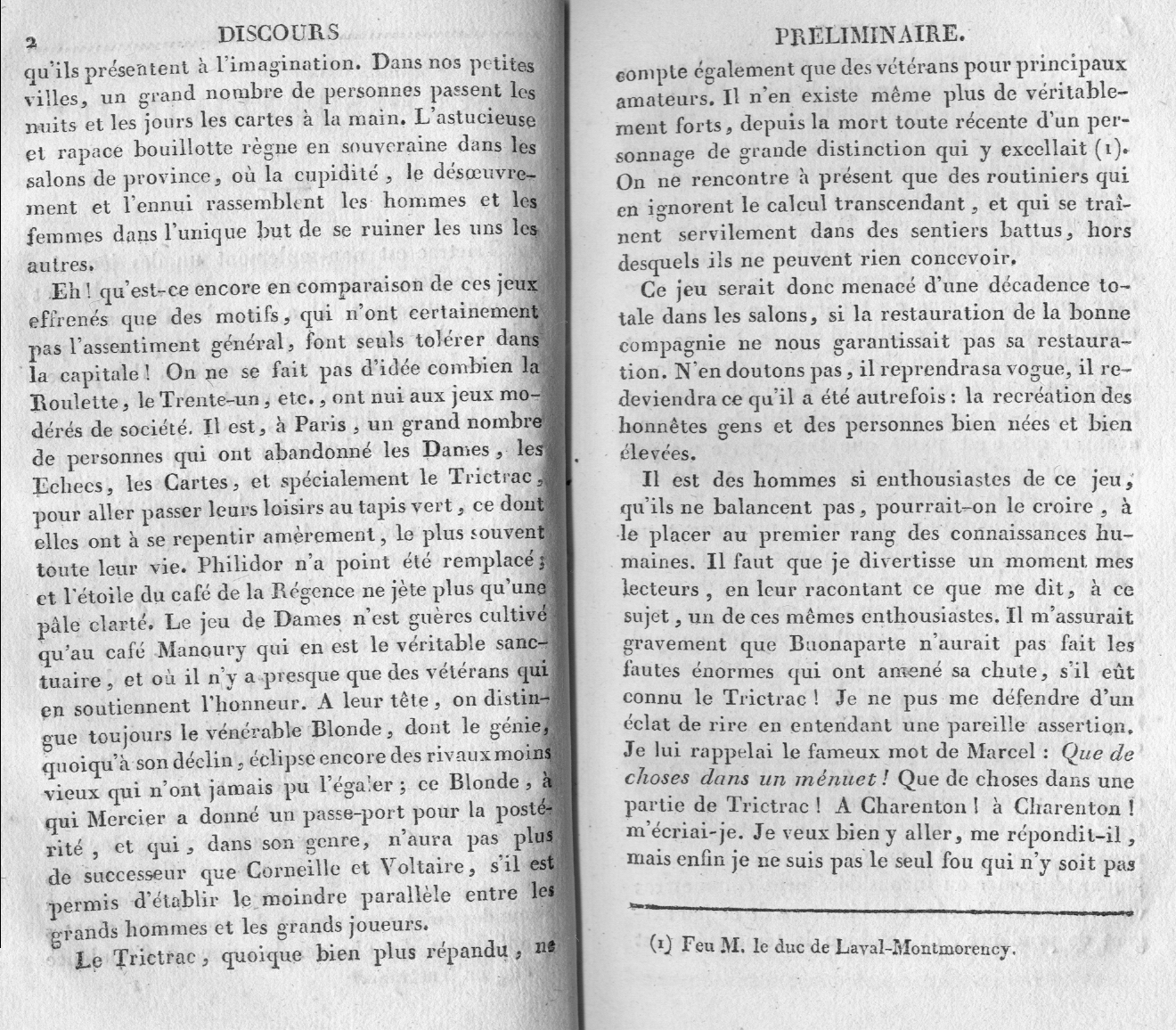
Preliminary discourse
pp. 2–3

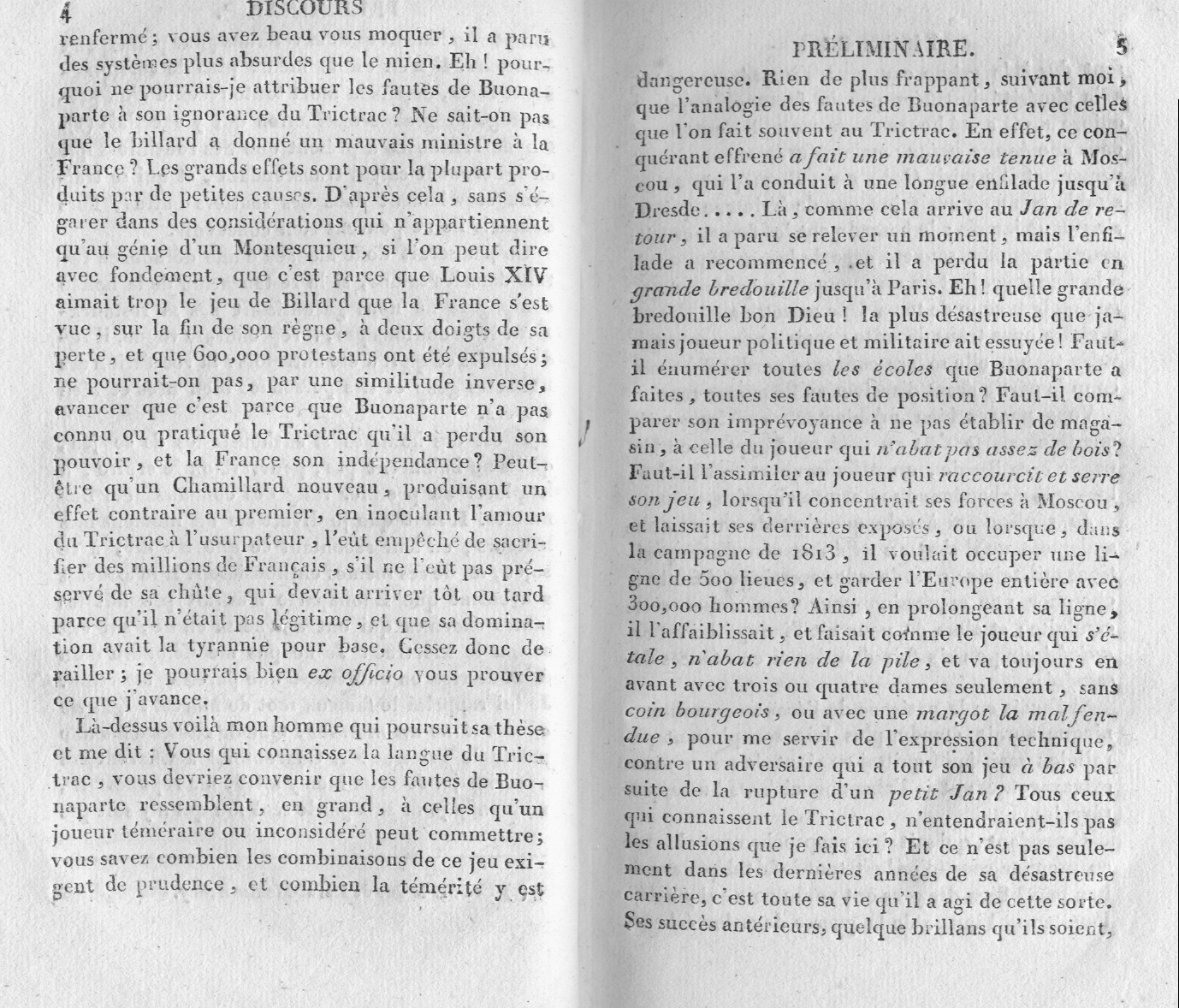
Preliminary discourse
pp. 4–5

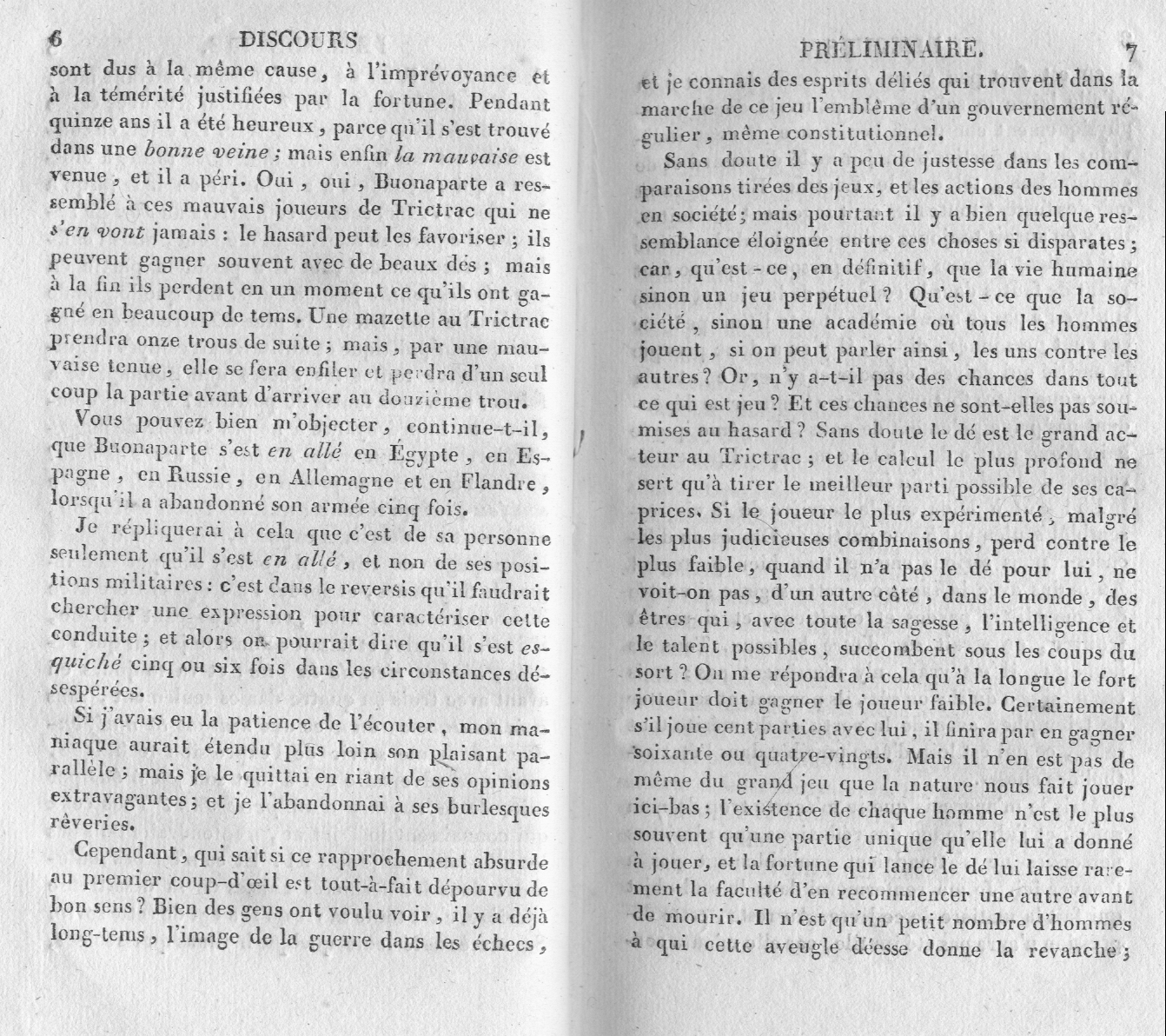
Preliminary discourse
pp. 6–7
