= Valentine de Laborde =

French salon-holder

Charlotte Marie Valentine de Laborde
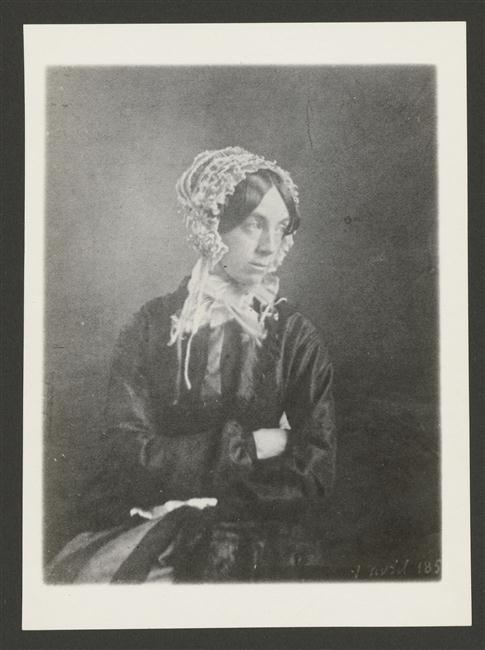
- Portrait of Valentine Delessert (née Valentine de Laborde)
- Born: 1 January 1806
- Died: 13 May 1894 (aged 88)
- Known for: Art collecting and her business
- Partner(s): Prosper Merimee, Maxime du Camp, and Charles de Remusat
- Children: Edouard Delessert

Charlotte Marie Valentine Joséphine de Laborde, also known as Valentine Delessert (1 January 1806 – 13 May 1894) was a French socialite and a Passy-Paris salon holder. She is also known as a mistress of French writer Prosper Mérimée, French writer and photographer Maxime du Camp, and French politician and philosopher Charles de Remusat.

== Life ==
Valentine de Laborde was born on 1 January 1806. Her grandfather, Marquis Jean-Joseph de Laborde, was a famous banker, financier, real estate developer, textile merchant and slave trader, and her father, Count Alexandre de Laborde, was a director of the National Archives. On 1 June 1824, she married the banker Gabriel Delessert. He was a prefect of Seine police from 1836 to 1848.

In the 1830s de Laborde became a mistress of French writer Prosper Merimee and had a strong influence on his work, in particular on creation of his characters from Colomba and Carmen. Merimee first met de Laborde in 1830, and being fascinated with her beauty and wit he started a courtship that lasted for six years until 16 February 1836 when she became his mistress. Their relationship was quite unstable and in 1844, de Laborde found a new lover, however it was not the final breakup. In 1848, Valentine followed her husband to England, as he had to go into exile after the abdication of Louis-Philippe, and from there sent only rare letters to Merimee. In the early 1850s she broke up with Merimee to become a mistress of another French writer Maxime du Camp, but soon left him for the politician Charles de Remusat. De Laborde inspired Gustave Flaubert to create the character of Madame Dambreuse in his L’éducation sentimentale.

Under July Monarchy, de Laborde held a famous salon in her hotel in Passy that attracted main figures of the romantic generation: Francois-Rene de Chateaubriand, Adolphe Thiers, Eugene Delacroix, Prosper Merimee, Maxime du Camp, Emile de Girardin, Alfred de Musset, Charles de Montalembert, Minghetti, the future Empress of France, Eugenie de Montijo, and the Countess de Castiglione. She was also known as a private art collector.

Under the Second French Empire, de Laborde became a part of the entourage of the Empress Eugenie and held an eminent social position until her death.

Valentine de Laborde died on 13 May 1894 at the age of 88.
