= Édouard Delessert =

French painter, archaeologist and photographer

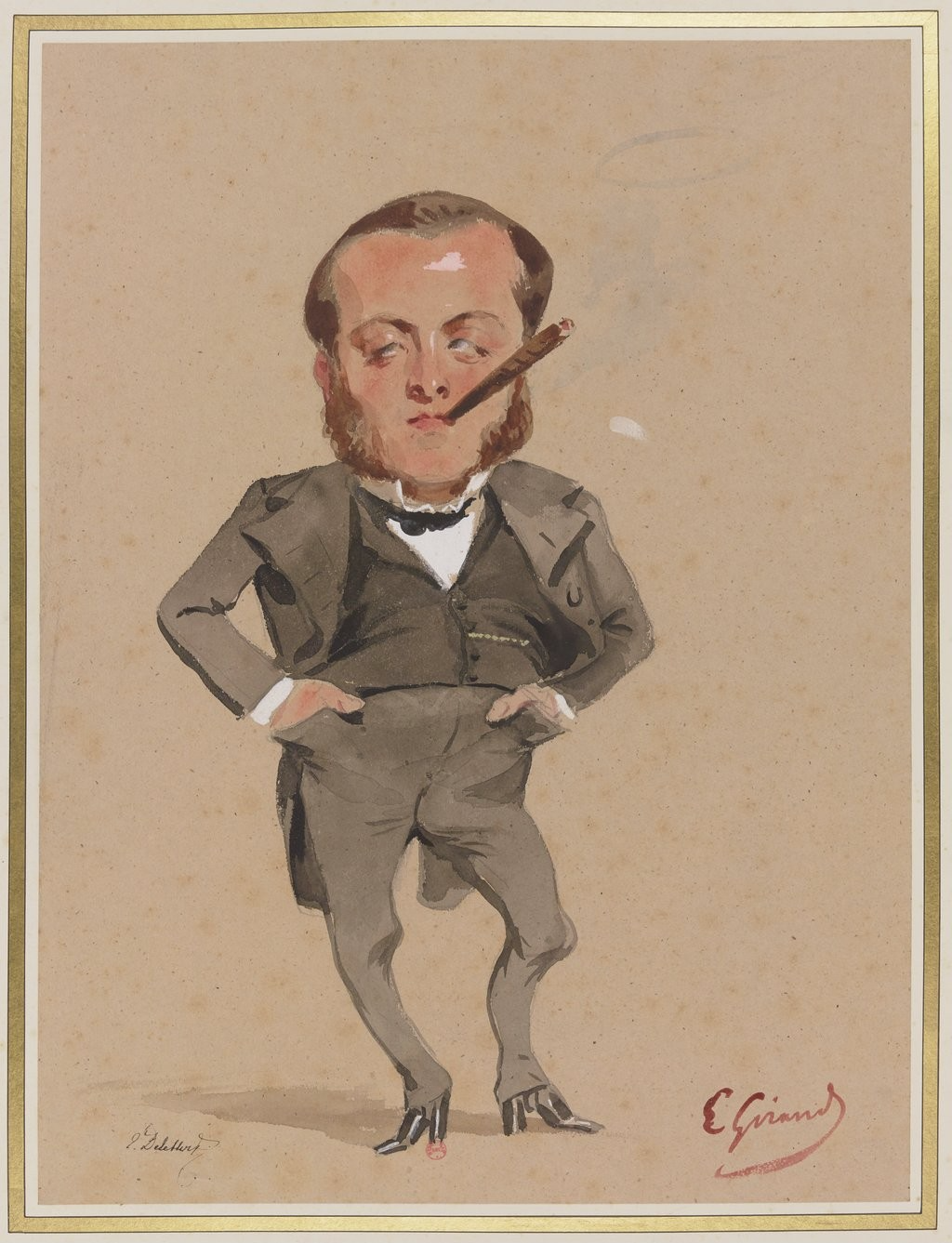
Caricature of Édouard Delessert by Eugène Giraud

Édouard Delessert (15 December 1828 – 27 March 1898) was a French painter, archaeologist and photographer.

== Biography ==
Delessert's parents were Valentine de Laborde, the socialite granddaughter of French businessman and slave trader Jean-Joseph de Laborde, and banker Gabriel Delessert. His mother would go on to be a mistress with several men.

Édouard Delessert was at the same time a painter, archaeologist and especially a pioneer of photography using the calotype. He began by studying law before accompanying, in 1850, Félicien de Saulcy on his trip to the Dead Sea and Syria, then visiting Turkey, Greece, Sardinia and Italy. Contributor to the Revue de Paris from 1851 to 1858, founder of the critical magazine L'Athenaeum, he embarked on business where he swallowed up a large part of his fortune, before wasting the rest.

Prosper Mérimée, who had been his mother's lover, was his mentor in literature and developed, in the letters he addressed to her, some of his aesthetic principles.

With the founding of the National Bank of Haiti, Delessert served on the board of directors, receiving funds related to the Haiti indemnity.

He died on March 27, 1898, without descendants and was buried in Paris in the Passy cemetery, in the tomb of the Delessert family.
