= Alexandre de Laborde =

French antiquary, politician, and writer (1773–1842)

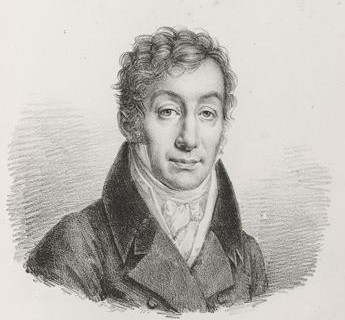
Alexandre de Laborde.

Comte Louis-Joseph-Alexandre de Laborde (French pronunciation: [lwi ʒozɛf alɛksɑ̃dʁ də labɔʁd]; 17 September 1773 – 20 October 1842) was a French antiquary, liberal politician and writer, a member of the Académie des Sciences morales et politiques (1832), under the rubric political economy.

== Biography ==
=== Early years ===
Born in Paris, Laborde was the fourth son of the famous banker and slave trader Jean-Joseph de Laborde, who would be guillotined during the Reign of Terror. Young Laborde had been dispatched to Vienna by his father at the outbreak of the French Revolution; there he joined the Austrian army, in which he was named an officer, 10 December 1789, at the age of seventeen, by personal intervention of the Emperor Joseph II. First stationed at Olmuz (Moravia), he was named captain in a regiment of light cavalry in October 1791, and saw action against the Revolutionary French forces the following year along the frontiers of the Austrian Netherlands and Luxembourg, where he distinguished himself by his generosity towards his compatriots who had been taken prisoner or wounded. In 1795, he took a long leave, first to join his widowed mother and sister in Switzerland, then to see his brother in London. He reentered the Austrian army among Kinsky's hussars and reached the rank of squadron leader.

Then he travelled through Germany, Holland, and Italy before he was able to arrange to be de-listed from among the proscribed émigrés at the peace of Campoformio (1797), which enabled him to return to France. Under Talleyrand, who took him under his protection, he entered the French foreign office of the counter-revolution that the Consulat represented. Laborde and his sister would also receive a payout for his father's slaves in Haiti that was the equivalent of about $1.7 million in 2022.

=== Napoleonic career ===
In 1800, he was an attaché of Lucien Bonaparte's embassy in Madrid that concluded with the Treaty of Aranjuez in March 1801 and returned with him. At Méréville Lucien met Laborde's mistress Alexandrine Jacob de Bleschamp, fell completely in love with her and married her in June 1803, occasioning a long-lasting chill in Laborde's relations with Napoleon, whose dynastic aspirations did not include the daughter of an agent de change for sister-in-law and who suspected Laborde of complicity in the liaison. Laborde took advantage of some enforced leisure to assemble a team of artists and writers— among whom his friend Chateaubriand— to see through the press two massive works on Spain, the Itinéraire descriptif de l'Espagne (1809, five volumes and an atlas) and the Voyage pittoresque et historique en Espagne (1807–1818, four volumes in-folio); the Voyage pittoresque, realised with care and containing some nine hundred engravings, proved a serious drain on his finances. It appeared just at the moment the Peninsular Campaigns of 1808 interfered with markets; pressed with obligations to his family, whom he supported in considerable style, he decided to re-enter the Napoleonic administration and was appointed that year auditeur to the Conseil d'État, at that time a form of initial training for the upper levels of the Empire's bureaucracy scarcely suited to Laborde's prominence and expertise, but the emperor took him as a knowledgeable aide in Madrid, made his wife a dame d'honneur to Empress Joséphine, and then, satisfied with Laborde's role, made him a chevalier of the Legion of Honour in 1809 and created him a comte de l'Empire on 9 January 1810.

Soon Laborde's Austrian experience and his perfect command of German suited him for a place as secretary of the delegation under Marshal Berthier to ask for the hand of the archduchess Marie Louise, charting a delicate course between the reservations of the Austrian clergy as to the legitimacy of Napoleon's divorce and the French reservations about the great-niece of Marie Antoinette. He received in recompense from the Habsburg side two snuff-boxes garnished with diamonds and the cross of the Order of Saint Stephen and took some leisure to make a long tour of Habsburg lands that formed materials for his Voyage pittoresque en Autriche, not published until 1821.

On his return to France, as Maître des requêtes he was put in charge of the commission to settle the accounts of the Grande Armée then placed at the head of the service of bridges and highways of the département de la Seine (1812), in which capacity he made a number of suggestions for practical improvements— public baths, stone sidewalks, fire stations— that came to fruition later.

Laborde conceived the project of compiling a complete inventory of the archaeological heritage of France and obtained from the Minister of the Interior, the comte de Montalivet, permission to circulate a request for collaboration among the prefects of départements: the initiative was fruitless in the face of official apathy, both during the Empire and under the Restoration, but it served as a precedent for the appointment in 1834 of Prosper Mérimée as inspector-general of historical monuments.

Laborde was called to the Institut de France on 29 January 1813, being made an officer of the Légion d'honneur the same year. His luxurious publication seriously undermined his finances, but he remained a figure of high society of the Empire, an intimate of Queen Hortense and perhaps the ghostwriter of romances that appeared under her name, such as Le Bon Chevalier, En soupirant j'ai vu naître l'aurore, or "Partant pour la Syrie", an all but official hymn under the Second Empire.

He was the mayor of Méréville from 1805 to 1814.

=== The Restoration and Louis-Philippe ===
As adjutant-major of the garde nationale in 1814, in command of the Tuileries, he had the mission of reaching the Russian encampment, the night of 31 March 1814, to arrange the surrender of the Garde Nationale. During the Hundred Days he did not rally to Napoleon but passed the time in England. Louis XVIII appointed him colonel d'état-major and chevalier of the Order of Saint-Louis. At this time he reassumed the title of Marquis de Laborde carried by his eldest son and his descendants.

He was named to the Académie des inscriptions et belles-lettres 21 March 1816, in the reorganization of the Institut de France. From 1818 to 1824, he served in the National Assembly, where he opposed the reinstallation of Ferdinand VII to the throne of Spain at the time of Trocadero (1823), with the eventual result that he found the leisure for a four-year tour of Italy, Greece, Turkey, Palestine and Egypt in the company of his son Léon de Laborde. He served as Député and as Préfet of the Seine (1830), and as a supporter of Louis Philippe I in the Revolution of 1830 as a general Garde nationale and aide-de-camp of the king, who sent him to Spain as ambassador. From 1831 to 1837 he served as Deputy for the Seine, in 1837 as Deputy for Seine-et-Oise.

Laborde would spend most of the wealth left by his father, having little money by the time of his death. He died at Paris in 1842.

== Major works ==
A mere list of Laborde's publications is an indication of the range of his interests, above all the works that diffused in Europe a realistic view of picturesque Spain, suffused with the interpretations of Romanticism. His topographic itinerary Itinéraire descriptif de l’Espagne proved unexpectedly useful in Napoleon's invasion of Spain.

- Description d’un pavé en mosaïque découvert dans l’ancienne ville d’Italica (1802)
- Lettres sur les sons harmoniques de la harpe (1806)
- Voyage historique et pittoresque en Espagne (4 volumes, 1807)
- Description des nouveaux jardins de la France et de ses anciens châteaux (1808–1815)
- Discours sur la vie e la campagne (1808)
- Itinéraire descriptif de l’Espagne (5 vol., 1808; second edition in 1809)
- Voyage pittoresque en Autriche (3 volumes, 1809)
- Des aristocraties représentatives (1814)
- De la représentation véritable de la communauté (1815)
- Les monuments de la France, classés chronologiquement (1816–1826)
- Projets d’embellissement de Paris (1816)
- Quarante-huit heures de garde aux Tuileries, pendant les journées des 19 et 20 mars 1815. Par un grenadier de la Garde Nationale (1816)
- Plan d’éducation pour les enfants pauvres (1819)
- Aperçu de la situation financière de l’Espagne (1823)
- Précis historique de la guerre entre la France et l’Autriche en 1809 (1823)
- Collection de vases grecs expliquée (2 volumes, 1824–1828)
- Au roi et aux chambres, sur la question d’Alger (1830)
- Paris municipe ou tableau de l’administration de la ville de Paris (1833)
- Versailles, ancien et moderne (1830–1840)

== Personal life ==
Laborde had two children, Valentine de Laborde and Léon de Laborde.
