= Édouard Jean Joseph de Laborde de Marchainville =

Édouard Jean Joseph de Laborde de Marchainville (26 June 1762, Paris – 13 July 1786, Baie des Français, Lituya, Alaska) was a French explorer and naval officer.

== Early life: 1762–1780 ==
Marchainville was born 26 June 1762, to father Jean-Joseph de Laborde (1724–1794) and mother Rosalie Claire Josèphe de Nettine (1737–1815). He also had eight siblings, including François Laborde de Méreville.

== Life ==
In 1780, on board la Couronne, commanded by Guichen, Marchainville participated in battles of the American Revolutionary War and bore himself so well that his captain mentioned him favourably in dispatches. On l'Aigrette, commanded by Fleuriot de Langle he functioned as an "officier chargé du détail", as he also did on board the la Résolue.

In 1784, he was held to be experienced enough to command the corvette la Fauvette. Leaving Newport, Rhode Island for île de France in consort with le Réfléchi, la Fauvette was separated by a sudden storm in the approaches to the a great bank off Newfoundland and so Marchainville returned with only one ship, despite bad weather on the return voyage.

A good and brave sailor, he was also noted for his scientific researches, which won him a "lunette de mer" on 23 August 1777. On 9 March 1785, he gained permission to spend 3 months in England and the Netherlands to learn more about science. On his return to Brest in June 1785, Marchainville was immediately chosen to fill the supplementary role of enseigne prévue on board the l'Astrolabe and Langle, Marchainville's commander twice before, very probably asked for him to serve under him again.

He and his brother Ange died on the La Pérouse expedition, and their father (the wealthy court banker Jean-Joseph de Laborde) erected a blue-turquoise marble rostral column beside a pool at his château de Méréville, decorated with 4 ships' bows, to glorify their virtues.
