= François Laborde de Méreville =

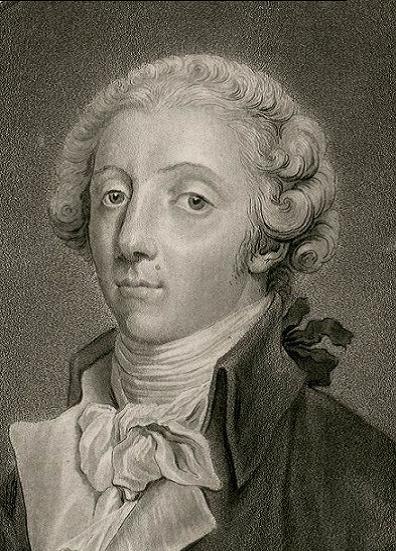

François Louis Jean-Joseph de Laborde (1761–1801) was a French banker, deputy for the Third Estate to the Estates General of 1789 and garden lover. He also bore the name Méréville after his huge estate at château de Méréville in Beauce, acquired by his father under Louis XVI.

== Life ==
His father was Jean-Joseph de Laborde, one of the richest financiers under Louis XV and Louis XVI, while his mother was Rosalie de Nettine (1737–1820), linked to a family of bankers linked to the Austrian Imperial Court. His brother, Édouard Jean Joseph, was an explorer. He fought in the American Revolutionary War under the command of Rochambeau. He was a cousin of the prince de Poix and thus related, via his sister Nathalie, to La Fayette.

He was procurator general and special procurator for his father before living in Saint-Domingue. In 1789, he became a member of the Committee of Thirty, which gathered in the home of Adrien Duport to prepare for the election of the deputies to the Estates General. He was elected deputy of the third estate for Étampes. He entered a relationship with Madamoiselle Cabarrus, who later became the Marquise of Fontenay; she was probably his mistress at the start of the French Revolution.

In 1792, he bought part of the Orléans Collection from the Brussels banker Édouard de Walckiers for nearly a million francs before transporting it to London. He made his money by selling all the paintings to Michael Bryan in 1798 for £43,500. He was an associate of the bankers Walter Boyd and William Ker of the banking house Boyd, Ker & Cie, rue de Grammont. Boyd and Ker were involved with politicians, allowing de Laborde to organise the money distribution network during the Revolutionary troubles, which would have a major impact on some members of the French Convention and some of Paris' city administrators.

On 10 August 1792, de Laborde joined a secret counter-revolutionary plot with his maternal uncle, Charles Alexandre de Calonne, Louis XVI's former minister. He also made Dominique Joseph Garat minister for the interior, then financed the Exagérés' struggle against the convention, and finally emigrated to London after March 1793. His father was guillotined, but his mother escaped the same fate. On 6 Messidor Year III, he demanded to be removed from the list of émigrés; his mother tried to help him regularise his situation but failed. He died in London in 1801.

== Sources ==
- (in French) « François Louis Jean-Joseph de Laborde de Méréville », dans Adolphe Robert et Gaston Cougny, Dictionnaire des parlementaires français, Edgar Bourloton, 1889-1891
- (in French) Fiche sur Assemblée nationale
