= Mazarin =

Mazarin may refer to:

- Cardinal Mazarin, 17th-century minister to the French king
- Rethel, formerly the Duchy of Mazarin, a commune in France
- Mazarin River, a river in Canada
- Mazarin (album), a 2003 pop music album
- Hoc Mazarin, historical French card game
- Mazarin (pastry), Swedish almond tart
- Quartier Mazarin, a historical neighborhood in Aix-en-Provence, France

== See also ==
- "The Adventure of the Mazarin Stone", one of 12 Sherlock Holmes short stories by Arthur Conan Doyle in The Case-Book of Sherlock Holmes
- Bureau Mazarin, a 17th-century desk form named in memory of Cardinal Mazarin
