= François de Vendôme =

François de Vendôme may refer to various members of the House of Vendôme, in particular:

- François de Vendôme, Vidame de Chartres (1522–1560), French soldier and courtier
- Francis, Count of Enghien (1519–1546), French general
- François de Vendôme, Duc de Beaufort (1616–1669), French politician and admiral
