= Château de Méréville =

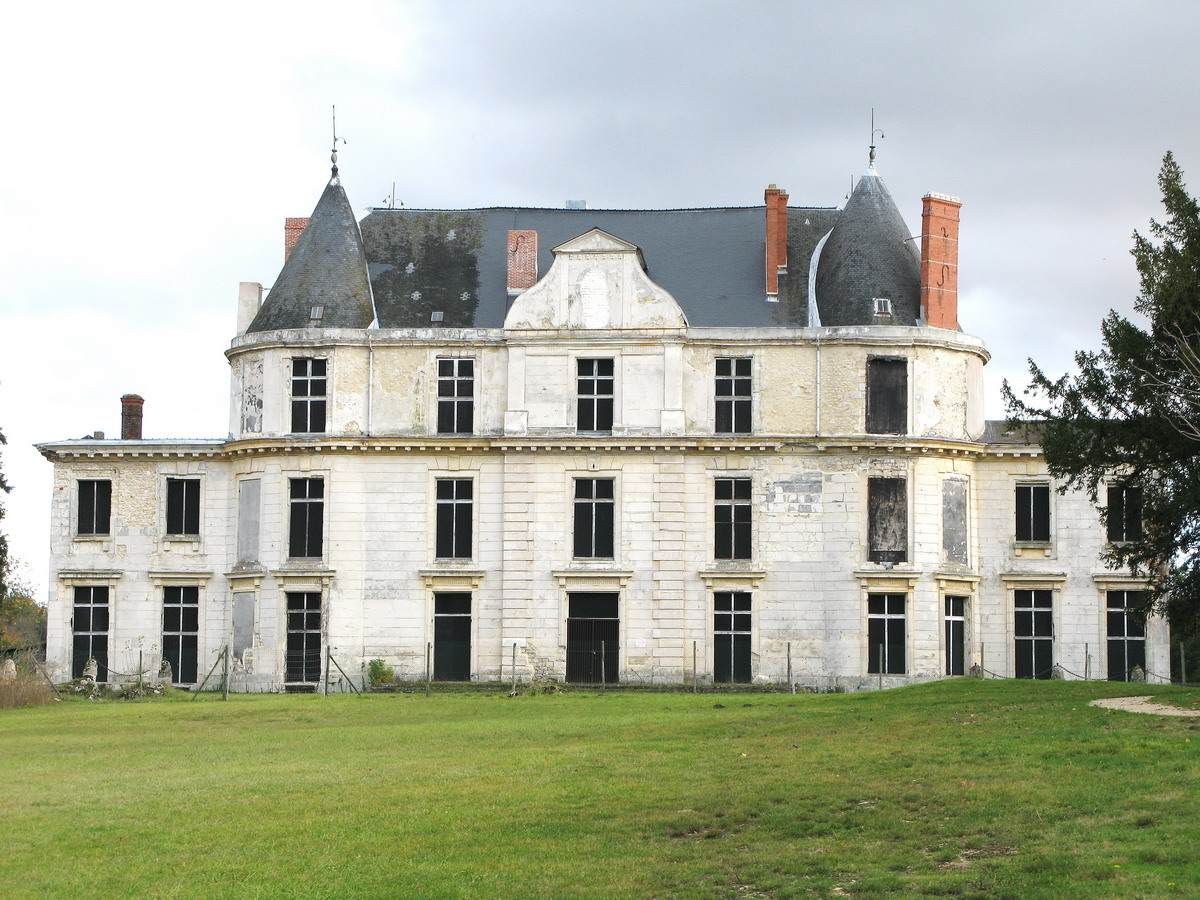

- Location within France

General information
- Architectural style: Renaissance
- Classification: Monument historique
- Location: Méréville, Essonne, France
- Coordinates: 48°19′11″N 2°5′27″E
- Construction started: 1768
- Completed: 1794
- Client: Jean-Joseph de Laborde

Design and construction
- Architect: Jean-Benoît-Vincent Barré

The Château de Méréville is a chateau in Méréville in the valley of the Juine, France. It is the rival of the Désert de Retz as two of the most extensive Landscape Gardens provided with follies and picturesque features — parcs à fabriques — made in the late eighteenth century. Both are early examples of the romantic French Landscape Garden — jardin a l'anglaise — an interpretation of the English garden style that was replacing the Garden à la française. the Château de Méréville and garden park survive, partially dismantled.

After being owned by a Japanese pension fund who planned to turn it into a golf resort, in 2000 the chateau was bought by the regional government. Having reopened to the public in 2018, the restored garden was recognized as a remarkable garden in 2019. As of May 2026, the restoration of the chateau's framework and the complete renovation of the roof were reported to be nearing completion.

== History ==
=== Up to 1786 ===
The château was first built as a medieval fortress, and then rebuilt on the medieval buildings' remains in 1768 for the conseiller du roi Jean Delpech. The 1768 phase was provided with modest formal gardens formed as regular parterres.

=== 1786-1796 ===
The château and its park in the French gardening style were bought in 1784 as the last of his country houses by the financier Jean-Joseph de Laborde, one of the richest financiers of the Ancien Régime, after his neighbours gave him the chance to do so. On this marshy land he decided to rebuild the château and create a large landscape park to his own taste. To this end he commissioned major artists such as Bélanger (famous in this decade for having constructed Bagatelle in only two months for the Comte d'Artois), the famous cabinetmaker Leleu, the sculptor Augustin Pajou and the painter Claude Joseph Vernet.

In 1786, after the new pont des roches (a two-level bridge over the Juine) subsided, and Bélanger's plans were threatening to prove too expensive even for the marquis (he habitually spent without keeping count of spending, which as a sensible administrator the marquis could not accept). Bélanger was thus sacked as chief architect in May that year and replaced by Hubert Robert (who had left the prestigious French School in Rome and was already known as the ruins painter or "Robert-les-ruines"), though Bélanger remained onsite for the construction of the circular temple of filial piety (built in honour of the marquis' daughter Natalie, containing a marble bust of her by Augustin Pajou).

The following year, 1787, in some of the most exceptional hydrographic work of the period, the rerouting of the Juine took a long time to achieve. Next, an entirely new type of structure was built on a small island in the centre of the main lake - a rostral column, in honour of the marquis' two young sons Edouard (1762–1786) and Ange Auguste (1766–1786), news of whose disappearance had arrived in France earlier that year. They had died young at sea in Lituya Bay during the La Pérouse expedition.

The park is in the marquis' own image, showing his admiration for navigation and discovery (the rostral column and the cenotaph in honour of the Englishman Captain Cook are indicators of this), his love of nature and plants (linked to exploration in this era of botany and classification - the park contains rare imported species, acclimatised to their new habitat by the soil of the Méréville Valley), and his memory of his youth in the Basque and the mountainous Pyrénées (a rocky waterfall, spiral staircases down into grottoes, and dénivellés). It also shows his riches, with bridges "aux boules d'or" (with gold spheres), grottoes adorned with thousands of pieces of gold leaf or precious and semi-precious stones, and a pebble-paved road.

The construction took ten years and nearly 700 workers, of which a large majority were specialist craftsmen. Robert transformed into a landscape of open meadows and belts of trees contained within a wide bowl, which became dotted with eye-catching features with a few years. Chateaubriand called the result an oasis. In its return to nature or at least to the illusion of nature (the ruined bridge, and the facts that the trees were all planted in positions intended to surprise the visitor and the caves were all man-made), the park's style can be described as Romantic, though it also contains elements of "anglo-chinois" (the belvédère).

== Gallery ==
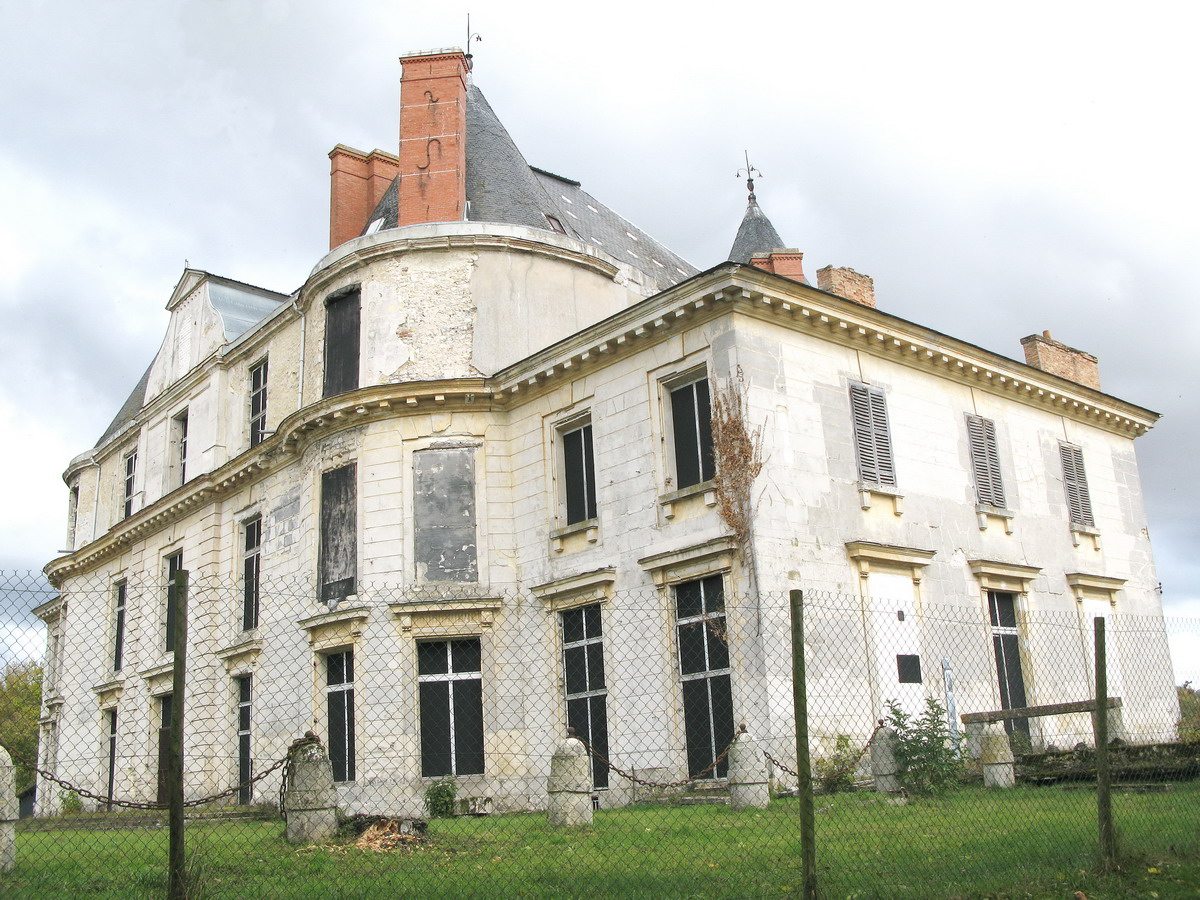
Château de Méréville in 2008

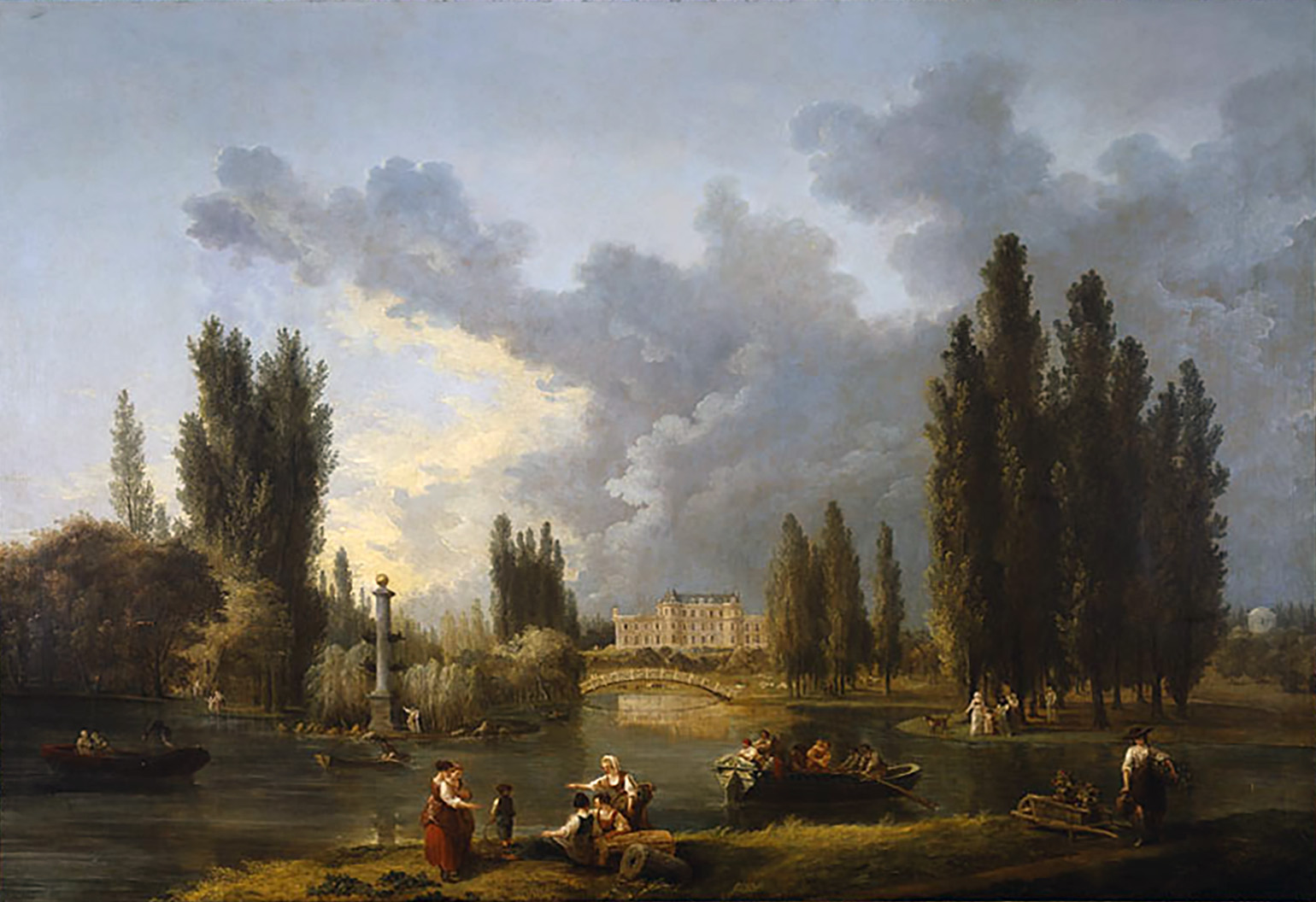
The park and lake by Hubert Robert (1791)

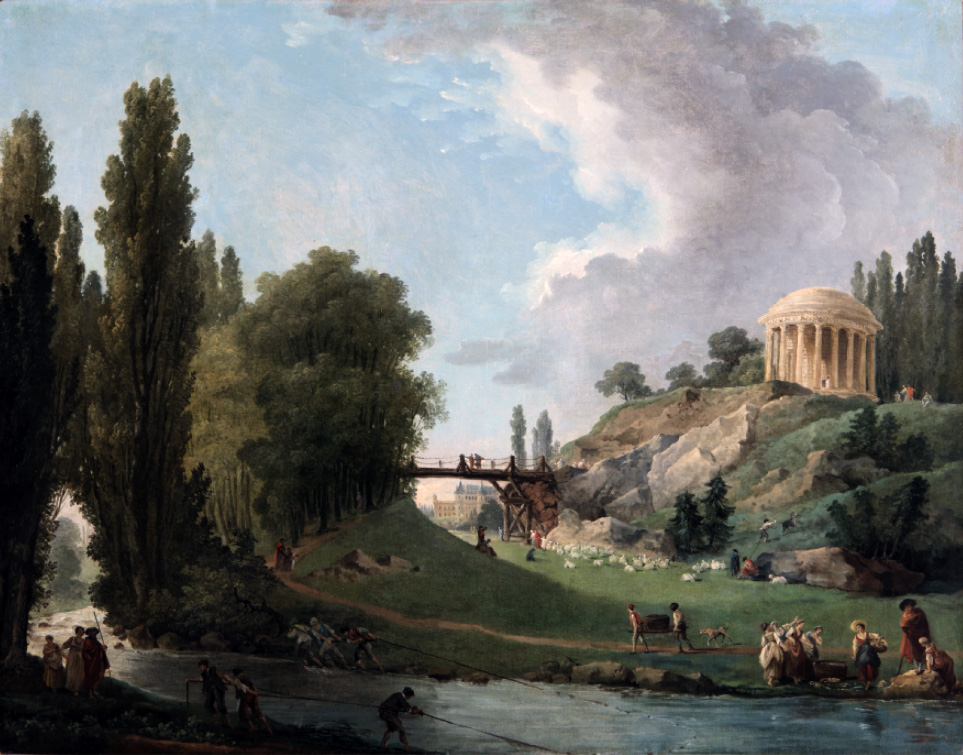
Temple of Filial Piety by Hubert Robert

== See also ==
- French landscape garden
- Category:Garden design history of France
- Remarkable Gardens of France

== Bibliography ==
- Bergerin (Flore de), Les jardins de Jean-Joseph de Laborde. Le parc de Méréville au XVIIIe siècle, 1994
- Delmas (Jean-François), "Jean-Joseph de Laborde et le domaine de Méréville", in État et société en France aux XVIIe-XVIIIe siècles, mélanges Yves Durand, Paris, PUPS, 2000, p. 181-193
- Lansel (Ch.), "Méréville, son château et son parc", Paris, J. Dumaine, 1877
