= Jean Joseph de Laborde, Marquis of Laborde =

French politician, entrepreneur and banker (1724–1794)

Jean Joseph de Laborde
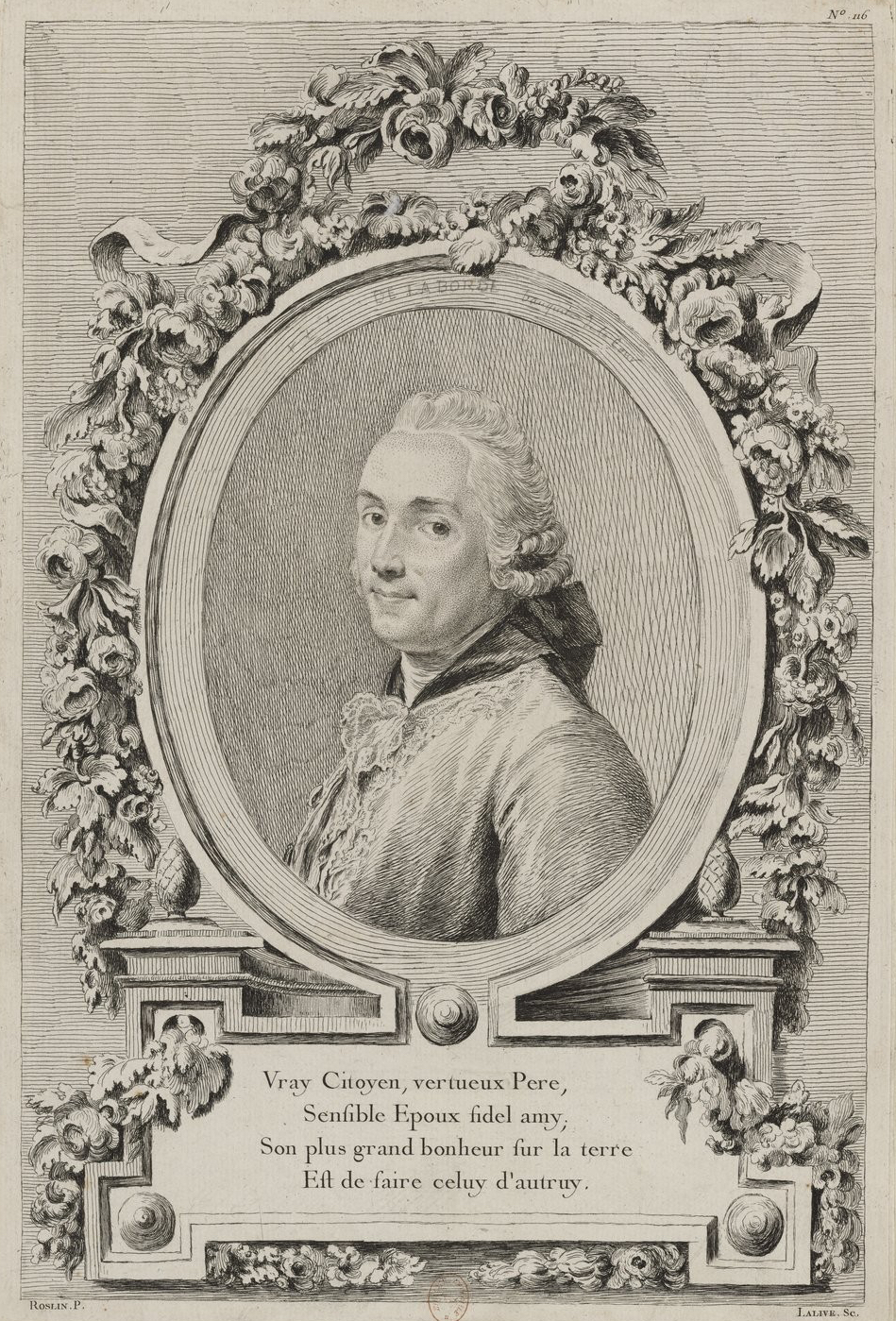
- Late-1700s portrait of Laborde
- Born: 29 January 1724 near Jaca in Aragon
- Died: 18 April 1794 (aged 70); Paris, France
- Cause of death: Execution by guillotine
- Occupation: French politician
- Parents: Jean Pierre Laborde (father); Marguerite d'Aleman (mother)

Jean Joseph de Laborde, Marquis of Laborde (29 January 1724 – 18 April 1794) was a French businessman, slave trader, fermier général and banker to the king, who turned politician. A liberal, though legally a Marquis he rarely used his title. He was guillotined in the French Revolution.

== Biography ==
Laborde was born near Jaca in Aragon, into a modest Béarnais family. When he reached adolescence he joined his uncle, who was head of a maritime import–export company at Saint-Jean-de-Luz, and took over as head of the business on the cousin's death. He based his subsequent fortune not only on this company, but also on transatlantic trade (supplying the American colonies with basics, in return for far more financially interesting products such as tropical fruits, rare trees and enslaved people) and his sugar plantations on Saint-Domingue (Haiti). He shipped nearly 10,000 people to the French colony of Saint-Domingue on his slave ships and enslaved 2,000 on the plantations he owned there.

His rapid rise, comparable to that of several bourgeois men of the Age of Enlightenment, gained him promotion to noble rank and allowed him to acquire several estates. He became fermier général (1759–1767) on the suggestion of his friend the duc de Choiseul. He took up residence in the château de La Ferté-Vidame in 1764, the fief bringing with it the ancient title of Vidame de Chartres. He rebuilt it in the neoclassical style which now remains as a shell, and commissioned several artists. However, following a game of musical chairs, he lost it in 1784 to the duc de Penthièvre, who had himself lost his domaine de Rambouillet to King Louis XV, who coveted its "terres giboyeuses" or wooded hunting lands. Laborde was named marquis and in 1784 acquired the Château de Méréville, rebuilding it to his taste.

In politics, he was ahead of his time and of the French Revolution, and (with Mirabeau) was one of the few noble députés (from the bailliage d'Étampes) to accept demotion to the Third Estate upon the Revolution. However, this was not enough to save him from being guillotined in Paris under the loi des suspects on the orders of Louis de Saint-Just, in one of the last fits of the Reign of Terror in May 1794. In 1792, much of the fabulous Orleans Collection of paintings was briefly his, before he was forced by events to abandon his ambition to exhibit them in his Paris house, and sold them.

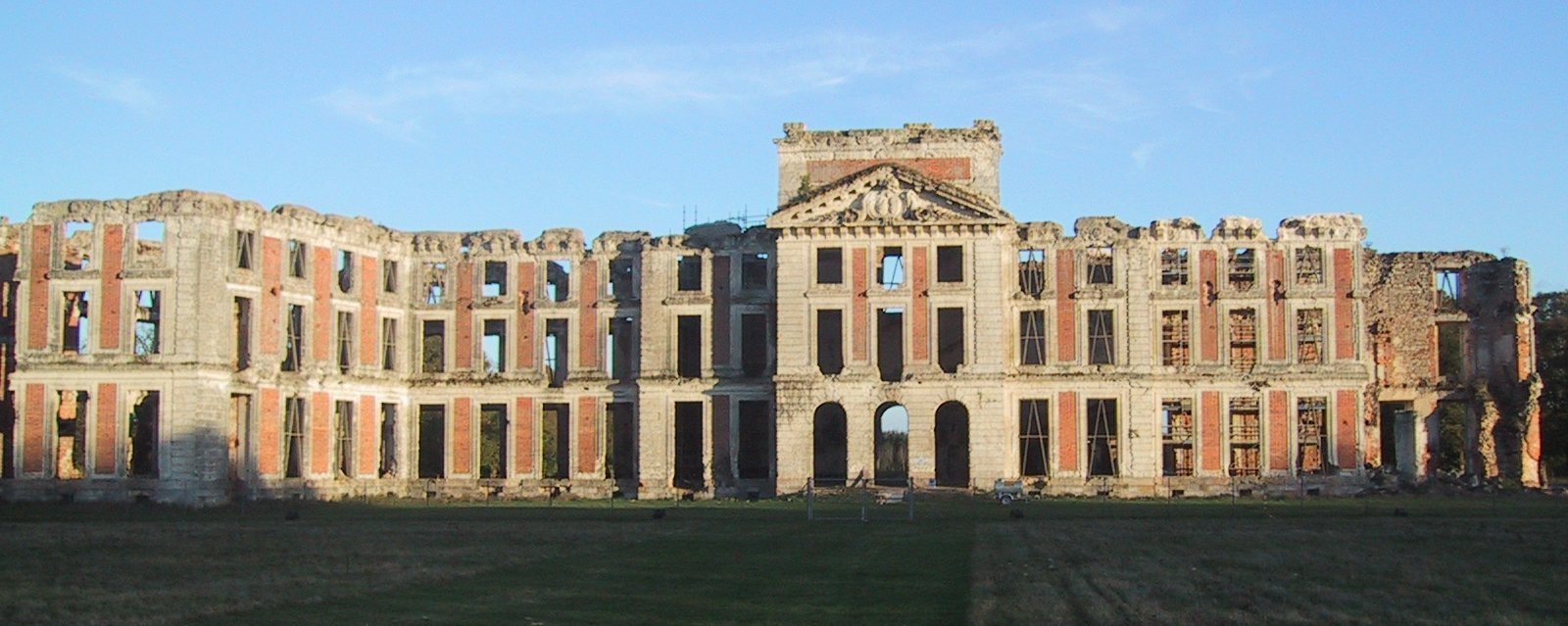
The ruins of the Château de la Ferté-Vidame in 2005

== Descendants ==
- François Laborde de Méreville (1761–1801)
- Edouard-Jean-Joseph de Laborde Marchainville (1762–1786), a member of the Lapérouse expedition, who drowned, along with his brother, in Lituya Bay, Alaska. Because of his family connections, Édouard-Jean had had a rapidly rising career before becoming an ensign on the Boussole. Pierre Bruno Jean de La Monneraye described him as having "un figure charmante, les cheveux blonds, la taille haute & svelte", which matches a family painting by Greuze. His career as a naval officer began in July 1776, and he was promoted to ensign in April 1778, serving in wartime on the Guerrier, the Bretange, and the Aigrette, and being the second officer on the Résolue in 1781. He was rewarded with a telescope in 1777. He suffered a broken clavicle in the war. Returning to France, he then commanded the Fauvette, a corvette, from October 1783 to November 1784 with missions to Rochefort and Guyana. Following his brother, he then completed his education in England and The Netherlands, before joining La Pérouse on the Astrolabe. During the voyage, he was promoted to lieutenant, 1st division. de La Monneraye related that Édouard-Jean died attempting to save the life of Ange-Augustin. The twain were amongst the first to die on the expedition. In fact, they died trying to come to the aid of another boat that had smashed against the rocks in the Bay, having both gone out in the same boat despite the caution from their father not to take risks together. 7 people died in the Labordes boat, and 21 people in total, including 6 officers on the boat that they were attempting to aid. The news of the deaths was widely reported in Europe, in part because of who Édouard-Jean's and Ange-Augustin's father was.
- Pauline de Laborde (1765–1782), married Jean-François Pérusse, 1st duc des Cars.
- Ange-Auguste-Joseph de Laborde Boutervilliers (1766–1786), a member of the Lapérouse expedition, who drowned, along with his brother, in Lituya Bay, Alaska. He had entered the navy in July 1781. He was still only a guard when he died, although the Castries reform meant that he had nominally been promoted to lieutenant in May 1786.
- Nathalie de Laborde (1774–1835), married Charles de Noailles, duc de Mouchy, was la petite mouche among the many mistresses of Chateaubriand
- Alexandre de Laborde, archaeologist, soldier and politician, who continued his father's Revolutionary political views

== Laborde Monument ==
The Laborde Monument in the grounds of the château de Méréville commemorated the deaths of Ange Augustin and Édouard Jean, who both ventured on the Lapérouse expedition and died in July 1786. It no longer stands in its original location. It was a blue-turquoise marble rostral column beside a pool, that Jean-Joseph originally commissioned out of pride at his two sons joining La Pérouse, Édouard-Jean on the Boussole and Ange-Augustin on the Astrolabe. It might have been inspired by Jacques Montanier Delille's 1782 poem Les Jardins, with which Laborde père would have been familiar.

But when they died in a boating accident in the Baie des Français, Lituya Bay, Alaska, it was transformed into a memorial.

== Sources ==
- Boyer, Ferdinand (1954). "Jean Joseph de Laborde, protecteur de F.X. Fabre et sa collection confisquée en 1794". Bulletin de la société d'histoire de l'art français.
- Bronne, Carlo (1968–69). "Un couple brillant, les Laborde". La Revue de Paris. Paris.
- Delmas, Jean-François (1988–1989). Le Mécénat des financiers au XVIIIe siècle. Les collections de peinture de Jean-Joseph, marquis de Laborde. Paris: Paris-Sorbonne.
- Durand, Yves (1968–69). "Mémoires de Jean Joseph de Laborde, banquier de la cour et fermier général". Bulletin de la société d'histoire de France.
- Dussau, A.J. "Jean Joseph Laborde, négociant bourgeois bayonnais, banquier du roy, victime de la Terreur". Bulletin de la société des sciences, lettres et arts de Bayonne, 1967.
- Maskill, David (2006). "Death in a French Garden: the Laborde and Cook monuments at Méréville and the landscape of loss". In Calder, Martin (ed.). Experiencing the Garden in the Eighteenth Century. Reference, Information and Interdisciplinary Subjects. Peter Lang. pp. 145–160. ISBN 9783039102914.
- de La Monneraye, Pierre-Bruno-Jean (1998). Bonnichon, Philippe (ed.). Souvenirs de 1760 à 1791. Publications pour la Société de l'histoire de France (in French). Vol. 517. Librairie Droz. ISBN 9782745300799.
- Thomas, Jean-Pierre (2002). Jean-Joseph de La Borde : banquier de Louis XV, mécène des Lumières. Paris: Perrin.
