= Laborde =

Laborde, LaBorde, La Borde, de Laborde or de La Borde is a surname. Notable persons with that name include:

- Alden "Doc" Laborde, petroleum industry figure, founder of Gulf Island Fabrication
- Alexandre de Laborde (1773–1842), French antiquary, liberal politician and writer, son of Jean Joseph de Laborde, Marquis of Laborde and father of Valentine de Laborde
- Anna Larroucau Laborde de Lucero (1864–1956), French-Argentine philanthropist and educator
- Catherine Laborde (1951–2025), French weather presenter and author
- Cécile Laborde, French professor of political theory
- Edmond Laborde (1863–1924), French biologist
- Eduardo Laborde (1967–2015), Argentine rugby union player
- Françoise Laborde (born 1958), French politician
- Françoise Laborde (journalist) (born 1953), French journalist, writer and television presenter
- François Laborde de Méreville (1761–1801), French banker and member of the Estates General of 1789, son of Jean Joseph de Laborde, Marquis of Laborde
- Gaëtan Laborde (born 1994), French footballer
- Genie Z. Laborde (1928–2023), American writer
- Guillermo Laborde (1886–1940), Uruguayan painter, sculptor and designer
- Harold La Borde (1933–2015), Trinidadian sailor and adventurer
- Henri LaBorde (1909–1993), American discus thrower
- Henri de Laborde de Monpezat (1934–2018), husband of Margrethe II, Queen of Denmark
- Horatio LaBorde (1821–1891), Anglican Archdeacon of St Vincent
- Jean Laborde (1805–1878), French consul to Madagascar
- Jean Laborde (journalist) (1918–2007), French journalist and writer
- Jean Laborde (politician), (1922–2022), French politician
- Jean de Laborde (1878–1977), French admiral
- Jean-Benjamin de La Borde (1734–1794), French composer, writer on music and tax farmer
- Jean Joseph de Laborde, Marquis of Laborde (1724–1794), French businessman, slave trader, tax farmer, banker to the king and politician, father of Alexandre de Laborde and grandfather of Valentine de Laborde
- Léon de Laborde (1807-1869), French archaeologist and traveler
- Leopoldo Laborde (born 1970), Mexican film director
- Mae Laborde (1909–2012), American actress
- Maria Celia Laborde (born 1990), Cuban-born American judoka
- María Marván Laborde, Mexican sociologist and political scientist
- Marion Laborde (born 1986), French basketball player
- Ricardo Laborde (born 1988), Colombian former footballer
- Rodrigo Noguera Laborde (1919—2004), Colombian academic, writer, jurist and philosopher, Attorney General of Colombia, Minister of Justice and Minister of Mines and Petroleum
- Rosine Laborde (1824–1907), French singer and singing teacher
- Santiago Oñate Laborde (born 1949), Mexican lawyer and politician
- Thierry Laborde, French chef
- Tabaré Gómez Laborde (1948–2023), Uruguayan cartoonist, caricaturist and illustrator
- Valentine de Laborde (1806–1894), French socialite and salon holder, daughter of Alexandre de Laborde and granddaughter of Jean Joseph de Laborde, Marquis of Laborde
- Yurisel Laborde (born 1979), Cuban judoka
