= National Institute of Transparency for Access to Information and Personal Data Protection =

Mexican government agency, 2002–2025

- Instituto Nacional de Transparencia, Acceso a la Información y Protección de Datos Personales

- INAI's building in 2020
- Abbreviation: INAI; IFAI
- Successor: Transparency for the People
- Formation: 12 June 2002; 24 years ago
- Dissolved: 20 March 2025; 19 months ago
- Type: Autonomous organization
- Legal status: Institution
- Headquarters: Avenida de los Insurgentes Sur 3211
- Location: Mexico City
- Coordinates: 19°18′27″N 99°11′14″W
- Services: Government transparency, personal data protection
- Official language: None
- Formerly called: Federal Institute for Access to Government Information; Federal Institute of Transparency for Access to Information and Personal Data Protection

The National Institute for Transparency, Access to Information and Personal Data Protection (Spanish: Instituto Nacional de Transparencia, Acceso a la Información y Protección de Datos Personales, INAI) was Mexico's autonomous public institution responsible for guaranteeing the right of access to public information and the protection of personal data.

It was established in 2002 as the Federal Institute for Access to Government Information (Spanish: Instituto Federal de Acceso a la Información Pública Gubernamental, IFAI). Its creation was a result of a period of democratic transition in Mexico following 71 years of political dominance by the Institutional Revolutionary Party (PRI). During the presidency of Vicente Fox, it was enacted a law on access to information to provide government transparency and accountability, and establish mechanisms that allowed citizens to scrutinize federal government decisions, as well as the use of public resources.

During its tenure, the institute followed citizens' request for information from government authorities that had refused to disclose and the institute's responsibilities were expanded nationwide. The INAI also assessed whether the classification of information as confidential was justified, and verified whether government agencies were properly protecting personal data. The institute operated the National Transparency Platform, which allowed the access to digital requests, access of public information, and protect personal data. Throughout its existence, due to the disclosure of documents through transparency requests, the institute helped bring various cases and scandals involving government corruption to public attention, including the Estafa Maestra, Agronitrogenados, Casa Blanca, Casa Gris, Odebrecht, and Segalmex cases. On several occasions, government agencies attempted to prevent the publication of information through lawsuits.

The INAI was dissolved following the 2024 constitutional reforms promoted during the presidency of Andrés Manuel López Obrador, who argued corruption, inefficiency and cost overruns in the institute's operations. He had previously been sanctioned for disclosing a journalist's private information and had condemned the institute for involving his son in an alleged conflict-of-interest case. The INAI was replaced in 2025 by the government agency Transparency for the People (Spanish: Transparencia para el Pueblo), part of the Secretariat of Anticorruption and Good Governance, a federal institution criticized for making harder to request and comply with information requests.

== Background and establishment ==
During the 20th century, Mexico's political system was characterized by the concentration of power held by the Institutional Revolutionary Party (PRI) and limited access to government information. Although the constitution had recognized the right to information since 1977, for years there were no sufficiently developed procedures through which citizens could exercise it.

Following the 1988 elections, which were deemed fraudulent, the Federal Electoral Institute (IFE) was created and headed by citizens to mitigate public backlash. In 1994, Mexico joined the Organization for Economic Co-operation and Development (OECD) and co-signed the North American Free Trade Agreement (NAFTA) with Canada and the United States, which lead to media reviewing the government more openly. In 1996, Ernesto Zedillo promoted an electoral reform that granted the institute full autonomy, thereby ensuring free elections in the year 2000. Vicente Fox from the opposition National Action Party won the election, ending 71 years of uninterrupted PRI rule. It also led to the beginning of a democratic transition in the country.

Following Fox's victory, journalists, academics and representatives of civil society organizations advocated for national transparency legislation and formed the Oaxaca Group (Spanish: Grupo Oaxaca). Fox submitted a bill to the Chamber of Deputies, the Federal Law on Transparency and Access to Information, presented on 6 December 2001. The final version was approved on 24 April 2002 and published in the Official Journal of the Federation on 11 June 2002. The law provided for the creation of the Federal Institute for Access to Government Information (Spanish: Instituto Federal de Acceso a la Información Pública Gubernamental, IFAI) the next day.

== IFAI (2003–2014) ==
The institute's first logo

The IFAI began operations on 12 June 2003. Its primary responsibility was to ensure that federal government agencies and entities complied with the accountability and transparency legislation. The institute was allowed to resolve disputes between citizens and government authorities when the latter rejected information requests, sets rules telling government agencies when they may keep information confidential and when they must open it to the public, so that openness remains the norm, as well as ensuring that government agencies with access to citizens' data adequately protect it and are held accountable for doing so. In Haydeé Pérez's view, the institute's autonomy was essential to ensuring that governments could neither interfere with its functions nor exert pressure on it.

The IFAI's first governing board consisted of five commissioners. María Marván Laborde became the first institute's chairperson, helding the position until 2006. Horacio Aguilar Álvarez de Alba, Juan Pablo Guerrero Amparán, Alonso Gómez-Robledo Verduzco, and José Octavio López Presa were the first commissioners. The selection drew some criticism from academics for excluding members of the Oaxaca Group, the appointment of Aguilar as commissioner, who was a former advisor to Fox and Norberto Rivera Carrera, then cardinal of the Archdiocese of Mexico, as well as the nomination of Guillermo Velasco Arzac as commissioner, an alleged member of the El Yunque organization, a Mexican Catholic secret society. In May 2004, the institute moved into the Casa Pedro Domecq building, located at Avenida México 151, in Coyoacán, although it avoided publishing the purchase contract online.

The IFAI introduced the System for Information Requests (Sistema de Solicitudes de Información, SISI), an online platform that allowed people to submit requests without having to visit government offices. Between June 2003 and May 2005, the institute received 77,930 information requests, and nearly three-quarters of the applications rejected by government agencies were reversed by the institute in favor of the petitioners. The initial period of the organization's existence was marked by a growing adherence to the freedom of information statute, from 32 percent in 2003 to over 90 percent in 2005, according to the IFAI. In 2006, SISI was replaced with the Sistema Infomex platform, which made it possible to track transparency requests online. On 20 July 2007, a constitutional amendment was published that recognized access to public information as a human right rather than merely a government accountability tool and established minimum standards for its protection and enforcement across Mexico. On 5 July 2010, a law took effect, renaming the institute the Federal Institute for Access to Information and Data Protection (Spanish: Instituto Federal de Acceso a la Información y Protección de Datos, IFAI), and expanded its authority over personal data protection.

Examples of disclosed cases included the allocation of MX$30 million intended for HIV/AIDS prevention and treatment to the National Pro-Life Committee (Comité Nacional Provida) instead, money that was used to build ten anti-abortion centers. Similarly, the Mexican government had diverted MX$200 million originally allocated for HIV/AIDS prevention and treatment, redirecting the funds to underfunded clinics rather than specialized care facilities. Transparency requests revealed that the 2011 television series El Equipo cost the Secretariat of Public Security MX$118 million to produce. Between 2003 and 2012, 477 writ of amparo lawsuits were filed against the institute's resolutions, according to its 2012 report. The organizations frequently involved in challenges included the Mexican Petroleum Workers' Union, the Attorney General of Mexico office (PGR), and the Tax Administration Service (SAT). Only in 2013, the IFAI won 78 percent of its lawsuits. On 7 December 2012, the IFAI headquarters were established at Avenida de los Insurgentes Sur 3211, near Jardines del Pedregal de San Ángel, Mexico City, following the purchase of a building without a public bidding process.

== INAI (2014–2025) ==
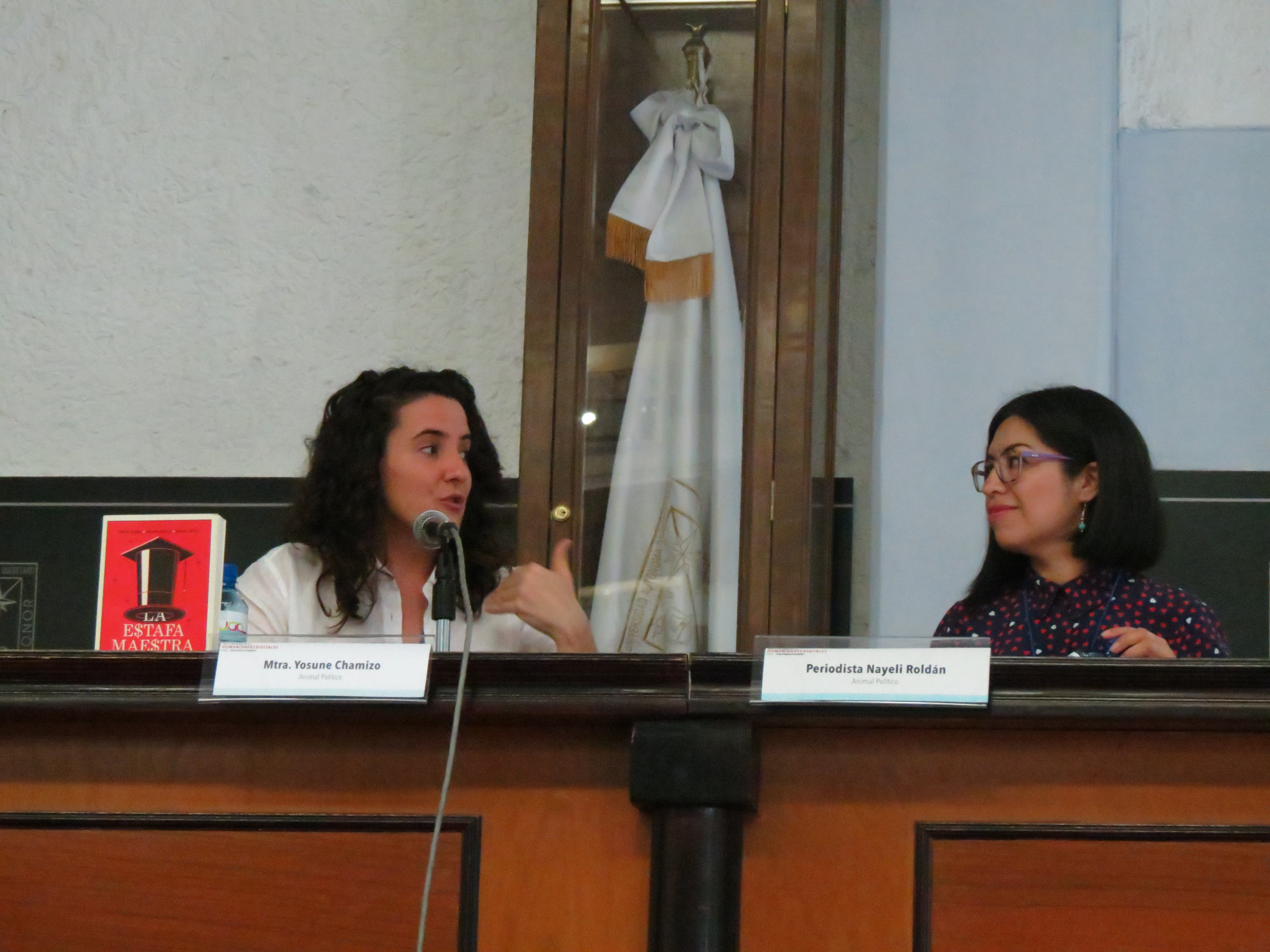
Journalists Yosume Chamizo (left) and Nayeli Roldán (right), from Animal Político, during a university assembly, discussing the Estafa Maestra scandal, which was discovered following 517 transparency requests.

One of the main limitations of the IFAI was the lack of constitutional autonomy, as it was an administrative body within the federal executive branch, and commissioners were appointed by the president of Mexico, subject to the Senate's power to object to the appointments. On 7 February 2014, a constitutional reform granted independence from the federal executive branch and expanded its jurisdiction to include entities receiving public funds, including the legislative and judicial branches (except for jurisdictional matters within the jurisdiction of the Supreme Court), political parties, autonomous constitutional bodies, and labor unions. The institute was renamed as the National Institute for Transparency, Access to Information and Personal Data Protection (Spanish: Instituto Nacional de Transparencia, Acceso a la Información y Protección de Datos Personales, INAI). The institution's framework was further developed through the General Law on Transparency and Access to Public Information, which came into force on 4 May 2015. The next year, the INAI established the National Transparency Platform (Spanish: Plataforma Nacional de Transparencia, PNT) as a successor of Sistema Infomex, which helped citizens to submit information requests, access public records and transparency disclosures, request the protection of their personal data, and challenge unsatisfactory government responses.

Among the most significant transparency cases brought to public attention through the INAI before 2018 were its order directing the PGR to release a public version of its investigation into the 2014 Iguala mass kidnapping; its request that the SAT disclose the names of individuals and companies that received tax waivers between 2007 and 2015; the Estafa Maestra ('master scam') investigation, which relied on 517 information requests, into the diversion of approximately MX$7.67 billion in funds to 128 companies not meant to receive them, involving 11 federal agencies; and the purchase of a mansion in the affluent Lomas de Chapultepec neighborhood by Angélica Rivera, then wife of Enrique Peña Nieto, president of Mexico from 2012 to 2018, a property built by Grupo Higa, one of Peña Nieto's frequent government contractors; the Agronitrogenados case, involving the state-owned oil company Pemex's purchase of an overpriced fertilizer plant from Altos Hornos de México, then headed by Alonso Ancira; as well as the request for the names of officials involved in the Odebrecht case.

In 2018, the presidency of Andrés Manuel López Obrador began. During his administration, it became known the government's use of the Pegasus spyware despite López Obrador had pledge to stop its use. Other major information requests concerned the requests on information related to the COVID-19 pandemic, public spending, and institutional responses to it, and following the emergence of the Segalmex scandal, the institute instructed the Secretariat of the Civil Service to release documents related to the diversion of MX$15 billion.

== Dissolution ==
Logo for Transparency for the People

In 2022, the Casa Gris case emerged when a joint investigation between Mexicans Against Corruption and Impunity and Latinus revealed that José Ramón López Beltrán, the eldest son of López Obrador, had lived in a luxury residence in Houston, Texas, rented from a former executive of Baker Hughes, a company with contracts with Pemex, creating an alleged conflict of interest.

Before its publication, López Obrador had repeatedly criticized the INAI, claiming that it was designed to protect corrupt politicians and that its senior officials earned salaries three times higher than his own, despite the constitutional prohibition on such pay. Following the publication of the report on Casa Gris, López Obrador demanded that the INAI release the personal information of Carlos Loret de Mola, a journalist for Latinus, including details of his salary, those of his family, and Loret de Mola's personal and professional background. The institute refused as Loret de Mola is not a civil servant, and López Obrador subsequently disclosed Loret de Mola's tax information during one of his presidential briefings, prompting the INAI to issue a sanction against López Obrador. However, the sanction was invalid because the institute lacked the authority to impose it. Two years later, López Obrador disclosed Loret de Mola's private information again, this time through the Financial Intelligence Unit.

In 2023, the INAI faced an institutional paralysis after the Senate, dominated by López Obrador's party, Morena, failed to appoint replacements for three outgoing commissioners, leaving the institute with only four of its seven members, below the quorum required to hold plenary sessions and issue decisions. In August 2023, the Supreme Court authorized the INAI to resume sessions with four commissioners. In 2024, López Obrador proposed a constitutional reform to eliminate the INAI and six other constitutionally autonomous organizations, which was approved for discussion by the Chamber of Deputies. His argument continued being that the INAI was not very cost-effective, describing its officials as "useless", and that the institution was created to cover up corruption.

The dissolution of the INAI was formally effected through the promulgation of newer transparency and personal data protection laws by decree on 20 March 2025, which established the creation of the agency Transparency for the People (Spanish: Transparencia para el Pueblo), part of the government's Secretariat of Anticorruption and Good Governance. According to Article 19, Transparency for the People had rejected 99.6 percent of transparency requests as of August 2025. Furthermore, as a federal agency within the executive branch, it has no authority over requests outside it. As of April 2026, only 18 states had established local transparency institutes. According to Marván Laborde, Transparency for the People received 60 percent fewer complaints than the INAI, partly because filing transparency requests with Transparency for the People was more difficult.
