= Malambo (dance) =

Folk dance of Argentina

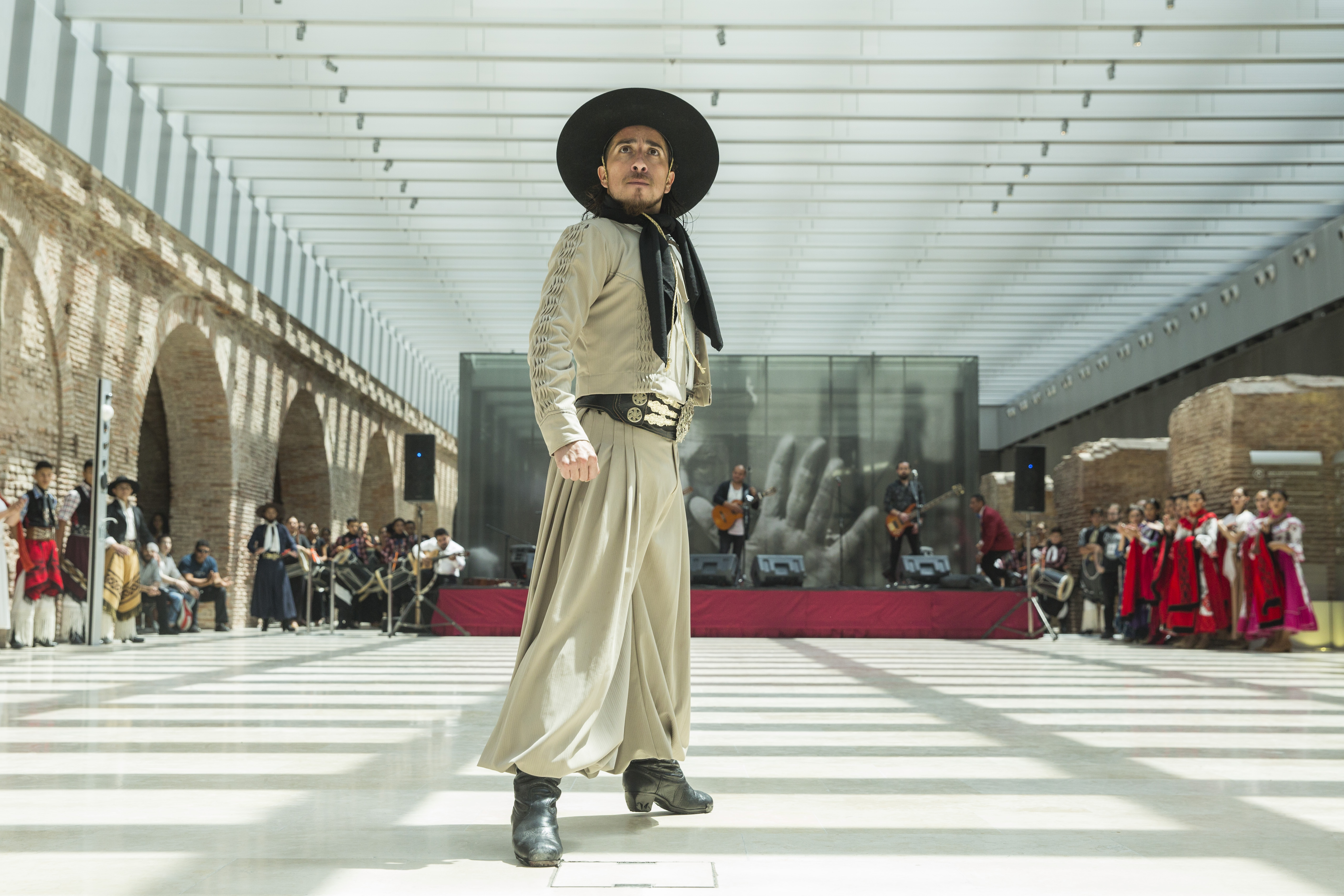
Malambo solo

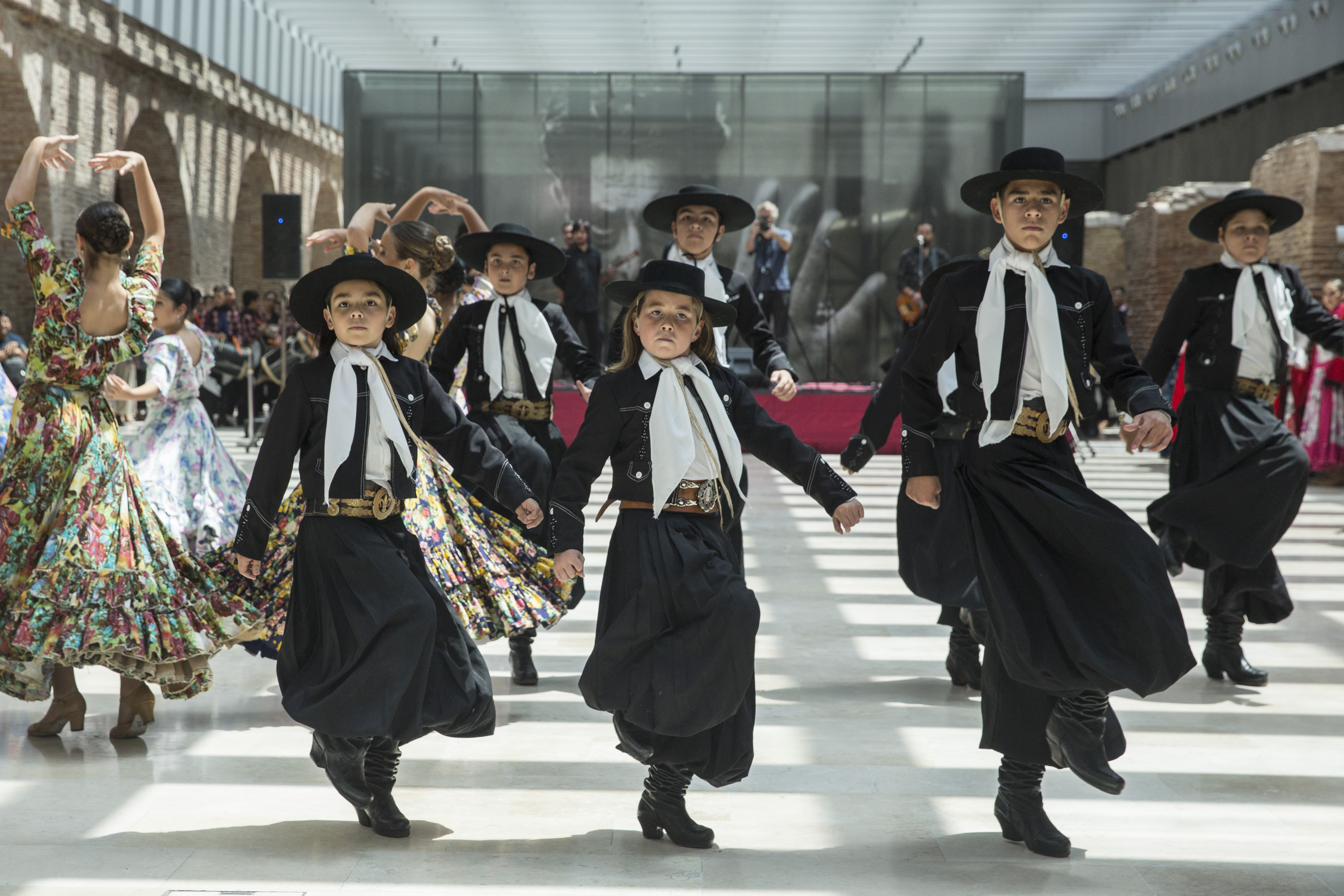
Dance performance involving a group malambo

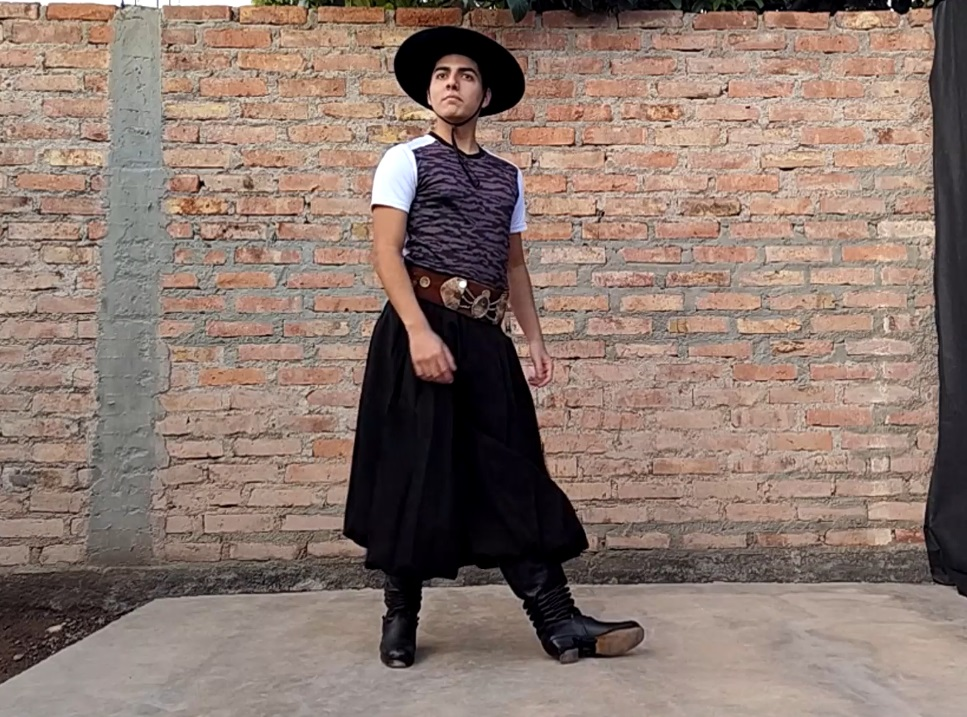
An unusual type of zapateado by the side of the boot, characteristic of malambo

Malambo is an Argentine folk dance associated with gauchos. It is traditionally a dance performed by two men, taking turns and competing against one another. Its notable elements are elaborate leg movements with energetic zapateados (stomping) and cepillados ("brushing"/"scrubbing").

Malambo has no formal choreography. In the Bulletin of the Pan American Union, Volume 67, C.J. Videla-Rivero described it as follows: "The malambo is exclusively a masculine dance. One gaucho taps, kicks, crosses his legs, pounds the earth with the side of his feet, make his spurs tinkle, and fills the air with a thousand and one different figures while his opponent, crouched, watches him."

While malambo originated as a competition between two gauchos, it may be performed in several ways: solo, in groups (synchronized or individual choreographies), counterpoint vis a vis, counterpoint quartets.

Malambo was popularized in Argentina at the beginning of the 19th century. The two main styles of malambo are the “estilo sureño” ("Southern style") and the “estilo norteño” ("Northern style"). The “estilo norteño” tends to have a faster rhythm than that of the South, and use a unique guitar strum.

The first musical version of malambo was published by Ventura Lynch in 1883.

The Festival Nacional del Malambo ("National Malambo Festival"), a major malambo performance and competition event, has been held annually in Laborde, Córdoba since 1966. Malambo also features prominently at the annual Cosquín Folk Festival, also in Cordoba.

Malevo, an Argentine dance troupe, made it to the semifinals of America's Got Talent in 2016. In June 2024, Argentinian malambo troupe Legión received the "Golden Buzzer" for their AGT audition. In 2018, the first Campeonato nacional de malambo femenino ("National Women's Malambo Championship") was organized in Carlos Paz, Cordoba.

== National Malambo Festival (Festival Nacional del Malambo) ==
The National Malambo Festival has been held in Laborde, a small town in the province of Córdoba, since its first edition in 1966. The festival is held annually in the second half of January and it lasts six nights. Its objective is to promote and revalue national culture with a focus on dance, music, and tradition. It also aims at strengthening social bonds between participants from different provinces and countries. In this festival, a competition is held and there are different categories in which participants can compete.

The festival was created by “Amigos del Arte” and was held for the first time in a local club in 1966. In 1974, the planning committee made up of neighbors, purchased the thousand square metered venue of the former Spanish Society and built a stage because of the event's rapid growth.

Since 1974, the festival has been held uninterrupted until the present, except for in 2021 when it was suspended because of the global pandemic.

Since 2004, the 23 Argentinian provinces have participated in the festival. During the week of the festival, different activities take place which are aimed at spreading knowledge on the traditions of each of the provinces. Among the activities, there are workshops, conferences, peñas, and craft fairs.

Besides the Malambo dance competition, which is the main event, every year the “Paisana Nacional del Malambo” is crowned. The contestants parade in their traditional outfits and must show their dancing abilities and be interviewed by the judges. The winner is given a band and performs a choreographed dance with the male champion.

== Current trends ==
Since its emergence in the seventeenth century, the dance and its traditions have evolved significantly. In the beginning, Malambo was originally performed by only two men, in a more subtle and elegant way. Nowadays, however, it can be performed as a group and also by women, and may include more aggressive moves and accessories, like boleadoras or even fire.

A Malambo group called “Malevo” became famous world-wide after their participation in “America's Got Talent” in 2016. They toured all around the globe, bringing this important part of Argentine folklore culture closer to the rest of the world. They even performed in Las Vegas for a sold-out Cirque du Soleil show, to raise funds for critical water issues. More recently, a group named “Legión” participated in the 2024 edition of “America's Got Talent”, performing the dance with their boots set on fire, amazing the judges and the public.

Even though women have presumably been dancing Malambo for a long time, their presence in this art has been strongly invisibilized until 2018, when the first National Female Malambo Championship (Campeonato Nacional de Malambo Femenino) was held in the city of Carlos Paz, Córdoba. The organizer, Ivana Carrazco, was once approached by a lady that said to have won a Malambo competition in 1950, which proves that women have been practicing this dance since last century, if not for longer. Carrazco and Jose Luis Baez, the president of the Championship, came up with the idea of holding the event to give women a place to compete in all the categories, since the National Festival in Laborde is only for men. Despite the separation usually made between female and male Malambo, many dancers deny there exists any technical difference in the performance of the discipline.

== Malambo in popular culture ==
Malambo dancing is the main subject in a number of books and films.

In Literature

The book “A Simple Story: The Last Malambo” (“Una historia sencilla”, 2013) by journalist and writer Leila Guerriero chronicles the experiences of a contestant in the National Malambo Festival during its 2012 edition.

In Film

The 2020 coming-of-age drama film Karnawal, written and directed by Juan Pablo Félix, tells the story of Cabra, a teenager who dreams of becoming a professional malambo dancer. The leading actor, Martín López Lacci, was discovered by the casting team while he performed in the National Malambo Festival in Laborde.

The 2018 drama film “Malambo: El hombre bueno”, directed by Santiago Loza, revolves around the relationship between a malambo dancer and his mentor, as the protagonist trains in order to return to the National Malambo Festival's competition after sustaining a back injury.

Documentaries

“Guerrero de norte y sur”, a 2019 documentary film directed by Mauricio Halek, depicts the day-to-day life of Facundo Arteaga, a solo malambo dancer, as he tries his luck at the national competition one last time. The film focuses on the solitary nature of the solo dancer “reinforcing the prototypical image of the gaucho from the Pampas Plain in its desolate immensity.”

The documentary film “Origen, el malambo y la mujer” (2021), directed by Sergio Magallanes, revolves around female malambo dancers and the National Women's Malambo Championship (Campeonato Nacional de Malambo Femenino), which takes place in Villa Carlos Paz, Córdoba since 2018. The film includes the testimonies of José Luis Báez and Ivana Carrasco, the creators of the competition.
