= Corruption in Mexico =

Corruption in Mexico has permeated several segments of society—political, economic, and social—and has greatly affected the country's legitimacy, transparency, accountability, and effectiveness. Many of these dimensions have evolved as a product of Mexico's legacy of elite, oligarchic consolidation of power and authoritarian rule.

In Transparency International's 2025 Corruption Perceptions Index, Mexico was scored 27 out of 100, where 0 is "highly corrupt" and 100 is "very clean". This is an eight-point loss compared to Mexico's highest score in 2014, and a insignificant increase compared to 2024, when Mexico scored its lowest ever at 26. When ranked by score, Mexico ranked 141th among the 182 countries in the 2025 Index, where the country ranked first is perceived to have the most honest public sector. For comparison with regional scores, the best score among the countries of the Americas (Note: Argentina, Bahamas, Barbados, Belize, Bolivia, Brazil, Canada, Chile, Colombia, Costa Rica, Cuba, Dominica, Dominican Republic, Ecuador, El Salvador, Grenada, Guatemala, Guyana, Haiti, Honduras, Jamaica, Mexico, Nicaragua, Panama, Paraguay, Peru, Saint Lucia, Saint Vincent and the Grenadines, Suriname, Trinidad and Tobago, United States of America, Uruguay, Venezuela) was 75 (Canada), the average score was 42 and the lowest score was 10 (Venezuela). For comparison with worldwide scores, the best score was 89 (Denmark, ranked 1), the average score was 42, and the worst score was 9 (Somalia and South Sudan, both ranked 181 in a tie).

== History ==
Corruption in Mexico traces back to colonial times. With the arrival of Spanish conquistadors to Mexico, the Spanish crown granted positions of power to certain wealthy and influential individuals. These offices were often short-lived because officials were charged with collecting revenue, maintaining order and sustaining their regions while only relying on local sources of wealth and sustenance. People began to attempt to influence their local political leaders and would hold fiestas to gain favour with them. This system of bribery and purchasing one's way into power and influence continued into post-colonial times, where Mexican society adopted a class system and organised itself into a pyramid-like hierarchy, with the rich and powerful at the top. After independence, corruption was used not only as a means of advancement, but also as a means to provide goods and services. Over time, the practice of using unofficial means became a way for bureaucrats to generate revenue for infrastructural and social projects as well as to supplement their incomes.

=== PRI rule ===
PRI party

Although the Institutional Revolutionary Party (PRI) came to power through cooptation and peace, it maintained power for 71 years straight (1929 to 2000) by establishing patronage networks and relying on personalistic measures, resulting in Mexico functioning as a one-party state and characterized by a system in which politicians provided bribes to their constituents in exchange for support and votes for reelection. This type of clientelism constructed a platform through which political corruption had the opportunity to flourish: little political competition and organization outside of the party existed; it was not possible to independently contest the PRI system. Political contestation equated to political, economic, and social isolation and neglect. The party remained securely in power, and government accountability was low.

Hierarchization was the norm. Power was consolidated in the hands of an elite few, and even more narrowly, the president controlled almost all of the practical power across the three branches of government. This central figure had both the formal and informal power to exercise extralegal authority over the judiciary and legislature and to relegate these other branches to the executive's political will.

Beyond this, few checks were set on elected officials’ actions throughout the PRI's unbroken reign. Consequently, sustained PRI rule yielded low levels of transparency and legitimacy within the councils of Mexico's government. 71 years of power provided an opportunity for corruption to accumulate and become increasingly complex. Civil society developed around economic interest aggregation that was organized by the clientelistic government; the PRI allowed citizens to collectively bargain under the condition that they would continue to provide political loyalty to the party. Anthony Kruszewski, Tony Payan, and Kathleen Staudt explain,

"Running through the formal structure of…political institutions was a well-articulated and complex set of…networks…[that] deliberately manipulate[d] governmental resources…to advance their political aspirations and to protect their private interests and those of their clienteles and partners… Under the political geometry of an authoritarian and centralized scheme [corruption]…grew and prospered."

With this type of institutionalized corruption, the political path in Mexico was very narrow. There were specified political participation channels (the party) and selective electoral mobilization (party members). These issues, deeply engrained in Mexico's political culture after over half a century's existence, have continued to generate and institutionalize political corruption in today's Mexico.

== Vote buying ==
Due to weak law enforcement and weak political institutions, vote-buying and electoral fraud are phenomena that typically do not see any consequences. As a result of a pervasive, tainted electoral culture, vote buying is common among major political parties that they sometimes reference the phenomenon in their slogans, "Toma lo que los demás dan, ¡pero vota Partido Acción Nacional!" (transl. Take what the others give, but vote National Action Party!)

== Organized crime ==
=== Border issues ===
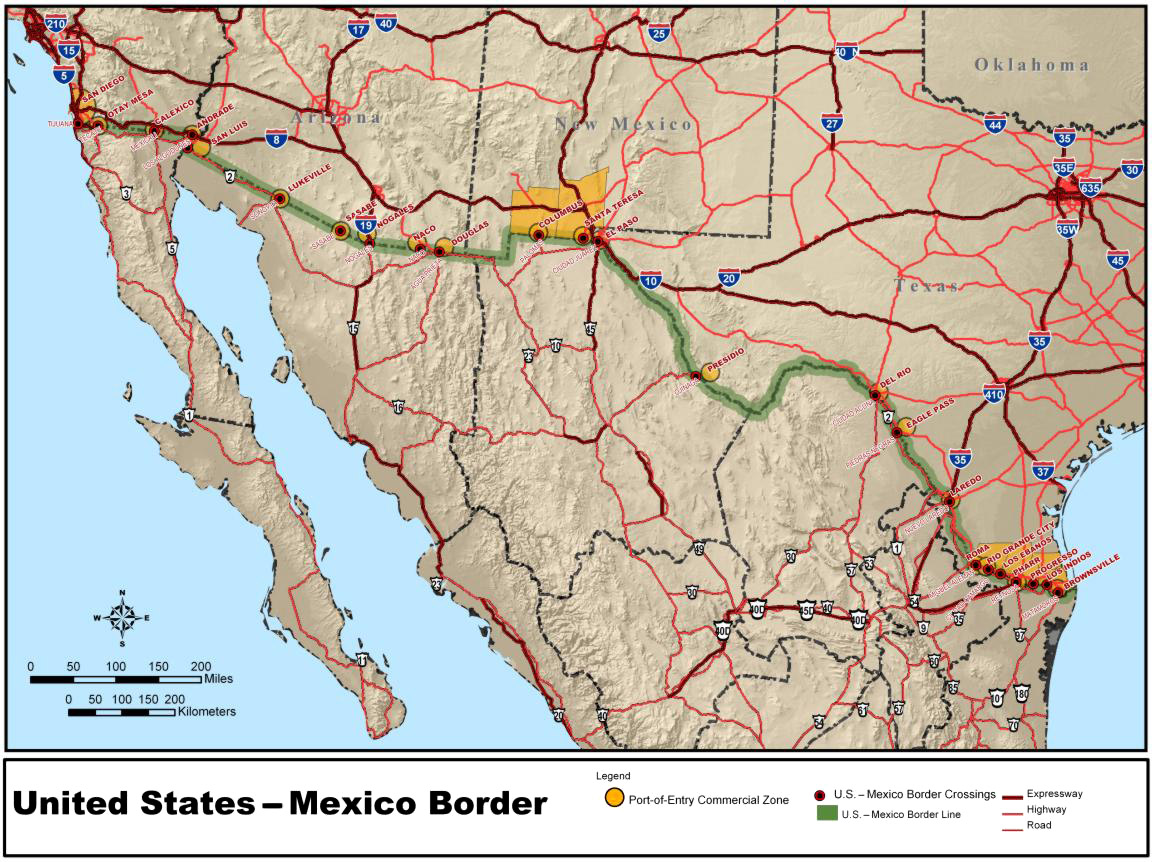
US-Mexico border

Mexico’s geographic location has played largely in the development of the country’s role in organized crime and drug trafficking. Not only is Mexico adjacent to the world’s largest illegal drug market – the United States – but it also borders Central and South America, the latter being a region of nations with a similarly high demand for drugs. This positions Mexican drug cartels at an advantage; demand for drugs is not simply confined to the Mexican state, but rather it extends to several other nearby countries. Because of this, Mexico’s borders are especially crucial to drug cartels and transnational criminal organizations (TCOs), which can exploit the borders as a passageway for contraband and as a method for consolidation of power.

As drug cartels and TCOs have increasingly made use of these areas, the groups have become progressively more complex, violent, and diverse. Trafficking has been accompanied by other forms of illegal activity – such as extortion, kidnappings, and political corruption – as disparate factions compete for control over the same, lucrative areas.

The Mexican government has historically accomplished very little in terms of effectively curbing the offenses of these TCOs and cartels and has often actually been complicit in aiding their actions. Many of Mexico’s institutions – including those for law, policy, justice, and finance – function under a patron-client system in which officials receive money, political support, or other bribes from TCOs in exchange for minimal interference in, or impunity for, those criminal groups’ affairs. In these scenarios of narco-corruption, Mexico's power structure is defined by leaders who guide TCOs’ behaviors, receive payoffs, manipulate government resources, and align public policies with legislation that will further their personal and political objectives. These relationships have served as an impetus for new and problematic sources of violent, drug-related deaths, ineffective governance and policy implementation, terror-based TCO tactics, and a deepening drug market. Under this system, TCOs’ influence has extended beyond violent criminal activity or drug trade and has reached into Mexico's institutional bases.

These networks – alongside a lack of government transparency and checks and balances – have allowed corruption in government to flourish.

=== Transition to PAN rule ===
PAN party

The growing prevalence and diversification of organized crime are in many ways linked to the political changes that Mexico underwent in 2000. For the first time in 71 years, the PRI ceded power to a different party, the National Action Party (Mexico) (PAN). The traditional power structure, which had enabled patronage networks to flourish and TCOs to operate, became challenged by government forces that attempted to curb violence and illegal activity.

However, social decomposition quickly followed the fall of the PRI. The PAN, never before in the seat of power, was in many ways inexperienced in broad governance, and criminal factions capitalized on the party's perceived weakness. New conflicts emerged among cartels, as different groups competed to further develop their criminal networks and to work against a political regime that struggled to fight corruption, establish legitimacy, and foster legislative effectiveness.

=== Calderón administration ===
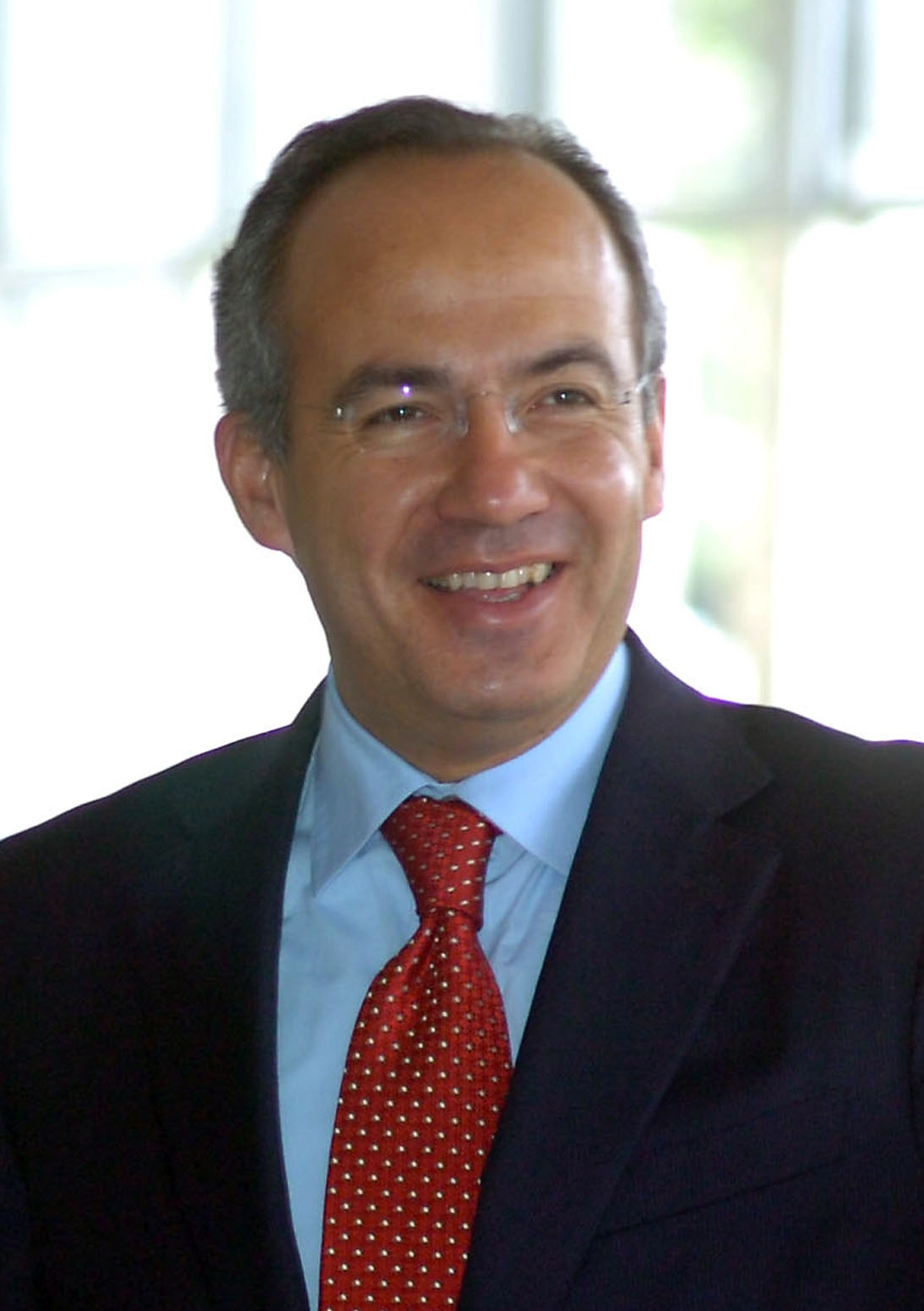
President Felipe Calderón (2006–2012)

During PAN President Felipe Calderón's administration, Mexico experienced a vast increase in organized crime. Anthony Kruszewski, Tony Payan, and Kathleen Staudt note,

“The wave of violence [in] Mexico…[under] President Calderón…revolve[d] largely around the issue of illegal drugs, and spun off a nationwide public safety crisis and exposed the inadequacies of the Mexican administration of justice system…[It] also uncovered the deep corruption of the Mexican political forces.”

In this, beyond further diversifying criminal activity, TCOs further developed their connections to Mexico's institutions and corruption. Many members of the Federal Police and the Army joined TCOs and participated in abuses against the citizenry. This corruption permeated the social atmosphere along the border, where violence became increasingly heightened and fatal. Attempting to combat this security crisis, Calderón deployed the military against criminal organizations along the border. However, rather than resolving the corruption and violence issues that pervaded the area, the army deepened problems and crime. Citizens claimed that armed soldiers, connected to TCOs through their patronage networks, initiated abuses against the population, including illegal searches, unwarranted arrests, beatings, theft, rape, and torture.

The employment of the military by the Calderón administration exacerbated Mexico's violence and organized crime, adding human rights violations to the border's climate of lawlessness. Anthony Kruszewski, Tony Payan, and Kathleen Staudt examine,

“The Calderón administration[‘s]…use of armed forces…exposed the weaknesses [and corruption] of state and municipal authorities who had virtually abandoned certain territories to criminal groups. Surrendering public spaces to organized crime had already become a serious threat to national security and had overtaken the capabilities of local governments to do anything about it.”

The arrival of the military corresponded with institutional disintegration as the corruption of elected officials, soldiers, and police demonstrated the entrenched culture of dishonesty and illegality of Mexico's systems.

To mitigate the negative consequences of militia employment, Calderón changed his policy strategy to one of reconstruction – rebuilding the Federal Police to have an increase in technical and operational activities, to have more comprehensive offices and departments, and to have a more selective personnel recruitment process. These measures reduced some of the corruption that had been embedded under his administration, but still left many realms of Mexico in the clutches of institutional corruption.

=== Peña Nieto administration ===
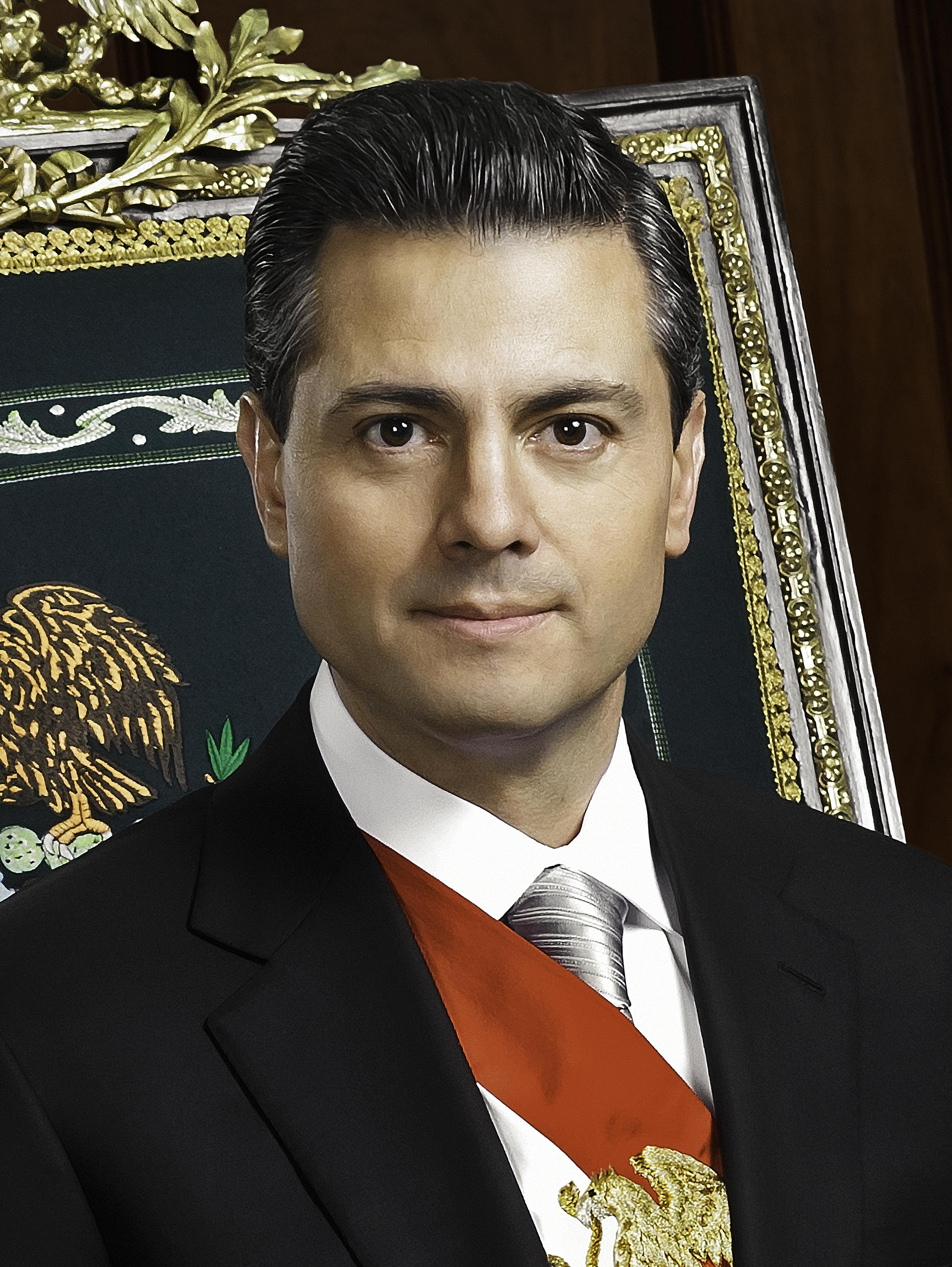
President Enrique Peña Nieto (2012–2018)

Following Calderón's administration, the PRI returned to power under President Enrique Peña Nieto. Although new hopes for a more safe and secure Mexico accompanied the change in office, residual problems from the previous administrations continued to pervade the country. TCO violence remained high, local clientelism persisted, and the drug market continued to be profitable. With these issues still highly prominent and supported by corruption, the administration struggled to establish legitimacy and accountability within the councils of governance.

These issues of legitimacy became even more defined in 2014 when Peña Nieto became entangled in numerous corruption scandals. In the most prominent and controversial case, Peña Nieto, his wife Angélica Rivera, and his Finance Minister Luis Videgaray were criticized for purchasing multimillion-dollar houses from government contractors. Allegations of vast impropriety surrounded the deal, and citizens began to question the veracity and legitimacy of Peña Nieto's government. Moreover, when an investigation into these allegations was launched, Public Function Ministry head Virgilio Andrade – a close personal friend of President Peña Nieto – was put in charge, and many Mexicans cited the investigation as a conflict of interest in which "the executive branch investigated itself."

This scandal brought about another controversy when investigative journalist Carmen Aristegui and two colleagues from MVS Radio were fired following their reports on the housing scandal. Their dismissal prompted protests and criticism, alongside a new dialogue of the Peña Nieto administration's use of “soft censorship”:

"“The government [has] routinely used financial incentives and doled out penalties to punish unflattering reporting and reward favorable stories. While Mexican journalists are frequently targets of physical attack, soft censorship is another more subtle and very significant danger to press freedom”

Also, in 2014, but later revealed in the 2018 Estafa Maestra ('master scam') investigation, during his administration there was a diversion of approximately MX$7.67 billion in funds to 128 companies not meant to receive them, involving 11 federal agencies.

As of August 2016, only 23% of Mexicans approved of how Peña Nieto was dealing with corruption. By January 2017, the number had decreased to 12%.

=== AMLO's administration ===
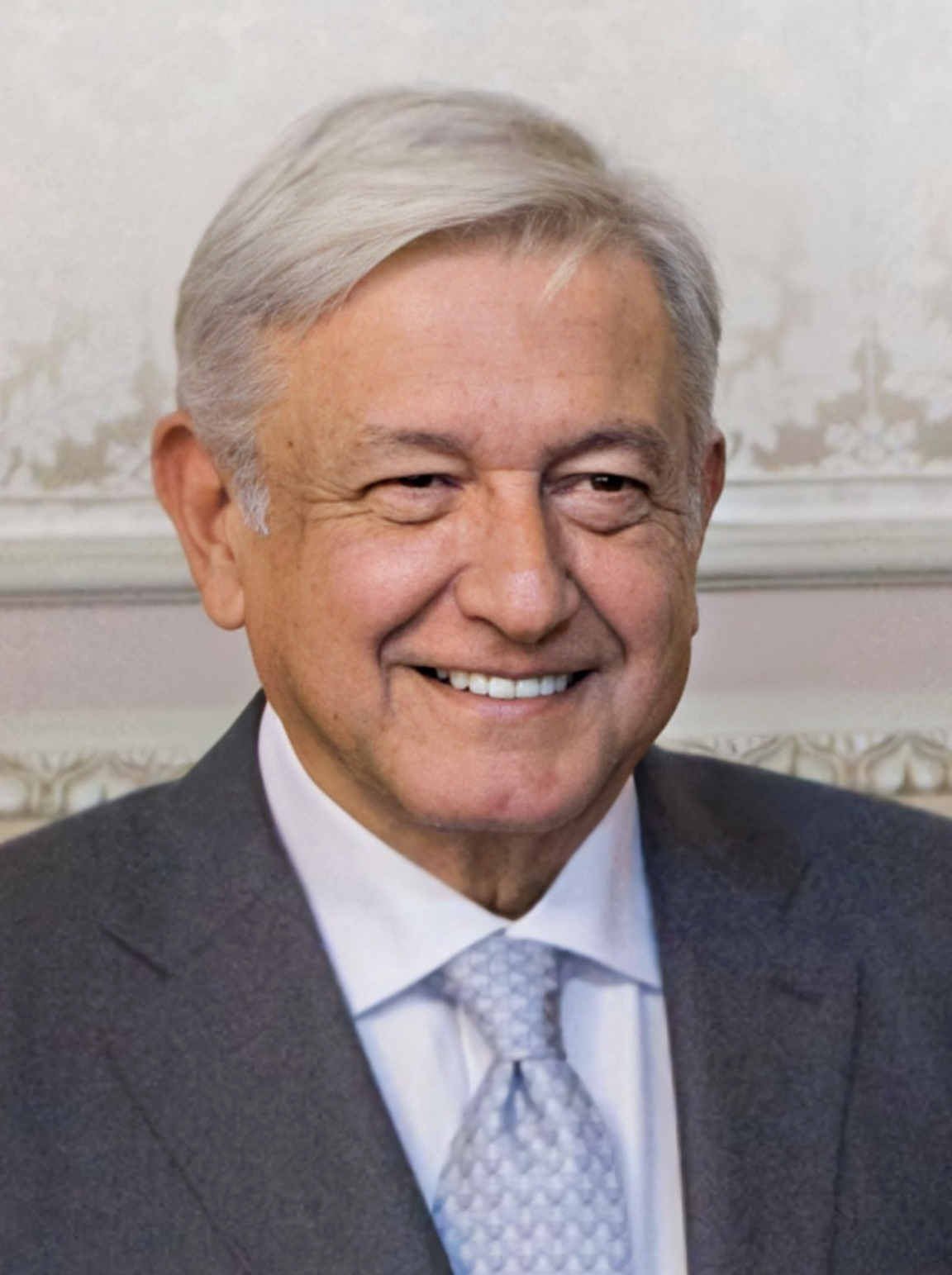
President Andrés Manuel López Obrador (2018–2024)

Following Enrique Peña Nieto’s administration, Mexico underwent a political shift with the election of Andrés Manuel López Obrador (commonly known as AMLO), a leftist leader from the MORENA party, who took office in December 2018. López Obrador promised to lead a government of austerity, fight corruption, and prioritize the needs of the poor and marginalized. His administration launched ambitious social programs and infrastructure projects, accompanied by his personal style of governance referred to as the "Cuarta Transformación" (lit. 'Fourth Transformation'), signifying a profound political and social reform for Mexico.

Despite these promises, AMLO's presidency was marred by controversies, including his administration's handling of corruption cases. One of the most prominent scandals was the Segalmex corruption case. Segalmex (Seguridad Alimentaria Mexicana, lit. 'Mexican Food Security'), an agency created under López Obrador to improve food security for rural and low-income communities, became the center of allegations involving the mismanagement and embezzlement of billions of pesos. Critics pointed to a lack of oversight and accountability within the program, undermining López Obrador’s anti-corruption rhetoric.

Another corruption case that stood in contrast to his rhetoric was the Huachicol fiscal scheme, which emerged during his term in office but was revealed afterward. 'Huachicol fiscal' describes a tax and customs fraud scheme involving imported fuels with false documentation. It is a practice carried out by cartels, corrupt high-ranking marine and customs officials, and corrupt companies involved in importing and distributing the fuel. Although AMLO publicly claimed to have successfully ended the practice, investigations by civil society groups paint a different picture.

The largest Huachicol Fiscal corruption network yet discovered was dismantled in 2025 during President Sheinbaum's term following the seizure of the tanker Challenge Procyon, revealing significant involvement of Marines and other officials in the port and customs infrastructure that facilitated and profited from the scheme. It was AMLO who transferred port oversight to the Marines during his term in office, and the arrested officials were put in charge during this period.

Before and during his presidential administration, Andrés Manuel López Obrador has been linked to organizations such as the Sinaloa's Cartel and La Barredora. Furthermore, the Covid-19 pandemic in Mexico exposed errors, improvisations, and negligence on the part of President Andrés Manuel López Obrador. The result: 297,000 people died, including nearly 5,000 healthcare workers, due to the government's decisions.

Since 2025, Andrés Manuel López Obrador and his MORENA party have controlled the Mexican judiciary by winning the judicial elections that same year, a process widely criticized by international organizations such as Human Rights Watch and Amnesty International, as it undermined the independence of the judiciary.

The Global Organized Crime Index cites corruption scandals linked to high-profile figures, including the son of President Andrés Manuel López Obrador, Mr. Andrés Manuel López Beltrán, which have raised concerns about corporate and government collusion.

Critics have suggested that the Maya Train and Tren Interoceánico megaprojects may not have had enough engineering, procurement and commission time for adequate operation. Experts also worry that the accelerated construction could be hiding structural problems. So far, the Tren Maya project has been linked to more than 60 workplace deaths, multiple route changes, and allegations of purchasing faulty ballast from corrupt networks. One of the main outcomes was the 2025 Oaxaca train derailment

Moreover, Andrés Manuel López Beltrán and Gonzalo Lopez Beltran are alleged to have been implicated in a network of contractors that has been accused of overpricing faulty materials for the construction of the Tren-Maya- project. Journalist Carlos Loret de Mola, writing in the newspaper El Universal, says that verified audios of Amilcar Olan, a friend of all three of AMLO's sons, portray Gonzalo as having played a critical role in directing the contracts to the network. De Mola also asserts that the allegations from the audio tapes have been largely confirmed by various documents obtained through freedom of information requests.

Enforced disappearances in Mexico reached critical levels under President Andrés Manuel López Obrador, with more than 125,000 people officially registered as missing, largely due to militarization and ongoing organized crime violence. While President López Obrador promised to resolve cases like the 2014 Ayotzinapa´s 43 disappearances in Iguala, his administration faced criticism for military involvement and attempts to reduce official disappearance figures.

Additionally, López Obrador's administration faced significant criticism for its approach to governance, which some saw as overly centralized and reliant on AMLO's personal authority. AMLO granted the military branches increasing power and authority, securitizing civilian institutions and transferring oversight to the military. Opponents claimed that the military was becoming too closely tied to AMLO and gained too much power, acting with impunity. According to AMLO, the military would be less corruptible. However, this is being questioned in light of investigation's findings. His frequent use of morning press conferences (*mañaneras*) to address the nation sometimes fueled polarization, as he often criticized the media and opposition. Despite these controversies, AMLO retained significant popular support throughout much of his presidency, buoyed by his direct communication style and his focus on social issues.

The Segalmex scandal, however, highlighted persistent structural problems in Mexican governance, raising questions about the effectiveness of López Obrador’s promised transformation and the durability of systemic corruption within the country.

=== Media ===
Compared to other Latin American countries, Mexico has one of the lowest rating for freedom of the press – press freedom watch groups have found that the country is one of the most dangerous in the world to be a professional journalist. The international human rights group Article 19 found that in 2014 alone, more than 325 journalists experienced aggressive action by government officials and organized crime, and five reporters were killed due to their line of work. According to RSF (Reporters Without Borders), the number is much higher. They report the murder of over 150 journalists and the disappearance of 28 others since 2000. This puts the country in 124th place out of 180 on the RSF World Press Freedom Index 2025.

Transnational criminal organisations (TCOs), such as Mexican cartels, are among the threats to journalists and the media. Many TCOs violently attacked media sources that reported stories of the gangs’, cartels’, and military's abuses and relationships with political elites. Consequently, many news organizations simply stopped publishing stories about the crimes. Freedom of expression and speech were increasingly limited as the media experienced violent disputes. Outside of TCOs, state apparatuses also worked to keep negative stories under wraps, making investigative journalism about government bodies dangerous. Guadalupe Correa-Cabrera and José Nava explain:

"Violence affecting Mexico’s border cities…has silenced the media, in a clear demonstration of the power that criminal enterprises exert over border society in drug war times…Aiding the enforcement of…silencing is the…complicity of the state itself…Due to the corruptive and coercive nature of organized crime – coupled with the weak and…corruptible state security and political institutions…, media organizations are left with no room for bias-free decision-making processes regarding the reporting of any news/notes about organized crime."

==== Pegasus-Scandal ====
Following a New York Times article from June 2017, some civil society organizations called for investigations into Mexican government practices after cyber attacks against journalists and human rights activists, using the Israeli espionage software 'Pegasus'. According to the groups, the Peña Nieto government signed Pegasus software license contracts during the transition period between the presidential elections and AMLO taking office in October. The Ministry of the Interior signed the contracts with shell companies such as Air Cap S.A. de C.V., led by the Israeli citizen Uri Ansbacher. A joint investigation in 2021 showed that at least 18 shell companies had been used to purchase the malware for local authorities up to the federal government, one of which was Air Cap.

In 2023, after a request for public information from a team of journalists, SEDENA (the Mexican Ministry of Defence) admitted to the existence of the requested documents but declared them classified for the next five years due to 'national security'. AMLO stated that documents 'relating to intelligence, not espionage' would not be made public in order to protect information belonging to the Defence and Marine secretariats.

In 2023, tests conducted by the civil society organization 'Centro Prodh' showed that two cyberattacks using Pegasus had been carried out against their members during AMLO's term, suggesting that the practice of espionage against civil society, journalists and critics had continued during his term. In 2025, the Israeli news outlet The Marker reported details surrounding Uri Ansbacher, the owner of Air Cap, who allegedly paid the Nieto government 25 million dollars in return for contracts to supply Pegasus malware.

== Police corruption ==
Corruption in the Mexican police can range from accepting bribes, to overlooking criminal activity, to actively participating in it through extortion, drug trafficking, and assassination.

Over 93% of crimes go unreported or are not investigated in Mexico. The 2011 Survey on Public Safety and Governance in Mexico reported that the extortion rate from criminal organizations is 10%, while 11% of these organizations report being extorted by the police. A 2015 Stanford paper described this as being consistent with the daily life of many Mexicans. Only 18% of Mexicans expressed a high level of trust in public security institutions in 2017, and only 7% in the case of municipal police. Additionally, only 13% are aware of any action taken to tackle corruption. Many people have confessed to bribing the police for even minor incidents such as illegal parking or various traffic violations. Police corruption has been linked to the continued spread of illicit narcotics and the growth of the drug manufacturing and distribution industries.

== Efforts to prevent corruption ==
Under the administration of former president Andrés Manuel López Obrador between 2019-2024, efforts were made to impose justice on abuse of power by government officials and other authorities. According to a recent study by Forbes Mexico, the federal government has taken steps to stop and diminish corruption, such as arresting corrupt individuals power and investigating corruption cases.

== See also ==
- Crime in Mexico
- The Demons of Eden
- Organized crime
- Police corruption in Mexico
- International Anti-Corruption Academy
- Group of States Against Corruption
- International Anti-Corruption Day
- ISO 37001 Anti-bribery management systems
- United Nations Convention against Corruption
- OECD Anti-Bribery Convention
- Transparency International
