= Françoise Laborde (journalist) =

French journalist

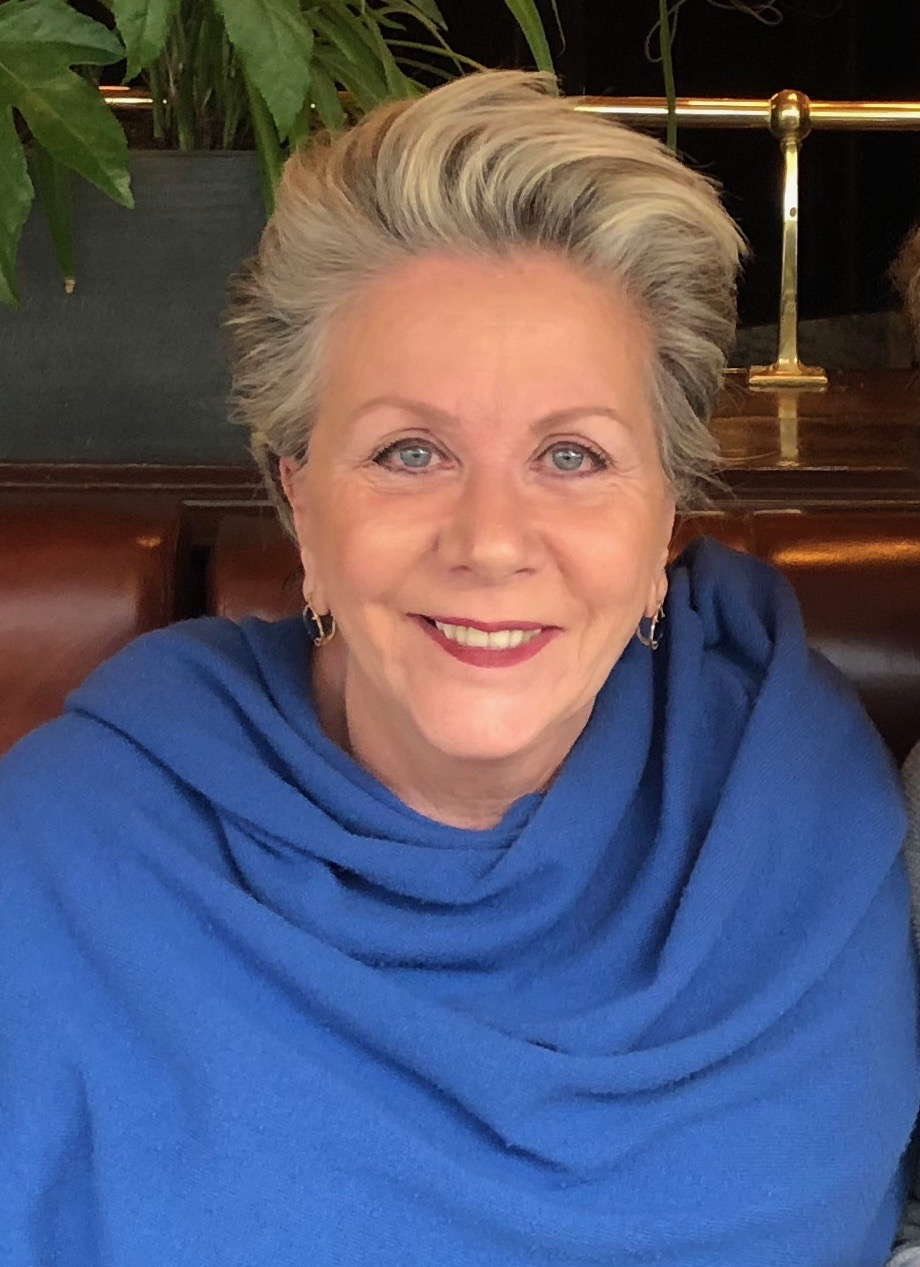
- Born: 1 May 1953 (age 73); Bordeaux, France
- Education: University of Bordeaux
- Occupation: Journalist • television presenter • writer
- Years active: 1979–2009
- Employer: France 2
- Organisation: Member of the CSA (2009-2015)
- Known for: Journal de 13 heures
- Relatives: Catherine Laborde (sister)

Françoise Laborde (born 1 May 1953) is a French journalist, writer and television presenter.

Between January 2009 and January 2015, she was a member of the French TV and Radio Regulatory Council (CSA).

== Early life and education ==
Her father, an English teacher and school inspector, was a teacher in the United States where he published a book on French civilization. Her mother, a Spanish woman, was a member of a Franco-British resistance network in World War II and decorated as such by the Queen of the United Kingdom. She has two older sisters, Geneviève and Catherine Laborde, a weather presenter and writer. The three sisters spent several summers in the United States with their parents between 1960 and 1967 and were partly educated in American schools.

After studying literature at the Lycée Camille-Jullian in Bordeaux, Françoise Laborde attended law school at the University of Bordeaux 1, where she obtained a DEA in business and law.

== Career ==
In 1979, she went to Brussels and contributed to the magazine Europolitics. At the same time, she was a correspondent for Radio France Internationale.

From 1982 to 1985, she specialized in economic and social affairs at RMC.

From 1985 to 1993, she was head of the economics department and deputy editor of TF1.

From 1993 to 1995, she was head of the economics department and deputy editor at France 3.

In 1995, she was appointed head of the economic and social departments and deputy editor at France 2.

In 1997, she became editor of Télématin and has since then presented the political interview show Les 4 vérités.

At the end of 1999, she became the substitute presenter for Béatrice Schönberg for the weekend news show on France 2. It was expected that beginning in March 2007 she would be acting presenter of the weekend news show for a few months, as Schönberg was temporarily dismissed from her post during the election campaign because of her marriage to Jean-Louis Borloo, a government minister. But in September 2006 Élise Lucet, presenter of the France 2 news programme Journal de 13 heures, announced her pregnancy; thus Laborde instead replaced Lucet, while Laurent Delahousse, who had recently come over from channel M6, became the substitute presenter for Schönberg.

On 24 January 2009, Nicolas Sarkozy, then President of the Republic, appointed her to the TV and Radio Regulatory Council.

On 3 February 2015, the Prime Minister appointed her to the High Council for Equality between Women and Men.

== Honors and commitments ==
Françoise Laborde is a Knight of the Order of the Legion of Honour, and is in the National Order of Merit. She is also an Officer of the Order of Agricultural Merit.

She is founder and president of PFDM, (Pour les femmes dans les médias – For women in the media), an association for women leaders in the media, and president of the Club des Amis du Refuge, an association for people active in Le Refuge in giving shelter to young people driven from their homes because of their homosexuality.

== Plagiarism accusation ==
In February 2012, Laborde and Denise Bombardier were accused by the website Acrimed of plagiarism in connection with their 2011 book Ne vous taisez plus!. The two authors deny this.

On 7 June 2013, the High Court of Paris found Éditions Fayard, publisher of the book, guilty of plagiarism, stating that it was "manifest that the text in question reproduces, very often word for word, the plaintiff's work".

== Books ==
- with Jean-Luc Mano (1990). Les Mammouths et les jeunes lions. À la recherche de la deuxième droite. Éditions Belfond. ISBN 978-2714424143.
- with Catherine Laborde (1997). Des sœurs, des mères, des enfants. Éditions Jean-Claude Lattès.
- Dix jours en mars à Bruxelles. Éditions Ramsay. 2000. ISBN 978-2841147861.
- with Stéphane Bugat (2002). L'Homme du 18 juin 2002. Éditions Ramsay. ISBN 978-2841146086.
- Pourquoi ma mère me rend folle. Éditions Ramsay. 2002. ISBN 978-2841146000.
- Ma mère n'est pas un philodendron. Éditions Fayard. 2003. ISBN 978-2213617558.
- Pas de panique Maman est là!. Éditions Fayard. 2005. ISBN 978-2213622033.
- C'est encore mieux à cinquante ans. Éditions Fayard. 2007. ISBN 978-2213628899.
- Tribulations d'une femme d'aujourd'hui: ça va mieux en le disant!. Éditions Fayard. 2008. ISBN 978-2213635804.
- with Denise Bombardier (2011). Ne vous taisez plus!. Éditions Fayard. ISBN 9782213666525.
- Muette. Quand ma mère me rendait folle. Éditions Jean-Claude Gawsewitch. 2013. ISBN 978-2-35013-404-8.
- with Isabelle Duquesnoy (2015). Les mûres ne comptent pas pour des prunes. Editions Michel Lafon.

She also wrote a foreword:

- Caroline Hommet, Karl Mondon and Dominique Beauchamp (2011). La Maladie d'Alzheimer: 100 questions/réponses. Éditions Ellipses. ISBN 978-2729865634.

== Private life ==
Laborde is married to Jean-Claude Paris, the former head of Canal+ Belgium and i>Télé. She has two sons from a previous relationship with Manuel Joaquim, TF1 reporter, winner of the Albert Londres prize, who died in 2006.
