= Europolis =

Europolis may refer to:

- Irisbus Europolis, a midibus model
- Europolis, a 1933 book by Romanian writer Eugeniu Botez
- A level in the 2016 video game Dreamfall Chapters

== See also ==
- Europolitics, a European affairs daily newspaper and website
