= Animal Político =

Mexican news portal

Logo for Animal Político

Animal Político is a Mexican news portal owned by Grupo Animal, which also operates El Sabueso. The portal publishes independent investigative reports on corruption, violence, and human rights issues in Mexico, and has become one of the most important investigative digital websites in Mexico.

Animal Político first opened a Twitter account, @pajaropolitico, in October 2009, and was later established as Animal Político in November 2010. The website has revealed various corruption cases and scandals. In 2016, Arturo Ángel Mendieta and Víctor Hugo Arteaga exposed of a network of shell companies in Veracruz, investigation that received a Walter Reuter Award and a National Journalism Award. In 2018, Animal Político and Mexicans Against Corruption and Impunity revealed the Estafa Maestra scam, in which approximately MX$7.67 billion in federal funds were diverted to 128 companies not meant to receive them, involving 11 federal agencies, investigation that earned an Ortega y Gasset Award and another National Journalism Award.
