= Le Refuge =

French charitable organization

- Founded: 2003
- Location: Montpellier, France
- Key people: Nicolas Noguier, Frédéric Gal
- Website: le-refuge.org

Le Refuge (trans. The Shelter) is a French association founded in 2003 and whose purpose is to provide temporary shelter and support young adults victims of homophobia and transphobia, especially within their own familial cell. It was founded by Nicolas Noguier in 2003. The first residents of the program were housed temporarily in a local hotel before the first structure dedicated full-time to the organization was built.

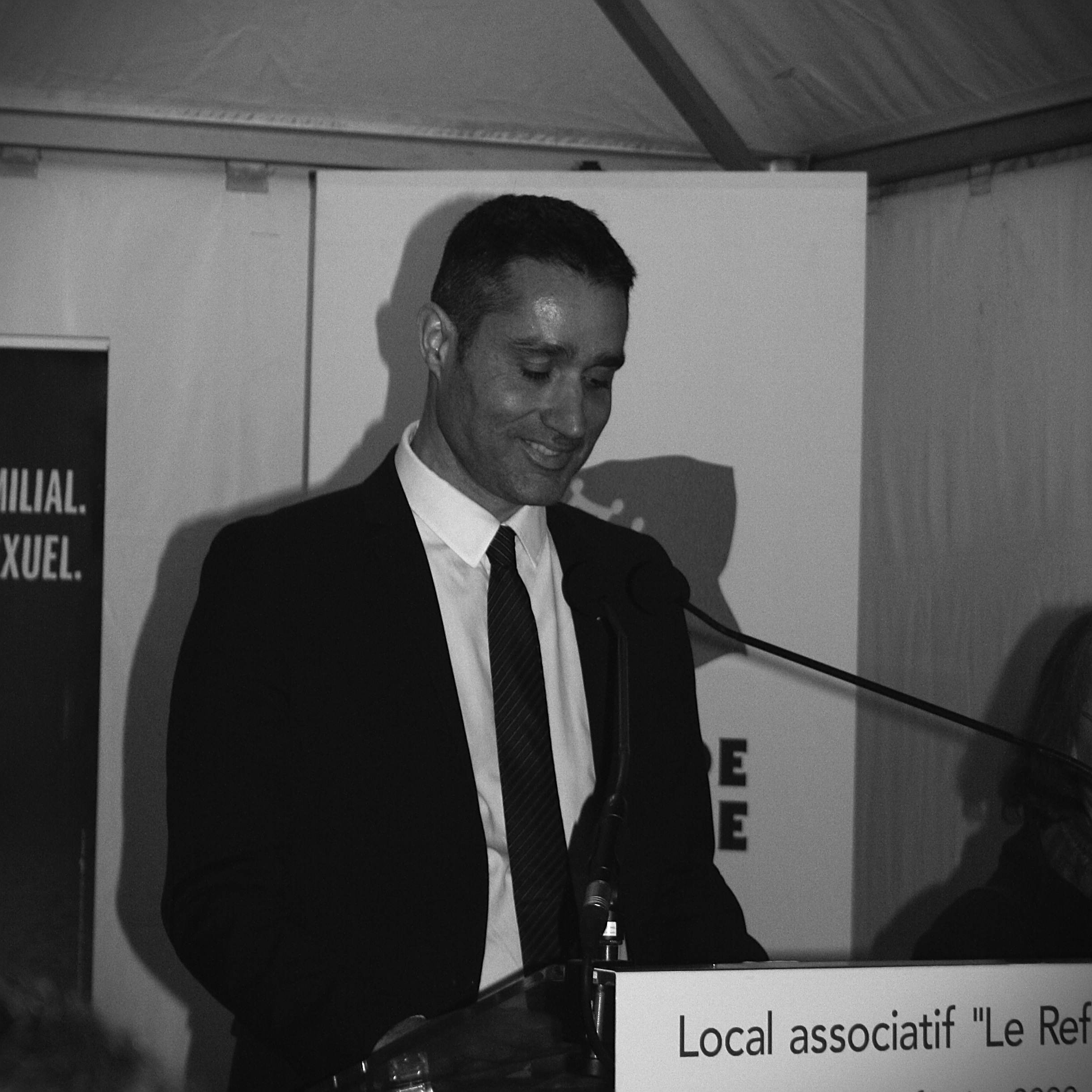

Noguier grew up in Saint-Thibéry in a rural area as the child of winegrowers. He grew up in a religious household. Noguier was not forced into homelessness himself, but did face negativity after his coming out during his teenage years. At the age of 22, Noguier survived a suicide attempt.

He resigned at the end of February 2021, after an external audit confirmed the irregularities revealed by the newspaper Mediapart. He is accused of rape by a young man who had been hosted by Le Refuge.

== Activities ==
'Le Refuge' is primarily intended to accommodate and offer social, medical, and psychological assistance to young adults from 18 to 25 years old who have been victims of homophobia and transphobia. 'Le Refuge' can also accommodate minors 15 to 18 years placed by the juvenile judge. The association also offers young people who wish mediation actions to try to reconnect the broken links with the family. 300 children are welcomed each year, in the day-and-relay local apartments.

The association is recognized as a public utility by decree of 16 August 2011, formally recognizing the essential character of 'Le refuge' as providing support to LGBT youth rejected by their family, and approves the national dimension of the fight against homophobia.

== Structure and organisation ==
The Refuge is an association law 1901, subsidized by the State since 1 January 2007 and helps young people from all over France. It is governed by a Board of Directors consisting of 12 members who are elected for three years per term. Since its inception in 2003, 'Le Refuge' is chaired by Nicolas Noguier, and its CEO is Frederick Gal.

It also has five operational delegations managers who run temporary accommodation arrangements and psychological and social support to Paris, Montpellier, Lyon, Marseille and Toulouse and Lille four antennas, Nîmes, Saint-Denis-de-la-Reunion and Narbonne.

== See also ==
- LGBT social movements
- List of LGBT-related organizations
- List of transgender-related topics
- Queer theology
- Stigma management
