= Catherine Laborde =

French journalist and actress (1951–2025)

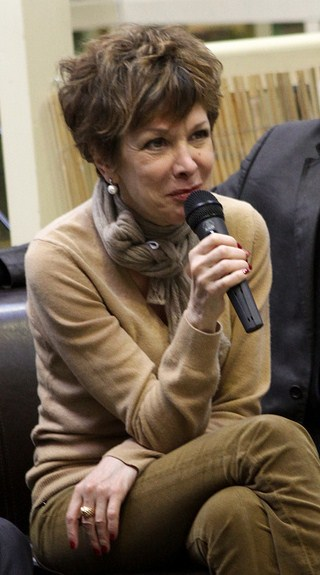
- Laborde in 2010
- Born: Catherine Marie Noëlle Laborde; 8 May 1951; Bordeaux, France
- Died: 28 January 2025 (aged 73); L'Île-d'Yeu, France
- Occupation: Weather presenter
- Employer: TF1
- Spouse: Thomas Stern
- Children: 2 daughters
- Relatives: Françoise Laborde (sister)

Catherine Laborde (8 May 1951 – 28 January 2025) was a French weather presenter and author. She presented for TF1. Laborde died due to complications of dementia with Lewy bodies on 28 January 2025, at the age of 73. She had two younger sisters, Geneviève and Françoise Laborde.

== Publications ==
- with Françoise Laborde (1997). Des sœurs, des mères et des enfants. éditions Jean-Claude Lattès. ISBN 978-2-7096-1820-5..
- Le mauvais temps n'existe pas. éditions du Rocher. 26 May 2005. ISBN 978-2-268-05464-3..
- La douce joie d'être trompée. éditions Anne Carrière. 14 February 2007. ISBN 978-2-84337-416-6..
- Maria del Pilar. éditions Anne Carrière. 8 April 2009. ISBN 978-2-84337-510-1..
- with Thomas Stern (3 February 2010). Si tu ne m'aimes pas, je t'aime. éditions Flammarion. ISBN 978-2-08-123347-8..
- Les chagrins ont la vie dure: Et si un enfant entrait dans votre vie ?. éditions Flammarion. 10 February 2016. ISBN 978-2-08-128051-9..
- Trembler. édition Plon. 11 October 2018. ISBN 978-2-259-26529-4..
- with Thomas Stern (8 October 2020). Amour malade: Quand aimer devient aider. Plon. ISBN 978-2-259-30448-1..
