= María Marván Laborde =

Mexican sociologist and political scientist

- Education: National Autonomous University of Mexico; The New School
- Scientific career
- Fields: Political science; Sociology
- Workplaces: National Autonomous University of Mexico; University of Guadalajara; Instituto de Estudios Superiores de Occidente; Instituto Tecnológico Autónomo de México; Federal Electoral Institute of Mexico

María Marván Laborde is a Mexican sociologist and political scientist. Her research focuses on elections in Mexico, governmental transparency, and privacy policy. In 2011 she was elected to the Federal Electoral Institute of Mexico, a body that she became the president of. She has also been the president of the Governing Council of Transparencia Mexicana, a civil society organization for transparency in Mexican politics.

== Career ==
Laborde attended the Faculty of Political and Social Sciences at the National Autonomous University of Mexico, where she obtained both a bachelor's and a master's degree. She then studied at The New School for Social Research in New York, graduating with a master's degree and a PhD in sociology.

Laborde has been a professor at the National Autonomous University of Mexico, the University of Guadalajara, the Instituto de Estudios Superiores de Occidente, and the Instituto Tecnológico Autónomo de México.

From 2002 to 2011, Laborde was Commissioner of the Federal Institute for Access to Public Information. In 2011, she was elected to serve on the Federal Electoral Institute of Mexico, with a term ending in 2019. She was the first, and by 2020 the only, woman to be the president of that body. In that role, and in her capacity as a researcher of governance and elections, she has been a public advocate for transparency in Mexican government. Laborde regularly speaks publicly on questions regarding Mexico's democratic institutions.

Laborde was also involved in the creation of the Open Government Partnership, and has worked with the Organization of American States. She has also served as President of the Governing Council of Transparencia Mexicana, an NGO that advocates for transparency in the governance of Mexico.
