= Edmond Laborde =

French biologist

Edmond Laborde (1863–1924) was a French biologist. He was the director of the Museum of Natural History of Saint-Denis-de-La-Réunion. He became a member of the Société entomologique de France in 1898.

== Publications ==
Partial list of his publications:

- Bordage, E., 1890. Note sur la caverne magdalénienne du Gros-Roc du Douhet. - impr. de N. Texier (1890).
- Bordage, E., 1899. -Notice sur les parasites du caféier à l'île de la Réunion (Bourbon). -Revue des Cultures coloniales, 4 (28) : 257-261.
- Laborde, E., 1899. IX.—The regeneration of limbs in the Mantidæ, and the constant occurrence of a tetramerous tarsus in limbs regenerated after self-mutilation among the Orthoptera pentamera. - Annals And Magazine of Natural History series 7 1899 4:115-118 10.1080/00222939908678171
- Bordage, E., 1905. Recherches anatomiques et biologiques sur l'autotomie et la régénération chez divers arthropodes.- Impr. de L. Danel (1905)
- Bordage, E., 1905. Recherches anatomiques et biologiques sur l'autotomie et la régénération chez divers arthropodes. - Bulletin scientifique de la France et de la Belgique.
- Bordage, E. 1912-1914. Notes biologiques recueillies à l'île de la Réunion.
- *Bordage, E., 1912-1914. Notes Biologiques Recueillies à l'Ile de la Réunion. Ch.II. Sur la Biologie et l'Ethologie de divers Hymenopteres.
- Bordage, E., 1916. Le repeuplement végétal et animal des îles Krakatoa depuis l'éruption de 1883. -Annales de Géographie, t. 25, n°133, 1916. pp. 1–22.
