= Anna Larroucau Laborde de Lucero =

French-Argentine philanthropist and educator

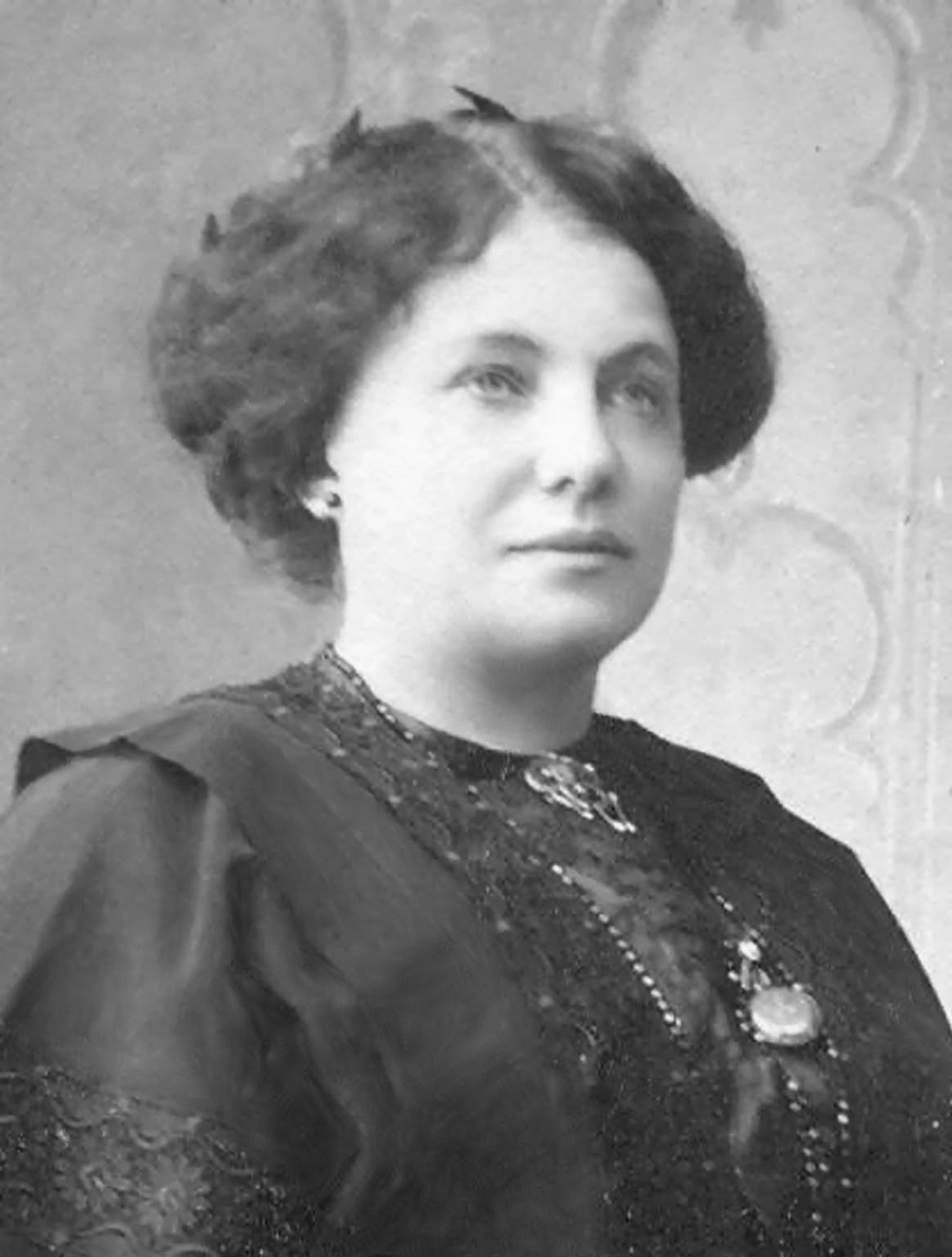
- picture ca. 1911, Santa Fe, Argentina
- Born: March 7, 1864; Oloron-Sainte-Marie, France
- Died: September 3, 1956 (aged 92); San Martín, Mendoza, Argentina
- Occupations: farmer, land tenant
- Known for: Founder the First Company of Charity of San Martin, Mendoza, Argentina & wine industry pioneer

Anna Larroucau Laborde de Lucero (March 7, 1864 – September 3, 1956) was a French-Argentine philanthropist and educator. Pioneer of the Argentine grape and wine industry. She was born in Oloron-Sainte-Marie, France, more precisely in the district of Sainte-Croix, Oloron, rue Mercière Nº13, (erstwhile called rue Centule). She died in San Martín, Mendoza, Argentina.

Anna Larroucau, daughter of Louis Barthélémy Larroucau and Justine Laborde, was the elder of 16 brothers, all born in Oloron.

Towards 1878 Anna migrated to Argentina, in company of her uncles and some brothers. In Argentina, Anna worked as an educational governess and during a certain time, she also taught music and French. She was fluent in Basque, Gascon, Spanish and French. Friend of the writer Jules Supervielle's family. Anna pursued her studies at the famous Collège Sacré-Cœur of Oloron.

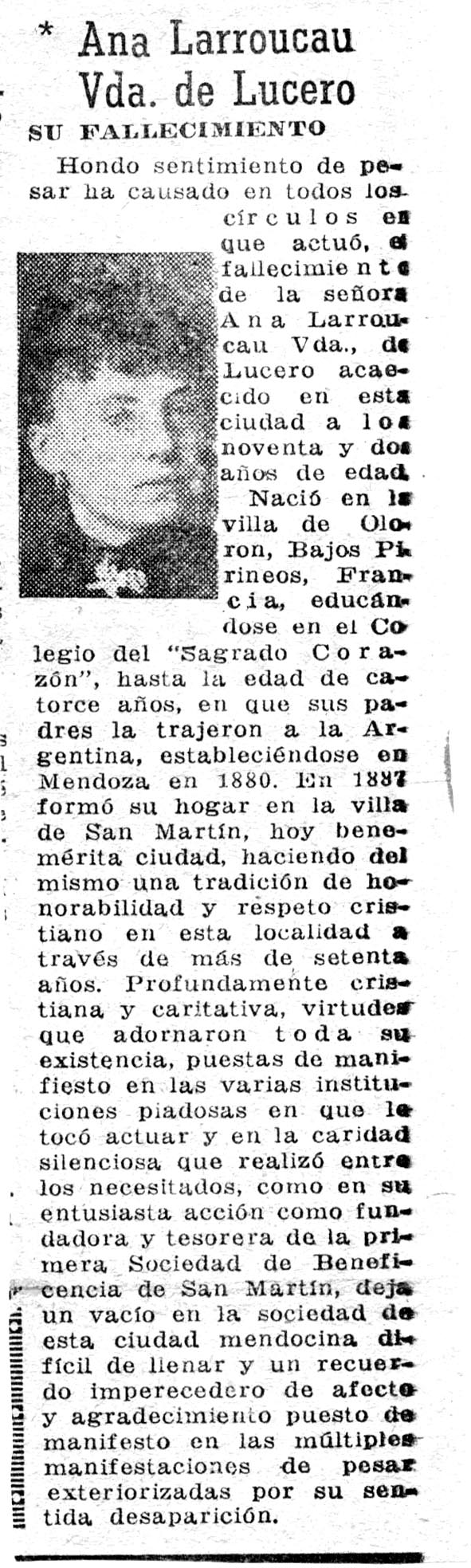
Anna Larroucau's obituary, Newspaper: Los Andes, Mendoza, Argentina, September 4, 1956

Towards 1880, Anna Larroucau introduced in San Martin, Mendoza, the first plants of grapevine of French origin, which she had brought from Bordeaux, France. In all of Mendoza grapevines of Spanish or Italian origins were slowly replaced by these new ones of French origin, providing an improved performance and an optimization of wine. On July 27, 1887, in San Martin, Mendoza, she married Leopoldo Lucero Rincons, a famous farm and cousin of the governor of the neighbor Province of San Luis, General Brigadier Pablo Lucero. The couple Lucero Larroucau will give rise to an important lineage in all of Argentina. Towards 1900 Anna Larroucau, already widow, founded the First Company of Charity of San Martín, Mendoza. During decades she ran the association. Through this institution, she worked for the well-being and the education of childhood in that region of Argentina.
