= Zapateado =

Zapateado may refer to:

- Zapateado (Spain), traditional dance and music of Spain
- Zapateado, a work for violin and piano by Pablo de Sarasate, part of the Spanish Dances, Op. 23
- Zapateado (Mexico), traditional dances of Mexico
