= Horatio LaBorde =

Anglican priest (1821–1891)

Horatio William Laborde (1821–1891) was an Anglican priest in the nineteenth century.

He was born in St Vincent but educated at Gonville and Caius College, Cambridge; and ordained in 1845. After curacies in St Vincent and Trinidad he was Rector of St George with St Andrew, St Vincent from 1852 to 1888; Chaplain to the Bishop of Barbados from 1857 to 1853; Rural Dean of St Vincent from 1864 to 1878 and Archdeacon of St Vincent from 1878 to 1891. He was also a member of the Legislative Council for St Vincent from 1866 until his death on 10 October 1891.
