= Miguel Pro Human Rights Center =

Jesuit organization in Mexico City, Mexico

Coordinates: 19°26′15″N 99°9′35″W

- Abbreviation: PRODH
- Named after: Miguel Pro
- Formation: 1988
- Founded at: Mexico City
- Purpose: Defense of human rights
- Location: Serapio Rendón 57-B San Rafael, México City
- Director: Mario E. Patrón Sánchez
- Website: PRODH

The Miguel Pro Human Rights Center (PRODH) (also Miguel Agustín Pro Juárez Human Rights Center) is a Jesuit human rights society based in Mexico, founded in 1988.

== Activities ==
PRODH works with the Inter-American Human Rights System, and Human Rights Watch, UN treaty bodies and Special Rapporteurs, and with international and regional NGOs.

It advocates for the demilitarization of Mexico's security apparatus. and protection of women against sexual abuse by the police. PRODH also works with the defense of land rights.

PRODH offers training for victims, movements, organizations, and human rights defenders, and facilitates human rights activists' legal, media, and advocacy work in various regions of Mexico. The Center monitors elections and has pointed to misuse of US aid. It offers legal help in obtaining the release of prisoners of conscience. Since September 2001, PRODH has held Consultative Status before the Economic and Social Council of the United Nations and is an Accredited Organization before the Organization of American States.
