= Estafa Maestra =

Corruption scandal in Mexico

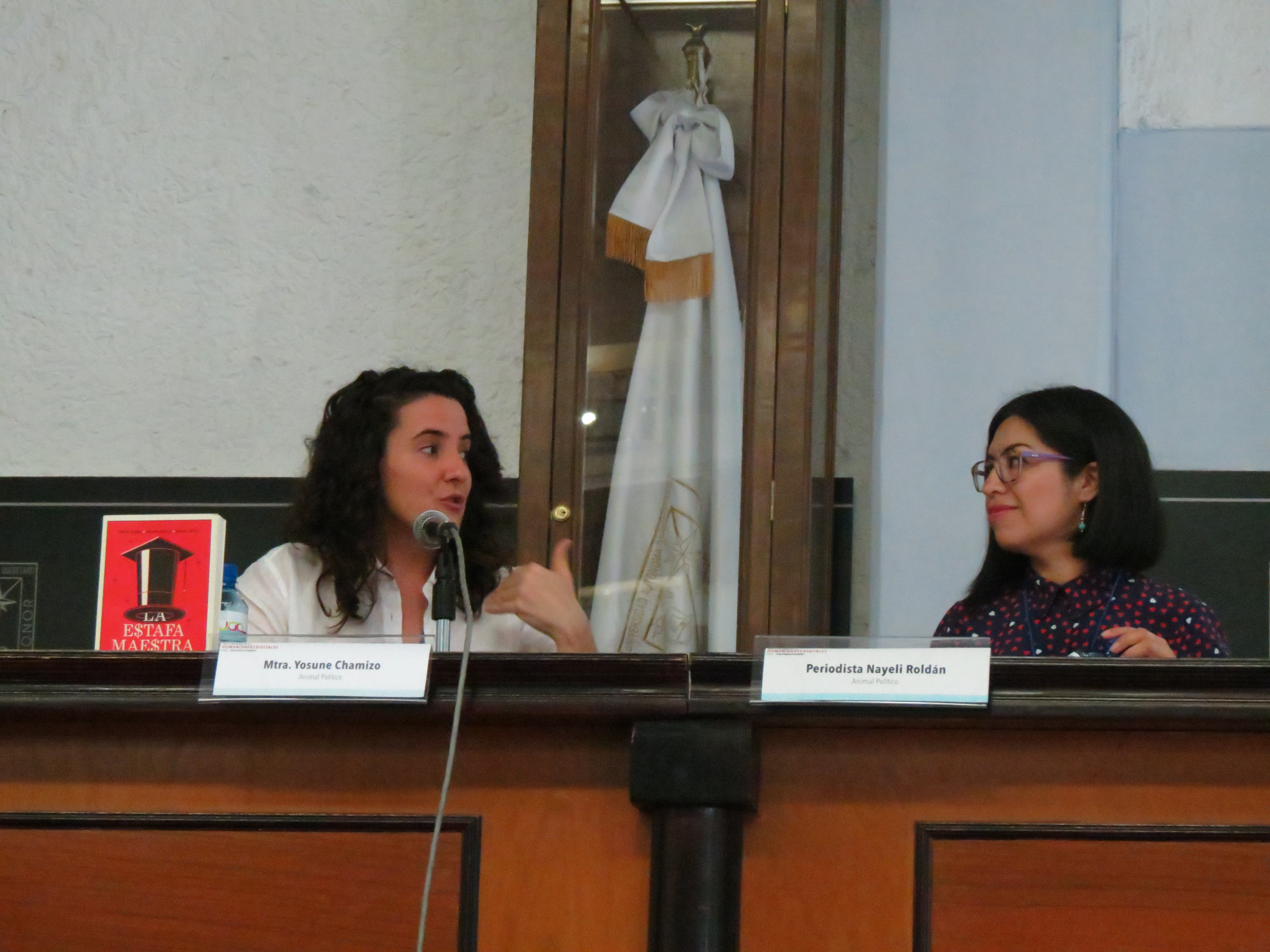
Yosume Chamizo (left) and Nayeli Roldán (right), from Animal Político, discussing the scandal during a university assembly

The Estafa Maestra ("master scam") was a corruption scandal in Mexico involving the diversion of public funds for personal gain. It involved 11 federal government departments, eight public universities and 128 contractor firms, and took place during President Enrique Peña Nieto's term in office (2012–2018) between 2013 and 2014. It was uncovered in 2017 by a joint investigation by Animal Político and Mexicans Against Corruption and Impunity (MCCI) and led to federal investigations and arrests on the highest political level.

== History ==
The Estafa Maestra was a scandal that evolved following the publication of investigations by Animal Político and MCCI in September 2017. Their investigation was at first based on audits by the Superior Auditor of the Federation (ASF) of the public account from 2012 and 2013. The ASF found irregularities in contracts awarded to companies carrying out work as part of social and development programmes. The money came from public funds assigned to the eleven federal departments involved in the scandal; the three most present ones were Secretariat of Welfare (SEDESOL), FOVISSSTE, Banobras and Pemex. These departments illegally gave money to at least eight public universities, violating the Public Sector Procurement Law (Ley General de Adquisiciones), which used it to hire and pay contractors.

Many of these contractors turned out to be shell companies or to be involved in earlier corruption allegations. In addition, it was found that most of them did not provide the goods or services they were paid for. The universities acted as reputable intermediaries to conceal the shady contracts and tolerated incomplete service deliveries. These entities wrote invoices for services they never received. In turn, they allegedly received a commission of 10–15% of the contract value for their involvement in the fraud. The beneficiaries of this fraud were corrupt officials who profited from kickbacks and participation in shell companies. The leadership profited from commissions for their involvement in issuing the illegal contracts and turning a blind eye to non-compliance with them, as well as to the businesses and individuals behind them, all the while raking in government funds.

== Connection to Adán Augusto López & Odebrecht ==
=== Adán Augusto López ===
According to media investigations, former Secretary of the Interior Adán Augusto López Hernández and his brother Melchor López Hernández have been linked to companies involved in the corruption scheme known as La Estafa Maestra. Mexicanos Contra la Corrupción y la Impunidad (MCCI) documented that the notary offices of Adán Augusto López and Melchor López Hernández in Tabasco, Mexico, were used to incorporate several companies that were later included on the Servicio de Administración Tributaria (SAT) list of entities classified as companies that issue simulated invoices (Empresas que Facturan Operaciones Simuladas, EFOS), commonly referred to as shell companies. These firms were reported to have been used in financial operations tied to the diversion of public funds. Additionally, documents reviewed by journalists show that the former Secretary of Mobility of Tabasco, appointed during López Hernández’s tenure as governor, used the same notarial offices to found other companies subsequently listed by the SAT as EFOS.

=== Odebrecht ===
Investigations by MCCI also found that two lawyers specialized on the incorporation of firms were involved in the creation of at least six companies linked to the Estafa Maestra corruption scheme, as well as 13 additional companies connected to the embezzlement of public funds. These companies shared the same address in Monterrey, Mexico, as a firm identified by the International Consortium of Investigative Journalists (ICIJ) as being connected to Odebrecht’s so-called “bribery division," which was part of the Odebrecht Scandal.

According to earlier investigations, the Brazilian construction company Odebrecht employed a similar modus operandi, using simulated service contracts to justify financial transfers that were ultimately used to pay bribes. This mechanism closely resembled the scheme used in the Estafa Maestra case.

Although Andrés Manuel López Obrador and Claudia Sheinbaum's governments promised to investigate and prosecute those involved, impunity has largely prevailed and most of the money has not been recovered.
