= Europolitics =

Former European newspaper

- Owner: Europe Information Service S.A.
- Founded: 1972
- Ceased publication: 2015
- Language: English, French
- Headquarters: Brussels, Belgium
- Website: europolitics.info

Europolitics (French: Europolitique) was a daily European affairs publication, founded in 1972 in Brussels. It served as an information tool for key stakeholders and professional observers of the European Union. In 2015, after the bankruptcy of Europe Information Service S.A. (Europolitics publisher), Contexte bought the defunct newspaper and its website in 2015 but said it had no plans to revive the publication.

== History ==
Europolitique (initially entitled European Report in English) was founded in November 1972 by journalists of AGRA, an agriculture press agency backed financially by French cereal and sugar-beet producers. The founders sought to develop a non-partisan European publication to compete with the only European medium existing at the time, the news bulletin of Agence Europe, which was considered a ‘semi-official journal’ "at the crossroads of professional journalism and the federalist political commitment". Europolitics was bought in 1977 by its Editor-in-Chief, Gérard Rousselot, and several of its journalists. In the early 1980s, it was acquired by Groupe Expansion, was taken over in 1994 by Havas and then absorbed by Vivendi in 1998. After two years of Belgian ownership (2003–2005), Europolitics was bought, on 1 October 2005, by the French group SIAC, a publisher specialized in agriculture and the food industry (which in the meantime had become the owner of AGRA). On 23 February 2006, Europolitics/Europolitque became a daily printed on A4 sheets, with a more reader-friendly layout and open to advertising and guest opinions. In terms of content, it striven to set itself apart from traditional newsletters, which rely on press releases, by giving precedence to anticipation, analysis and reflection.

== Content ==
The mission of the newspaper was to keep decision makers informed from the earliest stages of draft directives and regulations in preparation or negotiation and on the unfolding of the whole decision-making process that resulted in European Union law. Its coverage focused on a range of institutions: the European Commission, Council of Ministers, European Parliament, European Court of Justice, European Central Bank, European Court of Auditors, Economic and Social Committee, Committee of the Regions, European Ombudsman, and European Data Protection Supervisor. It generally provided critical, thorough and objective analysis of European policies, decisions and initiatives.

== Operations ==
It was an independent medium and it was sold exclusively by subscription - its only source of financing, apart from some carefully selected advertisements. Its multinational editorial staff practiced a non-partisan approach, rejecting all ideological, political or economic control.

Topics covered by Europolitics:

- Policies, namely proposals in the development stage, negotiations and compromises that make up the everyday activity of joint decisions.
- Economics, finance, trade and social affairs, with details and insights into measures taken in common, sector by sector.
- Views and perspectives.
- Analyses beyond mere facts.
- Special features.
- Downloadable documents and useful web links.
- Interviews with experts and officials.
- Guest opinions, available for free at www.schumansquare.eu, the Europolitics forum.
- Weekly and daily agenda of the EU institutions’ activities.

== Number of issues ==
225 issues a year

Published five days a week (an average of 20 A4 pages a day), published Monday to Friday.

The print version is distributed every morning in Brussels by mail (delivery times in other countries vary according to distance). The printable version (PDF) is available the day before publication, at around 19.00.

20 special features a year (‘Insight’), included in the daily (e.g., The global water challenge - Airbus A400M - EU/US relations with Obama in office - Movers and shakers in Washington who count for the EU - Committee of the Regions turns 15 - Enlargement
Five years on, ten years ahead - Gas and electricity: Third liberalisation package - Competition policy put to the test by the crisis - Atalanta: EU takes on pirates - Three heads for Europe - Aviation responds to climate change).

10 special editions (e.g., The Lisbon Treaty
Here is what changes - The lessons of the Irish referendum - Europe tackles climate change - The European Parliament turns 50 - Europe of Security and Defence: New situation, new threats).

8 periodicals

- Europolitics environment – 22 issues a year (English and French)
- Europolitics energy – 22 issues a year (English and French)
- Europolitics agriculture – 22 issues a year (English and French)
- Europolitics information society – 11 issues a year (English and French)
- Europolitics social – 11 issues a year (English and French)
- Europolitics transport – 11 issues a year (English and French)
- Europolitics new neighbours – 11 issues a year (English)
- Europolitics monthly – 11 issues a year (English and French)

== Readership ==
Europolitics targets a professional public interested in anticipating the European Union's decisions and influencing them upstream. The daily is considered the information tool of choice by all the Brussels-based lobbies. It also meets the particular needs of business executives, national and regional officials and members of parliament in the EU member states, who seek a more thorough understanding of the challenges and need to develop a European awareness.

This specific public comprises four sectors in more or less equal proportions: Economic establishment and market players: industry, trade and enterprises. Their partners: professional associations and federations, lawyers, consultants, unions and NGOs. Political establishment: governments, embassies, national parliaments, regions of Europe and EU institutions. Observers and opinion makers: higher education institutes, universities, think tanks and media.

With its different types of subscriptions and its print and/or electronic versions, Europolitics directly reaches 10,000 readers in the private sector and public institutions. This potential readership of more than 30,000 professionals is based mainly in the European Union, although subscribers are located in 65 countries across every continent.

Two-thirds of Europolitics readers subscribe to the English version (steady growth compared with the number of French-speaking readers), including in Brussels. Since the end of the 20th century, even before the European Union's 'big bang' enlargement to ten new member states (2004), English has become the main working language of the European Union, outdistancing French and German.

== Ownership ==
Europolitics was published by a limited liability company incorporated under Belgian law, Europe Information Service (EIS) S.A., with French capital. At mid-2009, the shareholding structure of EIS S.A. was as follows: 75%: SIAC, René-Charles Millet, Paris 10%: LG Holding, Daniel Guéguen, lobbyist, Brussels 7.5%: SIA (vegetable oils and proteins), Paris 7.5%: Naples Investissement (sugar industry), Paris Individual shareholders: M. Delattre, M. Paoloni, Brussels
