= Segalmex scandal =

2019 corruption scandal in Mexico

In 2019, Mexican Food Security (Segalmex), a governmental agency managing a food welfare program, became involved in a corruption scandal involving alleged irregularities in its contracting practices. Established during the administration of President Andrés Manuel López Obrador (AMLO), the agency awarded contracts to shell companies, paying suppliers in full upfront for food commodities while frequently refraining from requesting delivery of the goods. Several of the shell companies were owned by Segalmex officials, who allegedly profited from the scheme. Estimates of the financial impact vary; the Superior Auditor of the Federation (ASF) reported losses exceeding MXN$15 billion, while federal government figures placed the amount at MXN$9.5 billion. The case is considered one of the largest corruption scandals of the AMLO administration.

== Background ==
Mexican Food Security (Spanish: Seguridad Alimentaria Mexicana, Segalmex) was a Mexican government agency that was established in 2019 under the presidency of Andrés Manuel López Obrador (AMLO). It aimed to supply basic goods at fixed prices to impoverished people, while subsidising national production and sourcing goods from small-scale farmers in the agricultural sector. Segalmex was the umbrella institution for two departments: Diconsa and Liconsa. In 2019, the agency was involved in a corruption scandal over alleged irregularities concerning its contracts. In 2025, President Claudia Sheinbaum merged Diconsa with Segalmex and changed the name to Alimentación para el Bienestar (Food for Wellbeing).

Ignacio Ovalle Fernández served as the institution's director from 2019 to 2022. A close associate of AMLO, Ovalle previously led the CONASUPO (Compañía Nacional de Subsistencias Populares), the forerunner of Segalmex, during President Carlos Salinas de Gortari's tenure in the late 1980s. His time as director of CONASUPO was marred by allegations of corruption. During his tenure as Segalmex director, he was accused by federal authorities of authorizing the illegal purchase of stock certificates worth over MXN$100 million. In April 2022, Ovalle was transferred to INAFED (Instituto Nacional para el Federalismo y el Desarrollo Municipal), and Leonel Cota Montaño took over his position as director in April 2022. Throughout AMLO's tenure, Ovalle was not prosecuted and retained his support.

As of 2023, the Attorney General's Office (FGR) had investigated 87 individuals in connection with the Segalmex scandal, 26 of whom had been arrested. Estimates of the losses vary: the Superior Audit of the Federation (ASF) reported MXN$15.15 billion unaccounted for during the agency's first three years, while the AMLO administration acknowledged irregularities totaling MXN$9.5 billion, of which MXN$4.7 billion had reportedly been resolved. The case has been described as one of the largest corruption scandals in AMLO's presidency.

== Investigation ==
In 2021, Mexicans Against Corruption and Impunity (MCCI) reported that Segalmex had granted MXN$797 million in assets to six shell companies and identified contract irregularities involving the Institute for Social Security and Services for State Workers (ISSSTE) and the Secretariat of Agrarian, Land, and Urban Development (SEDATU). Payments were issued for social welfare goods that were either not delivered or only partially delivered, and Segalmex made financial investments with public funds that lacked clear relevance to its statutory mandate. Investigators also stated that officials within Segalmex received bribes from suppliers holding contracts with the agency. In some cases, Segalmex contracts were awarded without a public tender process, and contractual obligations were not fulfilled.

Manuel Lozano Jiménez, who had previously served in an executive capacity at Segalmex as its Director of Commerce, was arrested in Argentina in June 2023 on charges of embezzlement, money laundering, and organized crime. The aforementioned charges arose from a period during which he was responsible for contracts relating to suppliers. The position of Secretary for Administration and Finances within the Segalmex was held by René Gavira Segresté until December 2023, when he was arrested and charged with corruption, organized crime and money laundering.

In December 2023, the FGR charged René Gavira Segreste, the financial and administrative secretary of Segalmex, with organized crime, embezzlement, money laundering, and abuse of authority in connection with the case. According to the FGR's investigation, Gavira Segreste purchased an apartment in San Antonio, Texas, United States, in a 2022 transaction authorities allege was linked to bribery. In June 2024, the FGR requested that U.S. authorities seize the property; however, it was quickly sold by his son, René Federico Gavira Martínez. The investigation also found that Segreste had purchased the property from an individual linked to Ignacio Ovalle and companies holding public contracts.

Segalmex had a business relationship with Grupo Vicente Suárez 73. This company was founded by Alejandro Puente Córdoba, a businessman from the telecommunications sector. Two days after the AMLO government took office in 2018, the company changed its focus to livestock and agriculture. Within a year, it obtained a Liconsa contract to supply a minimum of 400,000 liters of milk per day, followed shortly by a similar contract. Despite lacking experience or production capacity in the sector and relying on subcontractors, the company later received an additional contract from Diconsa to supply fruit. Collectively, these contracts brought the total amount received from Segalmex to MXN$4.5 billion.

In July 2024, the Secretariat of Finance and Public Credit ruled that they would keep the results of the Segalmex investigation confidential.

=== Modus operandi ===
Segalmex officials awarded contracts and authorized upfront payments to companies for the delivery of goods, including sugar, grains and fertilizers. To facilitate these transactions, the agency adopted a practice known as recepción jurídica ("legal receipt"), under which suppliers received full payment at the time of purchase while the goods remained in their custody until Segalmex requested delivery – a request the agency frequently avoided or delayed issuing. In practice, many of the companies involved failed to deliver the contracted goods, delivered only a portion of the agreed quantities, or supplied inferior products. Despite having received full payment, these suppliers were not effectively sanctioned, enabling public funds to be diverted.

The money obtained through these contracts was often directed to individuals operating behind shell companies, who were often not the persons listed in the Mexican company register. These companies were sometimes established using stolen or misappropriated identities, with the victims named as owners unaware that their personal information had been used. Companies were also registered at misleading addresses, such as large office buildings with no evidence of presence or small sheds presented as corporate headquarters.

Companies awarded with contracts were reportedly required to pay bribes, estimated at around 3% of the contract value, via other shell companies linked to Segalmex officials or their intermediaries. In some cases, business people transferred properties or other valuables to officials or their relatives at below-market prices, effectively acting as indirect bribe payments. Procurement procedures were weak and favored companies participating in the scheme. Tender processes were tampered with or completely omitted to ensure that contracts were awarded to specific suppliers.

Public funds from Segalmex were used to purchase financial bonds and other high-risk investment instruments, despite regulations prohibiting public entities from investing in speculative capital markets. These transactions were carried out with Ovalle's approval. The ASF documented that MXN$950 million were used to buy bonds between 2019 and 2020. Although most of these resources were eventually recovered, the profits generated by these investments were not fully reported. Oversight and accountability mechanisms were weakened by conflicts of interest and institutional overlap. Close relatives of senior auditing officials held positions within Segalmex while the agency was subject to open investigations. In parallel, personnel from Segalmex was transferred to institutions responsible for investigation and prosecution in those cases, including the appointment of a former Segalmex executive to advisory roles within prosecutorial authorities.

== Aftermath ==
In 2024, the administration of Obrador's successor, President Claudia Sheinbaum, reduced Segalmex to a small department of Diconsa, which had been one of its subsidiaries, and deprived it of its purchasing and sales powers, making further embezzlement by it impossible.
