= Robert Giffard de Moncel =

- Born: c. 1587; Autheuil, Perche, France
- Died: 14 June 1668 (aged 80–81); Beauport, Canada, New France
- Occupations: surgeon, apothecary, colonising seigneur, member of the Communauté des Habitants, first doctor of the Hôtel-Dieu de Québec, doctor in ordinary to the king of France.
- Spouse: Marie Regnouard (married 12 February 1628)
- Children: 2 sons, 4 daughters
- Parent(s): Guillaume Giffard and Louise Viron

Robert Giffard de Moncel (c. 1587 – 14 June 1668) was a Perche-based surgeon and apothecary who became New France's first colonizing seigneur.

== Initial voyages ==
As a naval surgeon, Giffard made several voyages to Quebec between 1621 and 1627. He maintained a cabin called la Canardière at the mouth of the Petite or Sainte-Croix or, now, Saint-Charles rivers on the côte (shore) de Beauport east of Québec.

On a return voyage in 1628, he was captured by the English adventurer Sir David Kirke and lost considerable equipment for colonization. Giffard returned to France. Kirke later captured and held Quebec until its return to the French in 1632.

== Percheron immigration movement ==
In the three decades of the 17th century starting in 1634, Robert Giffard spearheaded the Percheron immigration movement that recruited more than 300 tradesmen and workers, many of whom settled in Canada, New France. In so doing, Giffard working closed with the Juchereau brothers, Noël, Jean and their half-brother Pierre, with origins in Perche's Tourouvre hamlet. The Juchereau brothers were thus between 1646 and 1651 responsible for forty-one engagement contracts destined for Canada that were largely executed by the Tourouvre-based Choiseau notaries. The Percheron Immigration movement is noteworthy as ancient Perche province provided a lopsidedly, disproportionally large number of New France pioneers and descendants compared to the rest immigrants from France.

== From colonizing seigneur to nobility ==
On 15 January 1634, Giffard was granted one of New France's the first seigneuries and he returned to the colony accompanied by his wife and two children. The colony - with Samuel de Champlain still as Governor - was continuing to experience a lack of immigration. Giffard's grant of a league of land along the Beauport and Montmorency rivers was in exchange for his commitment to bring other settlers. His recruitment efforts in ancient Perche province, yielded other well-known pioneers including: Jean Guyon du Boisson, Zacharie Cloutier, Henri Pinguet, Noël Langlois, Noël Juchereau and Marin Boucher from ancient Perche province.

In 1636, the marriage contract for Robert Drouin and Cloutier's daughter Anne was signed in Giffard's house, at one time the oldest house in Canada. This is the earliest marriage contract in Canada's archives.

In 1637, he was involved in a conflict with the Iroquois near Trois-Rivières.

By 1640, he became the first doctor of the Hôtel-Dieu de Québec—the first hospital in Canada and in North America north of Mexico—an apothecary and even “doctor in ordinary” to the king, a purely honorary but prestigious title.

In 1645, Giffard helped found the newly established trading company, the Communauté des Habitants, which was open to all inhabitants in principle but which only the wealthiest colonists could join in practice. Severely dissatisfied, he went with Paul de Chomedey the following year back to France to convince the Crown officials to disband his fellow directors of the company, which they did, replacing them with a regulatory council in Quebec.

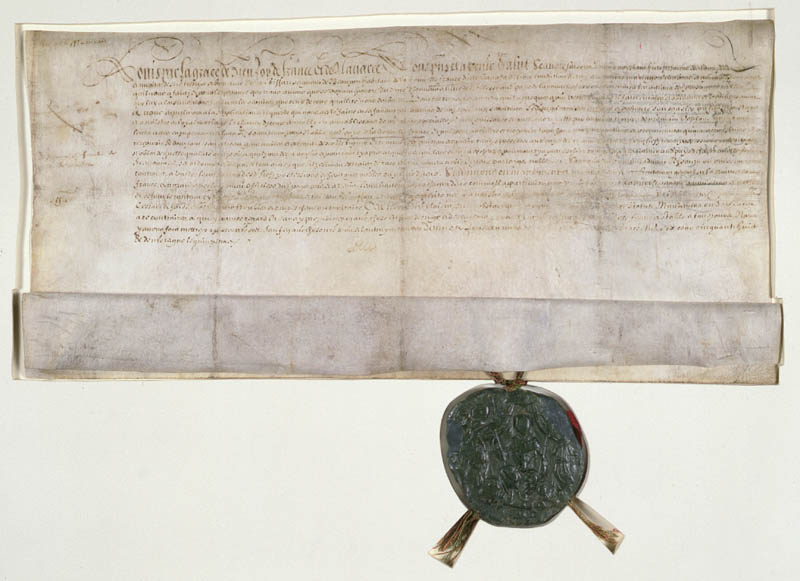
1658 letters of nobility granted to Giffard.

In 1646, Giffard obtained an explicit order from the governor of the colony, Charles de Montmagny, that ended a nine-year dispute with Guyon and Cloutier in Giffard's favour. Since their arrival in the colony, the two tenants had refused to provide foi et hommage (fealty and homage) to Giffard, as was his right as seigneur. This was an early case of New World resistance to Old World systems of governance. Refusing to accept him as their superior, they did not stake their lands or pay him annual taxes. Such cases of censitaire refractoriness filled the time of the courts for the duration of the seigneurial system, both during the French regime and under the English.

By 1658, his service was recognized by the granting of two more seigneuries, being named to the king's new council of Quebec, and becoming one of Canada's few citizens to be ennobled.

Giffard died in Beauport on 14 June 1668. The Bishop officiated his funeral and his tomb is within the hospital.

== Legacy ==
In 1912, a neighbourhood of Beauport, Quebec was named after Giffard and he is commemorated by a monument there.

In 1935, Quebec City named a street Robert-Giffard Avenue.

In 1976, the provincial mental health hospital took the name the Centre hospitalier Robert Giffard, continuing an association with mental health. In 1845, Giffard's manor house begins being used as an asylum accommodating 23 mental health patients.

== See also ==
- Louis Juchereau de St. Denis, grandson of Giffard
