= Bresolettes =

- Part of Tourouvre au Perche
- Location of Bresolettes
- Location within France Location within Normandy
- Coordinates: 48°37′50″N 0°37′36″E
- Country: France
- Region: Normandy
- Department: Orne
- Arrondissement: Mortagne-au-Perche
- Canton: Tourouvre
- Commune: Tourouvre au Perche
- Area^{1}: 5.84 km^{2} (2.25 sq mi)
- Elevation: 270 m (890 ft)
- Highest elevation: 297 m (974 ft)
- Lowest elevation: 244 m (801 ft)
- Population (2023): 23
  - Density: 3.9/km^{2} (10/sq mi)
- Time zone: UTC+01:00 (CET)
  - Summer (DST): UTC+02:00 (CEST)
- Postal code: 61190
- ^{1} French Land Register data, which excludes lakes, ponds, glaciers > 1 km^{2} (0.386 sq mi or 247 acres) and river estuaries.

Bresolettes (French pronunciation: [bʁəzɔlɛt]) is a former commune in the Orne department in the Basse-Normandie region in northwestern France. On 1 January 2016, it was merged into the new commune of Tourouvre au Perche.

== Geography ==
Situated in a wooded area of the Perche province, the village is in the Clearing of Bresolettes, a site registered and protected since 1985.

== See also ==
- Communes of the Orne department
