= François Jules Edmond Got =

French actor and librettist (1822–1901)

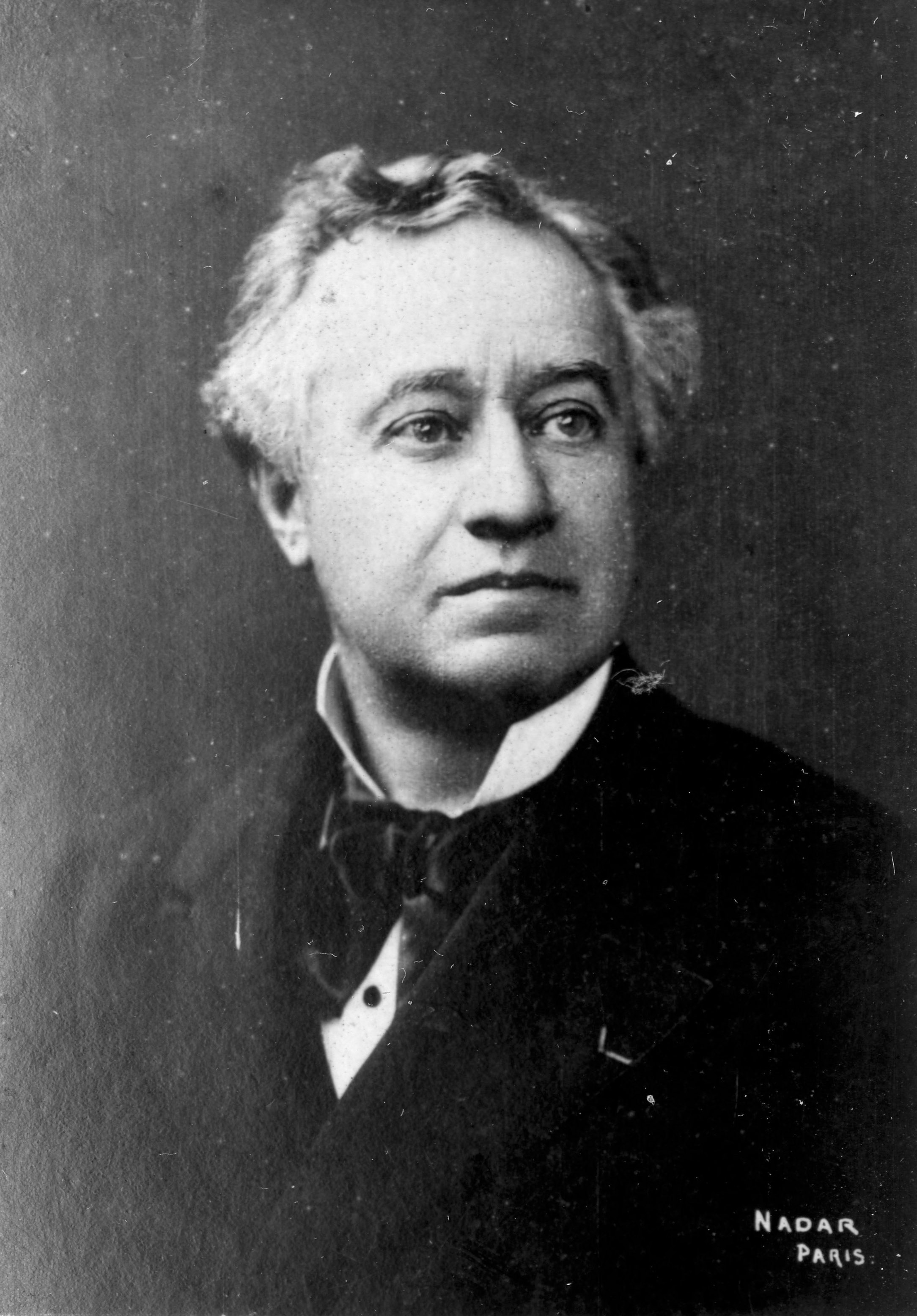
Edmond Got

François Jules Edmond Got (English: /ɡoʊ/ GOH, French: [fʁɑ̃swa ʒyl ɛdmɔ̃ ɡo]; 1 October 1822, in Lignerolles, Orne – 21 March 1901, in Passy, a district in Paris) was a French stage actor, comedian, and opera librettist.

Edmond Got entered the Conservatoire de Paris in 1841, winning the second prize for comedy that year and the first in 1842. After a year of military service he made his debut at the Comédie Française on 17 July 1844, as Alexis in Les Héritiers and Mascarelles in Les Précieuses ridicules. He was immediately admitted pensionnaire, and became sociétaire in 1850. By special permission of the emperor in 1866 he played at the Odéon in Emile Augier's Contagion. His golden jubilee at the Théâtre Français was celebrated in 1894, and he made his final appearance the year after.

Got was a fine representative of the grand style of French acting, and was much admired in England as well as in Paris. He wrote two librettos for operas by Edmond Membrée (1820-1892), François Villon (1857) and L'Esclave (1874). In 1881, he was decorated with the cross of the Legion of Honour.
