= Giguère =

Giguère or Giguere is a surname. Notable people with the surname include:

- Daniel Giguère (born 1957), Canadian politician
- Élizabeth Giguère (born 1997), Canadian ice hockey player
- François Giguère (born 1963), Canadian former general manager of the Colorado Avalanche
- Jean-Sébastien Giguère (born 1977), Canadian hockey goaltender
- Louis Giguère (1911–2002), Canadian senator
- Nathalie Giguère (born 1973), Canadian swimmer
- Paul-Antoine Giguère (1910–1987), Canadian academic and chemist
- Réal Giguère (born 1933), Canadian talk and game show host
- Robert Giguère (1616–1709) early pioneer in New France
- Samuel Giguère (born 1985), Canadian football player
