= Lignerolles =

Lignerolles is the name or part of the name of several communes in France:

- Lignerolles, Allier
- Lignerolles, Côte-d'Or
- Lignerolles, Eure
- Lignerolles, Indre
- Lignerolles, Orne
