= Henri Jacques François Olivier =

French cleric and lichenologist (1848–1922)

Henry Jacques François Olivier
- Born: 1848; Saint-Hilaire-les-Mortagne (now Saint-Hilaire-le-Châtel), Orne, France
- Died: 1922 (aged 73–74); Bazoches-au-Houlme, Orne, France
- Scientific career
- Fields: Lichenology
- Author abbrev. (botany): H.Olivier

Henri Jacques François Olivier (1848–1922) was a French Roman Catholic cleric and lichenologist. He worked as a parish priest in the department of Orne and became known for studies on the lichen funga of France and other parts of the world.

Olivier was born in 1848 in Saint-Hilaire-les-Mortagne (now Saint-Hilaire-le-Châtel) (Orne). He was ordained priest in Sées in 1874, first serving as vicar in Bazoches. In 1886 he became parish priest in Bivilliers and, from 1892, in Bazoches-au-Houlme. During the later part of his career he developed a strong interest in botany, particularly in lichens. From 1880 until 1884 Olivier issued the exsiccata work Herbier des lichens de L'Orne et du Calvados, publié par L.'Abbé H. Olivier. He published around fifty papers, including monographic works and many contributions on the lichen funga of western and north-western France, as well as studies on lichens from more distant regions such as China, Chile, and Colombia. For his scientific work he received a prize from the Académie internationale de géographie botanique.

Several fungal or lichen species have been named in his honour, including Caloplaca olivieri Werner (1964); Cladochytrium olivieri Har. (1914); Laestadia olivieri Vouaux (1912); Lecanora olivieri Zahlbr. (1914); and Lepiota olivieri Barla (1886).

== Selected publications ==
- Olivier, H. (1888). "Glossologie lichénique, ou vocabulaire alphabétique et raisonné des principaux termes spéciaux à l'étude de la lichénologie" [Lichen glossary, or alphabetical and reasoned vocabulary of the main terms specific to the study of lichenology]. Revue de botanique (in French). 7: 32–59.
- Olivier, H. (1890). "Étude sur les Pertusaria de la flore française" [Study of the Pertusaria of the French flora]. Revue de botanique (in French). 8: 9–25.
- Olivier, H. (1894). "Étude sur les principaux Parmelia, Parmeliopsis, Physcia et Xanthoria de la flore française" [Study of the principal Parmelia, Parmeliopsis, Physcia and Xanthoria of the French flora]. Revue de botanique (in French). 12: 51–99.
