= Noël Juchereau =

French early pioneer in New France (now Québec, Canada)

- Born: Tourouvre, Perche, France
- Baptised: 30 August 1593
- Died: shortly before July 31, 1648 (aged 54); Orléans, France
- Education: Studies in humanities, Bachelor of Law
- Occupations: Member of Company of One Hundred Associates, Head Clerk of the Communauté des Habitants
- Title: sieur des Chatelets

Noël Juchereau, Sieur des Chatelets (30 August 1593 – c. 31 July 1648) was an early pioneer in New France (now Québec, Canada), and a member of the Company of One Hundred Associates since in formation in 1627.

== Origins ==
Juchereau was baptised in Tourouvre, Perche, France on 30 August 1593 to Jean Juchereau (1567–1628) of Tourouvre and his first wife Jeanne Creste (d.1608). His father's family was from Mortagne, Perche, France and prominent in government. His mother's family were wealthy land owners from Tourouvre and L'Hôme. Juchereau had one brother, Jean Juchereau de Maur (1592–1672), who had two sons Nicolas Juchereau, sieur de St-Denis and Jean Juchereau, sieur de la Ferté.

== The Juchereau brothers ==
Noël Juchereau and his brother Jean, with origins in Perche's Tourouvre hamlet, played a key role in the Percheron Immigration Mouvement toward Québec, Canada Nouvelle-France in the XVII^{th} century working closely with Robert Giffard, who spearheaded the movement, to recruit future settlers to the region. The Juchereau brothers were responsible for forty-one engagement contract destined for Canada largely executed by Tourouvre-based Choiseau notaries between 1646 and 1651.

Noël and Jean Juchereau were half-brothers to Pierre Juchereau, sieur des Moulineaux, who helped in the recruitment of engagés on behalf of Jean et Noël Juchereau. Pierre Juchereau never crossed the ocean to Canada.

== New France ==
Noël Juchereau completed studies in the humanities and law, and was granted a Bachelor of Law degree. Juchereau first traveled to Québec in 1634, followed by his brother Jean with his family, in 1643.

Juchereau was an active figure in New France. The governor of Québec frequently sought his help with delicate legal matters.

Juchereau and Pierre Legardeur de Repentigny, originally created the Communauté des Habitants. He was appointed their head clerk in 1645. As a church warden from 1645 to 1646 he prominently participated in religious ceremonies central to Québec's social life.

Historian Benjamin Sulte believed that he was acting as an agent for Rosée and Cheffault who wanted a grant of part of the trade in New France from the Company of One Hundred Associates. The de Maur seigneurie, west of Québec city was granted to Jean Juchereau and Noël Juchereau in 1647. This concession of land was inherited by brother Jean when Noël died.

== Death ==
Noël Juchereau travelled to France in 1647 as a delegate of the Communauté des Habitants to obtain related organization changes. He drowned shortly before July 31, 1648, in Orléans, France.

== Bibliographie ==
Key websites, acronyms & descriptions

- "Noël Juchereau des Chatelets". Dictionary of Canadian Biography.
- Fichier Origine - Répertoire informatisé de la Fédération québécoise des sociétés de généalogie en partenariat avec la Fédération française de généalogie
- Nos Origines - Site web, Généalogie du Québec et française d'Amérique
- PREFEN - Programme de recherche sur l'émigration des français en Nouvelle-France, Université de Caen

Bibliography

- Arthur, Stanley C.; George Campbell Huchet de Kernion (2009). Old Families of Louisiana. Genealogical Publishing Com. pp. 149–156. ISBN 978-0806346885.
- Binet, Réjean (2016). "Robert Giffard : les engagés de 1634" (PDF). L'Ancêtre. 42 (313). Revue de la Société de généagolie de Québec: 98–112.
- Carpin, Gervais (1999). Le Reseau du Canada: Étude du mode migratoire de la France vers Ie Nouvelle-France (1628-1662)] (PDF).
- Charbonneau, Hubert (1970). Tourouvre-au-Perche aux XVIIe et XVIIIe siècles : étude de démographie historique. Paris: Pr. Univ. de France.
- Choquette, Leslie (1997). Frenchmen into peasants : modernity and tradition in the peopling of French Canada. Cambridge & London: Harvard University Press. pp. 212–215. ISBN 0-674-32315-7.
- Drolet, Yves (2009). "Tables généalogiques de la noblesse Québecois du XVIIe et XVIIIe siècle" (PDF). pp. See especially Tables 107 &108.
- Fichier Origine 242190 (2014). "Noël Juchereau".
- Généalogie Québec 41409 (Online). "Noël Juchereau (1593 - 1649)".
- Huot, Giselle (1998). Édition critique des oeuvres en prose d'Hector de Saint-Denys Garneau, thesis (Ph. D.) presented to the Faculty of High Learning of Université Laval (PDF).
- La Mémoire du Québec (Online). "Saint-Augustin-de-Desmaures (Municipalité)".
- Montagne, Françoise (1965). Tourouvre et les Juchereau – Un chapitre de l'émigration percheronne au Canada, Contribution No 13. Société canadienne de Généalogie (Québec) / Association Perche-Canada.
- Nos Origines 43705 (Online). "Noël Juchereau, sieur de Châtelet et Deschatelets".
- perche-quebec.com, émigration (Online). "Emigration percheronne vers le Canada".
- perche-quebec.com, frères (Online). "Les frères Juchereau".
- Phares, Ross; Jack Hastings (1999). Cavalier in the Wilderness: The Story of the Explorer and Trader Louis Juchereau de St. Denis. Gretna, Louisiana: Pelican Publishing. p. 58. ISBN 978-0882891279.
- PREFEN Fiche 8860, Notice complémentaire (2005). "Les Juchereau" (PDF).
- Twaites, Reuben Gold, ed. (1898). The Jesuit relations and allied documents: travels and explorations of the Jesuit missionaries in New France, 1610-1791. Burrows Bros. Co. p. 313.
- Vachon, André (1966). "Noël Juchereau des Chatelets". in DCB / DBC
