= Normandel =

- Part of Charencey
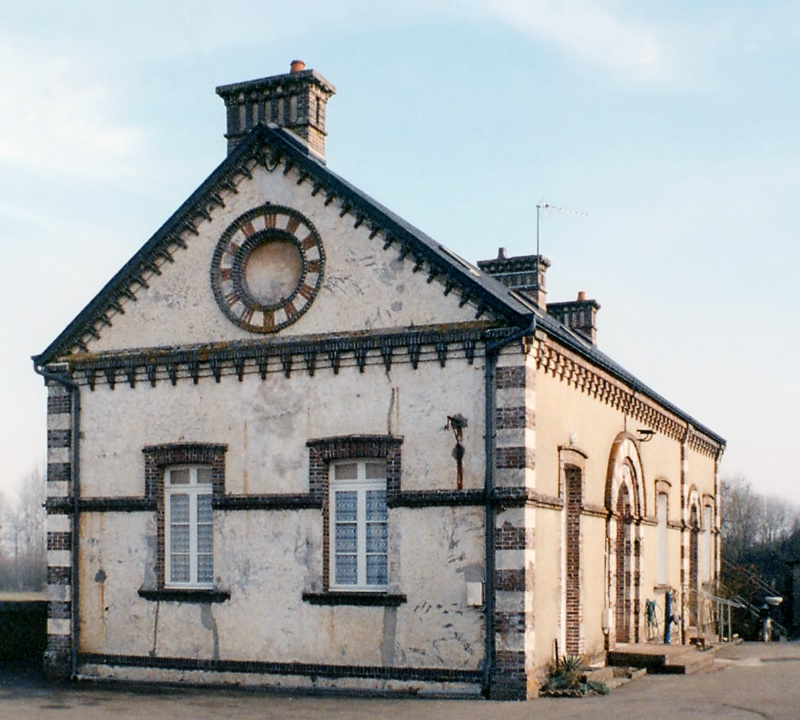
- Building in Normandel
- Location of Normandel
- Location within France Location within Normandy
- Coordinates: 48°38′49″N 0°42′52″E
- Country: France
- Region: Normandy
- Department: Orne
- Arrondissement: Mortagne-au-Perche
- Canton: Tourouvre
- Commune: Charencey
- Area^{1}: 7.43 km^{2} (2.87 sq mi)
- Elevation: 234 m (768 ft)
- Highest elevation: 248 m (814 ft)
- Lowest elevation: 199 m (653 ft)
- Population (2022): 86
  - Density: 12/km^{2} (30/sq mi)
- Time zone: UTC+01:00 (CET)
  - Summer (DST): UTC+02:00 (CEST)
- Postal code: 61190
- ^{1} French Land Register data, which excludes lakes, ponds, glaciers > 1 km^{2} (0.386 sq mi or 247 acres) and river estuaries.

Normandel (French pronunciation: [nɔʁmɑ̃dɛl]) is a former commune in the Orne department in north-western France. On 1 January 2018, it was merged into the new commune of Charencey. It was the birthplace of Jacques Goulet (1615-1688), ancestor of virtually all Goulets in North America.

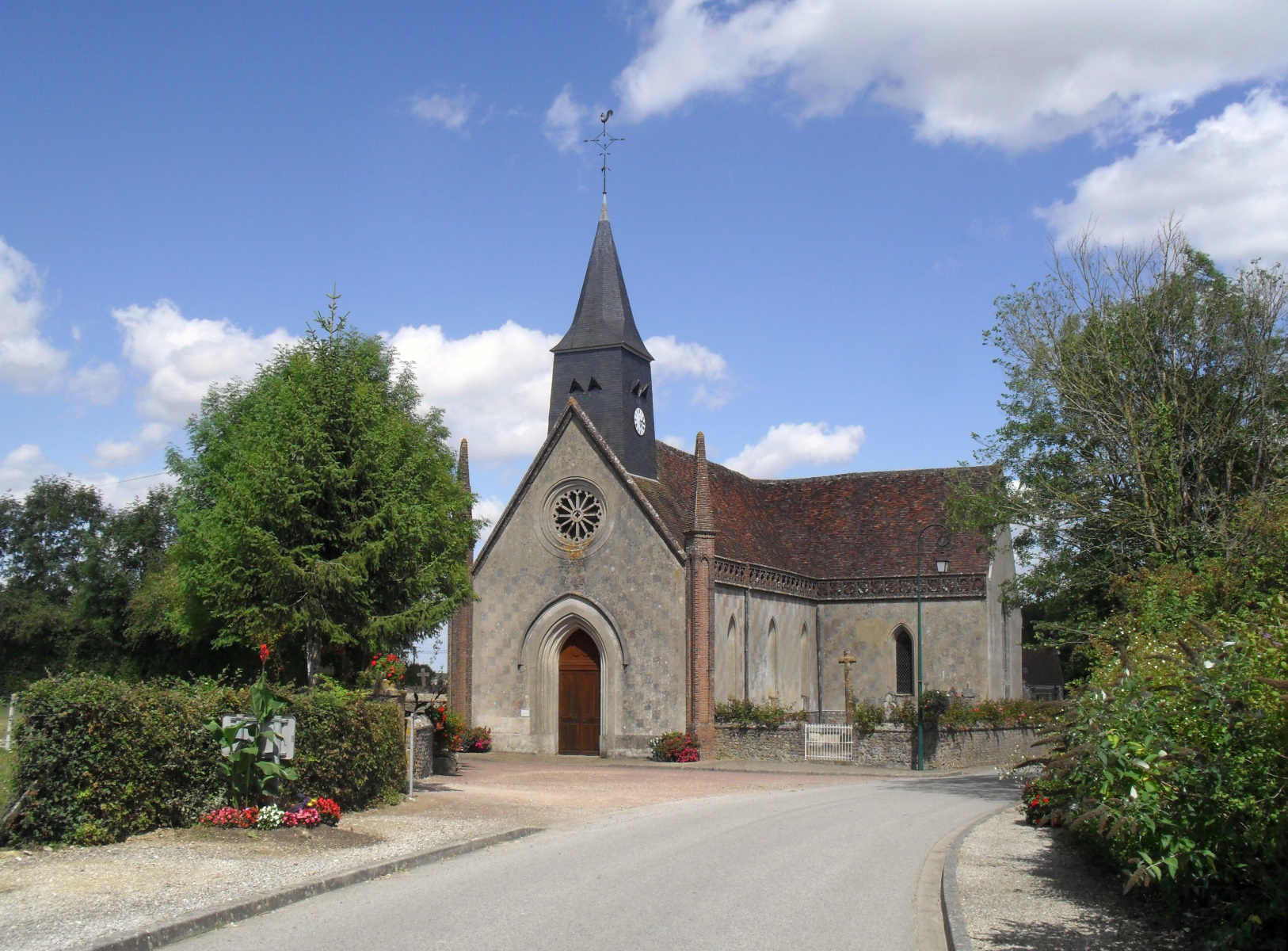
St. Firmin Catholic Church in Normandel. More than 400 years old.

== See also ==
- Communes of the Orne department
