= Champs, Orne =

Champs
- Part of Tourouvre au Perche
- Location of Champs
- Location within France Location within Normandy
- Coordinates: 48°35′04″N 0°33′22″E
- Country: France
- Region: Normandy
- Department: Orne
- Arrondissement: Mortagne-au-Perche
- Canton: Tourouvre
- Commune: Tourouvre au Perche
- Area^{1}: 4.91 km^{2} (1.90 sq mi)
- Elevation: 169 m (554 ft)
- Highest elevation: 275 m (902 ft)
- Lowest elevation: 190 m (620 ft)
- Population (2022): 71
  - Density: 14/km^{2} (37/sq mi)
- Time zone: UTC+01:00 (CET)
  - Summer (DST): UTC+02:00 (CEST)
- Postal code: 61190
- ^{1} French Land Register data, which excludes lakes, ponds, glaciers > 1 km^{2} (0.386 sq mi or 247 acres) and river estuaries.

Champs (French pronunciation: [ʃɑ̃]) is a former commune in the Orne department in north-western France. On 1 January 2016, it was merged into the new commune of Tourouvre au Perche.

== Demographics ==
In 2022, the municipality had 71 inhabitants. Since 2004, census surveys in municipalities with fewer than 10,000 inhabitants have taken place every five years (in 2008, 2013, 2018, etc. for Champs) and the legal municipal population figures for other years are estimates.

== See also ==
- Communes of the Orne department
