= Montmirail, Sarthe =

Montmirail
- Commune
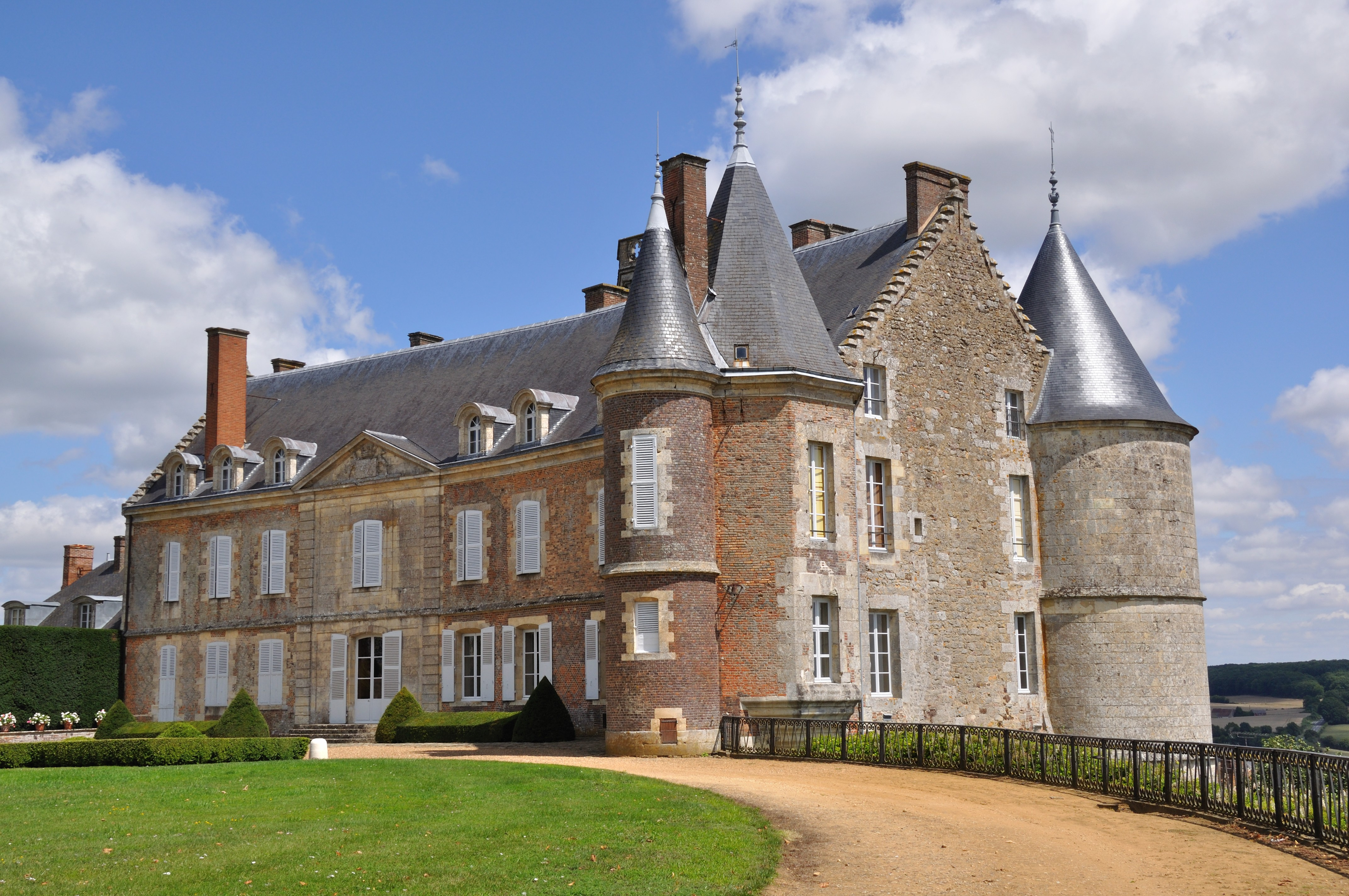
- The château of Montmirail
- Location of Montmirail
- Location within France Location within Pays de la Loire
- Coordinates: 48°06′13″N 0°47′29″E
- Country: France
- Region: Pays de la Loire
- Department: Sarthe
- Arrondissement: Mamers
- Canton: Saint-Calais
- Intercommunality: CC du Perche Emeraude

Government
  - Mayor (2020–2026): Jean Dumur
- Area^{1}: 12.53 km^{2} (4.84 sq mi)
- Highest elevation: 227 m (745 ft)
- Lowest elevation: 122 m (400 ft)
- Population (2023): 366
  - Density: 29.2/km^{2} (75.7/sq mi)
- Time zone: UTC+01:00 (CET)
  - Summer (DST): UTC+02:00 (CEST)
- INSEE/Postal code: 72208 /72320
- ^{1} French Land Register data, which excludes lakes, ponds, glaciers > 1 km^{2} (0.386 sq mi or 247 acres) and river estuaries.

Montmirail (French pronunciation: [mɔ̃miʁaj]) is a commune in the Sarthe department in the region of Pays de la Loire in north-western France.

== See also ==
- Communes of the Sarthe department
- Perche
