= Prépotin =

- Part of Tourouvre au Perche
- Location of Prépotin
- Location within France Location within Normandy
- Coordinates: 48°36′52″N 0°34′42″E
- Country: France
- Region: Normandy
- Department: Orne
- Arrondissement: Mortagne-au-Perche
- Canton: Tourouvre
- Commune: Tourouvre au Perche
- Area^{1}: 10.53 km^{2} (4.07 sq mi)
- Highest elevation: 304 m (997 ft)
- Lowest elevation: 244 m (801 ft)
- Population (2022): 120
  - Density: 11/km^{2} (30/sq mi)
- Demonym: Prépotinois
- Time zone: UTC+01:00 (CET)
  - Summer (DST): UTC+02:00 (CEST)
- Postal code: 61190
- Website: prepotin.fr
- ^{1} French Land Register data, which excludes lakes, ponds, glaciers > 1 km^{2} (0.386 sq mi or 247 acres) and river estuaries.

Prépotin (French pronunciation: [pʁepɔtɛ̃]) is a former commune in the Orne department (region of Normandy) in north-western France. On 1 January 2016, it was merged into the new commune of Tourouvre au Perche. It belongs to the canton of Tourouvre and the arrondissement of Mortagne-au-Perche. Prépotin had 120 inhabitants in 2022. It sits at an altitude of 263 meters.

== See also ==
- Communes of the Orne department
