= Randonnai =

- Part of Tourouvre au Perche
- Location of Randonnai
- Location within France Location within Normandy
- Coordinates: 48°39′03″N 0°40′35″E
- Country: France
- Region: Normandy
- Department: Orne
- Arrondissement: Mortagne-au-Perche
- Canton: Tourouvre
- Commune: Tourouvre au Perche
- Area^{1}: 11.22 km^{2} (4.33 sq mi)
- Elevation: 241 m (791 ft)
- Highest elevation: 292 m (958 ft)
- Lowest elevation: 219 m (719 ft)
- Population (2022): 695
  - Density: 61.9/km^{2} (160/sq mi)
- Demonym: Randonéens
- Time zone: UTC+01:00 (CET)
  - Summer (DST): UTC+02:00 (CEST)
- Postal code: 61190
- ^{1} French Land Register data, which excludes lakes, ponds, glaciers > 1 km^{2} (0.386 sq mi or 247 acres) and river estuaries.

Randonnai (French pronunciation: [ʁɑ̃dɔnɛ]) is a former commune in the Orne department in north-western France. On 1 January 2016, it was merged into the new commune of Tourouvre au Perche.

== Heraldry ==
Arms of Randonnai	The arms of Randonnai are blazoned : Quarterly 1: Azure semy of mullets argent, 2 annulets interlaced Or; 2: Argent, 3 chevrons gules; 3: Argent, a maple leaf vert; 4: Vert, a stag Or.

== See also ==
- Communes of the Orne department
