= Tourouvre au Perche =

- Commune
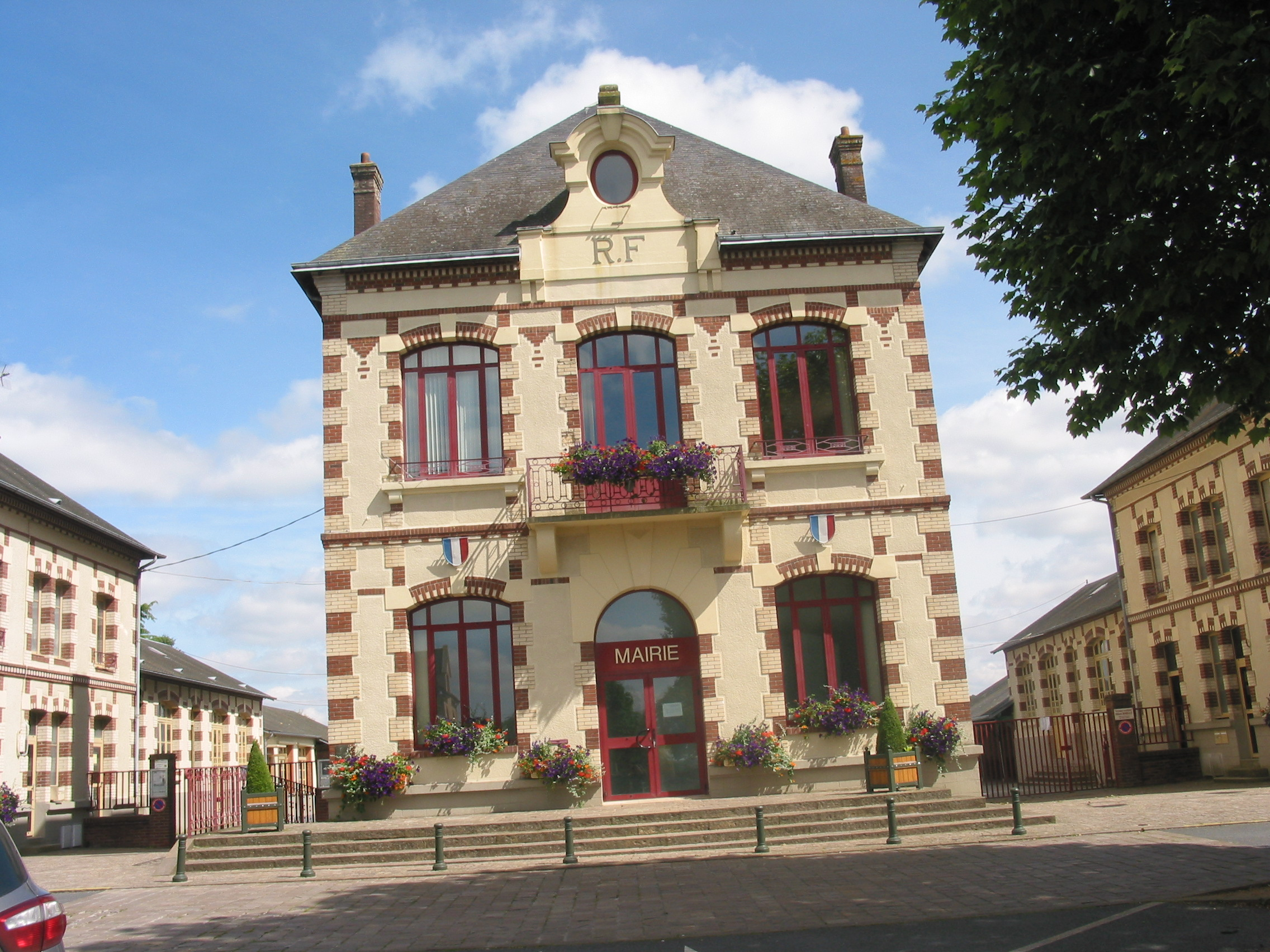
- The town hall in Tourouvre au Perche
- Location of Tourouvre au Perche
- Location within France Location within Normandy
- Coordinates: 48°35′24″N 0°39′07″E
- Country: France
- Region: Normandy
- Department: Orne
- Arrondissement: Mortagne-au-Perche
- Canton: Tourouvre au Perche
- Intercommunality: CC Hauts Perche

Government
  - Mayor (2020–2026): Franck Poirier
- Area^{1}: 93.76 km^{2} (36.20 sq mi)
- Population (2023): 2,955
  - Density: 31.52/km^{2} (81.63/sq mi)
- Time zone: UTC+01:00 (CET)
  - Summer (DST): UTC+02:00 (CEST)
- INSEE/Postal code: 61491 /61190
- ^{1} French Land Register data, which excludes lakes, ponds, glaciers > 1 km^{2} (0.386 sq mi or 247 acres) and river estuaries.

Tourouvre au Perche (French pronunciation: [tuʁuvʁ o pɛʁʃ]) is a commune in the department of Orne, northwestern France. The municipality was established on 1 January 2016 by merger of the former communes of Autheuil, Bivilliers, Bresolettes, Bubertré, Champs, Lignerolles, La Poterie-au-Perche, Prépotin, Randonnai and Tourouvre (the seat).

The commune is listed as a Village étape.

== Geography ==
Tourouvre au Perche along with the communes of Feings, Longny les Villages, Le Mage, Moutiers-au-Perche and Charencey shares part of the Forets, etangs et tourbieres du Haut-Perche a Natura 2000 conservation site. The site measures 3670 hectares and is home to fifteen species protected Flora and Fauna.

In addition the Commune along with another 70 communes shares part of a 47,681 hectare, Natura 2000 conservation area, called the Forêts et étangs du Perche.

The source of the river Avre is within this commune. In addition three more rivers La Vilette, L'Itonne and La Commeauche flow through the commune. There is also two streams flowing through the commune, the Ruisseau Saint-Maurice and the Ruisseau de la Motte.

== Population ==
Population data refer to the area corresponding with the commune as of January 2025.

Historical population
Year	Pop.	±% p.a.
1968	3,602	—
1975	4,020	+1.58%
1982	3,768	−0.92%
1990	3,377	−1.36%
1999	3,311	−0.22%
2007	3,361	+0.19%
2012	3,339	−0.13%
2017	3,127	−1.30%
2023	2,955	−0.94%
Source: INSEE

== Points of interest ==
- Les Muséales de Tourouvre: this site houses two museums - The Museum of French Emigration to Canada and The Museum of Commerce and Brands
- Réserve Naturelle Régionale de la Clairière Forestière de Bresolettes: a 780 hectare local nature reserve.

=== Wattway ===
On 22 December 2016, the world's first solar panel road - the Wattway on the RD5 road - was inaugurated. It was covered with 2,800 square meters of electricity-generating panels. The panels are covered with a resin containing fine sheets of silicon, making them tough enough to withstand all traffic. The project cost €5 million. On 22 July 2019 it was reported to be a colossal failure.

=== National Heritage sites ===
The Commune has a total of 5 buildings and areas listed as a Monument historique.

- Tourouvre Church - 15th century church, added as a monument in 1991.
- Bivilliers Church - 12th century church, added as a monument in 2006.
- Saint-Evroult Church - 11th century church, added as a monument in 1965. According to legend the church was built after Hugh the Great had pillaged the Abbey of Saint-Evroul in 944, when his jesters started mocking the holy objects they were struck by lightning, and the church built on the location of this event.
- Notre-Dame Church - built in the Middle Ages, added as a monument in 1875.
- Bellegarde Manor - a 15th century manor house, added as a monument in 1978.
- La Gagnonniere - historical site that was once an inn run by Barnabé Gagnon. His 3 grandsons were recruited to help build New France, otherwise known as Quebec. Barnabé is the first recorded Gagnon ancestor.

== See also ==
- Communes of the Orne department
