= Bivilliers =

- Part of Tourouvre au Perche
- Location of Bivilliers
- Location within France Location within Normandy
- Coordinates: 48°34′50″N 0°37′08″E
- Country: France
- Region: Normandy
- Department: Orne
- Arrondissement: Mortagne-au-Perche
- Canton: Tourouvre
- Commune: Tourouvre au Perche
- Area^{1}: 4.15 km^{2} (1.60 sq mi)
- Elevation: 211 m (692 ft)
- Highest elevation: 257 m (843 ft)
- Lowest elevation: 202 m (663 ft)
- Population (2023): 60
  - Density: 14/km^{2} (37/sq mi)
- Time zone: UTC+01:00 (CET)
  - Summer (DST): UTC+02:00 (CEST)
- Postal code: 61190
- ^{1} French Land Register data, which excludes lakes, ponds, glaciers > 1 km^{2} (0.386 sq mi or 247 acres) and river estuaries.

Bivilliers (French pronunciation: [bivilje]) is a former commune in the Orne department in northwestern France. On 1 January 2016, it was merged into the new commune of Tourouvre au Perche.

== See also ==
- Communes of the Orne department
