= L'Hôme-Chamondot =

- Commune
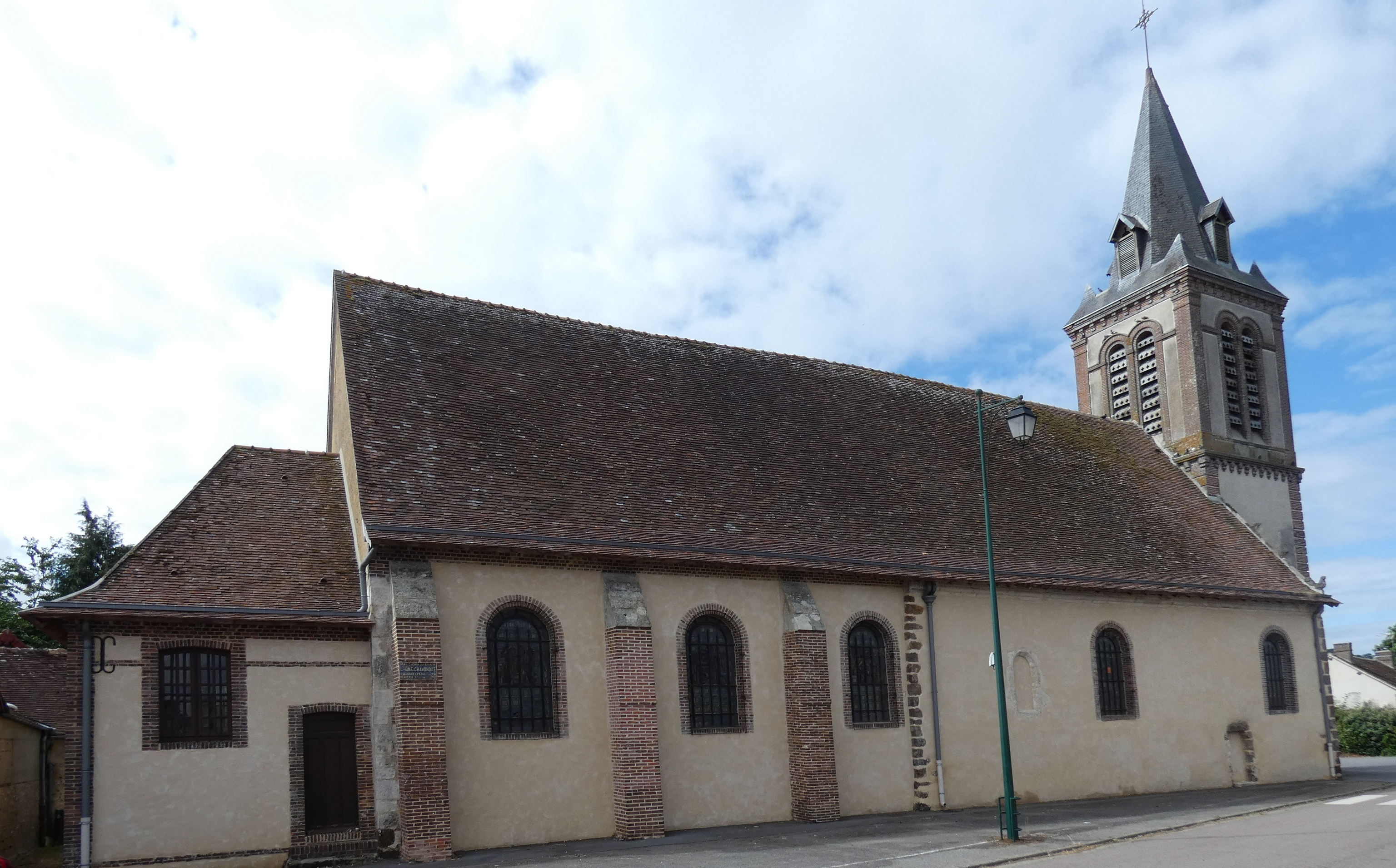
- Location of L'Hôme-Chamondot
- Location within France Location within Normandy
- Coordinates: 48°35′24″N 0°42′57″E
- Country: France
- Region: Normandy
- Department: Orne
- Arrondissement: Mortagne-au-Perche
- Canton: Tourouvre au Perche
- Intercommunality: Hauts du Perche

Government
  - Mayor (2020–2026): Patrice Michel-Flandin
- Area^{1}: 15.92 km^{2} (6.15 sq mi)
- Elevation: 248 m (814 ft)
- Highest elevation: 268 m (879 ft)
- Lowest elevation: 205 m (673 ft)
- Population (2023): 266
  - Density: 16.7/km^{2} (43.3/sq mi)
- Time zone: UTC+01:00 (CET)
  - Summer (DST): UTC+02:00 (CEST)
- INSEE/Postal code: 61206 /61290
- ^{1} French Land Register data, which excludes lakes, ponds, glaciers > 1 km^{2} (0.386 sq mi or 247 acres) and river estuaries.

L'Hôme-Chamondot (French pronunciation: [lom ʃamɔ̃do]) is a commune in the Orne department in north-western France.

In 1812 the former commune Brotz was merged into L'Hôme-Chamondot.

== Geography ==
L'Hôme-Chamondot is made up of the following collection of villages and hamlets, Les Chauffetières, Les Grands Herbages, La Cellerie, Le Mont Huchet, La Motte, L'Onglée and L'Hôme-Chamondot.

The Commune along with another 70 communes shares part of a 47,681 hectare, Natura 2000 conservation area, called the Forêts et étangs du Perche.

A stream, Ruisseau de Charencey, flows through the commune.

== Points of interest ==
=== National heritage sites ===
The Commune has two buildings and areas listed as a Monument historique.

- Chauffetières brickworks originally built in 1760 and still in use today making hand made bricks, this brickwork was registered as a monument in 1995.
- Gannes castle ruins of a castle from the Middle Ages, registered as a Monument historique in 1933.

== See also ==
- Communes of the Orne department
