= Lignerolles, Orne =

Lignerolles
- Part of Tourouvre au Perche
- Location of Lignerolles
- Location within France Location within Normandy
- Coordinates: 48°35′30″N 0°35′02″E
- Country: France
- Region: Normandy
- Department: Orne
- Arrondissement: Mortagne-au-Perche
- Canton: Tourouvre
- Commune: Tourouvre au Perche
- Area^{1}: 5.28 km^{2} (2.04 sq mi)
- Elevation: 260 m (850 ft)
- Highest elevation: 311 m (1,020 ft)
- Lowest elevation: 215 m (705 ft)
- Population (2022): 157
  - Density: 29.7/km^{2} (77.0/sq mi)
- Time zone: UTC+01:00 (CET)
  - Summer (DST): UTC+02:00 (CEST)
- Postal code: 61190
- ^{1} French Land Register data, which excludes lakes, ponds, glaciers > 1 km^{2} (0.386 sq mi or 247 acres) and river estuaries.

Lignerolles (French pronunciation: [liɲʁɔl]) is a former commune in the Orne department in north-western France. On 1 January 2016, it was merged into the new commune of Tourouvre au Perche.

== See also ==
- Communes of the Orne department
