= Tourouvre =

Commune in Orne, France

- Part of Tourouvre au Perche
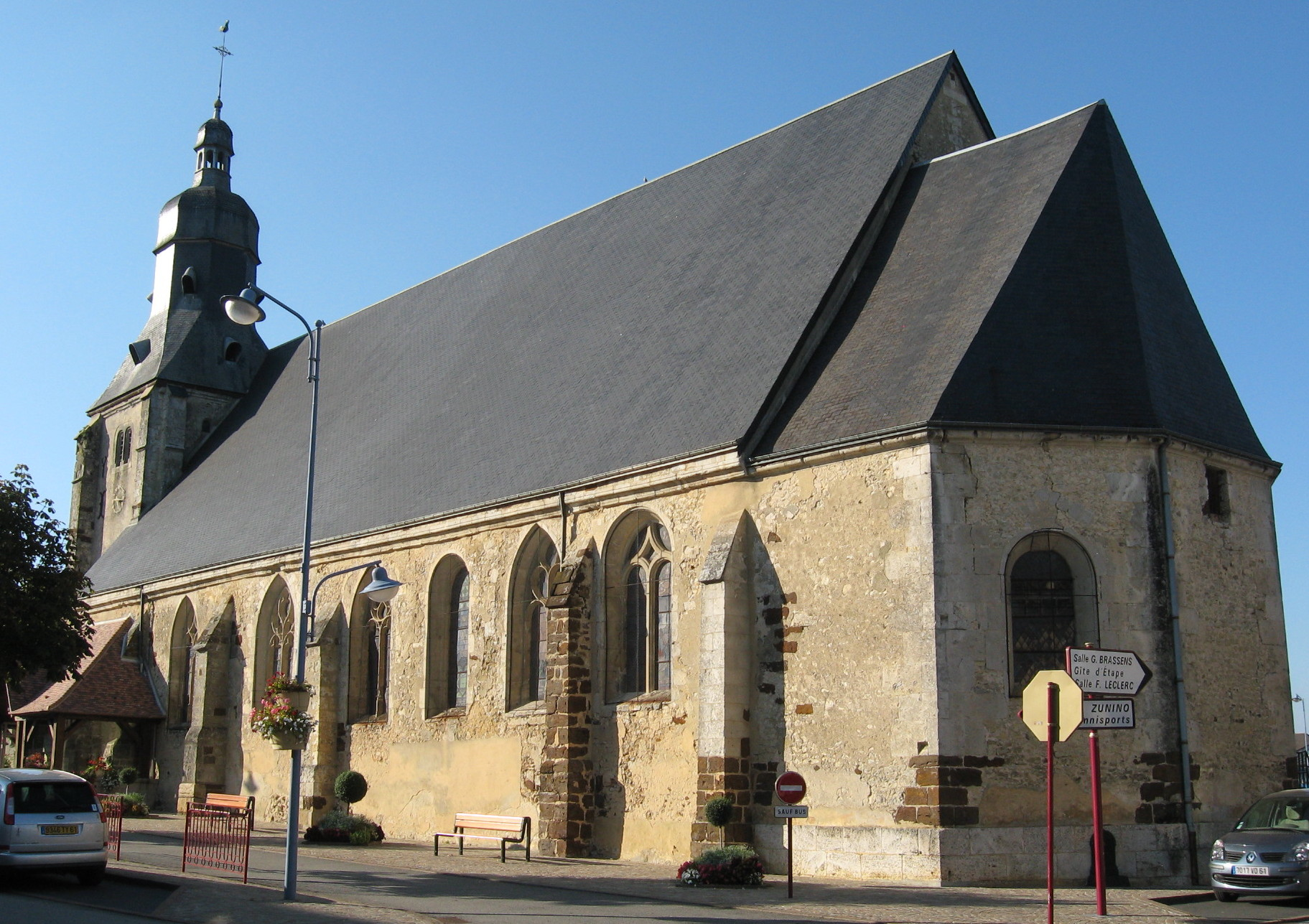
- Saint-Aubin church
- Location of Tourouvre
- Location within France Location within Normandy
- Coordinates: 48°35′28″N 0°39′08″E
- Country: France
- Region: Normandy
- Department: Orne
- Arrondissement: Mortagne-au-Perche
- Canton: Tourouvre (chef-lieu)
- Commune: Tourouvre au Perche
- Area^{1}: 24.01 km^{2} (9.27 sq mi)
- Elevation: 236 m (774 ft)
- Highest elevation: 304 m (997 ft)
- Lowest elevation: 180 m (590 ft)
- Population (2022): 1,490
  - Density: 62.1/km^{2} (161/sq mi)
- Time zone: UTC+01:00 (CET)
  - Summer (DST): UTC+02:00 (CEST)
- Postal code: 61190
- ^{1} French Land Register data, which excludes lakes, ponds, glaciers > 1 km^{2} (0.386 sq mi or 247 acres) and river estuaries.

Tourouvre (French pronunciation: [tuʁuvʁ]) is a former commune in the Orne department in north-western France. On 1 January 2016, it was merged into the new commune of Tourouvre au Perche.

The first photovoltaic road in the world was under construction in Tourouvre in November–December 2016. It was built by Société Nouvelle Aeracem (SNA), and dedicated by the French Minister of Ecology, Ségolène Royal on 25 October 2016. In 2019, Le Monde declared the experiment a failure.

== Heraldry ==
Arms of Tourouvre	The arms of Tourouvre are blazoned : Per fess, azure and Or, 3 ox heads Or and 3 maple leaves vert.

== See also ==
- Communes of the Orne department
- Perche
