= Perche =

Former province of France

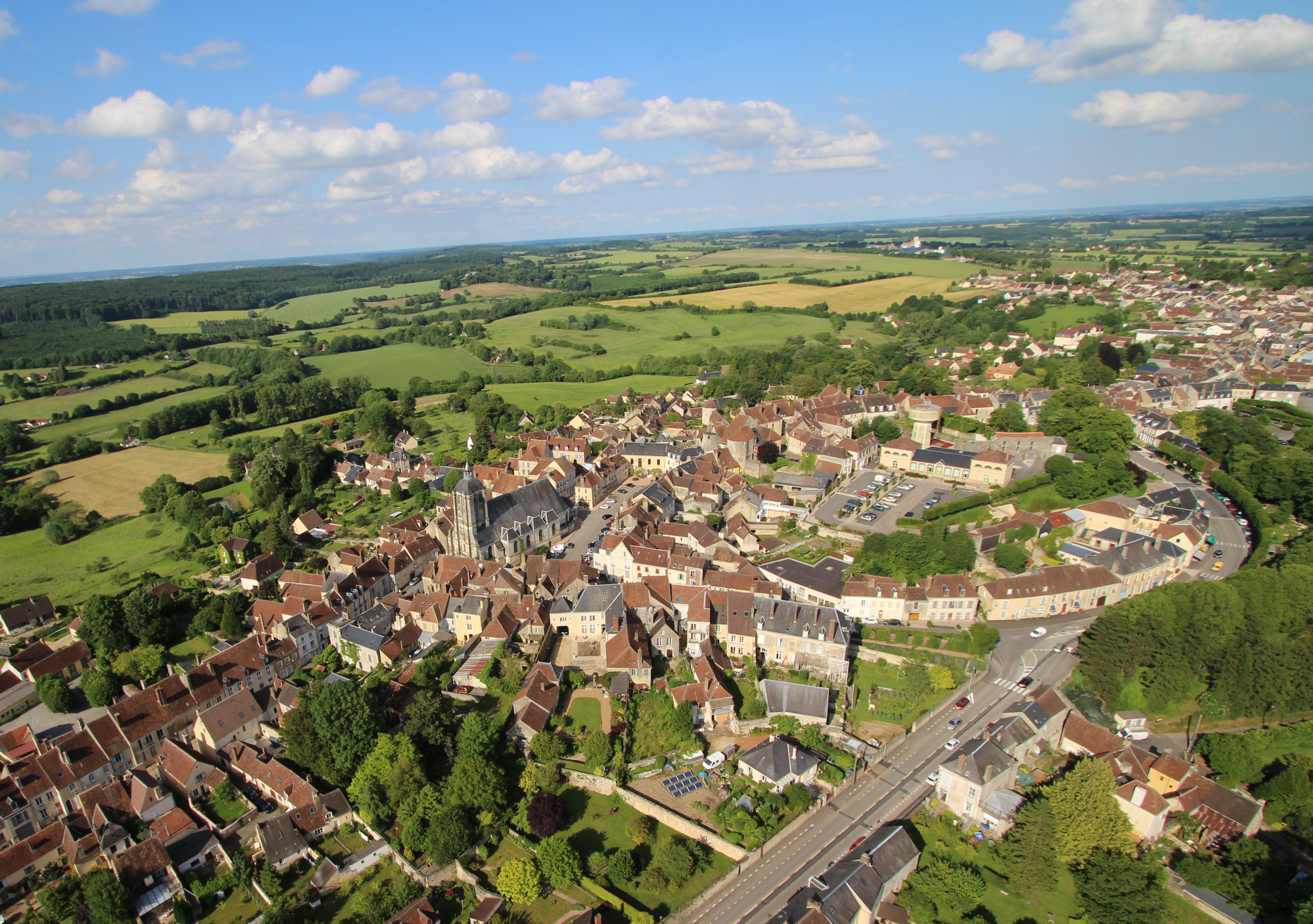
Bellême, one of Perche's capitals

Location of Perche in France

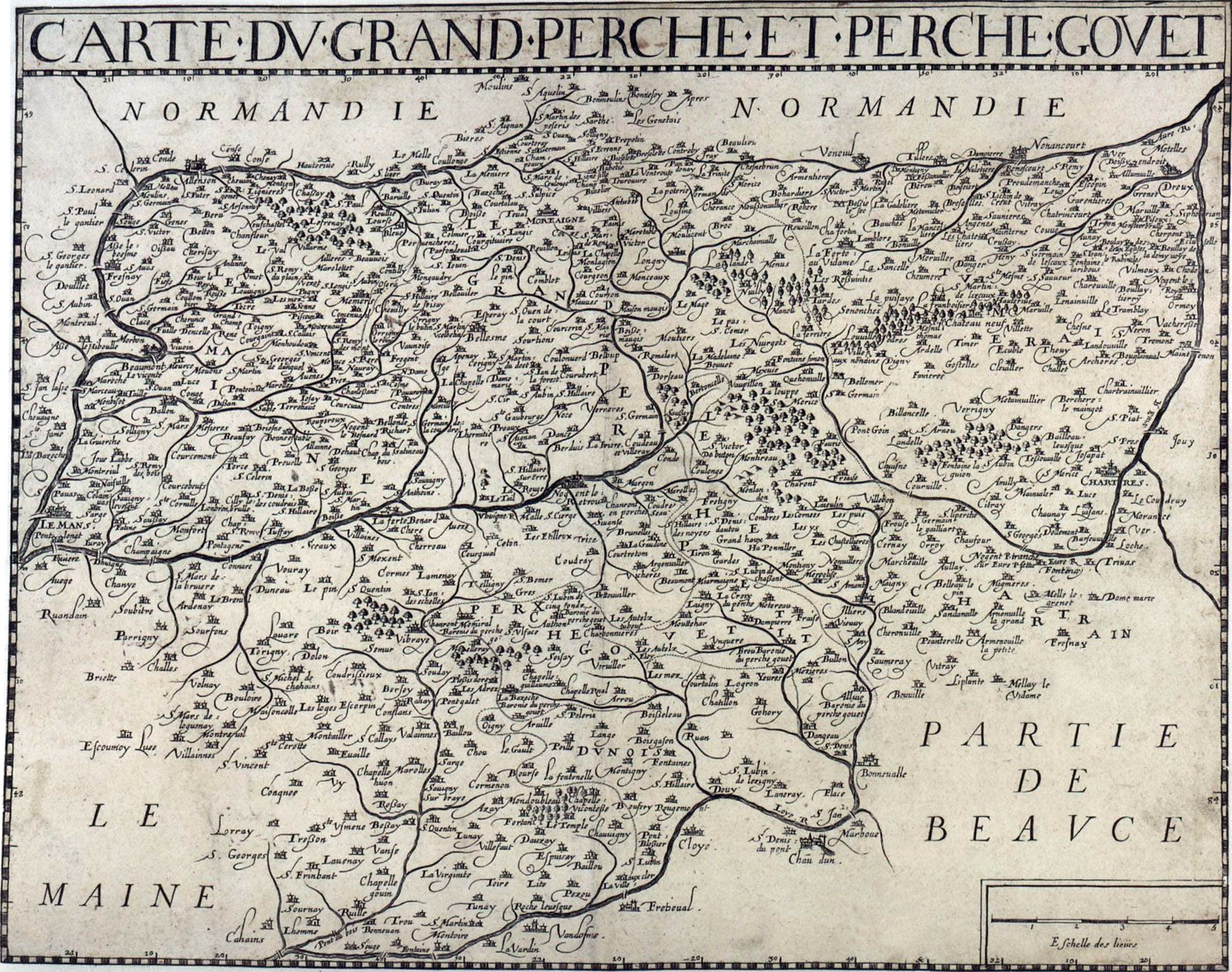
17th-century map of Grand Perche and Perche Gouet

Perche (French pronunciation: [pɛʁʃ]) (French: le Perche) is a former province of France, known historically for its forests and, for the past two centuries, for the Percheron draft horse breed. Until the French Revolution, Perche was bounded by four ancient territories of northwestern France: the provinces of Maine, Normandy, and Orléanais, and the region of Beauce. (Note: Orléanais and Beauce were collectively known as Pays Chartrain) Afterwards it was absorbed into the present-day departments of Orne and Eure-et-Loir, with small parts in the neighboring departments of Eure, Loir-et-Cher, and Sarthe.

== Toponymy ==
Perche is known by the following ancient Latin and French toponymic designations: saltus Particus, silva Perticus before the 6th century, pagus quem Pert[ic]ensem vocant and pagus pertensis in the 6th century, pagus Perticus no date and c. 815, Particus saltus in the 11th century, silva Perticus in 1045, [le] Perche in 1160–1174 and in 1308, Perche in 1238, foresta de Pertico in 1246, where the names starting by Pert or Part denote Perche, (Note: According Auguste Longnon 1878 : Le nom latin du Perche est Perticus. Auguste Longnon (1878). Géographie de la Gaule au VI^{e} siècle, Paris (corrected to Pert[ic]ensis). p. 155) the terms silva and foresta mean forest, (Note: According to René Musset : "Le Perche est mentionné pour la première fois au VI^{e} siècle, par Grégoise de Tours, sous le non de pagus pertensis (pert[ic]ensis); à partir de ce moment, il est souvent question dans les textes du Perche, appelé tantôt pagus perticus, tantôt silva pertica. Il semble bien, sans qu’on puisse l’affirmer avec une entière certitude, que le mot de Perche soit étymologiquement un vieux nom de forêt. Il est hors de tout doute que l’expression de pagus perticus désigne une région naturelle, non une circonscription administrative : le Perche ne deviendra tel que dans la seconde moitié du XI^{e} siècle. Le Perche est donc un pays, et ce pays est une silva, une forêt." René Musset (1919) "Le Perche - Nom de pays". Annales de géographie. p. 351) Saltus designates a wooded mountainous region, frontier, wildlife refuge, (Note: According to Centre Généalogique de l'Orne et du Perche - De la préhistoire aux invasions Normandes citing Dict. latin-français de Riemann et Goelzer : « Le sens précis de saltus est "région montueuse et boisée... retraite de bêtes fauves" ») (Note: According to Sarah Fourcade citing Pierre Toubert in Frontière et frontières : un objet historique, p. 14 : « . . . la frontière constitue une zone de développement. Certes, avant d’être mise en valeur et de devenir rentable, la frontière n’est qu’un ‘’saltus’’, une zone où peut s’observer « le phénomène inverse de désertification frontière », avec cette image tenace jusqu'au XI^{e} siècle. . . », Sarah Fourcade (2018). "Frontière et marche, société et noblesse de frontière en péninsule Ibérique") pagus means country, and silva pertica refers to a tall-treed forest. (Note: According to Ville de Québec, toponymie, Perche : "Au Moyen Âge, la forêt recouvre presque entièrement le territoire du Perche, comme le dénote son nom originel : Sylva pertica, du latin pertica, « perche » ou « grand arbre ».")

A hypothesis put forth by the linguist Guy Villette based on the name Perche having initially designated the forest region, and not the province, would have Perche represent the pre-Celtic name of Indo-European origin *perkʷ-ik-ā (forest) with long trees », dissimilated into *pertika, and transmitted as such in the Gallic language, even though the initial p- was foreign to this language. The indo-european radical *perkʷu-, "large tree: oak, pine, fir, beech . . ." is also the origin of the Latin word quercus "oak" and the common Germanic word *furhu-, source of the English and German words fir and Föhre (pine family), respectively.

Until about the 11th or 12th century, such terms as pagus Perticus or pagus Pertecensis used in connection with Perche's ancient forest are accordingly understood to refer to a frontier region without precise geographical limits and thus not to a clearly defined political or administrative territory.

== Geography ==
Limits of pre-Revolutionary Perche province with overlay of current arrondissements and departments

Before the French Revolution, Perche was bounded by the following ancient provinces: Normandy to the north and west, Maine to the west, Beauce to the east and Orléanais to the south.

Perche is dominated by four topographical-featured arcs:

- An outer arc marked by the high edge of a flat high plateau to the west and south of the Perche's eastern and northern limits
- An inner arc, concentric to the high plateau edge arc, defined by the Huisne River, a tributary of the Sarthe River, situated in Perche's irregular lowlands.
- Forest arcs in les collines du Perche (the Perche hills) on either side of the Huisne, consisting of a main forest arc off the Huisne's left bank stretching from Moulins-la-Marche to Montmirail and a secondary forest arc off the Huisne's right bank from Pervenchères to Le Thiel.

Within the Huisne watershed lie the three unofficial Perche capitals: Nogent-le-Rotrou (economic capital), Mortagne-au-Perche (administrative capital) and Bellême (historical capital).

The Perche hills (Note: Collines du Perche) are the source of numerous small tributaries of the Seine River watershed via the Eure, Avre, Iton and Risle rivers and the Loire River watershed via the Huisne, Loir and Sarthe rivers.

=== Perche's principal towns ===
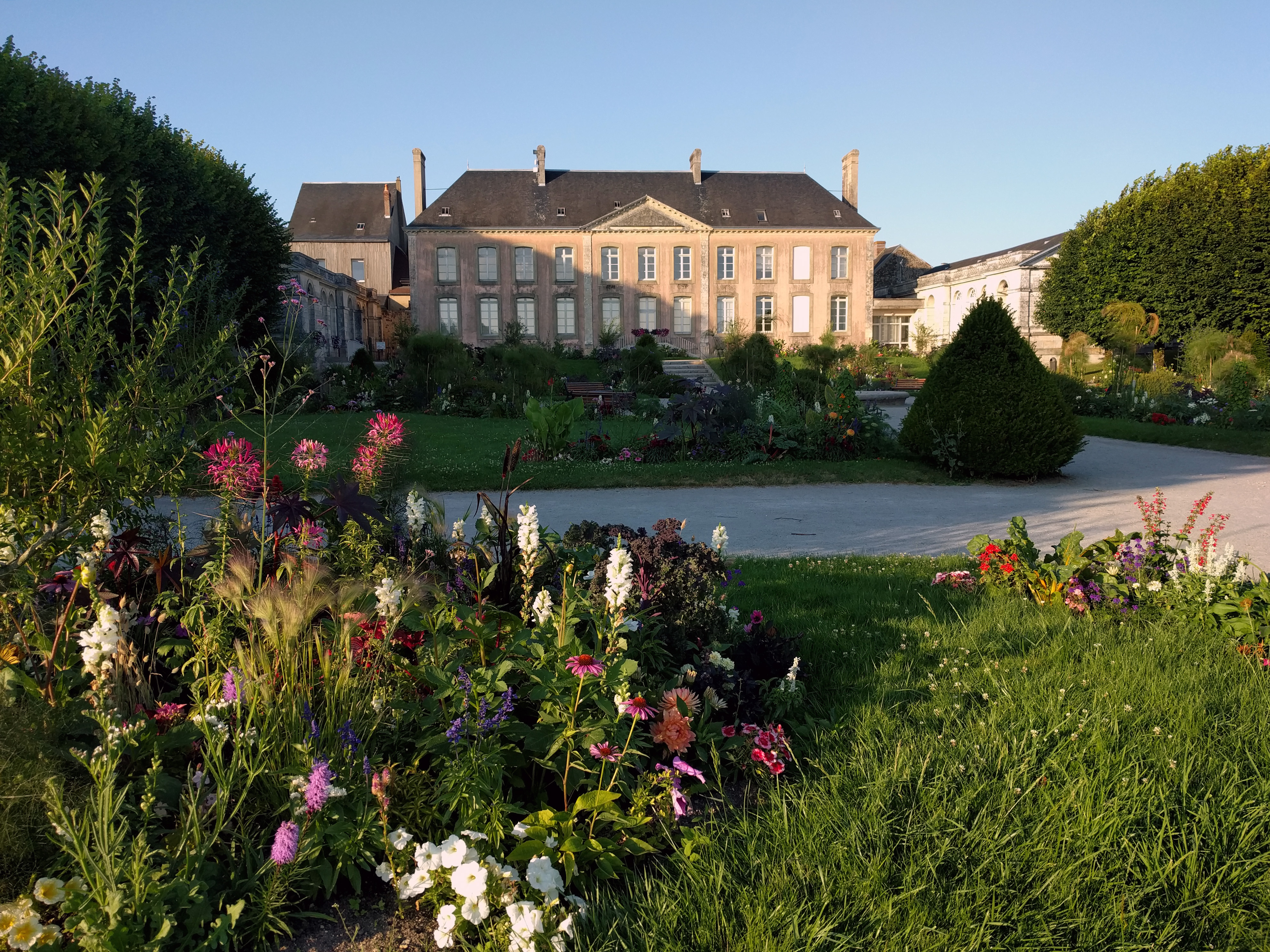
Town hall in Mortagne-au-Perche (2016)

The following table lists the principal towns in Perche province along with the distance of any given town to Condé-sur-Huisne, situated near Perche's geographic center:

	km		km		km		km		km
Arrou	48	Ceton	23	La Ferté-Vidame	29	Luigny	31	Senonches	29
Authon-du-Perche	29	Chateauneuf-en-Thymerais	40	La Loupe	18	Montmirail	41	Thiron-Gardais	15
Bellême	27	Condé-sur-Huisne	~0	Le Gault-du-Perche	43	Mortagne-au-Perche	31	Tourouvre	44
Brezolles	45	Digny	32	Longny-au-Perche	22	Nogent-le-Rotrou	8	Verneuil-sur-Avre	

=== Peripheral towns ===
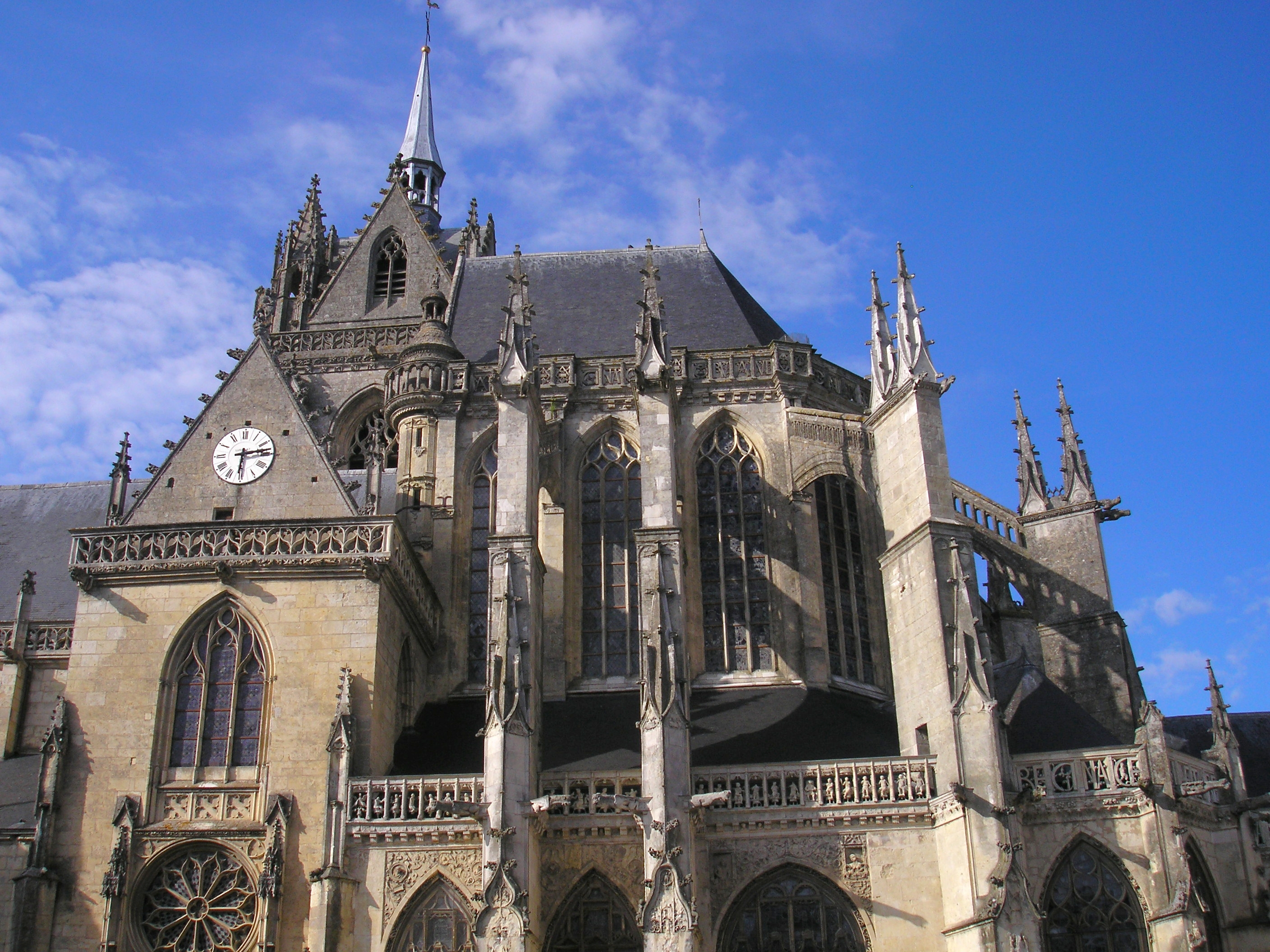
Church of Notre-Dame des Marais in La Ferté-Bernard

Nearby towns in the four ancient provinces along the periphery of Perche province include (starting from the north, clockwise): L'Aigle, Dreux, Chartres, Châteaudun, Le Mans, Mamers, Alençon and Sées.

== Economy ==
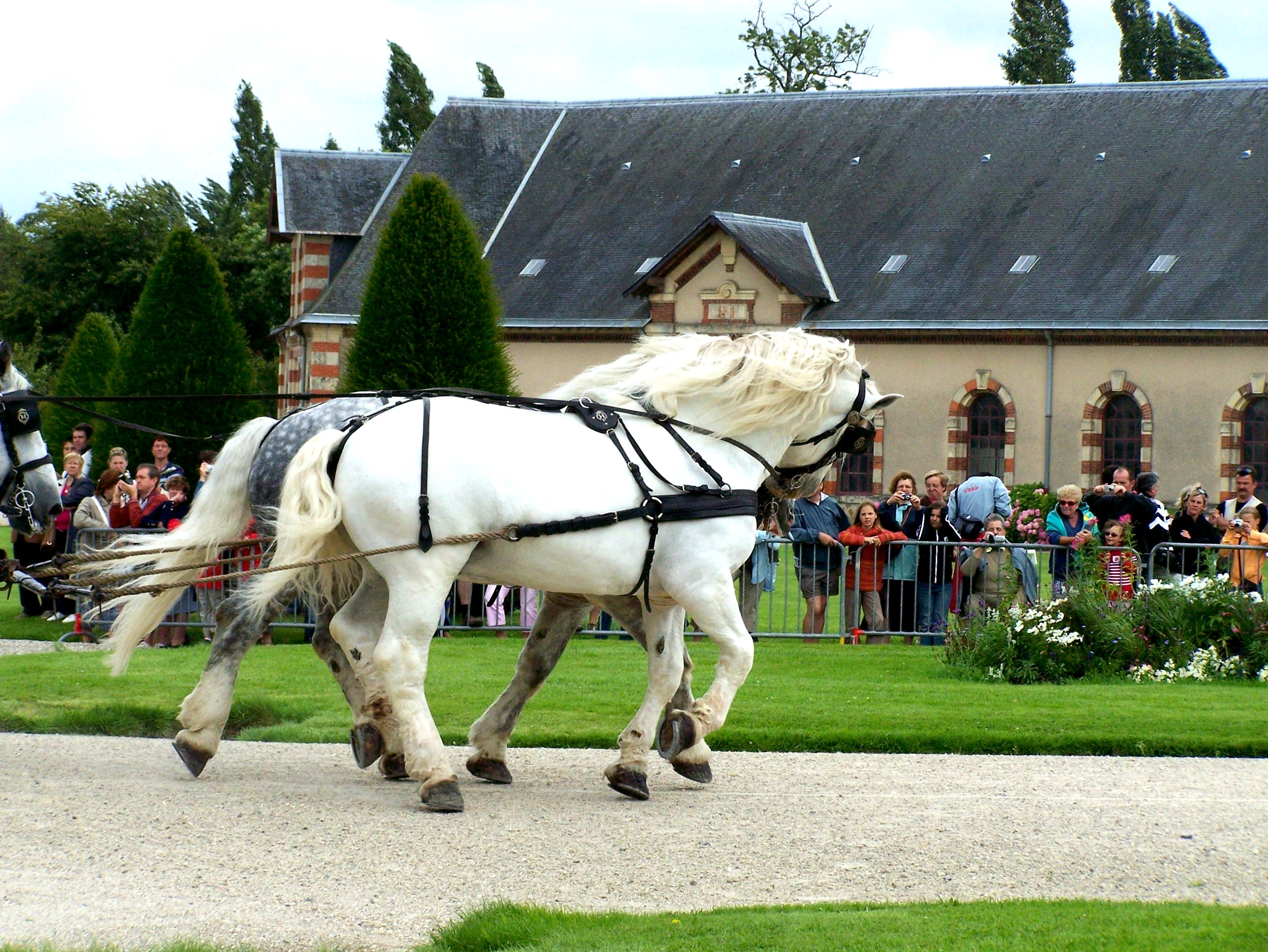
Four-in-hand team of Percheron (2007)

Agriculture and tourism constitute the economic focus of Perche's natural region, the largest parts of which are located within the departments of Orne and Eure-et-Loir, in the regions of Normandy and Centre-Val de Loire, respectively.

The Percheron breed of draft horses originated in Perche's Huisne river valley and is identified throughout the world as the Perche's most well known symbol. Apples (for hard cider) and pears are grown throughout the Perche territory.

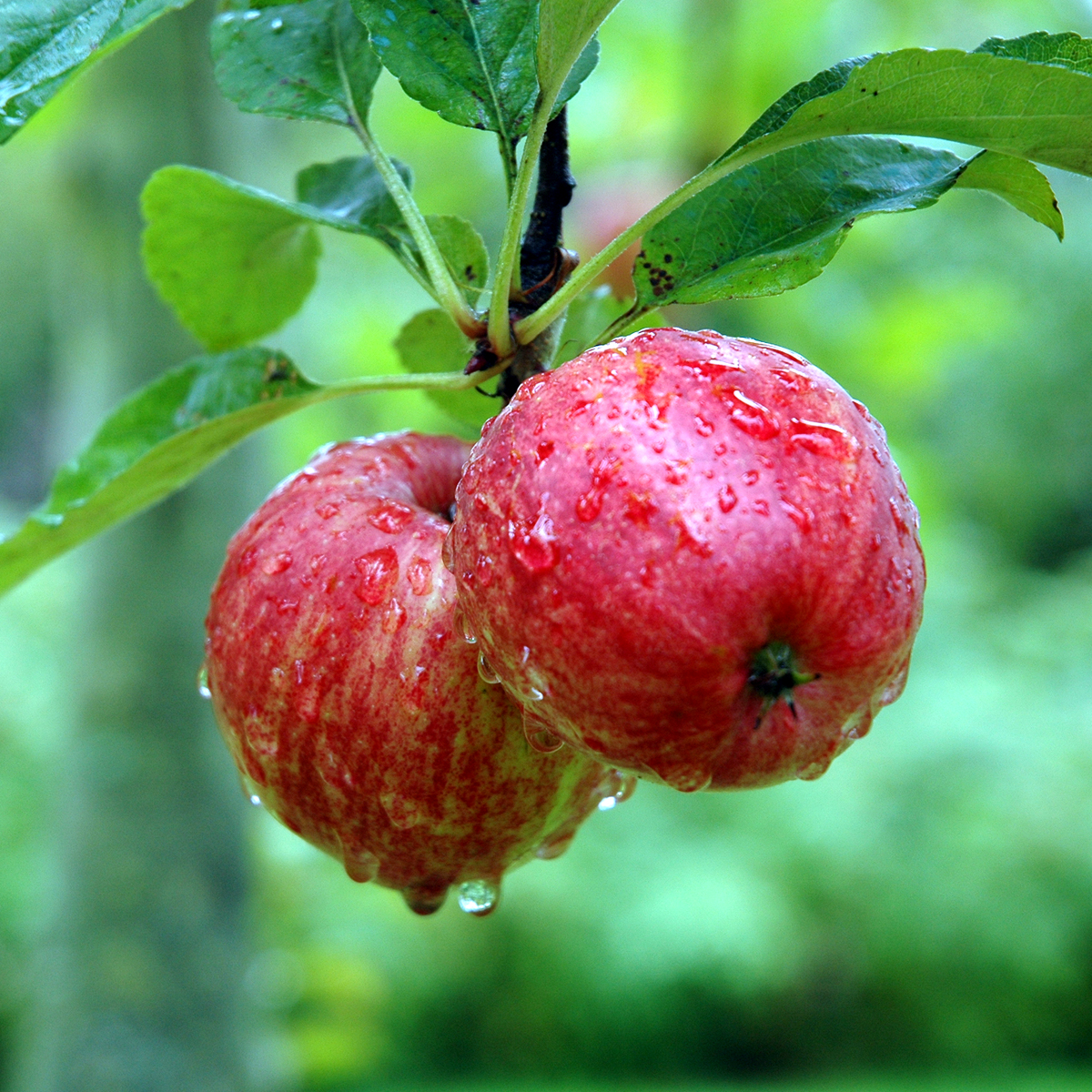
Calvados apples

== History ==
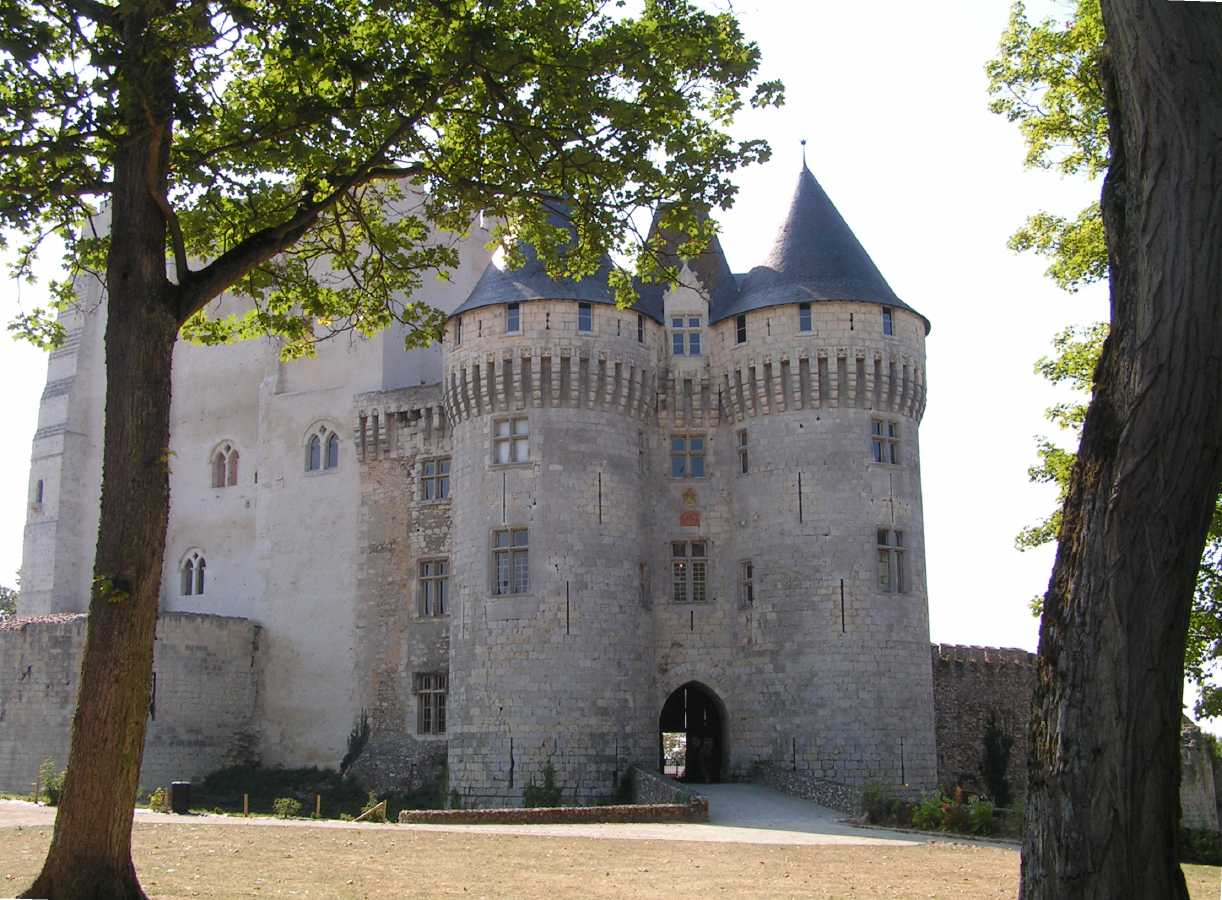
Château Saint-Jean, Nogent-le-Rotrou

=== Prehistory ===
Perche's prehistory is manifested by megaliths (dolmens, menhirs) and prehistoric tools of flint, bronze, and iron.

=== Middle Ages ===
Perche was essentially a region between other regions:

". . . the Perche was not based on an existing administratative unit, such as its neighbors, the counties of Maine and Chartres, nor was it coterminous with an ecclesiastical jurisdiction. It grew up at the margins of several larger units, and there was no major population focus nor great religious centre such as a cathedral or ancient abbey within it. It owed its existence to the ambition and energy of successive members of a lineage of warrior elite."

The Romans found possession of the Perche forests was necessary for the conquest of the vast Armorique and Normandy territories extending from the Loire estuary off the Atlantic coast to Dieppe off the English Channel.

Until the Viking or Norman invasions in the 9th century, Perche was a relatively remote area bounded on all sides by the following Gaul-Roman territories and Celtic peoples: to the east and south the Carnutes people in Chartrain territory based in Chartres; to the northeast the Aulerques Eburoviques people in Évreux territory based in Évreux; to the southwest the Aulerques Cénomans people in Maine territory based in Le Mans; and to the northwest the Hyesmois (Essuins) people in Exmes territory based in Séez. These territories eventually became first Roman civitates, to then become the dioceses of Chartres, Evreux, Le Mans and Séez. that did not change significantly in terms of geographical limits until the Revolution. Thus Perche has traditionally been shared between three of these four dioceses as follows:

- Parishes in northwest Perche such as in the town of Mortagne have been part of Séez diocese;
- Parishes in eastern Perche such as in the towns of Tourouvre and Nogent-le-Rotrou have been part of Chartres diocese;
- Parishes in southwest Perche such as in the town of Bellême have been part of Le Mans diocese.
- The Commune of Thiron-Gardais was occupied by the mother abbey of the Tironensian Order of monks who founded the order in 1106.

In the Middle Ages, the County of Perche was controlled by an independent line of counts. By the 12th century, two large families contended for control of the Perche region: the Talvas of Bellême family and the Rotrou family of Nogent-le-Rotrou. In 1114, Rotrou III annexed Bellême. In 1226, Count Geoffroy V would have been a leader of the Fourth Crusade had he not died before its departure to the Near East. This end of the Rotrou dynasty led to the region's annexation to the Crown of France (by inheritance). At this time, the crown divided part of the region to create the county of Alençon. After 1325, both counties were generally held by a member or members of a cadet branch of the House of Valois. During the Hundred Years War, partisans of England plundered Perche, destroyed its nobility, and burned many castles and abbeys. In 1449, free from English domination, Perche began reconstruction. Upon the death of Alençon's last duke (1525), rule returned to and remained under the French crown, and was granted only sporadically thereafter.

=== Modern times ===
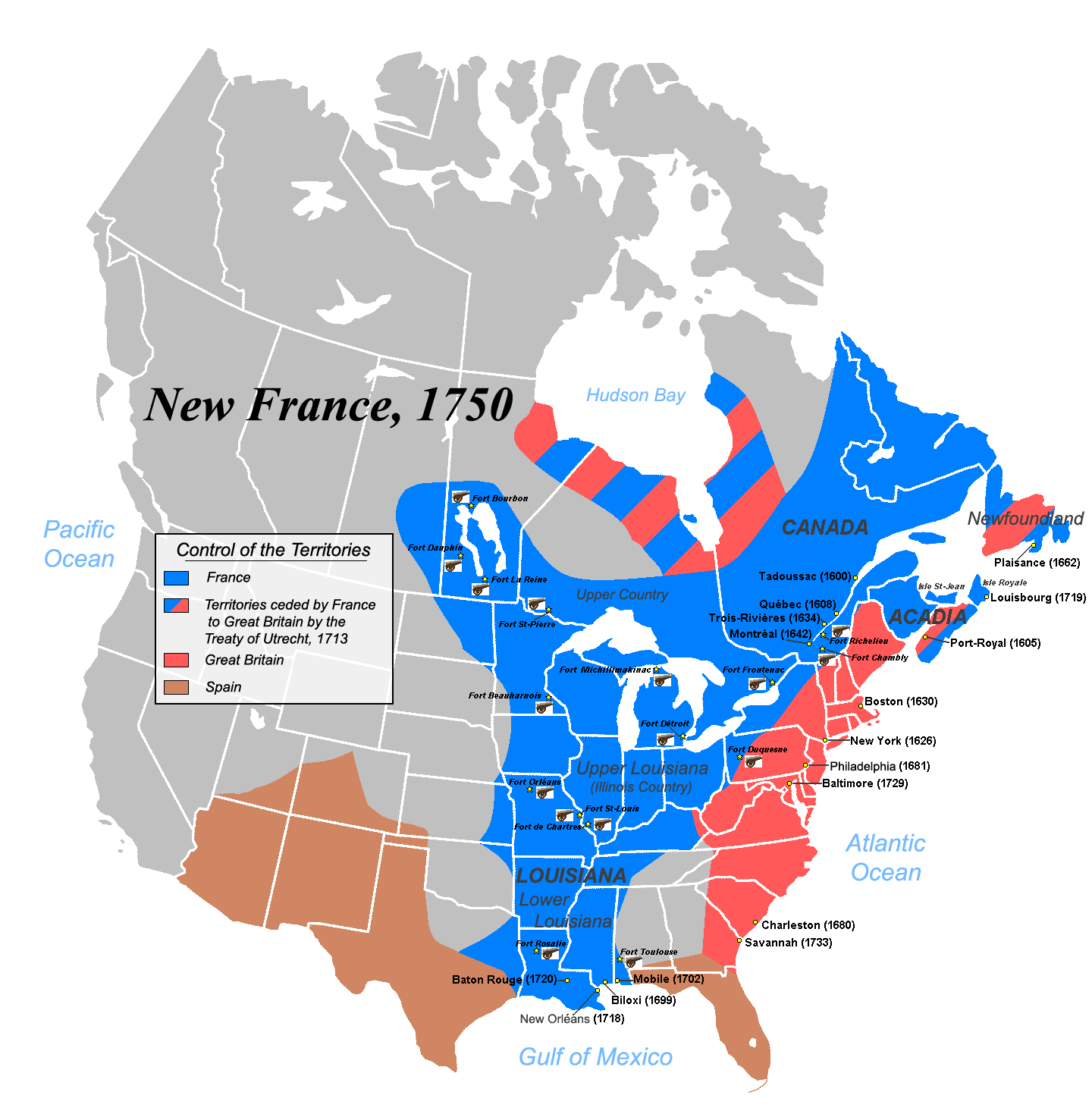
New France (blue) circa 1750

In the three decades starting in 1632, a large proportion of immigrants to New France came from Perche, in what has been called the Percheron immigration movement. Many Percherons were thus recruited to work in seigneuries being establishing along the Saint Lawrence valley. The Beauport seigneurie, New France's first agricultural-oriented seigneurie, was granted in 1634 to Robert Giffard de Moncel by the Company of Hundred Associates. While the total number of emigrants was small, Perche had a much higher rate of emigration to New France than most other regions of France. Nearly all French Canadians have some ancestors from the villages of Perche. Prominent last names from Perche who came to Canada starting just before the end of Samuel de Champlain's tenure include: Côté, Boucher, Cloutier, Guyon (Dion), Tremblay and Paradis.

After the French Revolution, Perche was divided into four departments: Orne, Eure-et-Loir, Sarthe, and Loir-et-Cher. At this time, national law replaced FR:coûtume du Perche or local, customary law.

In 1998, the government of France created the Perche Regional Nature Park (Parc naturel régional du Perche – see FR:Perche (région naturelle)). The park is forested mostly by beech, birch, chestnut, oak (especially sessile and pedunculate species), as well as conifers (especially Douglas fir and pine species) populated by wildlife including boar, buzzard, deer, squirrel, woodcock and woodpecker species.

== See also ==
- Communes of the Eure department
- FR:Perche (région naturelle)
- Zacharie Cloutier
- Tironensian Order
