= François de Surienne =

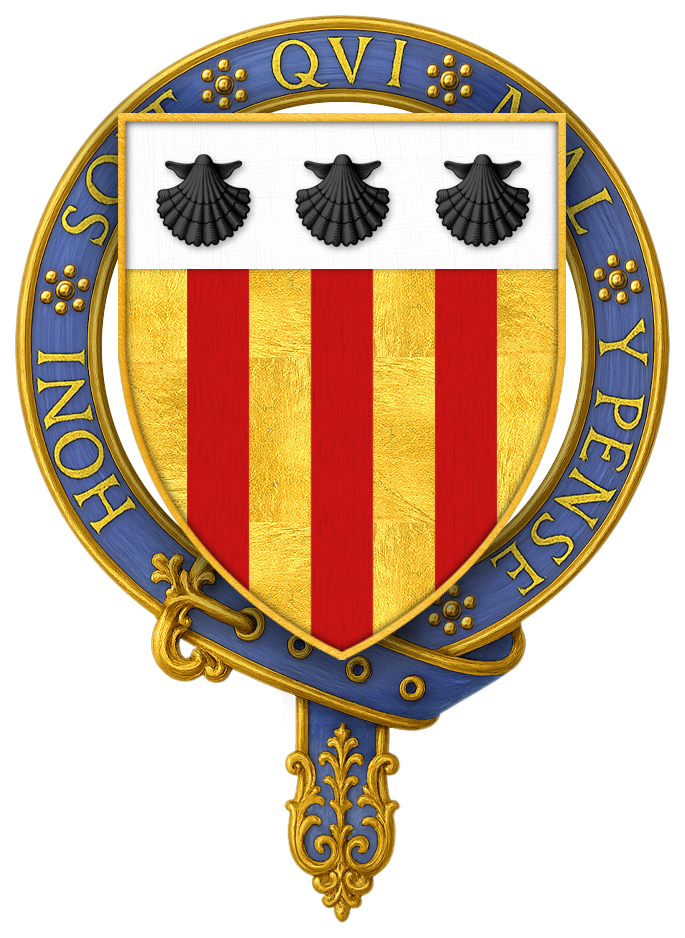
- Coat of arms of François de Surienne, KG
- Born: c. 1398; Crown of Aragon
- Died: 8 April 1462
- Occupations: Mercenary, gunner, engineer
- Title: Lord of Loigny, Pisy, and Châteaugirard
- Relatives: Perrinet Gressart (fr) (uncle); Rodrigo Borgia (nephew)
- Awards: Order of the Garter (1447-11-27)

François de Surienne (French pronunciation: [fʁɑ̃swa də syʁjɛn]; c. 1398 – 8 April 1462) was a Spanish mercenary and engineer, a specialist in fortification and artillery, who was active in Normandy and Burgundy in the 15th century. He was lord of Pisy and of Châtel-Gérard as well as bailli of Chartres and of Saint-Pierre-le-Moûtier. His name is generally given in Spanish as Francisco de Soriano, Sarriera, Sariñera, Siurana, and Sureda. Since he was born in Aragon, he was also known in France by his demonym, the Aragonese (French: l'Arragonais).

A mercenary and adventurer, Surienne fought in the Hundred Years' War on the side of the English, becoming a trusted captain and agent. His services and familial connections earned him a number of titles, lands, and important offices in France.

Surienne is noted for launching an attack on Fougères, Brittany, in 1449, a move which precipitated the formal breaking of an ongoing truce between the English and the French. The failure of the English to support him prompted Surienne to sever ties with England, and he served Charles VII of France for the remainder of his life.

== Origin and family ==
"François de Surienne" is a corruption in French of his native name, which has multiple variants due to the diversity of dialects in his native country of Aragon. Soriano, Sarriera, Sariñera, Siurana, and Sureda all feature among sources as his surname.

He was a nephew of Perrinet Gressart, who held Passy castle, through his marriage on 4 June 1426 to Étiennette de Grésille. He was perhaps related to the Borgia, and possibly the uncle of Rodrigo Borgia, who became Pope in 1492 under the name Alexander VI. His daughter Jeanne married Richard Aux-Épaules, a faithful Surienne retainer, châtelain of Longny for his father-in-law.

== Biography ==
=== Titles ===
De Surienne, known as "the Aragonese" was lord of Pisy, Châtel-Gérard, and Loigny (Lunée), bailiff of Chartres and Saint-Pierre-le-Moûtier, and captain of Montargis, Saint-Germain-en-Laye and Pont-Audemer. He was also governor of Le Mans, constable of Portchester Castle, governor of Lower Normandy for the king of England, knight of the Garter, adviser to the king of England, Councilor and Chamberlain of the Duke of Burgundy, and grand master of the ducal artillery.

=== Siege of Fougères ===
François de Surienne was made a Knight of the Garter on 27 November 1447. At the time he was an adventurer in the pay of the English, and took thirty-two towns before, on 23 March 1449, he seized the Breton town of Fougères while a truce between France and England was in force. This action became a pretext to break the truce, triggering the last phase of the Hundred Years' War. He launched this attack from the city of Condé-sur-Noireau, which was under the lordship of the Englishman Sir John Fastolf of Caister Castle, Norfolk (1380-1459).

=== Later career with the English ===
In 1461, he was bailiff of Chartres

King Alfonso V of Aragon sent a letter to the King of France, Charles VII, on 10 November 1450, which recommended Franciscus Dictus Arragonennsis.

Modernising the fortifications of Dijon from 1461, he then improved the defences of the castle of Fougères by reinforcing the ancient fortifications by placing works in front, thus protecting the old walls. The torn outline then appears in some parts of the fortification, in particular the weak points.

=== Career with the Burgandians ===
Renowned as among the most valiant men of war of his time, after twenty years in the service of King of England, he entered the service of Duke Philip III of Burgundy, and accompanied him as governor during the campaign against Ghent.

The years of peace during which he was in charge of the artillery enabled him to bring about equipment improvements which the experience of past wars seemed to indicate: the invention of trunnions and, consequently, that of the flanged carriages seem belong to that time.

He died on 8 April 1462, aged 64, and was succeeded by Messire Waleran de Soissons.
