= La Lande-sur-Eure =

- Part of Longny les Villages
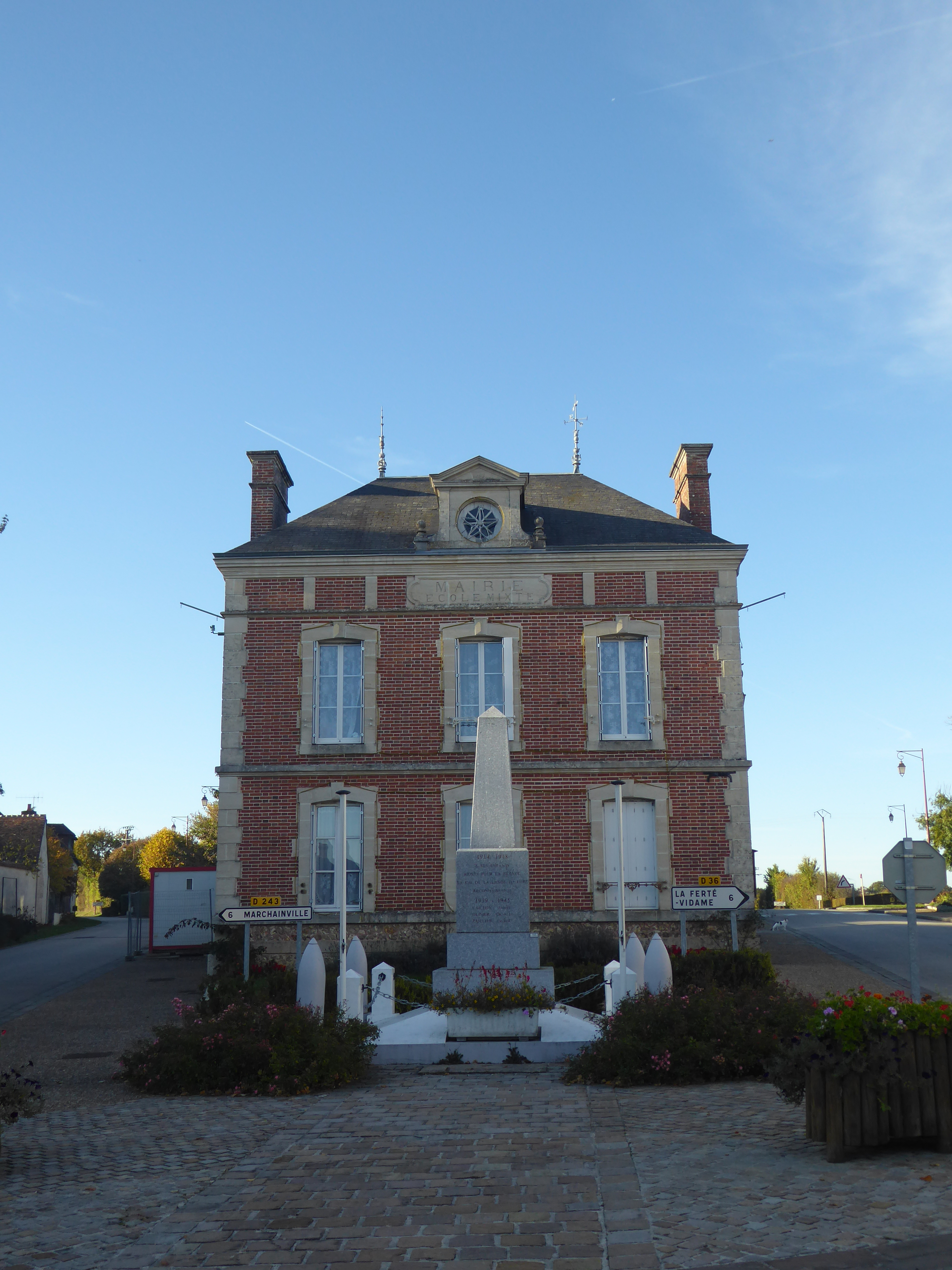
- Town hall
- Location of La Lande-sur-Eure
- Location within France Location within Normandy
- Coordinates: 48°33′29″N 0°51′54″E
- Country: France
- Region: Normandy
- Department: Orne
- Arrondissement: Mortagne-au-Perche
- Canton: Tourouvre
- Commune: Longny les Villages
- Area^{1}: 15.78 km^{2} (6.09 sq mi)
- Elevation: 230 m (750 ft)
- Highest elevation: 286 m (938 ft)
- Lowest elevation: 215 m (705 ft)
- Population (2022): 179
  - Density: 11.3/km^{2} (29.4/sq mi)
- Time zone: UTC+01:00 (CET)
  - Summer (DST): UTC+02:00 (CEST)
- Postal code: 61290
- ^{1} French Land Register data, which excludes lakes, ponds, glaciers > 1 km^{2} (0.386 sq mi or 247 acres) and river estuaries.

La Lande-sur-Eure (French pronunciation: [la lɑ̃d syʁ œʁ]) is a former commune in the Orne department in north-western France. On 1 January 2016, it was merged into the new commune of Longny les Villages. La Lande-sur-Eure is located in the canton of Tourouvre and in the arrondissement of Mortagne-au-Perche. Its postal code is 61290.

== See also ==
- Communes of the Orne department
