= Moussonvilliers =

- Part of Charencey
- Location of Moussonvilliers
- Location within France Location within Normandy
- Coordinates: 48°38′16″N 0°47′37″E
- Country: France
- Region: Normandy
- Department: Orne
- Arrondissement: Mortagne-au-Perche
- Canton: Tourouvre
- Commune: Charencey
- Area^{1}: 21.94 km^{2} (8.47 sq mi)
- Elevation: 220 m (720 ft)
- Highest elevation: 259 m (850 ft)
- Lowest elevation: 185 m (607 ft)
- Population (2022): 213
  - Density: 9.71/km^{2} (25.1/sq mi)
- Time zone: UTC+01:00 (CET)
  - Summer (DST): UTC+02:00 (CEST)
- Postal code: 61190
- ^{1} French Land Register data, which excludes lakes, ponds, glaciers > 1 km^{2} (0.386 sq mi or 247 acres) and river estuaries.

Moussonvilliers (French pronunciation: [musɔ̃vilje]) is a former commune in the Orne department in north-western France. On 1 January 2018, it was merged into the new commune of Charencey.

Pierre Laval, who served as the Prime Minister of France from 1942 to 1944, purchased the Domaine de la Corbière for 400,000 French francs in 1923, where he raised cattle and bred horses.

== See also ==
- Communes of the Orne department
