= Forets, etangs et tourbieres du Haut-Perche =

Forets, etangs et tourbieres du Haut-Perche translated as the Forests, ponds peat bogs of Haut-Perche is a Natura 2000 conservation area that is 3,670 hectares in size.

== Geography ==
This site is split into three distinct environmental sectors;

- The Perche and La Trappe forest sector, which is an oak-beech forest growing in acidic soils.
- The Réno-Valdieu sector, which is distinguished by the character neutrophil from his oak-beech forest growing in acid neutral soils. This region also includes the limestone woods and lawns of the Bandonniere located near Longny-au-Perche.
- At the eastern end is a chain of Perche forest ponds and peaty environments.

It is spread across 6 different communes all within the Orne department;

1. Charencey
2. Feings
3. Longny les Villages
4. Le Mage
5. Moutiers-au-Perche
6. Tourouvre au Perche

== Conservation ==
The conservation area has fifteen species listed in Annex 2 of the Habitats Directive;

1. European bullhead
2. Bullhead
3. Brook lamprey
4. white-clawed crayfish
5. Jersey tiger
6. Marsh fritillary
7. European stag beetle
8. Northern crested newt
9. Lesser horseshoe bat
10. Greater horseshoe bat
11. Western barbastelle
12. Geoffroy's bat
13. Bechstein's bat
14. Greater mouse-eared bat
15. floating water-plantain.

In addition the Natura 2000 site has eighteen habitats protected under the Habitats Directive.
