= Moulicent =

- Part of Longny les Villages
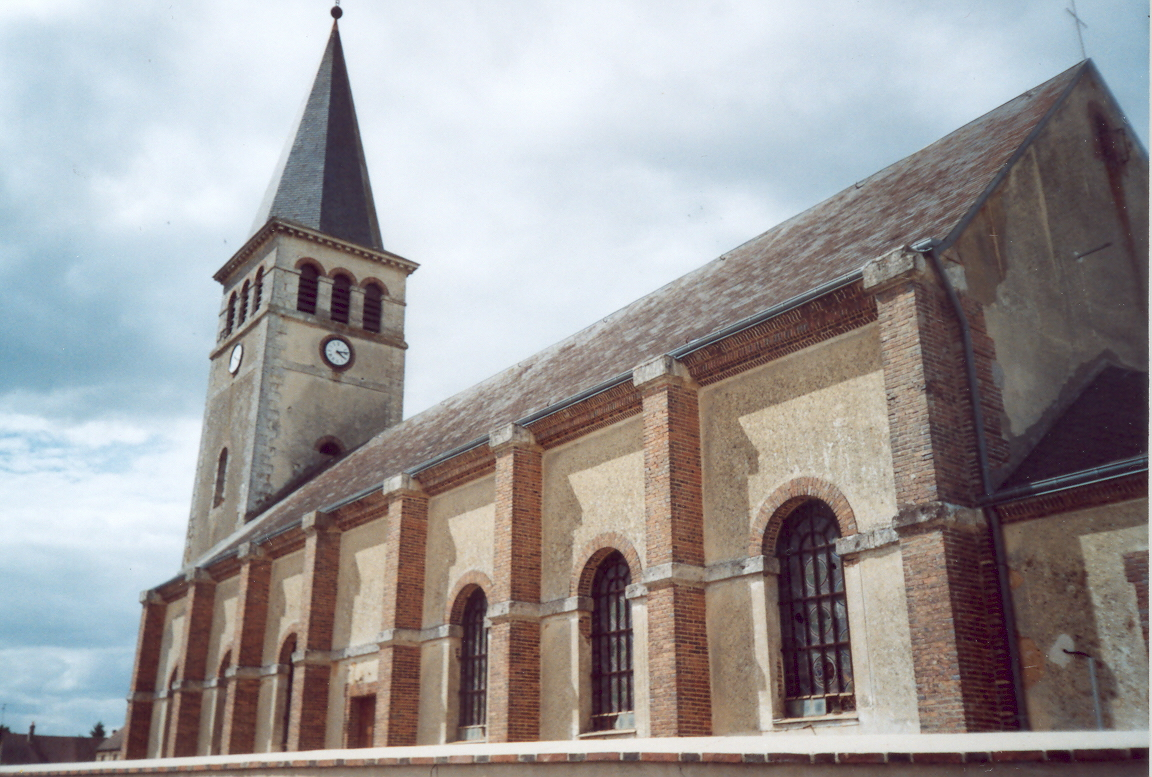
- Church of St. Denis, Moulicent
- Location of Moulicent
- Location within France Location within Normandy
- Coordinates: 48°33′49″N 0°45′36″E
- Country: France
- Region: Normandy
- Department: Orne
- Arrondissement: Mortagne-au-Perche
- Canton: Tourouvre
- Commune: Longny les Villages
- Area^{1}: 33.41 km^{2} (12.90 sq mi)
- Elevation: 225 m (738 ft)
- Highest elevation: 246 m (807 ft)
- Lowest elevation: 170 m (560 ft)
- Population (2022): 232
  - Density: 6.94/km^{2} (18.0/sq mi)
- Time zone: UTC+01:00 (CET)
  - Summer (DST): UTC+02:00 (CEST)
- Postal code: 61290
- ^{1} French Land Register data, which excludes lakes, ponds, glaciers > 1 km^{2} (0.386 sq mi or 247 acres) and river estuaries.

Moulicent (French pronunciation: [mulisɑ̃]) is a former commune in the Orne department in north-western France. On 1 January 2016, it was merged into the new commune of Longny les Villages.

== See also ==
- Communes of the Orne department
