= Louis Philipon de La Madelaine =

French writer, chansonnier, philologist and goguettier

Louis Philipon de La Madelaine (October 1734 in Lyon – 19 April 1818 in Paris) was an 18th–19th-century French writer, chansonnier, philologist and goguettier.

Intendant des finances of the comte d’Artois, Philipon de La Madelaine wrote songs, comédie en vaudevilles, educational works and dictionaries.

He was successively a member of two famous goguettes: Les diners du Vaudeville and the Caveau moderne.

== Ideas on education ==
In Vues patriotiques Philipon presented an educational plan for the poor to conform to their state and resign themselves to their hardships, "sweetening their lives with the honey of religion". He added that he knew of no more dangerous weapon than knowledge in the possession of the people, who, in order not to break their chains, were "ne sauroient les couvrir trop de fleurs" by their superiors.

== Works ==
- Choix de remarques sur la langue française, extraites des meilleurs ouvrages en ce genre
- De l'Éducation des collèges
- Des Homonymes français ou mots qui dans notre langue se ressemblent par le son et diffèrent par le sens
- Des Moyens d'indemniser l'innocence injustement accusée et punie
- Dictionnaire de la langue françoise, abrégé du Dictionnaire de l'Académie, augmentée d'environ deux mille mots usuels et de vocabulaires orthographiques : 1. de géographie; 2. de mythologie; 3. des noms des personnages célèbres cités dans l'histoire, Paris, J.-A. Boiste
- Dictionnaire des rimes, précédé d'un nouveau traité de la versification française, et suivi d'un essai sur la langue poétique
- Dictionnaire portatif de la langue française, abrégé du Dictionnaire de l'Académie françoise
- Dictionnaire portatif des poètes français morts depuis 1050 jusqu'à 1804, précédé d'une histoire abrégée de la poésie française
- Grammaire des gens du monde, ou la Langue française enseignée par l'usage
- L'Art de traduire le latin en français, réduit en principes, à l'usage des jeunes gens qui étudient cette langue, par un ancien professeur d'éloquence
- Le Guide du promeneur aux Tuileries, ou Description du palais et du jardin national des Tuileries, en l'an VI de la République française
- Manuel épistolaire à l'usage de la jeunesse, ou Instructions générales et particulières sur les divers genres de correspondance, suivies d'exemples puisés dans nos meilleurs écrivains
- Manuel, ou Nouveau guide du promeneur aux Tuileries, contenant la description de ce palais et celles de toutes les statues qui embellissent le jardin
- Modèles de lettres sur différents sujets
- Vues patriotiques sur l'éducation du peuple, tant des villes que de la campagne, avec beaucoup de notes intéressantes

=== Theatre ===
- Agricol Viala, ou le Jeune héros de la Durance, fait historique et patriotique, one-act in prose mingled with song, (Paris, Théâtre des Amis de la Patrie, 3 messidor An II.] Lyrics by citizen Philipon, music by citizen L. Jadin
- Carlin débutant à Bergame, comedy in 1 act and in prose, mingled with vaudevilles, with Chrétien-Siméon Le Prévost d'Iray, (Paris, Vaudeville, 26 thermidor An X)
- Chaulieu à Fontenay, one-act comedy, in prose, mingled with vaudevilles, by citizens Philipon-La Madelaine and Ségur jeune, (Paris, Théâtre du Vaudeville, 14 fructidor An VII)
- Gentil Bernard, one-act comedy, in prose, mingled with vaudevilles, by citizens Le Prévôt [″sic″] d'Iray and Philipon La Madelaine, (Paris, Vaudeville, 1er nivôse An IX)
- La Bonne sœur, comédie lyrique, in 1 act and in prose, mingled with songs, by Petit aîné and Philipon de La Madelaine, music by Bruni, (Paris, Théâtre de la rue Feydeau, 2 pluviôse An IX)
- Le Dédit mal gardé, divertissement patriotique in 1 act, in prose and in vaudevilles, by citizens Léger and Philipon, (Paris, Vaudeville, 4 messidor An II)
- Le Terme du voyage, one-act opéra comique, in prose, mingled with arriettes, by Philippon de La Madelaine and Petit aîné, music by Louis Alexandre Piccinni, (Paris, Théâtre des Variétés, 9 prairial An IX)
- Les Troubadours, one-act comedy, in prose, mingled with vaudevilles, avec les airs notés, with Le Prévost d'Iray, (Paris, Vaudeville, 18 March 1797)
- Maître Adam, menuisier de Nevers, comédie en 1 acte, en prose, mêlée de vaudevilles, avec Le Prévost d'Iray, (Paris, Théâtre du Vaudeville, 29 prairial An III)

=== Songs ===
- Choix des chansons de M. Ph. de La Madelaine
- L'Élève d'Épicure, ou Choix des chansons de L. Philipon La Madelaine. Précédé d'une notice sur Épicure et sur le Caveau, et suivi de quelques contes en vers
