= Saint-Maurice-lès-Charencey =

- Part of Charencey
- Location of Saint-Maurice-lès-Charencey
- Location within France Location within Normandy
- Coordinates: 48°39′02″N 0°45′33″E
- Country: France
- Region: Normandy
- Department: Orne
- Arrondissement: Mortagne-au-Perche
- Canton: Tourouvre
- Commune: Charencey
- Area^{1}: 16.19 km^{2} (6.25 sq mi)
- Elevation: 204 m (669 ft)
- Highest elevation: 256 m (840 ft)
- Lowest elevation: 189 m (620 ft)
- Population (2022): 456
  - Density: 28.2/km^{2} (72.9/sq mi)
- Time zone: UTC+01:00 (CET)
  - Summer (DST): UTC+02:00 (CEST)
- Postal code: 61190
- ^{1} French Land Register data, which excludes lakes, ponds, glaciers > 1 km^{2} (0.386 sq mi or 247 acres) and river estuaries.

Saint-Maurice-lès-Charencey (French pronunciation: [sɛ̃ mɔʁis lɛ ʃaʁɑ̃sɛ]) is a former commune in the Orne department in north-western France. On 1 January 2018, it was merged into the new commune of Charencey.

== See also ==
- Communes of the Orne department
