= Neuilly-sur-Eure =

- Part of Longny les Villages
- Location of Neuilly-sur-Eure
- Location within France Location within Normandy
- Coordinates: 48°32′34″N 0°54′15″E
- Country: France
- Region: Normandy
- Department: Orne
- Arrondissement: Mortagne-au-Perche
- Canton: Tourouvre
- Commune: Longny les Villages
- Area^{1}: 21.47 km^{2} (8.29 sq mi)
- Highest elevation: 283 m (928 ft)
- Lowest elevation: 207 m (679 ft)
- Population (2022): 608
  - Density: 28.3/km^{2} (73.3/sq mi)
- Demonym: Neuillois
- Time zone: UTC+01:00 (CET)
  - Summer (DST): UTC+02:00 (CEST)
- Postal code: 61290
- ^{1} French Land Register data, which excludes lakes, ponds, glaciers > 1 km^{2} (0.386 sq mi or 247 acres) and river estuaries.

Neuilly-sur-Eure (French pronunciation: [nœji syʁ œʁ], literally Neuilly on Eure) is a former commune in the Orne department in north-western France. On 1 January 2016, it was merged into the new commune of Longny les Villages.

== See also ==
- Communes of the Orne department
