= Saint-Victor-de-Réno =

- Part of Longny les Villages
- Coat of arms
- Location of Saint-Victor-de-Réno
- Location within France Location within Normandy
- Coordinates: 48°30′12″N 0°41′58″E
- Country: France
- Region: Normandy
- Department: Orne
- Arrondissement: Mortagne-au-Perche
- Canton: Tourouvre
- Commune: Longny les Villages
- Area^{1}: 12.32 km^{2} (4.76 sq mi)
- Elevation: 140 m (460 ft)
- Highest elevation: 239 m (784 ft)
- Lowest elevation: 136 m (446 ft)
- Population (2022): 167
  - Density: 13.6/km^{2} (35.1/sq mi)
- Time zone: UTC+01:00 (CET)
  - Summer (DST): UTC+02:00 (CEST)
- Postal code: 61290
- ^{1} French Land Register data, which excludes lakes, ponds, glaciers > 1 km^{2} (0.386 sq mi or 247 acres) and river estuaries.

Saint-Victor-de-Réno (French pronunciation: [sɛ̃ viktɔʁ də ʁeno]) is a former commune in the Orne department in north-western France. On 1 January 2016, it was merged into the new commune of Longny les Villages.

== See also ==
- Communes of the Orne department
