= Marchainville =

- Part of Longny les Villages
- Location of Marchainville
- Location within France Location within Normandy
- Coordinates: 48°35′07″N 0°48′57″E
- Country: France
- Region: Normandy
- Department: Orne
- Arrondissement: Mortagne-au-Perche
- Canton: Tourouvre
- Commune: Longny les Villages
- Area^{1}: 21.61 km^{2} (8.34 sq mi)
- Elevation: 235 m (771 ft)
- Highest elevation: 267 m (876 ft)
- Lowest elevation: 212 m (696 ft)
- Population (2022): 207
  - Density: 9.58/km^{2} (24.8/sq mi)
- Time zone: UTC+01:00 (CET)
  - Summer (DST): UTC+02:00 (CEST)
- Postal code: 61290
- ^{1} French Land Register data, which excludes lakes, ponds, glaciers > 1 km^{2} (0.386 sq mi or 247 acres) and river estuaries.

Marchainville (French pronunciation: [maʁʃɛ̃vil]) is a former commune in the Orne department in north-western France. On 1 January 2016, it was merged into the new commune of Longny les Villages.

== See also ==
- Communes of the Orne department
