= Monceaux-au-Perche =

- Part of Longny les Villages
- Coat of arms
- Location of Monceaux-au-Perche
- Location within France Location within Normandy
- Coordinates: 48°29′11″N 0°42′20″E
- Country: France
- Region: Normandy
- Department: Orne
- Arrondissement: Mortagne-au-Perche
- Canton: Tourouvre
- Commune: Longny les Villages
- Area^{1}: 3.15 km^{2} (1.22 sq mi)
- Elevation: 157 m (515 ft)
- Highest elevation: 227 m (745 ft)
- Lowest elevation: 137 m (449 ft)
- Population (2022): 80
  - Density: 25/km^{2} (66/sq mi)
- Demonym: Moncelliens
- Time zone: UTC+01:00 (CET)
  - Summer (DST): UTC+02:00 (CEST)
- Postal code: 61290
- ^{1} French Land Register data, which excludes lakes, ponds, glaciers > 1 km^{2} (0.386 sq mi or 247 acres) and river estuaries.

Monceaux-au-Perche (French pronunciation: [mɔ̃so o pɛʁʃ], before 1992: Monceaux) is a former commune in the Orne department in north-western France. On 1 January 2016, it was merged into the new commune of Longny les Villages.

== See also ==
- Communes of the Orne department
