= Le Ménil-Bérard =

- Commune
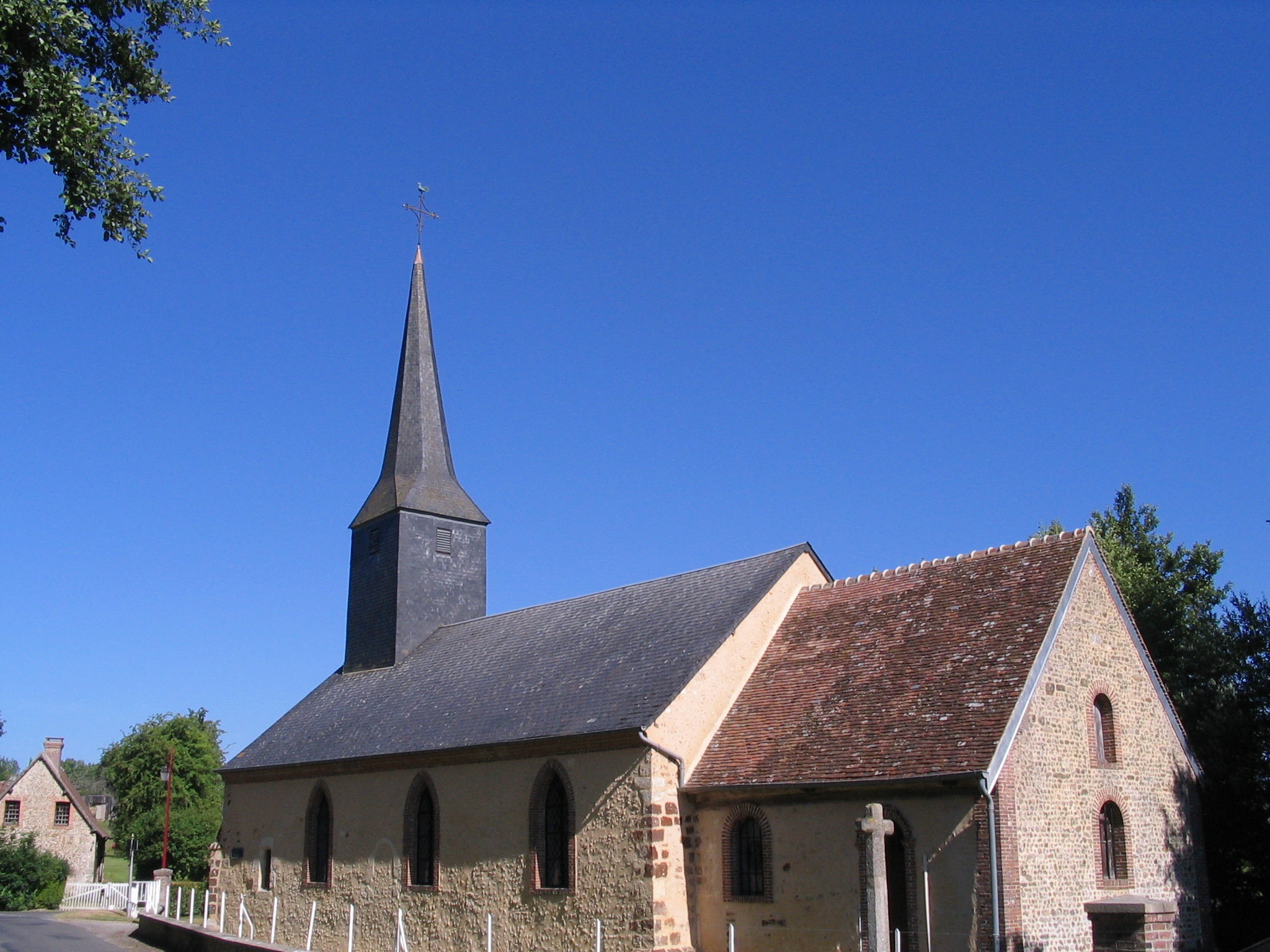
- The church in Le Ménil-Bérard

- Coat of arms
- Location of Le Ménil-Bérard
- Location within France Location within Normandy
- Coordinates: 48°42′36″N 0°30′44″E
- Country: France
- Region: Normandy
- Department: Orne
- Arrondissement: Mortagne-au-Perche
- Canton: Tourouvre au Perche
- Intercommunality: Pays de L'Aigle

Government
  - Mayor (2020–2026): Hubert Goret
- Area^{1}: 7.33 km^{2} (2.83 sq mi)
- Elevation: 248 m (814 ft)
- Highest elevation: 287 m (942 ft)
- Lowest elevation: 228 m (748 ft)
- Population (2023): 67
  - Density: 9.1/km^{2} (24/sq mi)
- Time zone: UTC+01:00 (CET)
  - Summer (DST): UTC+02:00 (CEST)
- INSEE/Postal code: 61259 /61270
- ^{1} French Land Register data, which excludes lakes, ponds, glaciers > 1 km^{2} (0.386 sq mi or 247 acres) and river estuaries.

Le Ménil-Bérard (French pronunciation: [lə menil beʁaʁ]) is a commune in the Orne department in north-western France.

== Geography ==
Le Ménil-Bérard is made up of the following collection of villages and hamlets, Le Ménil-Bérard, La Corderie and Sècheville.

The L'Aubette river plus two streams the Ruisseau des Vallees and Ruisseau de la Foret flow through the commune.

== See also ==
- Communes of the Orne department
