= Société de Linguistique de Paris =

The Société de Linguistique de Paris (established 1864) is the editing body of the BSL (Bulletin de la Société de Linguistique) journal. Members of the society have included such well-known French linguists as Bréal, Saussure, Meillet, Hyacinthe de Charencey and Benveniste. Its first president was Antoine d'Abbadie.

In addition to its monthly meetings, the group holds a one-day conference each January dedicated to a particular topic. In 1997, it organised the Congrès International des Linguistes in Paris.
