= Irai, Orne =

Irai
- Commune
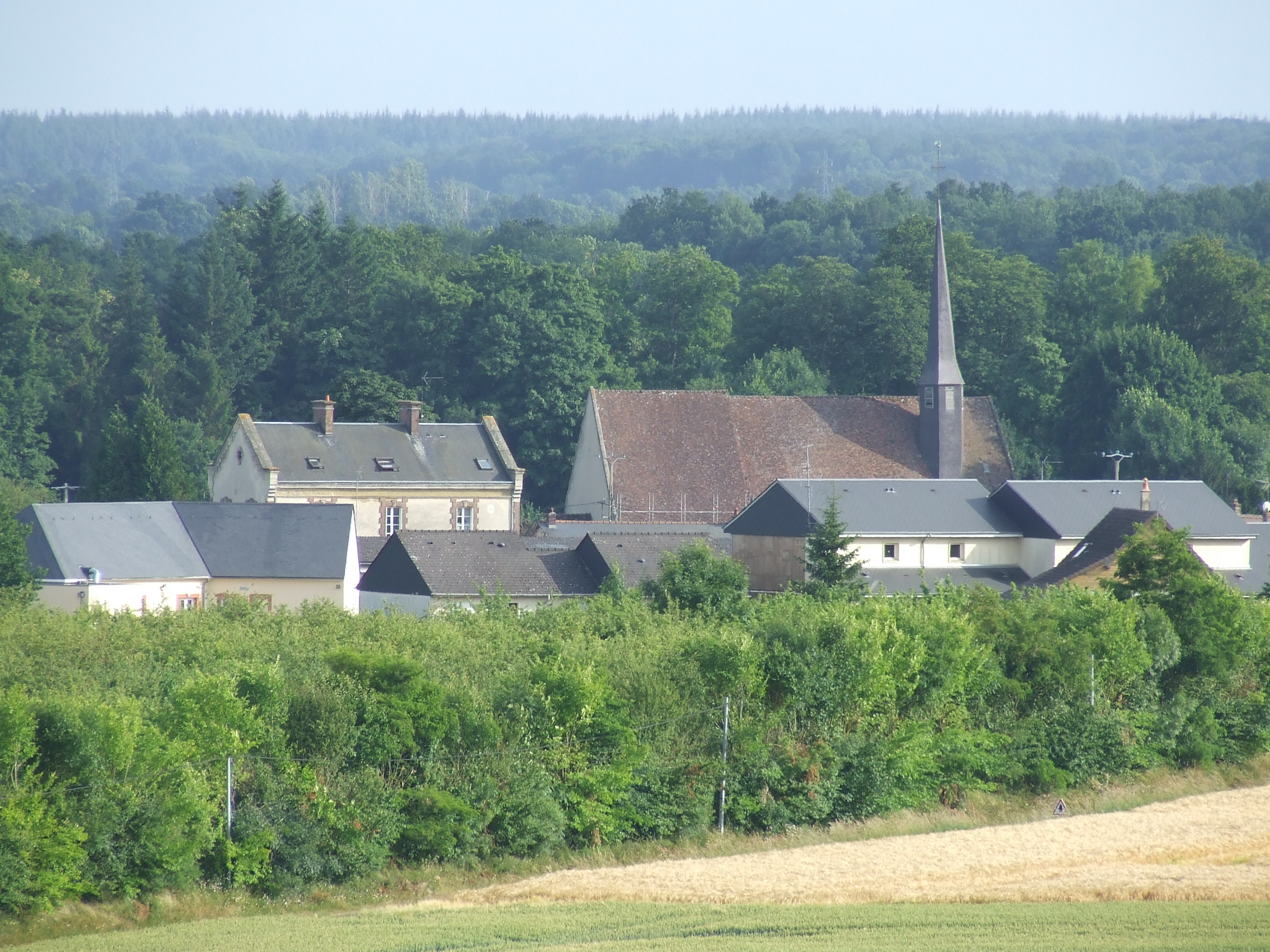
- A general view of Irai
- Location of Irai
- Location within France Location within Normandy
- Coordinates: 48°40′16″N 0°41′48″E
- Country: France
- Region: Normandy
- Department: Orne
- Arrondissement: Mortagne-au-Perche
- Canton: Tourouvre au Perche
- Intercommunality: CC du Pays de l'Aigle

Government
  - Mayor (2020–2026): Jean-Luc Beaufils
- Area^{1}: 14.85 km^{2} (5.73 sq mi)
- Elevation: 230 m (750 ft)
- Highest elevation: 273 m (896 ft)
- Lowest elevation: 203 m (666 ft)
- Population (2023): 603
  - Density: 40.6/km^{2} (105/sq mi)
- Time zone: UTC+01:00 (CET)
  - Summer (DST): UTC+02:00 (CEST)
- INSEE/Postal code: 61208 /61190
- ^{1} French Land Register data, which excludes lakes, ponds, glaciers > 1 km^{2} (0.386 sq mi or 247 acres) and river estuaries.

Irai (French pronunciation: [iʁɛ]) is a commune in the Orne department in north-western France.

== Geography ==
La Ferté-en-Ouche is made up of the following collection of villages and hamlets, La Touche, Irai, Le Tremblay and La Hentrie.

The Commune along with another 70 communes shares part of a 47,681 hectare, Natura 2000 conservation area, called the Forêts et étangs du Perche.

The Avre river flows through the commune.

== Notable people ==
- Chrétien-Siméon Le Prévost d'Iray - (1768 – 1849) a writer of comedies and vaudevilles, born, died and was buried here.

== See also ==
- Communes of the Orne department
