= Auguaise =

- Commune
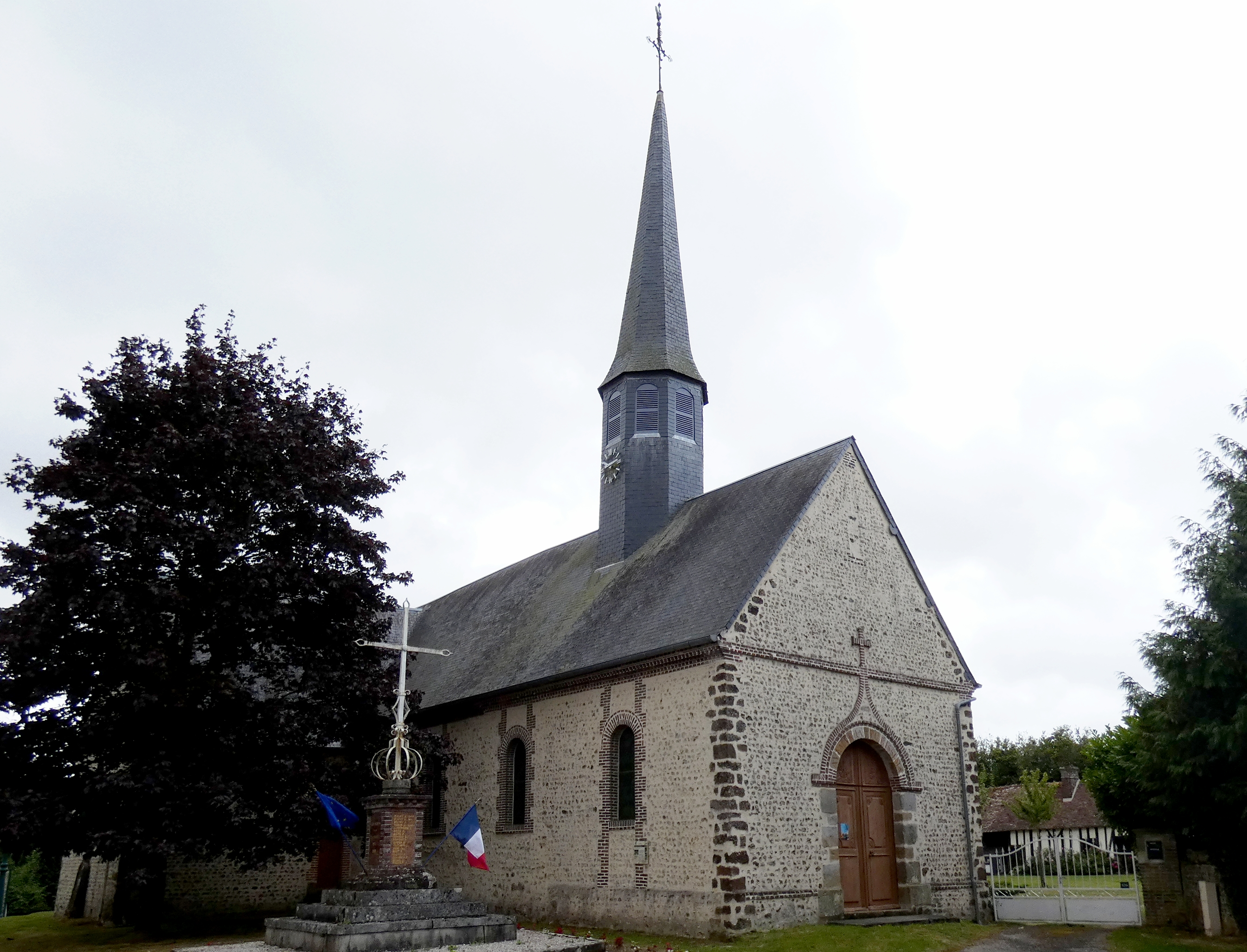
- Location of Auguaise
- Location within France Location within Normandy
- Coordinates: 48°42′06″N 0°33′18″E
- Country: France
- Region: Normandy
- Department: Orne
- Arrondissement: Mortagne-au-Perche
- Canton: Tourouvre au Perche
- Intercommunality: CC Pays de L'Aigle

Government
  - Mayor (2020–2026): Sylvie Molero
- Area^{1}: 2.25 km^{2} (0.87 sq mi)
- Elevation: 300 m (980 ft)
- Highest elevation: 281 m (922 ft)
- Lowest elevation: 245 m (804 ft)
- Population (2023): 196
  - Density: 87.1/km^{2} (226/sq mi)
- Time zone: UTC+01:00 (CET)
  - Summer (DST): UTC+02:00 (CEST)
- INSEE/Postal code: 61012 /61270
- ^{1} French Land Register data, which excludes lakes, ponds, glaciers > 1 km^{2} (0.386 sq mi or 247 acres) and river estuaries.

Auguaise (French pronunciation: [oɡɛz]) is a commune in the Orne department in northwestern France.

== Geography ==
The commune is made up of the following collection of villages and hamlets, La Bouchardière, Auguaise and Le Châtelet.

A river, Le Vivier Tranchant passes through the commune. The Ruisseau du Gru stream flows through the commune.

== Population ==
Historical population
Year	Pop.	±% p.a.
1968	142	—
1975	122	−2.15%
1982	118	−0.48%
1990	103	−1.69%
1999	119	+1.62%
2007	142	+2.23%
2012	168	+3.42%
2017	207	+4.26%
2023	196	−0.91%
Source: INSEE

== See also ==
- Communes of the Orne department
