= Bonnefoi =

- Commune
- Location of Bonnefoi
- Location within France Location within Normandy
- Coordinates: 48°40′22″N 0°34′14″E
- Country: France
- Region: Normandy
- Department: Orne
- Arrondissement: Mortagne-au-Perche
- Canton: Tourouvre au Perche
- Intercommunality: Pays de L'Aigle

Government
  - Mayor (2020–2026): Didier Pitou
- Area^{1}: 5.39 km^{2} (2.08 sq mi)
- Elevation: 300 m (980 ft)
- Highest elevation: 290 m (950 ft)
- Lowest elevation: 217 m (712 ft)
- Population (2023): 187
  - Density: 34.7/km^{2} (89.9/sq mi)
- Time zone: UTC+01:00 (CET)
  - Summer (DST): UTC+02:00 (CEST)
- INSEE/Postal code: 61052 /61270
- ^{1} French Land Register data, which excludes lakes, ponds, glaciers > 1 km^{2} (0.386 sq mi or 247 acres) and river estuaries.

Bonnefoi (French pronunciation: [bɔnfwa]) is a commune in the Orne department in northwestern France.

== Geography ==
The commune is made up of the following collection of villages and hamlets, Sommaire, Le Jarrier, Le Clos du Houx Bonnefoi, La Mullerie and La Rabotière.

Two rivers, the Iton and Le Vivier Tranchant flow through the commune.

== Population ==
Historical population
Year	Pop.	±% p.a.
1968	142	—
1975	115	−2.97%
1982	102	−1.70%
1990	117	+1.73%
1999	131	+1.26%
2007	164	+2.85%
2012	179	+1.77%
2017	185	+0.66%
2023	187	+0.18%
Source: INSEE

== Notable people ==
Jean Gabin (1904 -1976) - an actor, bought the Pichonnière estate in Bonnefoi in 1952.

== See also ==
- Communes of the Orne department
