= Longny les Villages =

- Commune
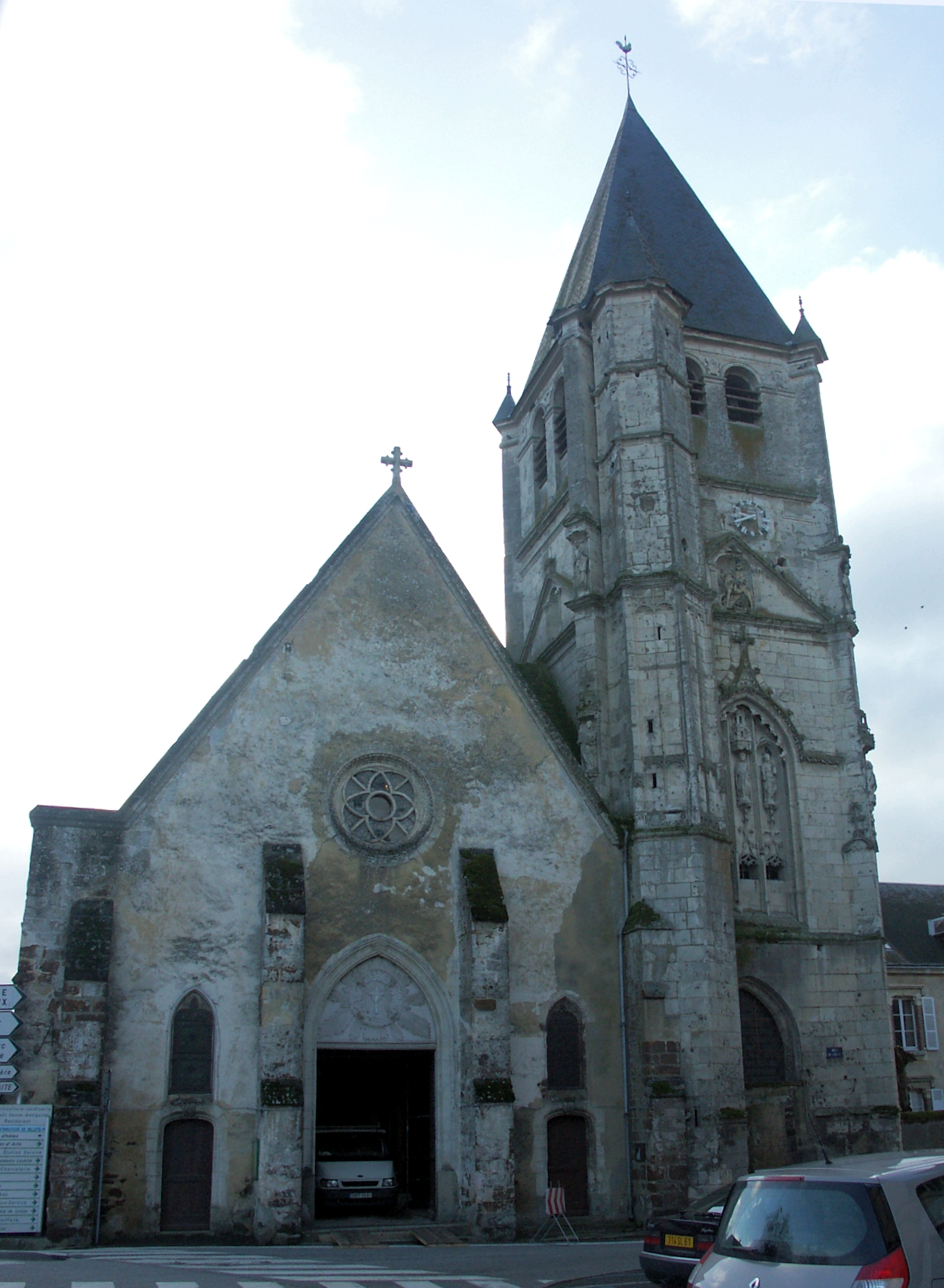
- The church in Longny-au-Perche
- Location of Longny les Villages
- Location within France Location within Normandy
- Coordinates: 48°31′52″N 0°45′07″E
- Country: France
- Region: Normandy
- Department: Orne
- Arrondissement: Mortagne-au-Perche
- Canton: Tourouvre au Perche
- Intercommunality: Hauts du Perche
- Area^{1}: 151.76 km^{2} (58.59 sq mi)
- Population (2023): 2,811
  - Density: 18.52/km^{2} (47.97/sq mi)
- Time zone: UTC+01:00 (CET)
  - Summer (DST): UTC+02:00 (CEST)
- INSEE/Postal code: 61230 /61290
- ^{1} French Land Register data, which excludes lakes, ponds, glaciers > 1 km^{2} (0.386 sq mi or 247 acres) and river estuaries.

Longny les Villages (French pronunciation: [lɔ̃ɲi le vilaʒ], literally Longny the Villages) is a commune in the department of Orne, northwestern France. The municipality was established on 1 January 2016 by merger of the former communes of La Lande-sur-Eure, Longny-au-Perche (the seat), Malétable, Marchainville, Monceaux-au-Perche, Moulicent, Neuilly-sur-Eure and Saint-Victor-de-Réno. Its seat, Longny-au-Perche, is classed as a Petites Cités de Caractère.

== Geography ==
The commune is made up of the following collection of villages and hamlets, La Béchardière, Le Luxerot, La Hiocherie, Marchainville, Le Chêne d'Auvilliers, Moulicent, La Lande-sur-Eure, La Madelainerie, Neuilly-sur-Eure, La Galinière, La Hacquetterie, Les Foulx, Longny les Villages, La Brisardière, La Barbinière, Bizouieau, La Chauvellière, Le Chesnay, Les Échigneux, Saint-Victor-de-Réno and Monceaux-au-Perche.

Longny les Villages along with the communes of Feings, Tourouvre au Perche, Le Mage, Moutiers-au-Perche and Charencey shares part of the Forets, etangs et tourbieres du Haut-Perche a Natura 2000 conservation site. The site measures 3670 hectares and is home to fifteen species protected Flora and Fauna.

In addition the Commune along with another 70 communes shares part of a 47,681 hectare, Natura 2000 conservation area, called the Forêts et étangs du Perche.

Five rivers the Eure, La Corbionne, La Jambée, La Lande and La Commeauche flow through the commune. As well as rivers six streams, Ruisseau de Grenouille, Ruisseau de la Fortiniere, Ruisseau de Saint-Laurent, Ruisseau de Breffin, Ruisseau de Sausvert and Ruisseau de Rumien pass through the commune.

== Population ==
Population data refer to the area corresponding with the commune as of January 2025.

Historical population
Year	Pop.	±% p.a.
1968	3,292	—
1975	3,162	−0.57%
1982	3,206	+0.20%
1990	3,018	−0.75%
1999	3,177	+0.57%
2007	3,195	+0.07%
2012	3,154	−0.26%
2017	3,008	−0.94%
2023	2,811	−1.12%
Source: INSEE

== Notable buildings and places ==
- Filo'Parc is an amusement parc featuring a treetop playgrounds and escape rooms.
- Le coteau de la Bandonnière is a 5 hectares (0.0 sq mi) nature reserve on a limestone hillside of the Robioche valley, that is open to the public via footpath all year round.

=== National heritage sites ===
The Commune has six buildings and areas listed as a Monument historique.

- Pontgirard Manor is a 17th Century Manor in Monceaux-au-Perche with extensive gardens that was classed as a Monument historique in 1972. The two Hectare Garden is open to the public and part of its display features over 30 types of euphorbia.
- Priory of the Madeleine of Reno is a 13th Century priory in Saint-Victor-de-Réno that was classed as a Monument historique in 1983.
- Castle Fort is the remains of a 13th Century castle in Marchainville that was classed as a Monument historique in 1978. The castle was taken in 1364 by Charles the Bad, until Philip the Bold seized it and made himself master of it.
- Saint-Martin church is a 15th Century church in Longny-au-Perche that was classed as a Monument historique in 1909.
- Notre-Dame-de-Pitié chapel is a 16th Century chapel in Longny-au-Perche that was classed as a Monument historique in 1909.
- Malétable church is a church built in 1865 in honor of Our Lady of La Salette and was classed as a Monument historique in 1991.

== Notable people ==
- Pierre-François Jumeau - (1811 – 1895) the founder of Jumeau died here.

== Twin towns – sister cities ==
Argentan is twinned with:

- Milverton, England, United Kingdom

== See also ==
- Communes of the Orne department
