= La Ventrouze =

- Commune
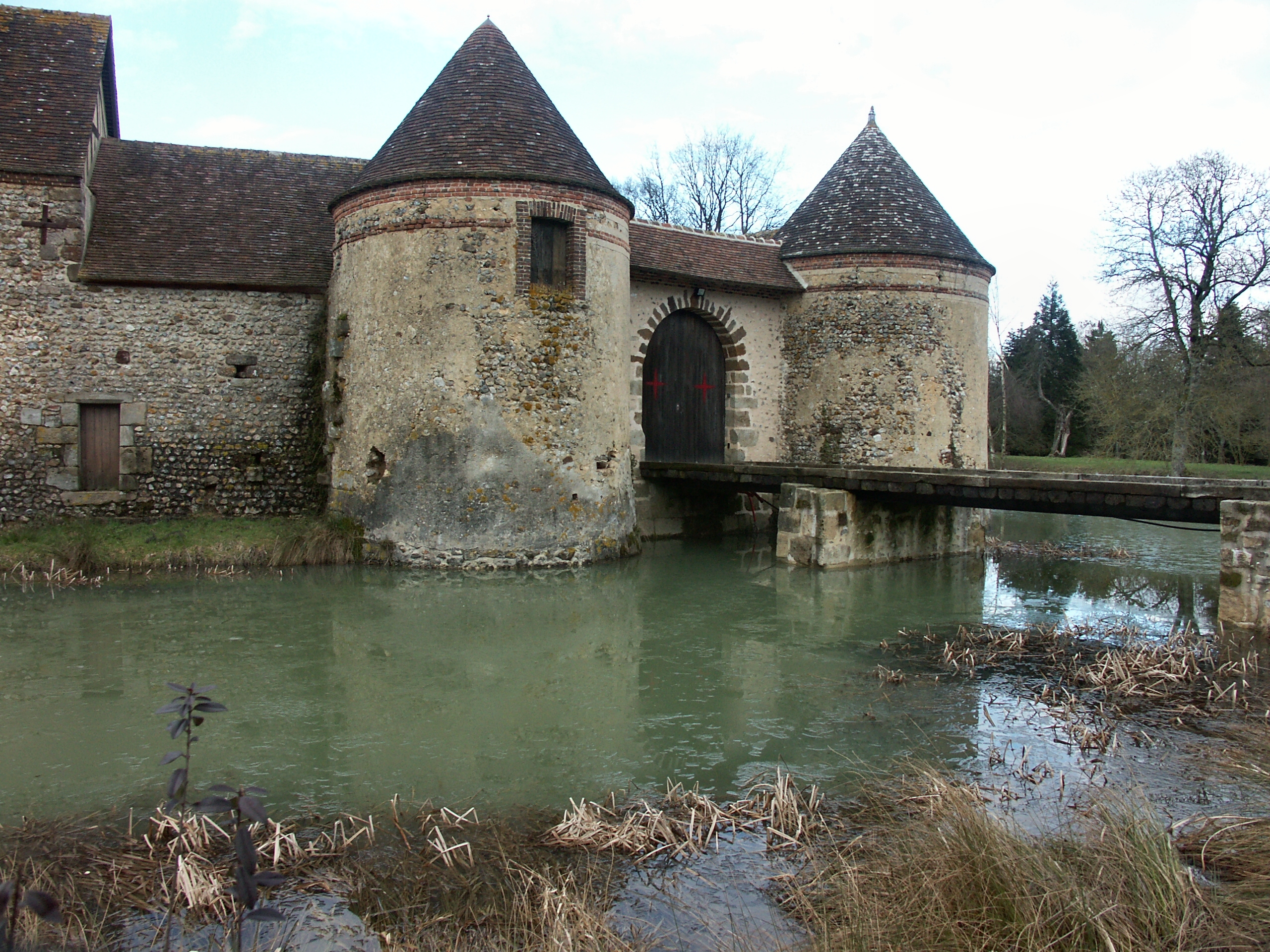
- The chateau in La Ventrouze
- Location of La Ventrouze
- Location within France Location within Normandy
- Coordinates: 48°36′41″N 0°41′50″E
- Country: France
- Region: Normandy
- Department: Orne
- Arrondissement: Mortagne-au-Perche
- Canton: Tourouvre au Perche
- Intercommunality: Hauts du Perche

Government
  - Mayor (2020–2026): Évelyne Revet
- Area^{1}: 7.06 km^{2} (2.73 sq mi)
- Elevation: 298 m (978 ft)
- Highest elevation: 293 m (961 ft)
- Lowest elevation: 239 m (784 ft)
- Population (2023): 120
  - Density: 17/km^{2} (44/sq mi)
- Time zone: UTC+01:00 (CET)
  - Summer (DST): UTC+02:00 (CEST)
- INSEE/Postal code: 61500 /61190
- ^{1} French Land Register data, which excludes lakes, ponds, glaciers > 1 km^{2} (0.386 sq mi or 247 acres) and river estuaries.

La Ventrouze (French pronunciation: [la vɑ̃tʁuz]) is a commune in the Orne department in north-western France.

== Geography ==
The Commune along with another 70 communes shares part of a 47,681 hectare, Natura 2000 conservation area, called the Forêts et étangs du Perche.

A stream, Ruisseau de la Motte, flows through the commune.

== Points of interest ==
- Arboretum de l'Étoile des Andaines - Created in 1947 this arboretum features over 70 hardwood and Conifer trees.

=== National heritage sites ===
The Commune has two buildings and areas listed as a Monument historique.

- Chateau de la Ventrouze a sixteenth century chateau surrounded by a moat, it was registered as a monument in 1979.
- Sainte-Madeleine Church a fifteenth century church, registered as a Monument historique in 1981.

== See also ==
- Communes of the Orne department
