= Saint-Hilaire-sur-Risle =

- Commune
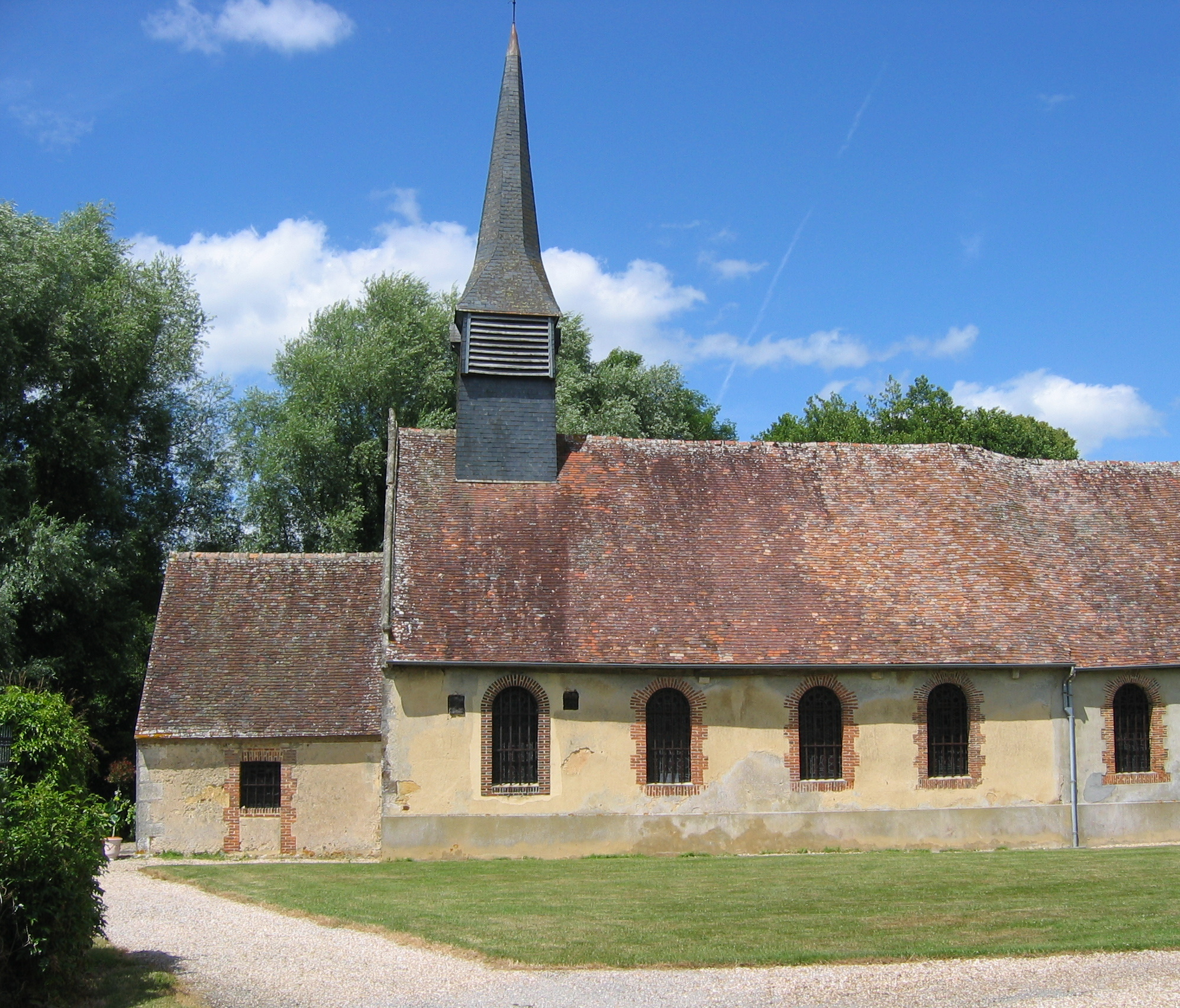
- The church in Saint-Hilaire-sur-Risle
- Location of Saint-Hilaire-sur-Risle
- Location within France Location within Normandy
- Coordinates: 48°43′58″N 0°29′44″E
- Country: France
- Region: Normandy
- Department: Orne
- Arrondissement: Mortagne-au-Perche
- Canton: Tourouvre au Perche

Government
  - Mayor (2020–2026): Jean-Guy Grandin
- Area^{1}: 6.61 km^{2} (2.55 sq mi)
- Elevation: 250 m (820 ft)
- Highest elevation: 270 m (890 ft)
- Lowest elevation: 217 m (712 ft)
- Population (2023): 289
  - Density: 43.7/km^{2} (113/sq mi)
- Time zone: UTC+01:00 (CET)
  - Summer (DST): UTC+02:00 (CEST)
- INSEE/Postal code: 61406 /61270
- ^{1} French Land Register data, which excludes lakes, ponds, glaciers > 1 km^{2} (0.386 sq mi or 247 acres) and river estuaries.

Saint-Hilaire-sur-Risle (French pronunciation: [sɛ̃.t‿ilɛʁ syʁ ʁil], literally Saint-Hilaire on Risle) is a commune in the Orne department in north-western France.

== Geography ==
Two rivers the Risle and L'Aubette flow through the commune.

== Points of interest ==
=== National heritage sites ===
- Château de Saint-Hilaire-sur-Risle a seventeenth century chateau, it was registered as a Monument historique in 1974.

== See also ==
- Communes of the Orne department
