= Charencey, Orne =

Charencey
- Commune
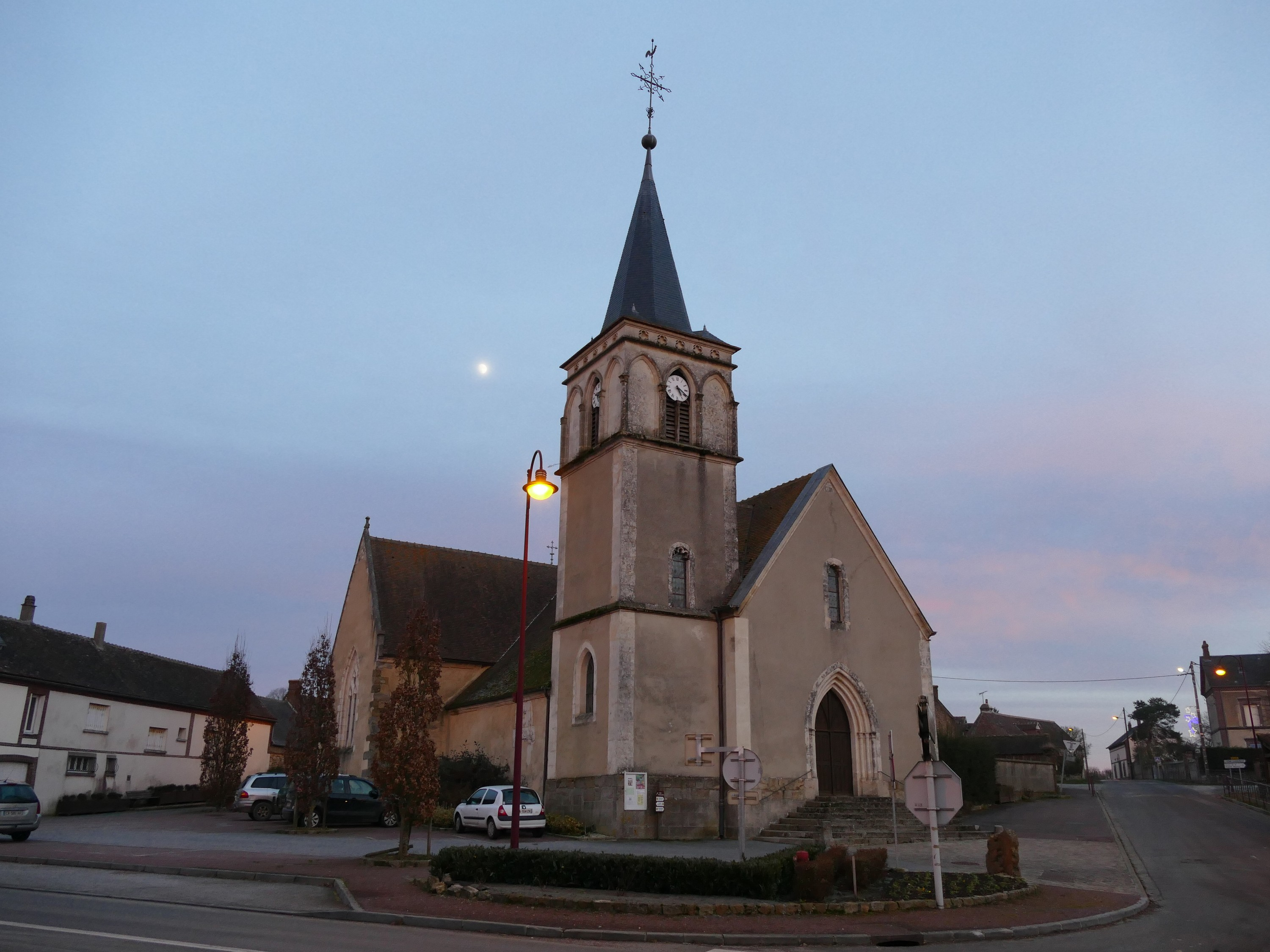
- The church in Saint-Maurice-lès-Charencey
- Location of Charencey
- Location within France Location within Normandy
- Coordinates: 48°39′02″N 0°45′33″E
- Country: France
- Region: Normandy
- Department: Orne
- Arrondissement: Mortagne-au-Perche
- Canton: Tourouvre au Perche
- Intercommunality: Hauts du Perche

Government
  - Mayor (2020–2026): Jean-Claude Juszezak
- Area^{1}: 45.56 km^{2} (17.59 sq mi)
- Population (2023): 754
  - Density: 16.5/km^{2} (42.9/sq mi)
- Time zone: UTC+01:00 (CET)
  - Summer (DST): UTC+02:00 (CEST)
- INSEE/Postal code: 61429 /61190
- ^{1} French Land Register data, which excludes lakes, ponds, glaciers > 1 km^{2} (0.386 sq mi or 247 acres) and river estuaries.

Charencey (French pronunciation: [ʃaʁɑ̃sɛ]) is a commune in the department of Orne, northwestern France. The municipality was established on 1 January 2018 by merger of the former communes of Saint-Maurice-lès-Charencey (the seat), Moussonvilliers and Normandel.

== Geography ==
The commune is made up of the following collection of villages and hamlets, Le Bois Foucher, La Haudière, La Corbière, Saint-Barthélémy, Normandel, Charencey, Le Souci, Les Clottes, Moussonvilliers, Le Cloubois, Le Hubert, La Neigerie and La Vicomté.

Charencey along with the communes of Feings, Longny les Villages, Le Mage, Moutiers-au-Perche and Tourouvre au Perche shares part of the Forets, etangs et tourbieres du Haut-Perche a Natura 2000 conservation site. The site measures 3670 hectares and is home to fifteen species protected Flora and Fauna.

In addition the Commune along with another 70 communes shares part of a 47,681 hectare, Natura 2000 conservation area, called the Forêts et étangs du Perche.

Six streams, Ruisseau Saint-Maurice, Ruisseau de Charencey, Ruisseau de la Motte, Ruisseau de Grenouille, Ruisseau du Bois de la Millasse and Ruisseau de la Gohiere all flow through the commune.

== Notable people ==
- Hyacinthe de Charencey (1832 – 1916), a French philologist died here.

== See also ==
- Communes of the Orne department
