= Beaulieu, Orne =

Beaulieu
- Commune
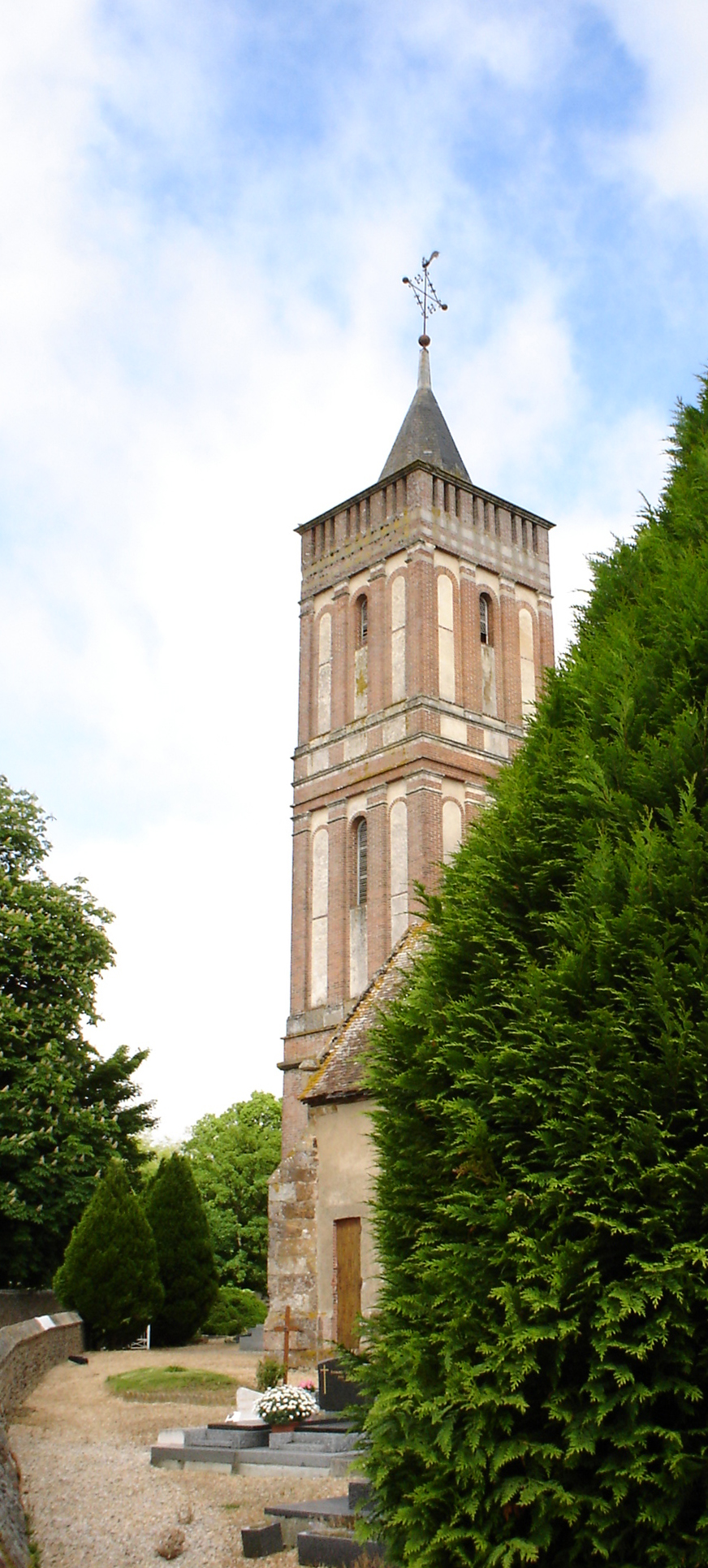
- The church in Beaulieu
- Location of Beaulieu
- Location within France Location within Normandy
- Coordinates: 48°40′52″N 0°44′41″E
- Country: France
- Region: Normandy
- Department: Orne
- Arrondissement: Mortagne-au-Perche
- Canton: Tourouvre au Perche

Government
  - Mayor (2020–2026): Emmanuel Le Secq
- Area^{1}: 18.06 km^{2} (6.97 sq mi)
- Elevation: 196 m (643 ft)
- Highest elevation: 234 m (768 ft)
- Lowest elevation: 188 m (617 ft)
- Population (2023): 212
  - Density: 11.7/km^{2} (30.4/sq mi)
- Time zone: UTC+01:00 (CET)
  - Summer (DST): UTC+02:00 (CEST)
- INSEE/Postal code: 61034 /61190
- ^{1} French Land Register data, which excludes lakes, ponds, glaciers > 1 km^{2} (0.386 sq mi or 247 acres) and river estuaries.

Beaulieu (French pronunciation: [boljø]) is a commune in the Orne department in northwestern France.

== Geography ==
The commune is made up of the following collection of villages and hamlets: La Flûtière, La Blanchardière, Beaulieu and La Bunelière.

The Avre river flows through the commune, in addition to a stream the Ruisseau Saint-Maurice.

== Population ==
Historical population
Year	Pop.	±% p.a.
1968	232	—
1975	213	−1.21%
1982	182	−2.22%
1990	186	+0.27%
1999	186	+0.00%
2007	207	+1.35%
2012	211	+0.38%
2017	211	+0.00%
2023	212	+0.08%
Source: INSEE

== See also ==
- Communes of the Orne department
