= Brethel =

- Commune
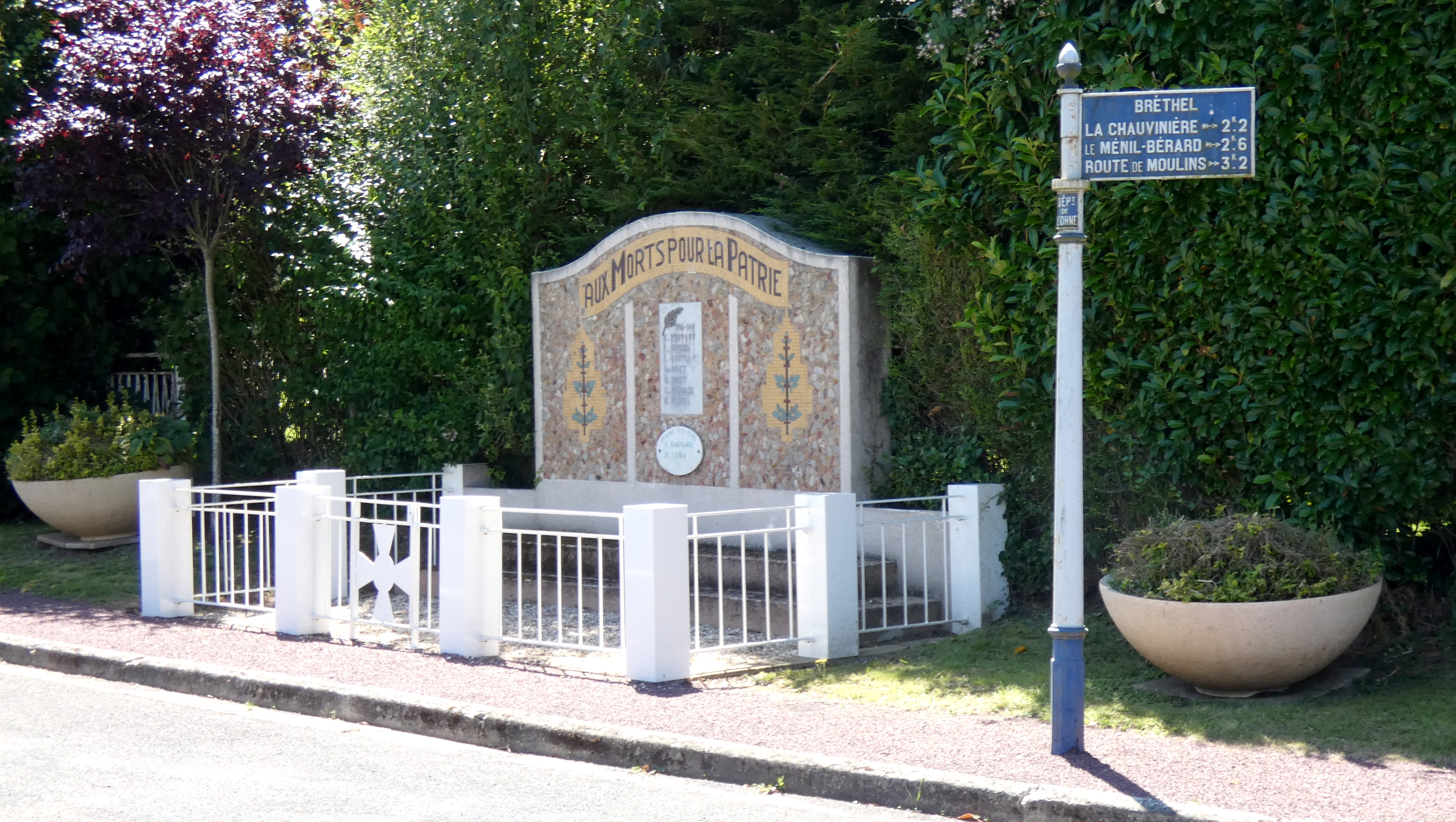

- Coat of arms
- Location of Brethel
- Location within France Location within Normandy
- Coordinates: 48°43′16″N 0°32′29″E
- Country: France
- Region: Normandy
- Department: Orne
- Arrondissement: Mortagne-au-Perche
- Canton: Tourouvre au Perche

Government
  - Mayor (2020–2026): Daniel Marie
- Area^{1}: 2.97 km^{2} (1.15 sq mi)
- Highest elevation: 273 m (896 ft)
- Lowest elevation: 233 m (764 ft)
- Population (2023): 133
  - Density: 44.8/km^{2} (116/sq mi)
- Time zone: UTC+01:00 (CET)
  - Summer (DST): UTC+02:00 (CEST)
- INSEE/Postal code: 61060 /61270
- ^{1} French Land Register data, which excludes lakes, ponds, glaciers > 1 km^{2} (0.386 sq mi or 247 acres) and river estuaries.

Brethel (French pronunciation: [bʁətɛl]) is a commune in the Orne department in northwestern France.

== Geography ==
The commune is made up of the following collection of villages and hamlets, Le Parc du Boulay, La Chauvinière, Brethel, Villeneuve and La Hérissonnière.

A stream, the Ruisseau des Vallees, flows through the commune.

== Population ==
Historical population
| Year | Pop. | ±% p.a. |
|---|---|---|
| 1968 | 125 | — |
| 1975 | 104 | −2.59% |
| 1982 | 108 | +0.54% |
| 1990 | 116 | +0.90% |
| 1999 | 116 | +0.00% |
| 2007 | 123 | +0.74% |
| 2012 | 142 | +2.91% |
| 2017 | 164 | +2.92% |
| 2023 | 133 | −3.43% |
Source: INSEE

== Sport ==
- Terrain Moto Cross de Brethel - Is a Motocross circuit within the commune, which is about 7 km in length.

== See also ==
- Communes of the Orne department
