= La Chapelle-Viel =

- Commune
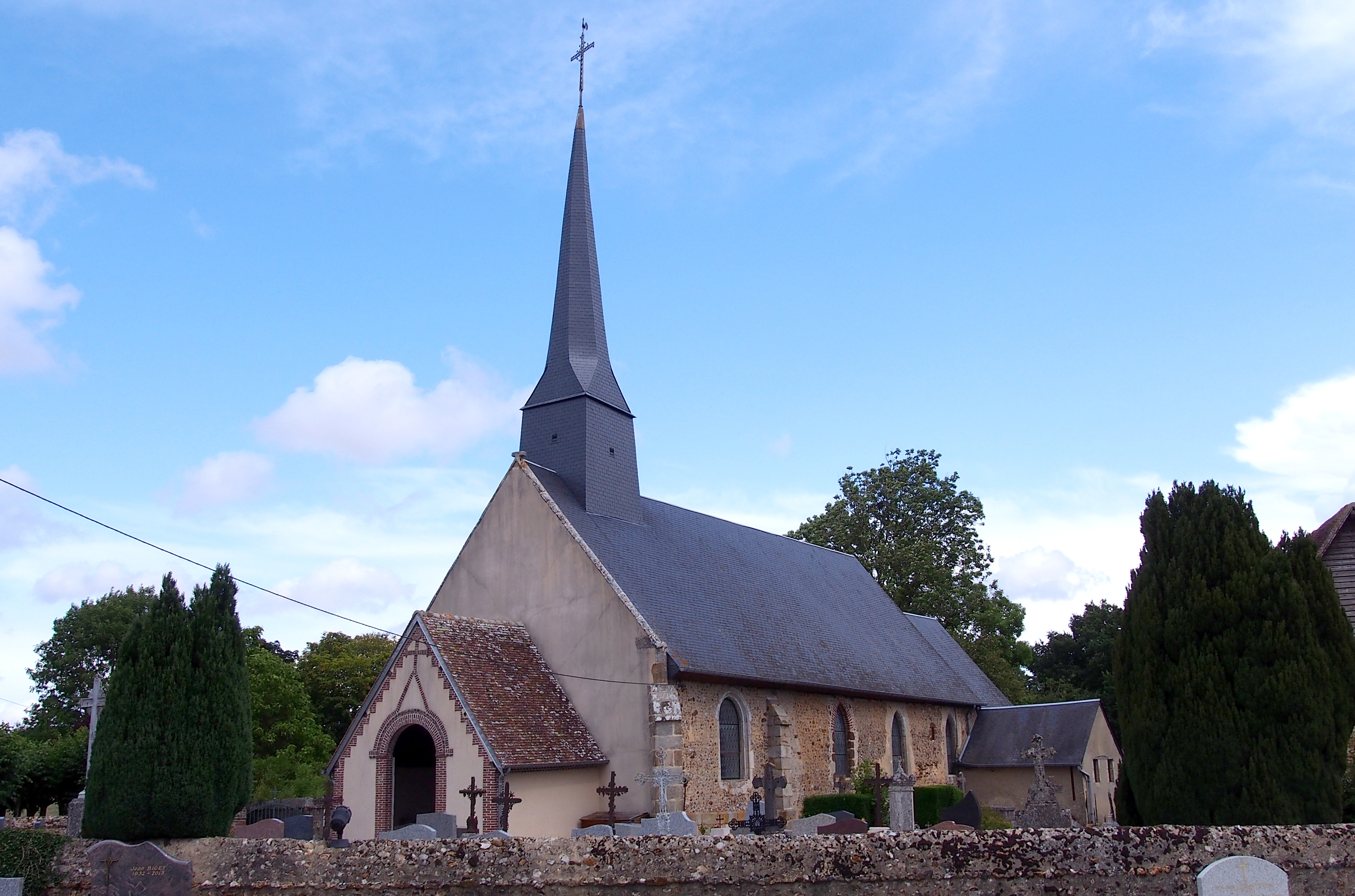
- Location of La Chapelle-Viel
- Location within France Location within Normandy
- Coordinates: 48°42′16″N 0°37′05″E
- Country: France
- Region: Normandy
- Department: Orne
- Arrondissement: Mortagne-au-Perche
- Canton: Tourouvre au Perche
- Intercommunality: Pays de l'Aigle

Government
  - Mayor (2020–2026): Marc Gegu
- Area^{1}: 11.79 km^{2} (4.55 sq mi)
- Elevation: 275 m (902 ft)
- Highest elevation: 274 m (899 ft)
- Lowest elevation: 209 m (686 ft)
- Population (2023): 289
  - Density: 24.5/km^{2} (63.5/sq mi)
- Time zone: UTC+01:00 (CET)
  - Summer (DST): UTC+02:00 (CEST)
- INSEE/Postal code: 61100 /61270
- ^{1} French Land Register data, which excludes lakes, ponds, glaciers > 1 km^{2} (0.386 sq mi or 247 acres) and river estuaries.

La Chapelle-Viel (French pronunciation: [la ʃapɛl vjɛl]) is a commune in the Orne department in north-western France.

== Geography ==
The commune is made up of the following collection of villages and hamlets, Le Fay de la Lande, Le Nouveau Monde, La Brardiére, Les Puisards, Le Fay, La Charpenterie, La Thiaudrie, Villeplée, La Chapelle-Viel and La Rivière.

A river, the Iton flows through the commune.

== See also ==
- Communes of the Orne department
