= Feings, Orne =

Feings
- Commune
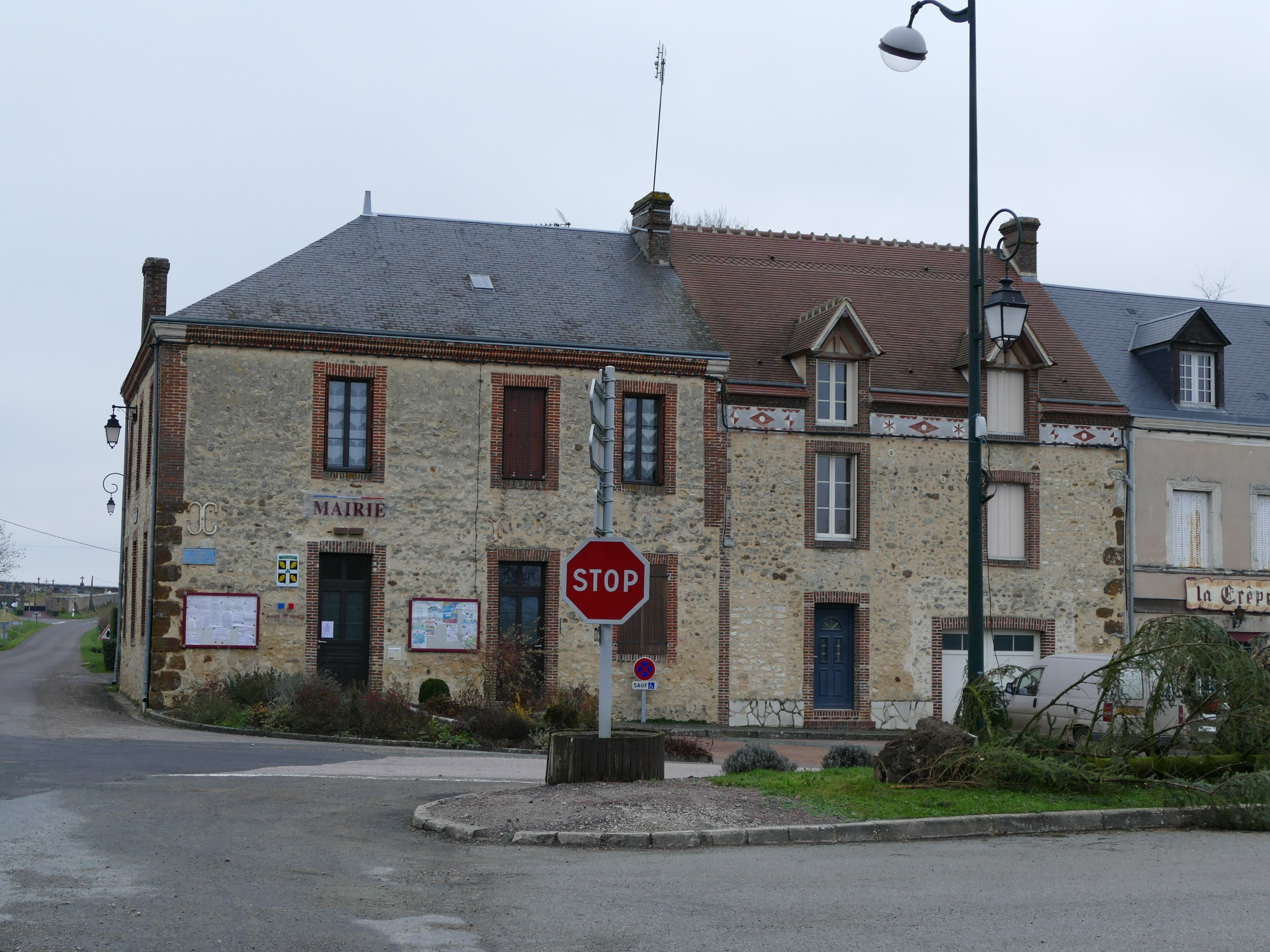
- The town hall in Feings
- Location of Feings
- Location within France Location within Normandy
- Coordinates: 48°32′48″N 0°38′04″E
- Country: France
- Region: Normandy
- Department: Orne
- Arrondissement: Mortagne-au-Perche
- Canton: Mortagne-au-Perche
- Intercommunality: Pays de Mortagne au Perche

Government
  - Mayor (2020–2026): Lydia Bussy-Boiteux
- Area^{1}: 20.24 km^{2} (7.81 sq mi)
- Elevation: 200 m (660 ft)
- Highest elevation: 261 m (856 ft)
- Lowest elevation: 167 m (548 ft)
- Population (2023): 194
  - Density: 9.58/km^{2} (24.8/sq mi)
- Time zone: UTC+01:00 (CET)
  - Summer (DST): UTC+02:00 (CEST)
- INSEE/Postal code: 61160 /61400
- ^{1} French Land Register data, which excludes lakes, ponds, glaciers > 1 km^{2} (0.386 sq mi or 247 acres) and river estuaries.

Feings (French pronunciation: [fɛ̃]) is a commune in the Orne department in north-western France.

== Geography ==
Feings is made up of the following collection of villages and hamlets, Le Boulay aux Alouettes, Les Boulais, L'hôtel Cocu, La Souricière, La Sauvagère, La Bigotière, Le Grand Boulay and Feings.

Feings along with the communes of Tourouvre au Perche, Longny les Villages, Le Mage, Moutiers-au-Perche and Charencey shares part of the Forets, etangs et tourbieres du Haut-Perche a Natura 2000 conservation site. The site measures 3670 hectares and is home to fifteen species protected Flora and Fauna.

In addition the Commune along with another 70 communes shares part of a 47,681 hectare, Natura 2000 conservation area, called the Forêts et étangs du Perche.

Two rivers La Vilette and La Commeauche flow through the commune.

== Points of Interest ==
- La Tourbière de Commeauche is a nature reserve that features a preserved peat bog in a clearing in the Réno-Valdieu forest.
- Ferme pédagogique de Feings is a children's educational farm located within the commune.

=== National heritage sites ===
- Ancienne chartreuse du Val-Dieu is a former Charterhouse that was listed as a Monument historique in 1997.

== See also ==
- Communes of the Orne department
