= Moutiers-au-Perche =

- Commune
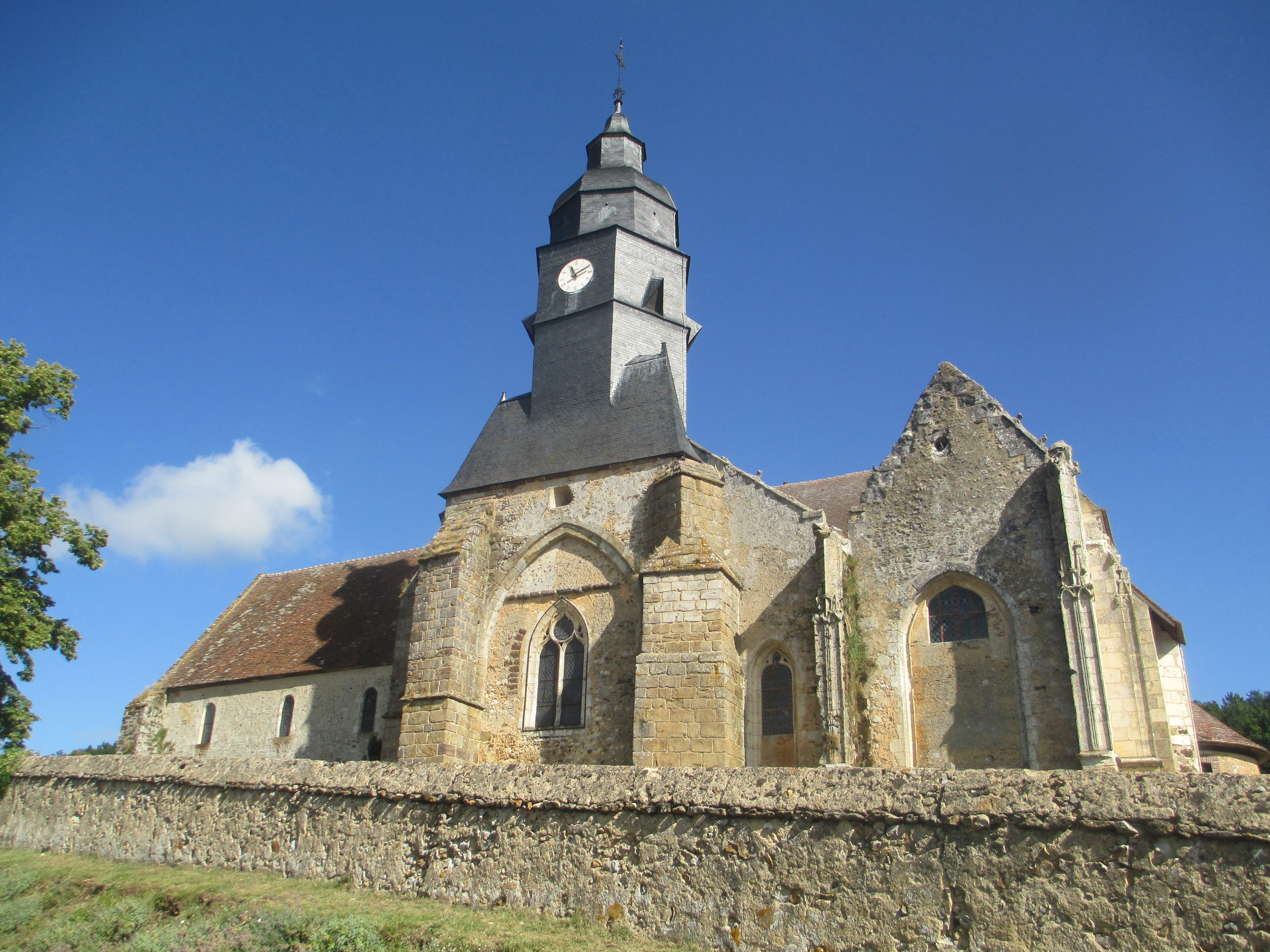
- The church in Moutiers-au-Perche
- Location of Moutiers-au-Perche
- Location within France Location within Normandy
- Coordinates: 48°28′41″N 0°50′52″E
- Country: France
- Region: Normandy
- Department: Orne
- Arrondissement: Mortagne-au-Perche
- Canton: Bretoncelles
- Intercommunality: CC Cœur du Perche

Government
  - Mayor (2020–2026): Pascal Bouvier
- Area^{1}: 33.61 km^{2} (12.98 sq mi)
- Elevation: 159 m (522 ft)
- Highest elevation: 237 m (778 ft)
- Lowest elevation: 143 m (469 ft)
- Population (2023): 366
  - Density: 10.9/km^{2} (28.2/sq mi)
- Time zone: UTC+01:00 (CET)
  - Summer (DST): UTC+02:00 (CEST)
- INSEE/Postal code: 61300 /61110
- ^{1} French Land Register data, which excludes lakes, ponds, glaciers > 1 km^{2} (0.386 sq mi or 247 acres) and river estuaries.

Moutiers-au-Perche (French pronunciation: [mutje o pɛʁʃ]) is a commune in the Orne department in north-western France.

== Geography ==
Moutiers-au-Perche is made up of the following collection of villages and hamlets, La Sibotière, La Badinière, Culoiseau, Moutiers-au-Perche, Le Bois au Large and Le Libérot.

The commune is made up of the following collection of villages and hamlets, La Sibotière, La Badinière, Culoiseau, Moutiers-au-Perche, Le Bois au Large and Le Libérot.

Moutiers-au-Perche along with the communes of Feings, Longny les Villages, Le Mage, Tourouvre au Perche and Charencey shares part of the Forets, etangs et tourbieres du Haut-Perche a Natura 2000 conservation site. The site measures 3670 hectares and is home to fifteen species protected Flora and Fauna.

In addition the Commune along with another 70 communes shares part of a 47,681 hectare, Natura 2000 conservation area, called the Forêts et étangs du Perche.

A river, La Corbionne, flows through the commune.

== Points of interest ==
=== National heritage sites ===
- Notre-Dame-du-Mont-Harou an eleventh century church, that was registered as a Monument historique in 1941.

== See also ==
- Communes of the Orne department
