= Le Pas-Saint-l'Homer =

- Commune
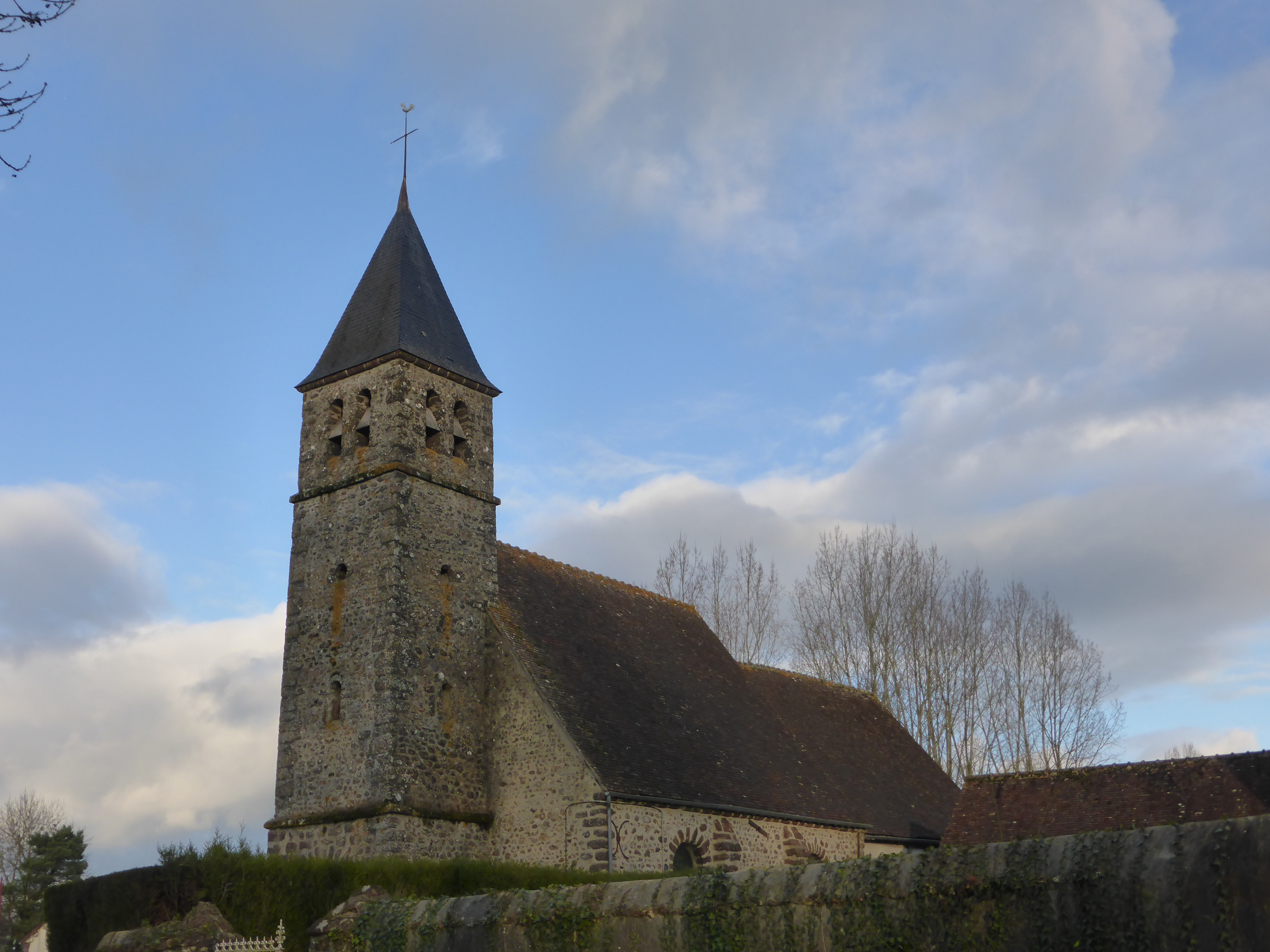
- The church in Le Pas-Saint-l'Homer
- Location of Le Pas-Saint-l'Homer
- Location within France Location within Normandy
- Coordinates: 48°29′49″N 0°56′02″E
- Country: France
- Region: Normandy
- Department: Orne
- Arrondissement: Mortagne-au-Perche
- Canton: Tourouvre au Perche
- Intercommunality: Hauts du Perche

Government
  - Mayor (2020–2026): Pascal Coudray
- Area^{1}: 9.43 km^{2} (3.64 sq mi)
- Highest elevation: 231 m (758 ft)
- Lowest elevation: 196 m (643 ft)
- Population (2023): 129
  - Density: 13.7/km^{2} (35.4/sq mi)
- Time zone: UTC+01:00 (CET)
  - Summer (DST): UTC+02:00 (CEST)
- INSEE/Postal code: 61323 /61290
- ^{1} French Land Register data, which excludes lakes, ponds, glaciers > 1 km^{2} (0.386 sq mi or 247 acres) and river estuaries.

Le Pas-Saint-l'Homer is a commune in the Orne department in north-western France.

== Geography ==
The commune is made up of the following collection of villages and hamlets, La Matinière, Les Trois Croix, Le Pas-Saint-l'Homer and La Gâtine.

La Donnette river flows through the commune.

== See also ==
- Communes of the Orne department
