= Le Mage, Orne =

Le Mage
- Commune
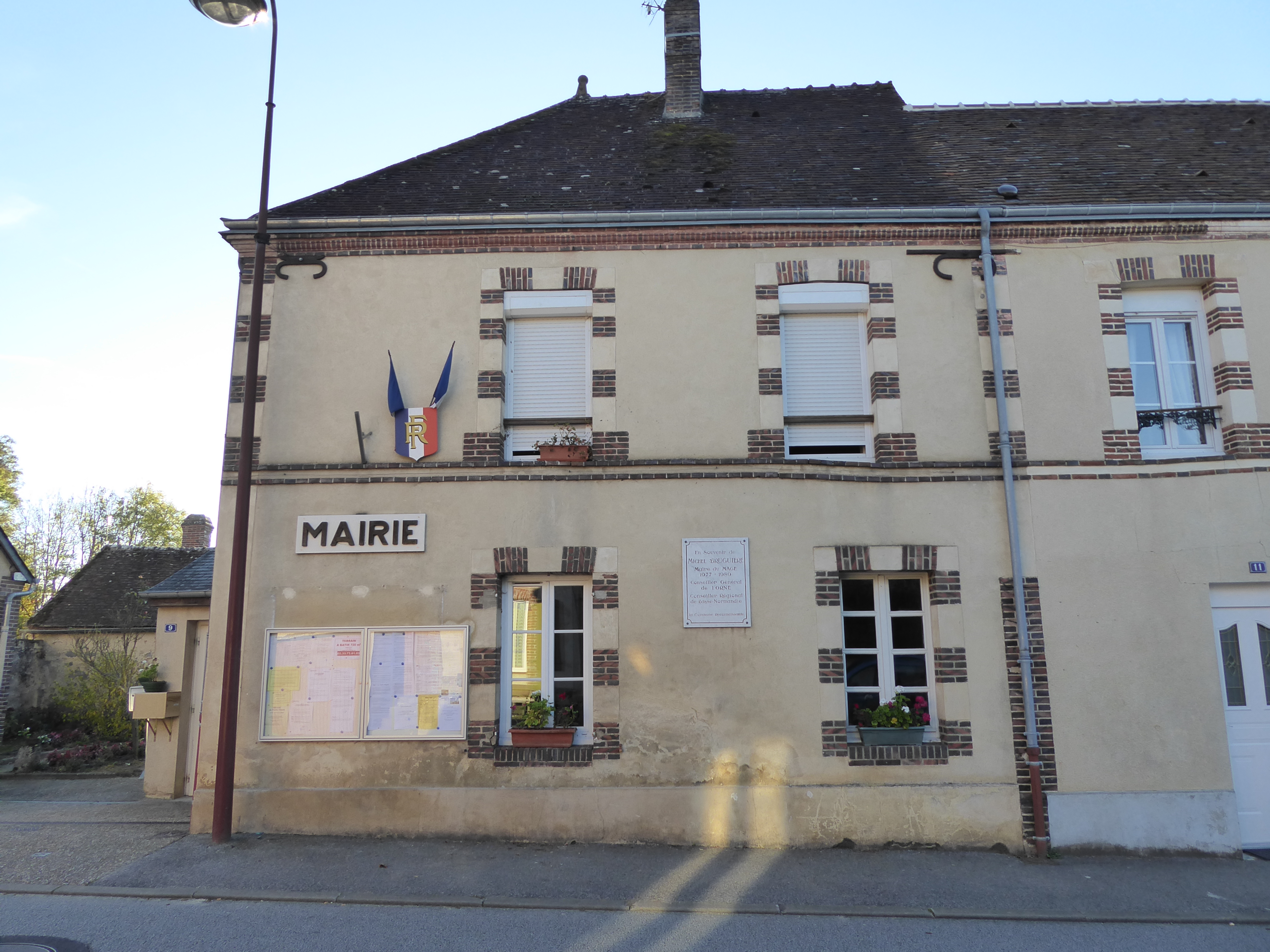
- The town hall in Le Mage
- Location of Le Mage
- Location within France Location within Normandy
- Coordinates: 48°30′37″N 0°48′15″E
- Country: France
- Region: Normandy
- Department: Orne
- Arrondissement: Mortagne-au-Perche
- Canton: Tourouvre au Perche
- Intercommunality: Hauts du Perche

Government
  - Mayor (2020–2026): Bernadette Édou
- Area^{1}: 25.34 km^{2} (9.78 sq mi)
- Elevation: 184 m (604 ft)
- Highest elevation: 246 m (807 ft)
- Lowest elevation: 158 m (518 ft)
- Population (2023): 231
  - Density: 9.12/km^{2} (23.6/sq mi)
- Time zone: UTC+01:00 (CET)
  - Summer (DST): UTC+02:00 (CEST)
- INSEE/Postal code: 61242 /61290
- ^{1} French Land Register data, which excludes lakes, ponds, glaciers > 1 km^{2} (0.386 sq mi or 247 acres) and river estuaries.

Le Mage (French pronunciation: [lə maʒ]) is a commune in the Orne department in north-western France.

== Geography ==
The commune is made up of the following collection of villages and hamlets, La Douvellerie, Volizé, Le Mage, Les Haies Quartier and Le Pont Riboult.

Le Mage along with the communes of Feings, Longny les Villages, Tourouvre au Perche, Moutiers-au-Perche and Charencey shares part of the Forets, etangs et tourbieres du Haut-Perche a Natura 2000 conservation site. The site measures 3670 hectares and is home to fifteen species protected Flora and Fauna.

In addition the Commune along with another 70 communes shares part of a 47,681 hectare, Natura 2000 conservation area, called the Forêts et étangs du Perche.

A river, La Corbionne, flows through the commune. IN addition two streams also traverse the commune, Ruisseau de Saint-Laurent and Ruisseau de Breffin.

== Points of interest ==
=== National heritage sites ===
- Château du Feillet a seventeenth century castle that was registered as a Monument historique in 1981.

== See also ==
- Communes of the Orne department
