= Bulletin de la Société de Linguistique de Paris =

- Discipline: Linguistics
- Language: French

Publication details
- History: 1869–present
- Publisher: Société de Linguistique de Paris
- Frequency: Annually

Standard abbreviations
- ISO 4: Bull. Soc. Linguist. Paris

Indexing
- ISSN: 0037-9069 (print); 1783-1385 (web)

The Bulletin de la Société de Linguistique de Paris (abbr. BSL or BSLP) is an academic journal published by the Société de Linguistique de Paris since 1869.

== The journal ==
Published annually, the journal contains two separate volumes: one of articles, and one dedicated to the review of books recently published in linguistics.

The journal's coverage includes most traditional subdisciplines within linguistics: historical linguistics (with a strong tradition of Indo-European studies and comparative grammar, but also studies of other families); linguistic typology; theoretical and descriptive linguistics; history of linguistics; natural language processing; language acquisition, and so forth.

== Related series ==
- Mémoires de la Société de Linguistique de Paris (list of publications)
- Collection linguistique de la Société de Linguistique de Paris (list of publications)
