= Les Menus =

- Commune
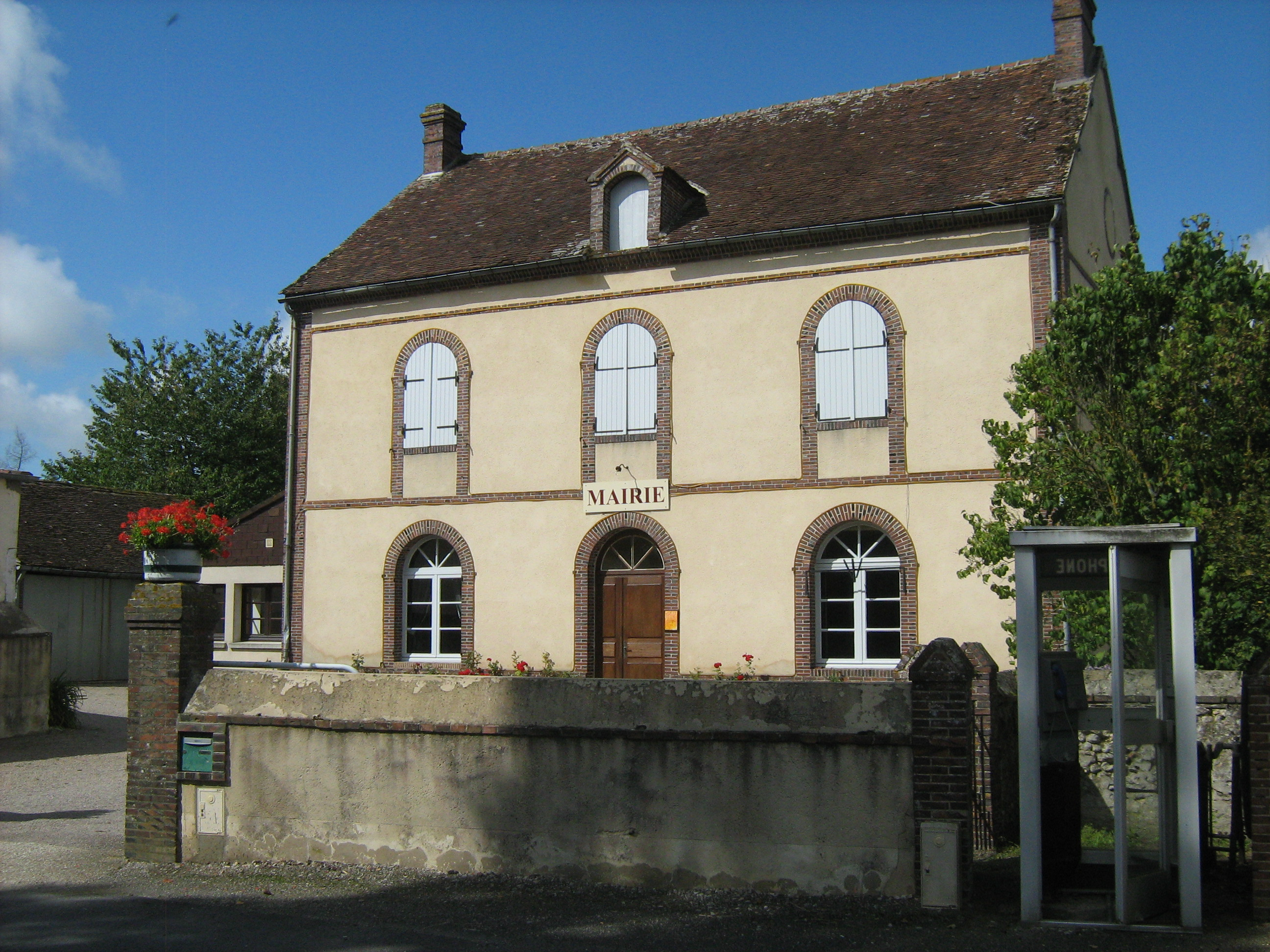
- The town hall in Les Menus
- Location of Les Menus
- Location within France Location within Normandy
- Coordinates: 48°31′30″N 0°56′06″E
- Country: France
- Region: Normandy
- Department: Orne
- Arrondissement: Mortagne-au-Perche
- Canton: Tourouvre au Perche
- Intercommunality: Hauts du Perche

Government
  - Mayor (2020–2026): Denis Guillet
- Area^{1}: 11.81 km^{2} (4.56 sq mi)
- Elevation: 200 m (660 ft)
- Highest elevation: 229 m (751 ft)
- Lowest elevation: 198 m (650 ft)
- Population (2023): 244
  - Density: 20.7/km^{2} (53.5/sq mi)
- Time zone: UTC+01:00 (CET)
  - Summer (DST): UTC+02:00 (CEST)
- INSEE/Postal code: 61274 /61290
- ^{1} French Land Register data, which excludes lakes, ponds, glaciers > 1 km^{2} (0.386 sq mi or 247 acres) and river estuaries.

Les Menus (French pronunciation: [le məny]) is a commune in the Orne department in north-western France.

== Geography ==
Les Menus is made up of the following collection of villages and hamlets, Les Hayes, Le Grand Boulay, Les Menus, La Charbonnière, Les Mains Fermés and Les Loges.

The river Eure flows through the commune.

== See also ==
- Communes of the Orne department
