= Hyacinthe de Charencey =

French philologist

- Coat of arms of the Gouhier de Petiteville family
- Born: Charles-Félix-Hyacinthe Gouhier; 8 November 1832; Paris
- Died: March 12, 1916 (aged 83); Saint-Maurice-lès-Charencey
- Occupation: philologist
- Board member of: Société de Linguistique de Paris

Charles-Félix-Hyacinthe Gouhier, comte de Charencey (November 8, 1832 in Paris – March 12, 1916 at the Château of Champ-Thierry in Saint-Maurice-lès-Charencey), was a French philologist.

A member of an Old Norman family, Charencey divided his life between politics and scholarship. With passion for his chosen field of philology, he largely remained in his own library, from which his own works emerged and from where he died of pulmonary embolism due to his sedentary profession. He was elected as a member of the American Philosophical Society in 1872.

He was the founder of the Philological Society and the society of Saint-Jérôme, which published grammars, catechisms, and dictionaries for missionaries. In 1888, he became president of the Société de Linguistique de Paris.

He was most interested in American languages and the Basque language, for which he wrote a dictionary, which was never printed. He focused above all on the practical description of little-known languages, and he was equally interested in mythology, paleography, folklore, and history.
