= Bizou =

- Commune
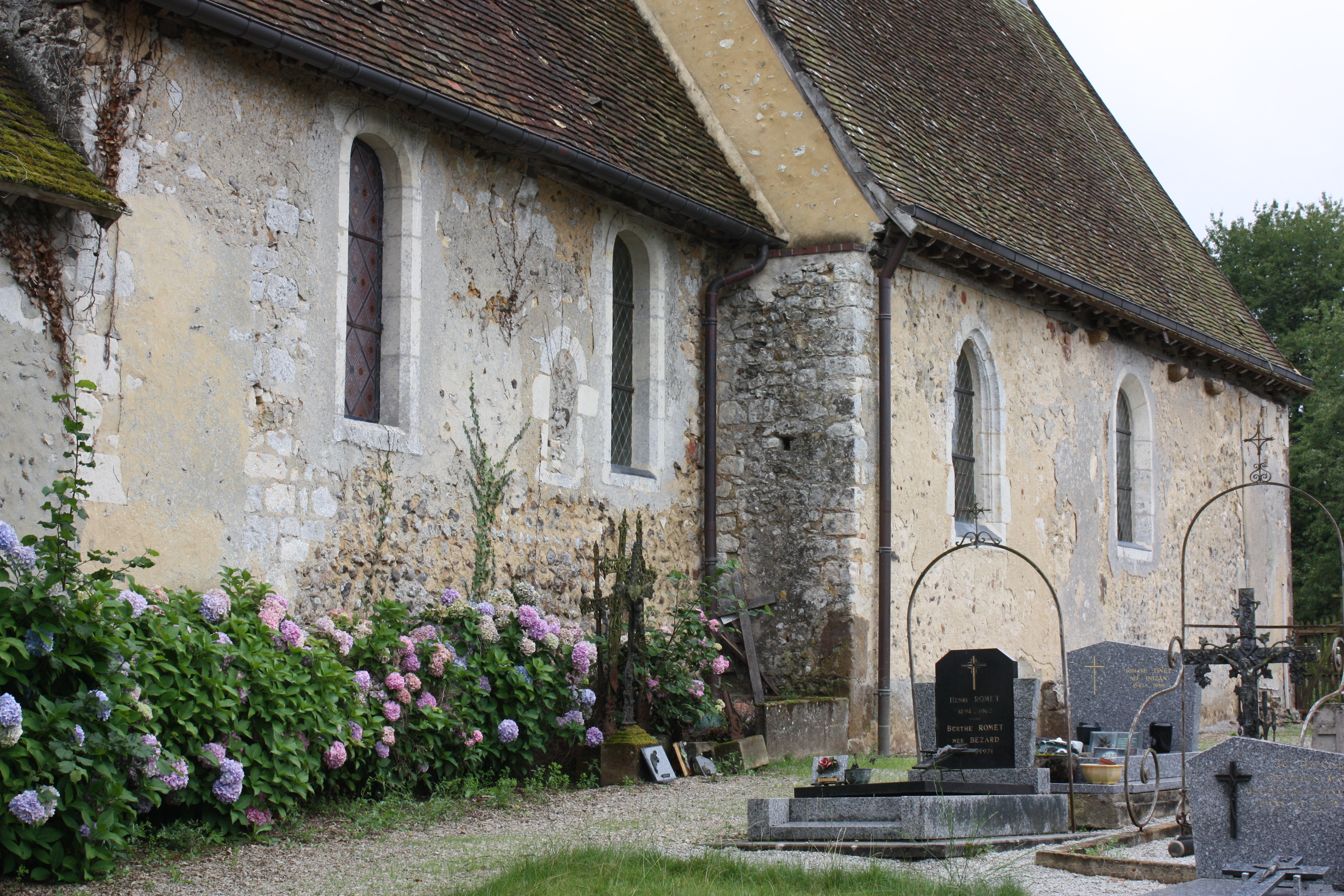
- The church in Bizou
- Location of Bizou
- Location within France Location within Normandy
- Coordinates: 48°29′48″N 0°45′04″E
- Country: France
- Region: Normandy
- Department: Orne
- Arrondissement: Mortagne-au-Perche
- Canton: Tourouvre au Perche

Government
  - Mayor (2020–2026): Philippe Blottière
- Area^{1}: 9.04 km^{2} (3.49 sq mi)
- Elevation: 154 m (505 ft)
- Highest elevation: 251 m (823 ft)
- Lowest elevation: 145 m (476 ft)
- Population (2023): 142
  - Density: 15.7/km^{2} (40.7/sq mi)
- Time zone: UTC+01:00 (CET)
  - Summer (DST): UTC+02:00 (CEST)
- INSEE/Postal code: 61046 /61290
- ^{1} French Land Register data, which excludes lakes, ponds, glaciers > 1 km^{2} (0.386 sq mi or 247 acres) and river estuaries.

Bizou (French pronunciation: [bizu]) is a commune in the Orne department in northwestern France.

== Geography ==
The commune is made up of the following collection of villages and hamlets, Bizou and La Moisière.

The Commune along with another 70 communes shares part of a 47,681 hectare, Natura 2000 conservation area, called the Forêts et étangs du Perche.

A river, La Jambée, flows through the commune.

== Population ==
Historical population
Year	Pop.	±% p.a.
1968	128	—
1975	119	−1.04%
1982	108	−1.38%
1990	134	+2.73%
1999	116	−1.59%
2007	126	+1.04%
2012	109	−2.86%
2017	130	+3.59%
2023	142	+1.48%
Source: INSEE

== See also ==
- Communes of the Orne department
