= Les Genettes =

- Commune
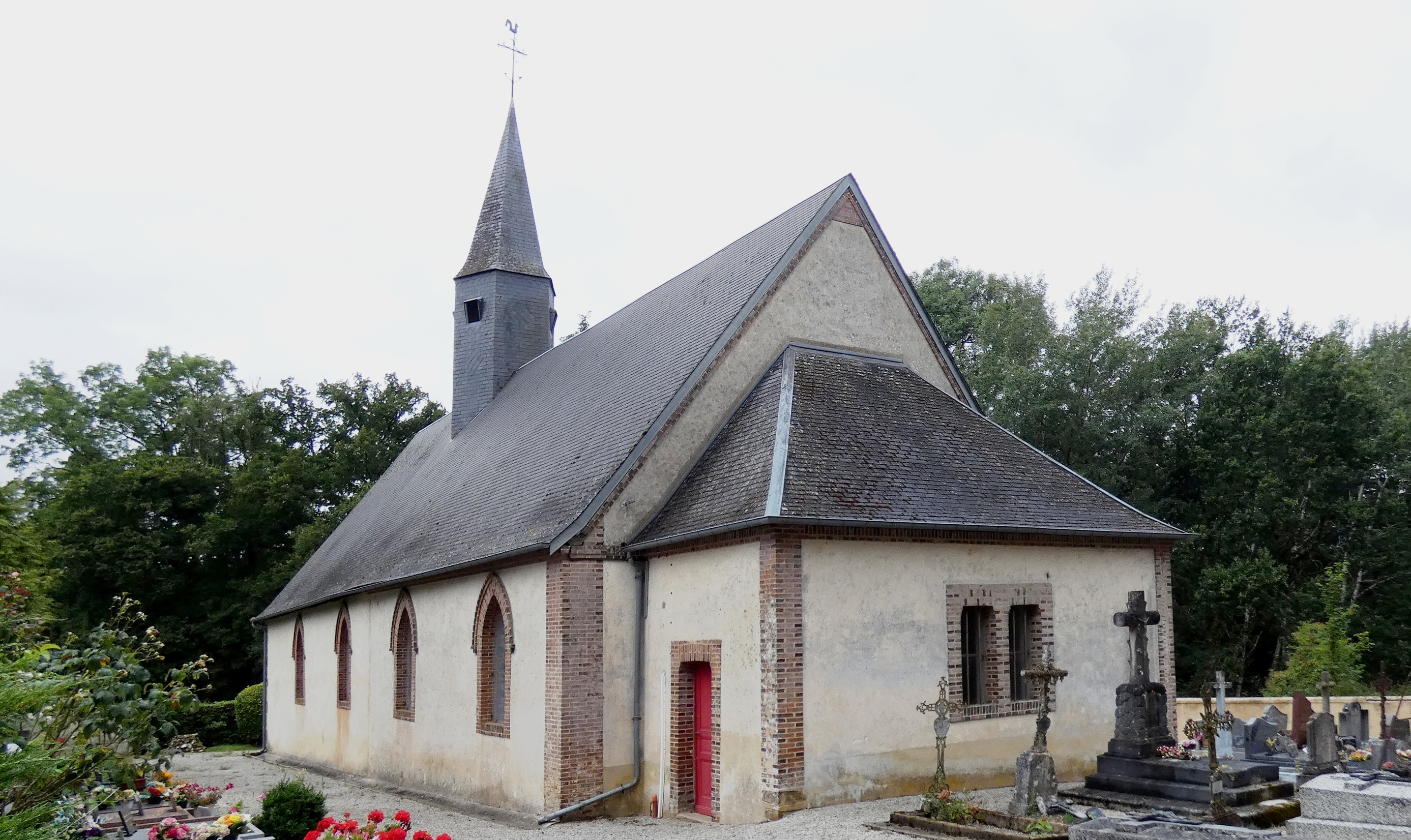

- Coat of arms
- Location of Les Genettes
- Location within France Location within Normandy
- Coordinates: 48°39′55″N 0°34′08″E
- Country: France
- Region: Normandy
- Department: Orne
- Arrondissement: Mortagne-au-Perche
- Canton: Tourouvre au Perche
- Intercommunality: Pays de L'Aigle

Government
  - Mayor (2020–2026): Gilbert Matelot
- Area^{1}: 6.54 km^{2} (2.53 sq mi)
- Elevation: 255 m (837 ft)
- Highest elevation: 283 m (928 ft)
- Lowest elevation: 219 m (719 ft)
- Population (2023): 160
  - Density: 24/km^{2} (63/sq mi)
- Time zone: UTC+01:00 (CET)
  - Summer (DST): UTC+02:00 (CEST)
- INSEE/Postal code: 61187 /61270
- ^{1} French Land Register data, which excludes lakes, ponds, glaciers > 1 km^{2} (0.386 sq mi or 247 acres) and river estuaries.

Les Genettes (French pronunciation: [le ʒənɛt]) is a commune in the Orne department in north-western France.

== Geography ==
Les Genettes is made up of the following collection of villages and hamlets, La Houssière, La Piquenoterie, Les Genettes, La Poulevallerie, Les Côtes and Les Barres.

The Commune along with another 70 communes shares part of a 47,681 hectare, Natura 2000 conservation area, called the Forêts et étangs du Perche.

Two rivers, the Iton and L'Itonne flow through the commune.

== Notable people ==
- Loïk Le Floch-Prigent (born 1943), was CEO of Elf Aquitaine between July 1989 and 1993 during which time he purchased the Château des Genettes, which was later questioned as part of the Elf Aquitaine fraud scandal investigation.

== See also ==
- Communes of the Orne department
