= Les Aspres =

- Commune
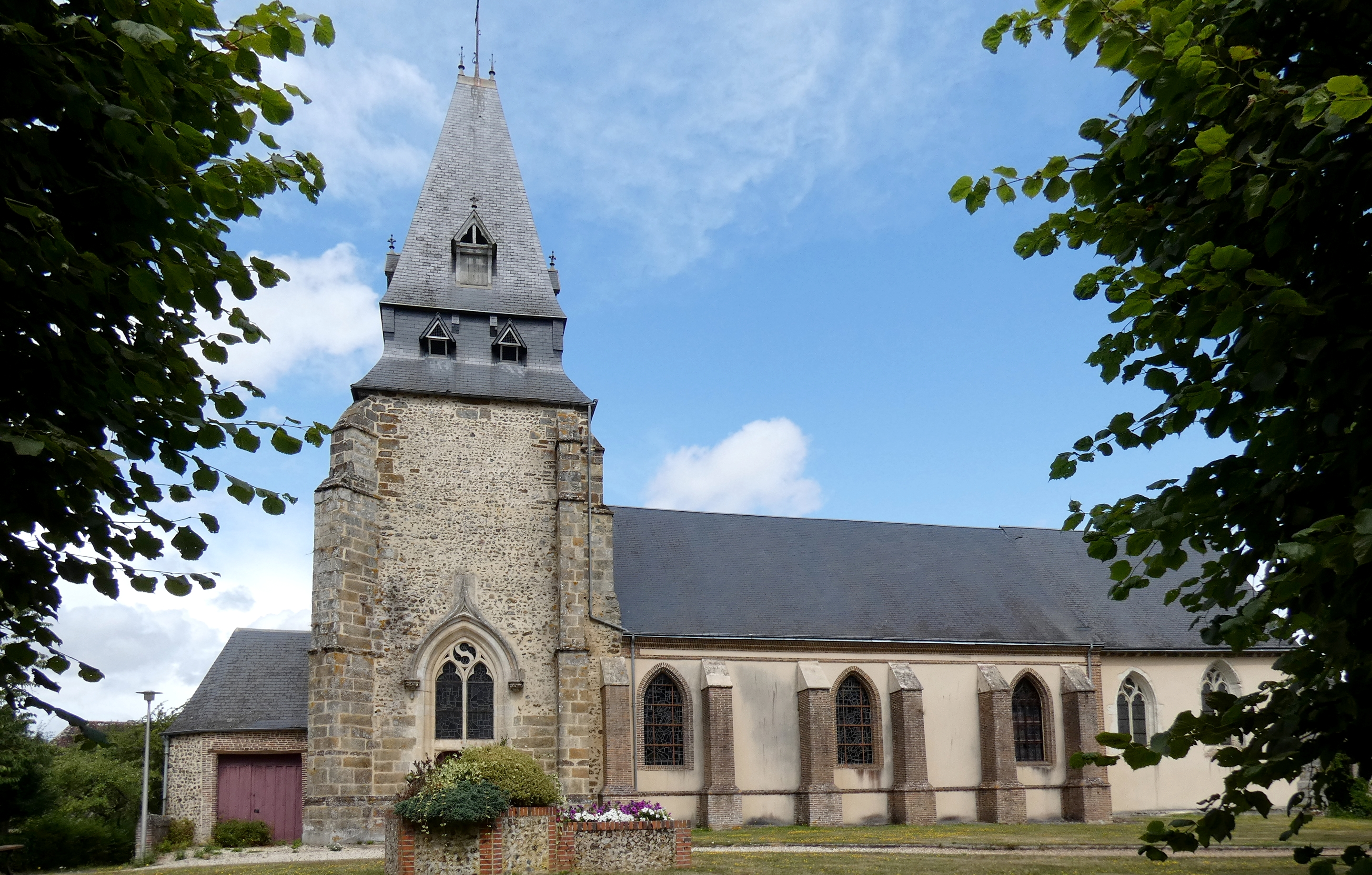

- Coat of arms
- Location of Les Aspres
- Location within France Location within Normandy
- Coordinates: 48°41′28″N 0°36′07″E
- Country: France
- Region: Normandy
- Department: Orne
- Arrondissement: Mortagne-au-Perche
- Canton: Tourouvre au Perche

Government
  - Mayor (2020–2026): Delphine Prieur
- Area^{1}: 23.21 km^{2} (8.96 sq mi)
- Elevation: 230 m (750 ft)
- Highest elevation: 280 m (920 ft)
- Lowest elevation: 209 m (686 ft)
- Population (2023): 625
  - Density: 26.9/km^{2} (69.7/sq mi)
- Time zone: UTC+01:00 (CET)
  - Summer (DST): UTC+02:00 (CEST)
- INSEE/Postal code: 61422 /61270
- ^{1} French Land Register data, which excludes lakes, ponds, glaciers > 1 km^{2} (0.386 sq mi or 247 acres) and river estuaries.

Les Aspres (French pronunciation: [le.z‿a(s)pʁ]) is a commune in the Orne department in northwestern France. It was created in 1959 by the merger of the former communes Saint-Martin-d'Aspres and Notre-Dame-d'Aspres.

== Geography ==
The commune is made up of the following collection of villages and hamlets, Percher, Le Marga, Sur le Bois, Les Aspres, Le Goutier, Les Bissons, La Futelaye, Les Minières, Le Tremblai and Le Châtelet.

The Commune along with another 70 communes shares part of a 47,681 hectare, Natura 2000 conservation area, called the Forêts et étangs du Perche.

Two rivers, the Iton and Le Vivier Tranchant flow through the commune.

== Population ==
Historical population
Year	Pop.	±% p.a.
1968	536	—
1975	546	+0.26%
1982	581	+0.89%
1990	574	−0.15%
1999	633	+1.09%
2007	676	+0.82%
2012	700	+0.70%
2017	631	−2.05%
2023	625	−0.16%
Source: INSEE

== See also ==
- Communes of the Orne department
