= Château de Passy-les-Tours =

Ruined castle in Bourgogne-Franche-Comté, France

Coordinates: 47°12′55″N 3°04′33″E

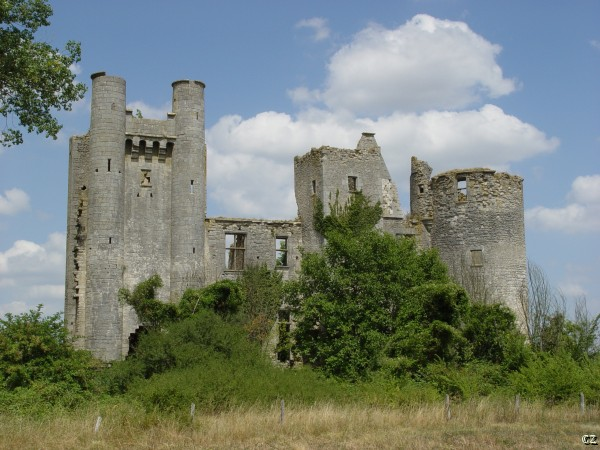

The Château de Passy-les-Tours is a ruined castle in the commune of Varennes-lès-Narcy in the Nièvre département of France.

== History ==
With an oblong plan about 50 m long flanked with four round towers in the corners, the castle was built at the end of the 14th century by Jean de Chevenon, then counsellor to King Charles VI of France. The 25 m high keep dominates the vaulted entrance. Its architecture was inspired by the Château de Vincennes in Paris and its imposing towers (tours) give their name to the village of Passy-les-Tours.

During the Hundred Years' War, from 1422, it was occupied by captain Perrinet Gressard who opposed Joan of Arc at the siege of La Charité-sur-Loire in 1429.

Badly damaged during the Wars of Religion, in 1782 the castle became the property of the marquis de Vergennes, politician and diplomat, who did not restore it. Neither did successive owners. On the contrary, the castle's stones were used in other constructions.

The castle is privately owned. It has been listed since 1927 as a monument historique by the French Ministry of Culture.

== See also ==
- List of castles in France
