= Châtel-Gérard =

- Commune
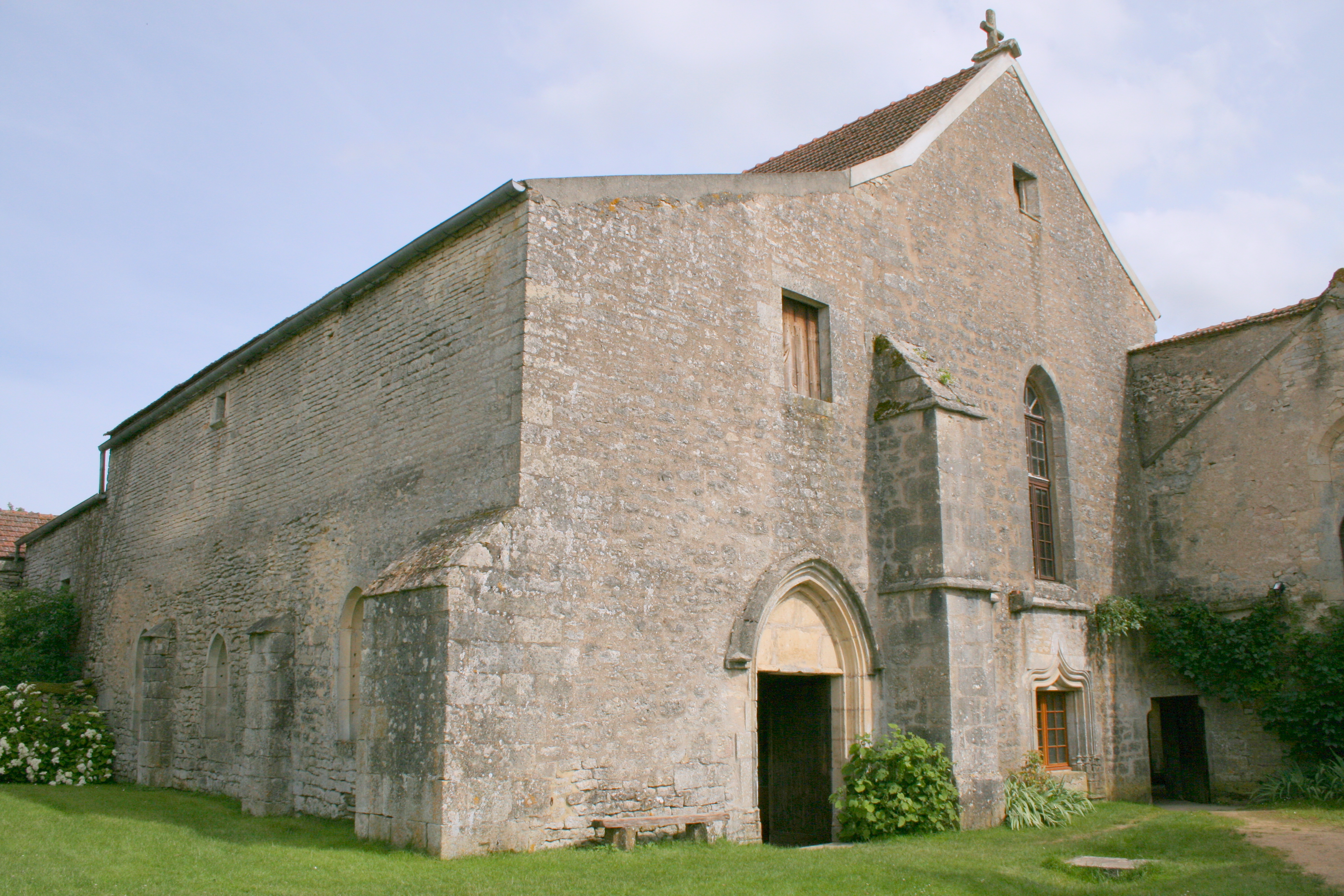
- The Vausse priory in Châtel-Gérard
- Location of Châtel-Gérard
- Location within France Location within Bourgogne-Franche-Comté
- Coordinates: 47°37′59″N 4°05′50″E
- Country: France
- Region: Bourgogne-Franche-Comté
- Department: Yonne
- Arrondissement: Avallon
- Canton: Chablis

Government
  - Mayor (2020–2026): Béatrice Boise
- Area^{1}: 30.67 km^{2} (11.84 sq mi)
- Highest elevation: 363 m (1,191 ft)
- Lowest elevation: 248 m (814 ft)
- Population (2023): 199
  - Density: 6.49/km^{2} (16.8/sq mi)
- Time zone: UTC+01:00 (CET)
  - Summer (DST): UTC+02:00 (CEST)
- INSEE/Postal code: 89092 /89310
- ^{1} French Land Register data, which excludes lakes, ponds, glaciers > 1 km^{2} (0.386 sq mi or 247 acres) and river estuaries.

Châtel-Gérard (French pronunciation: [ʃatɛl ʒeʁaʁ]) is a commune in the Yonne department in Bourgogne-Franche-Comté in north-central France.

== See also ==
- Communes of the Yonne department
