= Longny-au-Perche =

- Part of Longny les Villages
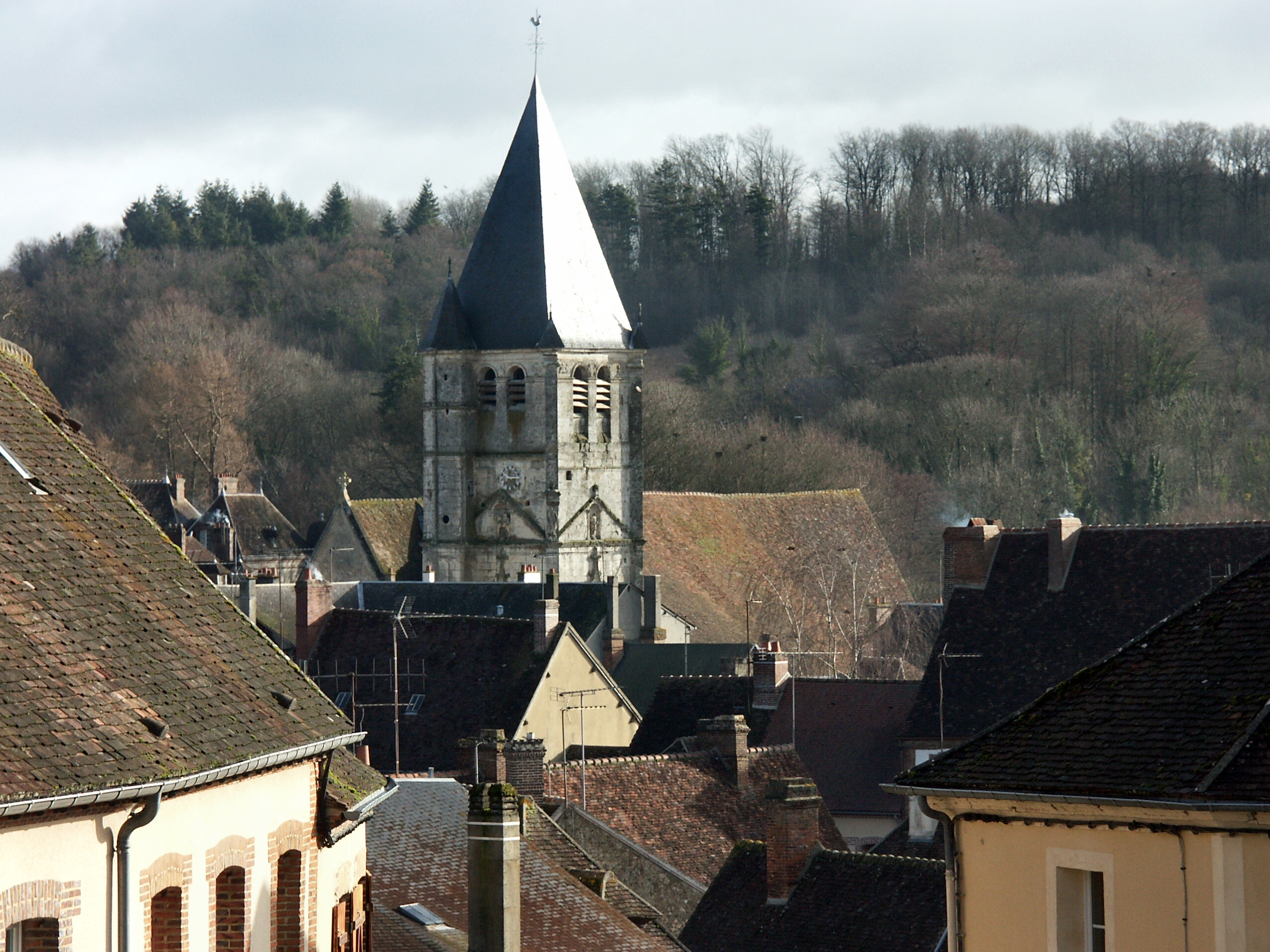
- Longy-au-Perche, looking towards the tower of the church of Saint Martin from the west
- Location of Longny-au-Perche
- Location within France Location within Normandy
- Coordinates: 48°31′52″N 0°45′10″E
- Country: France
- Region: Normandy
- Department: Orne
- Arrondissement: Mortagne-au-Perche
- Canton: Tourouvre
- Commune: Longny les Villages
- Area^{1}: 39.13 km^{2} (15.11 sq mi)
- Elevation: 165 m (541 ft)
- Highest elevation: 242 m (794 ft)
- Lowest elevation: 145 m (476 ft)
- Population (2022): 1,255
  - Density: 32.07/km^{2} (83.07/sq mi)
- Time zone: UTC+01:00 (CET)
  - Summer (DST): UTC+02:00 (CEST)
- Postal code: 61290
- ^{1} French Land Register data, which excludes lakes, ponds, glaciers > 1 km^{2} (0.386 sq mi or 247 acres) and river estuaries.

Longny-au-Perche (French pronunciation: [lɔ̃ɲi o pɛʁʃ]) is a former commune in the Orne department in north-western France. It is classed as a Petites Cités de Caractère. On 1 January 2016, it was merged into the new commune of Longny les Villages.

== Heraldry ==
Arms of Longny-au-Perche	The arms of Longny-au-Perche are blazoned : Quarterly 1&4: Argent, a chevron couped between 3 crosses couped sable; 2: Argent, 3 bars wavy azure; 3: Gules, a lion Or between 3 mallets argent.

== See also ==
- Communes of the Orne department
- Perche
