= Chrétien-Siméon Le Prévost d'Iray =

French writer (1768–1849)

Chrétien-Siméon Le Prévost d’Iray
- Born: 13 June 1768; Irai, France
- Died: 15 September 1849 (aged 81); Irai, France
- Resting place: Irai
- Occupations: Educator, poet, dramatists, vaudevillist

Chrétien-Siméon Le Prévost d’Iray (13 June 1768 – 15 September 1849) was a French poet and writer of comedies and Comédie en vaudevilles. He was also an educator and historian.

A viscount, the son of Jean-Jacques Le Prévost, lord of Iray and Chauvigny, bodyguard of the king's house, and cavalry captain, Chrétien-Siméon Le Prévost d'Iray lost most of his estate during the French Revolution.

After he collaborated with the Journal des dames et des modes and embarked without much success in the theater, he became a professor of history and censor at the Lycée Louis-le-Grand in Paris and general inspector of education.

He was a member of the Académie des Sciences, Arts et Belles-Lettres de Caen and, in 1818, became a member of the Académie des inscriptions et belles-lettres.

== Works ==
Theatre

- 1793: La Clubomanie, comedy in three acts and in verse, Théâtre Molière, 11 July.
- 1795: Maître Adam, menuisier de Nevers, one-act comedy, in prose, mingled with vaudevilles, Théâtre du Vaudeville, 17 June.
- 1797: Les Troubadours, one-act comedy, in prose, mingled with vaudevilles, Théâtre du Vaudeville, 18 March.
- 1797: Alphonse et Léonore ou L'heureux procès, one-act comedy in prose, mingled with ariettes, Théâtre de la rue Feydeau, 29 November Read on line
- 1798: Manlius Torquatus, tragedy in five acts and in verse, Théâtre de l'Odéon, 27 January.
- 1799: Le Quart-d'heure de Rabelais, one-act comedy in prose, mingled with vaudevilles, Théâtre du Vaudeville, 14 January.
- 1799: Aurore de Gusman, one-act opéra comique created at the Théâtre Feydeau 24 October, music by Tarchi.
- 1802: Carlin débutant à Bergame, one-act comedy in prose, mingled with vaudevilles, Théâtre du Vaudeville, 14 July.
- 1804: Jean Lafontaine, one-act comedy, mingled with vaudevilles, Théâtre du Vaudeville, 15 December.

Poetry

- 1824: La Vendée, Poème en six chants dédié à l’Armée Française, libératrice de l’Espagne
- 1826: Poésies fugitives

Other

- 1801: Tableau comparatif de l'histoire ancienne, ouvrage élémentaire à l'usage des écoles publiques
- 1804: Tableau comparatif de l'histoire moderne
- 1827: Souvenirs poétiques

== See also ==
- List of French peerages
- List of French writers
- List of playwrights
- List of poets
