= Canton of Tourouvre au Perche =

Coordinates: 48.59°N 0.65°E

The canton of Tourouvre au Perche (before March 2020: canton of Tourouvre) is an administrative division of the Orne department, northwestern France. Its borders were modified at the French canton reorganisation which came into effect in March 2015. Its seat is in Tourouvre au Perche.

It consists of the following communes:

1. Les Aspres
2. Auguaise
3. Beaulieu
4. Bizou
5. Bonnefoi
6. Bonsmoulins
7. Brethel
8. La Chapelle-Viel
9. Charencey
10. Crulai
11. La Ferrière-au-Doyen
12. Les Genettes
13. L'Hôme-Chamondot
14. Irai
15. Longny les Villages
16. Le Mage
17. Le Ménil-Bérard
18. Les Menus
19. Moulins-la-Marche
20. Le Pas-Saint-l'Homer
21. Saint-Hilaire-sur-Risle
22. Tourouvre au Perche
23. La Ventrouze
