= Mauer =

Mauer is the German word for wall. It may also refer to:

== Places ==
- Mauer, Vienna, a former village of Lower Austria that has been part of Vienna since 1938
- Mauer bei Amstetten, a village in the municipality of Amstetten, in Lower Austria
- Mauer bei Melk, a village in the municipality of Dunkelsteinerwald, in the Mostviertel in Lower Austria
- Mauer (Baden), a village of the Rhein-Neckar-Kreis in Germany

== People ==
- Albert Mauer (1907–1999), former Polish ice hockey player
- Frank Mauer (born 1988), German ice hockey player
- Gary Mauer, American actor
- Jake Mauer (born 1978), former baseball player and baseball manager; also older brother of Joe Mauer
- John Mauer (1901–1978), former college basketball coach for the University of Kentucky and later for the University of Tennessee
- Joe Mauer (born 1983), all-star catcher for the Minnesota Twins (Major League Baseball)
- Ken Mauer (born 1955), NBA referee
- Renata Mauer (born 1969), Polish sports shooter
- Rocco Mauer (born 1988), US rugby player

== Music ==
- Die Chinesische Mauer ("The Chinese Wall"), a 1985 album by Michael Cretu
- Die Mauer ("The Wall"), a 1982 song by the Swedish punk band Ebba Grön

== Other ==
- Berlin Wall (Berliner Mauer), a barrier that divided Berlin from 1961 to 1989
- Mauer 1, a fossilized mandible, type specimen of the Homo heidelbergensis, named after its place of discovery Mauer
- Also used to refer to the Inner German border, mid-1950s–1989

== See also ==
- Maurer, is the German word for bricklayer and a more common surname
- Maur (disambiguation), place and surname
- Auf der Maur, surname
- In der Maur, surname
