= Trizay-lès-Bonneval =

- Commune
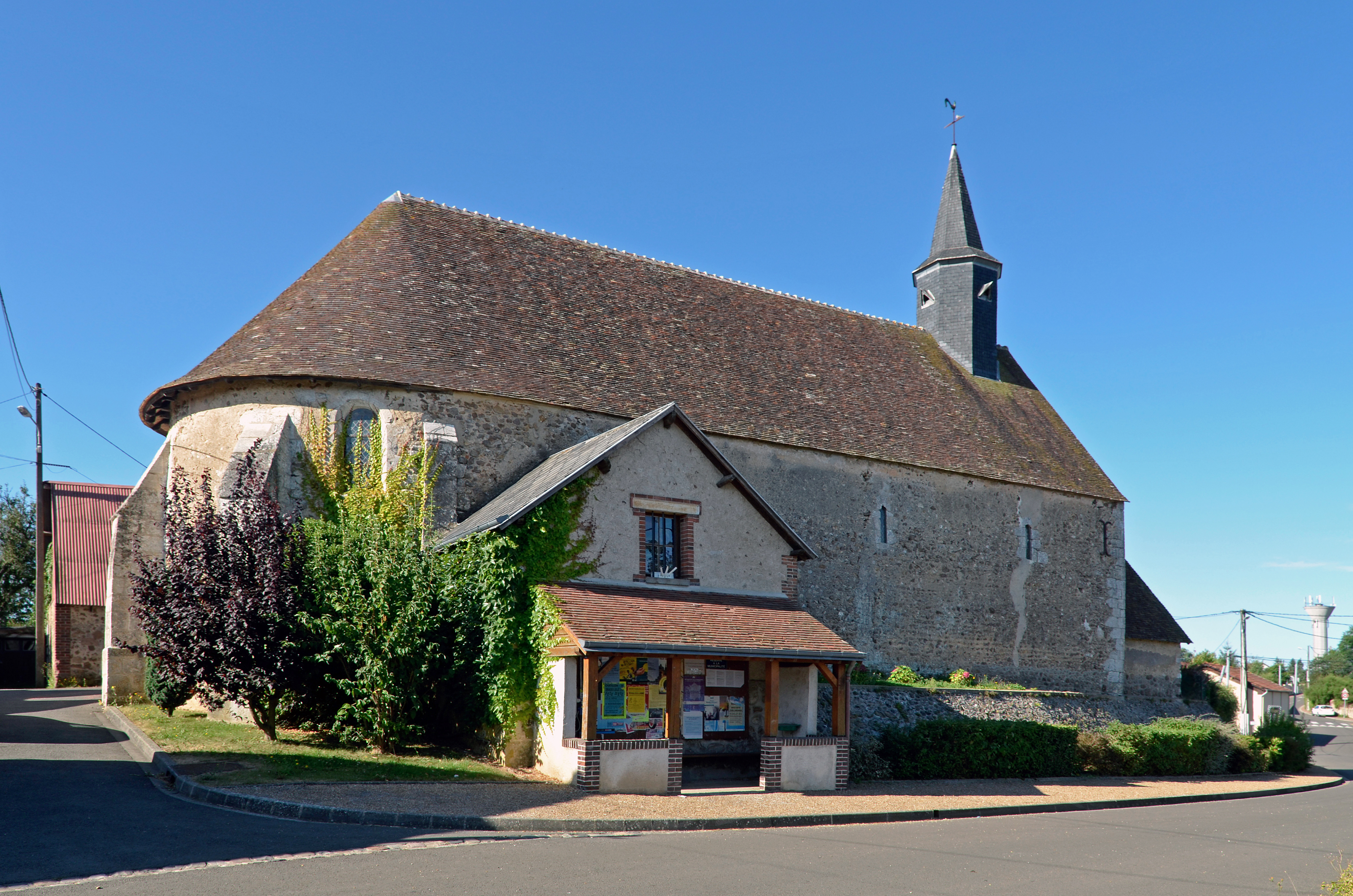
- The church in Trizay-lès-Bonneval

- Coat of arms
- Location of Trizay-lès-Bonneval
- Location within France Location within Centre-Val de Loire
- Coordinates: 48°12′00″N 1°20′07″E
- Country: France
- Region: Centre-Val de Loire
- Department: Eure-et-Loir
- Arrondissement: Châteaudun
- Canton: Châteaudun
- Intercommunality: CC du Bonnevalais

Government
  - Mayor (2020–2026): Michel Girard
- Area^{1}: 9.77 km^{2} (3.77 sq mi)
- Elevation: 140 m (460 ft)
- Highest elevation: 182 m (597 ft)
- Lowest elevation: 123 m (404 ft)
- Population (2023): 323
  - Density: 33.1/km^{2} (85.6/sq mi)
- Time zone: UTC+01:00 (CET)
  - Summer (DST): UTC+02:00 (CEST)
- INSEE/Postal code: 28396 /28800
- ^{1} French Land Register data, which excludes lakes, ponds, glaciers > 1 km^{2} (0.386 sq mi or 247 acres) and river estuaries.

Trizay-lès-Bonneval (French pronunciation: [tʁizɛ lɛ bɔnval], literally Trizay near Bonneval) is a commune in the Eure-et-Loir department and Centre-Val de Loire region of north-central France. It lies 29 km south-south-west of Chartres and some 105 km from Paris.

== Population ==
Historical population
| Year | Pop. | ±% p.a. |
|---|---|---|
| 1968 | 193 | — |
| 1975 | 182 | −0.83% |
| 1982 | 214 | +2.34% |
| 1990 | 251 | +2.01% |
| 1999 | 253 | +0.09% |
| 2007 | 267 | +0.68% |
| 2012 | 325 | +4.01% |
| 2017 | 316 | −0.56% |
| 2023 | 323 | +0.37% |
Source: INSEE

== See also ==
- Communes of the Eure-et-Loir department
