= Pierre-Georges Castex =

French literary scholar (1915–1995)

Pierre-Georges Castex (20 June 1915 at Toulouse – 9 December 1995 at Paris) was a French academic, literary critic and author.

Professor of Modern French Literature at Paris-Sorbonne University from 1956 until 1982, Castex was distinguished by election as a Member of the Académie des Sciences Morales et Politiques in 1974.

== Biography ==
An alumnus of the École normale supérieure (Paris) (1935), agrégé de lettres in 1938 and Doctorate in 1951, he taught at Beauvais in 1938 and Saint-Maur in 1942. In 1946-1947, he was assistant professor at the Sorbonne (building). From 1947 to 1956, he taught at the Charles de Gaulle University – Lille III. From 1956 to 1982, Castex was Professor of modern Literature at the Sorbonne (building) and, since 1974, a member of the Académie des Sciences Morales et Politiques .

He was related to former Senate (France) and Mayor Marc Castex, and married Marie-Madeleine Fargeaud.
