= Margent =

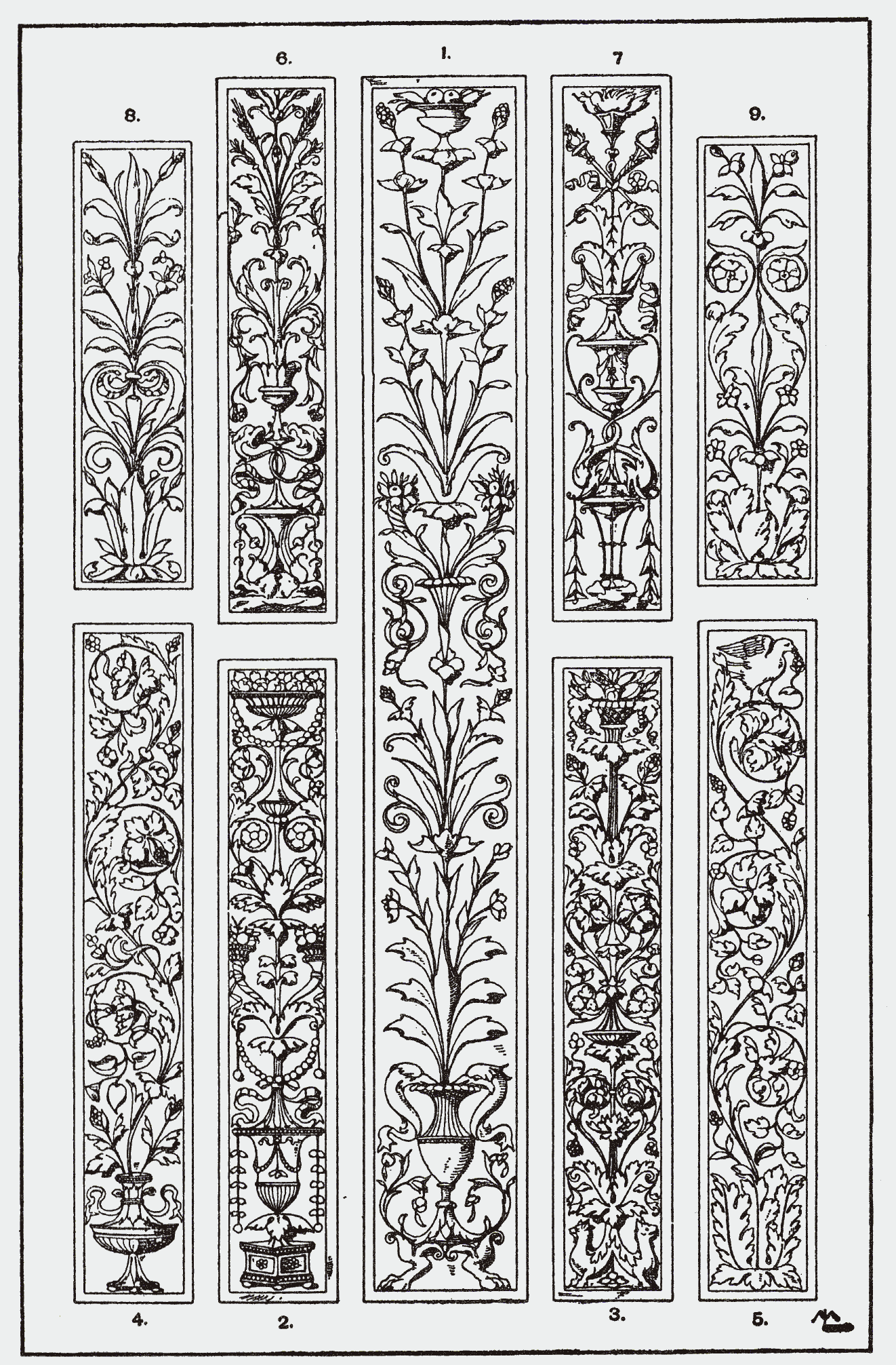
Margent decoration sculpted in plaster from Meyer's Handbook of Ornament

In architecture and furniture design, margent is an ornament consisting of a vertical arrangement of flowers leaves, or hanging vines. It was common in the 16th, 17th and 18th centuries. This motif was developed as a complement to other decorative ornaments, hanging as "drops" at the ends of a festoon or swag. Margent can be used to accentuate the vertical lines of window frames and centered in ornamental panels.

== Gallery ==
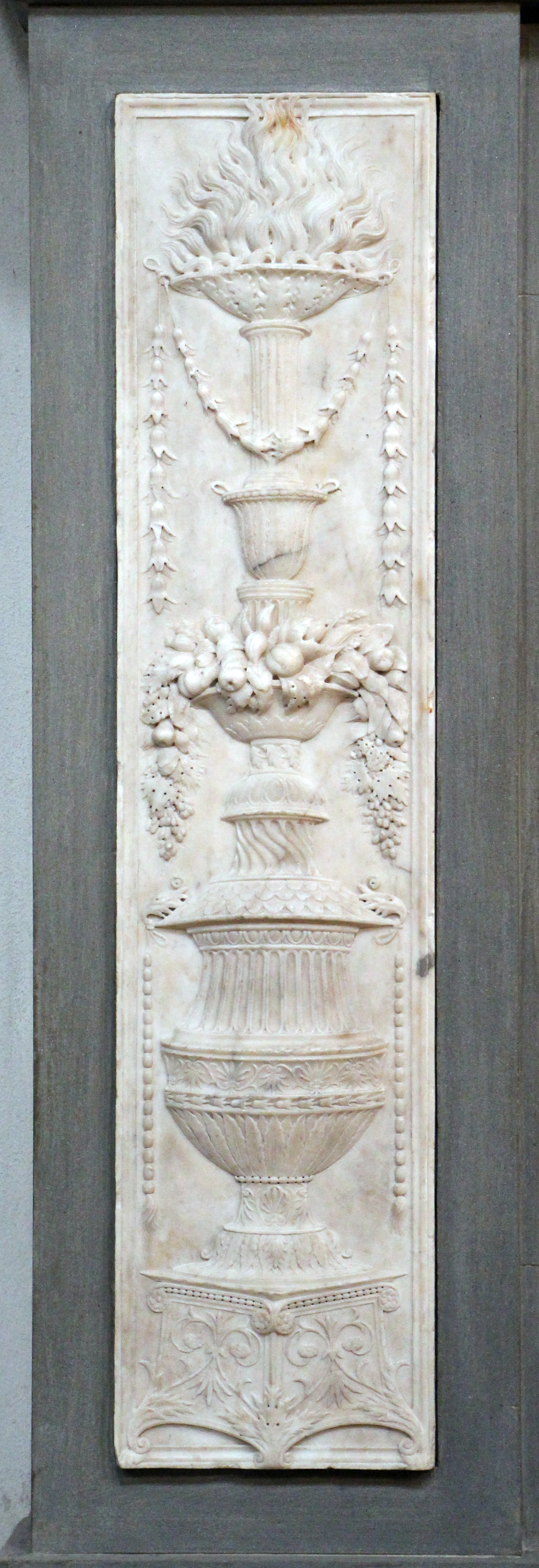
Renaissance margent on the San Lorenzo Tabernacle, by Desiderio da Settignano and Baccio da Montelupo, 1461, marble, Basilica of San Lorenzo, Florence, Italy

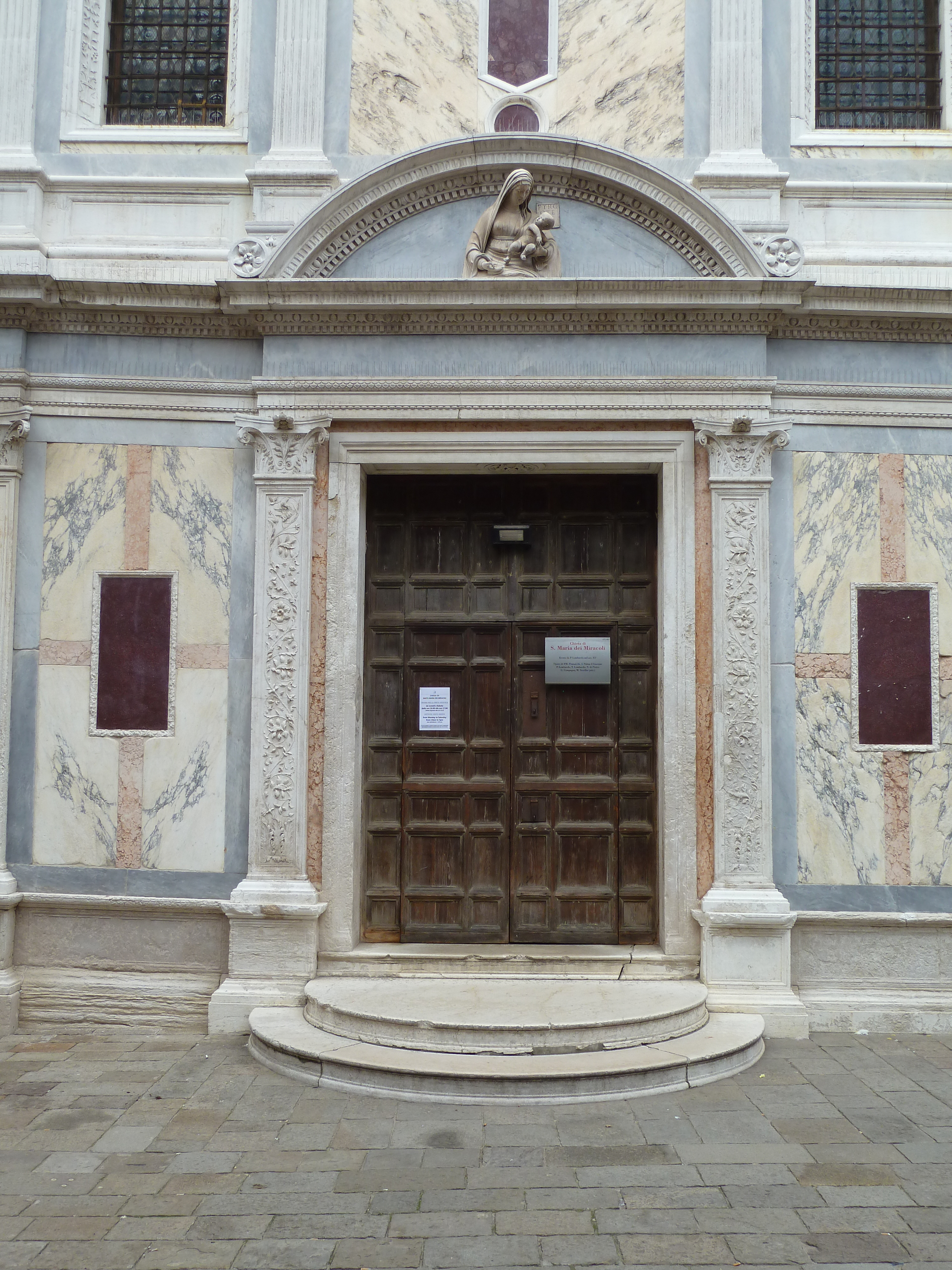
Renaissance margents on two pilasters of the entrance of the Santa Maria dei Miracoli, Venice, by Pietro Lombardo, 1481-1489

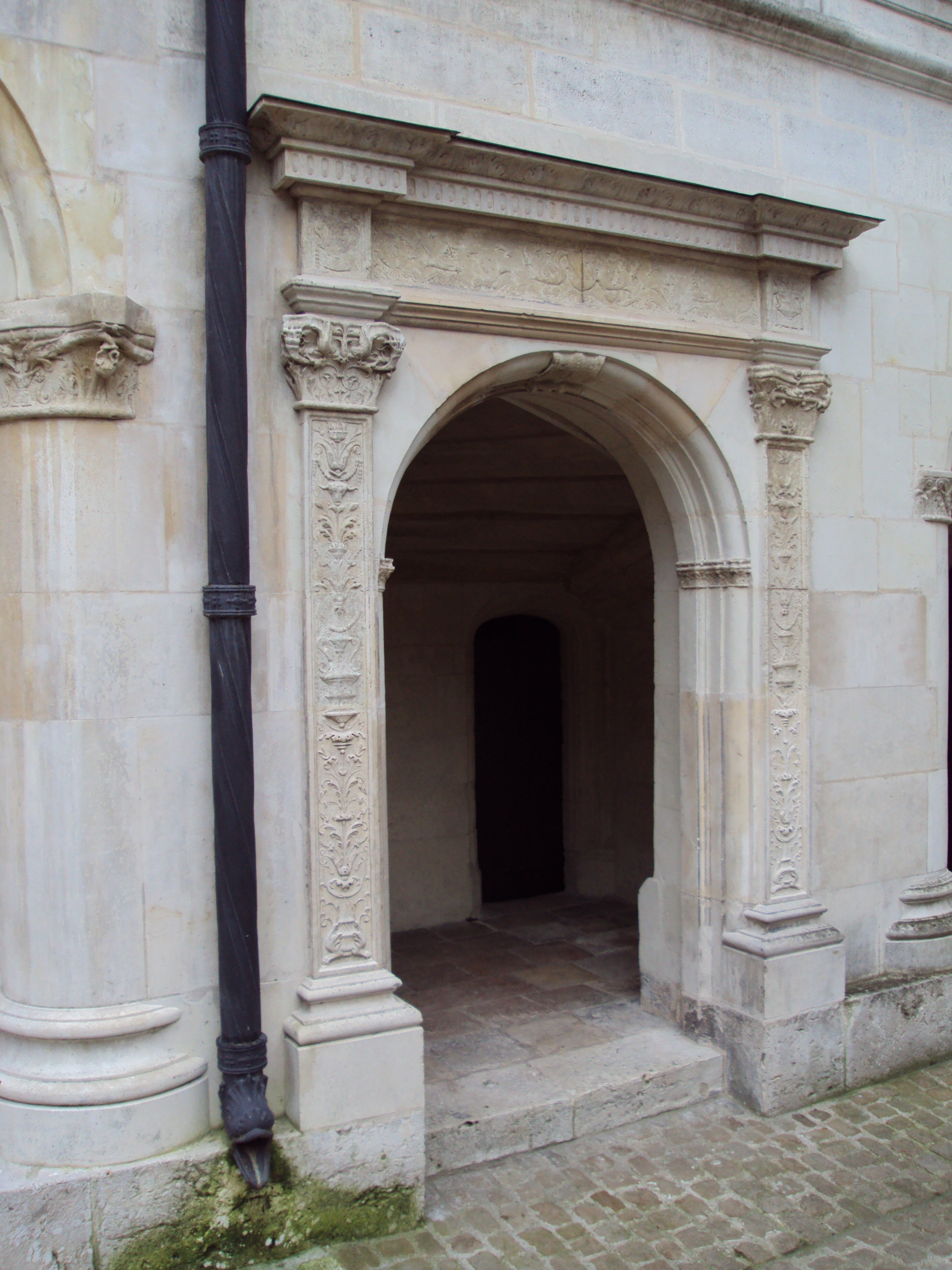
Renaissance margents on two pilasters in Hôtel d'Alluye, Blois, France, unknown architect or sculptor, 1498 (or 1500)-1508

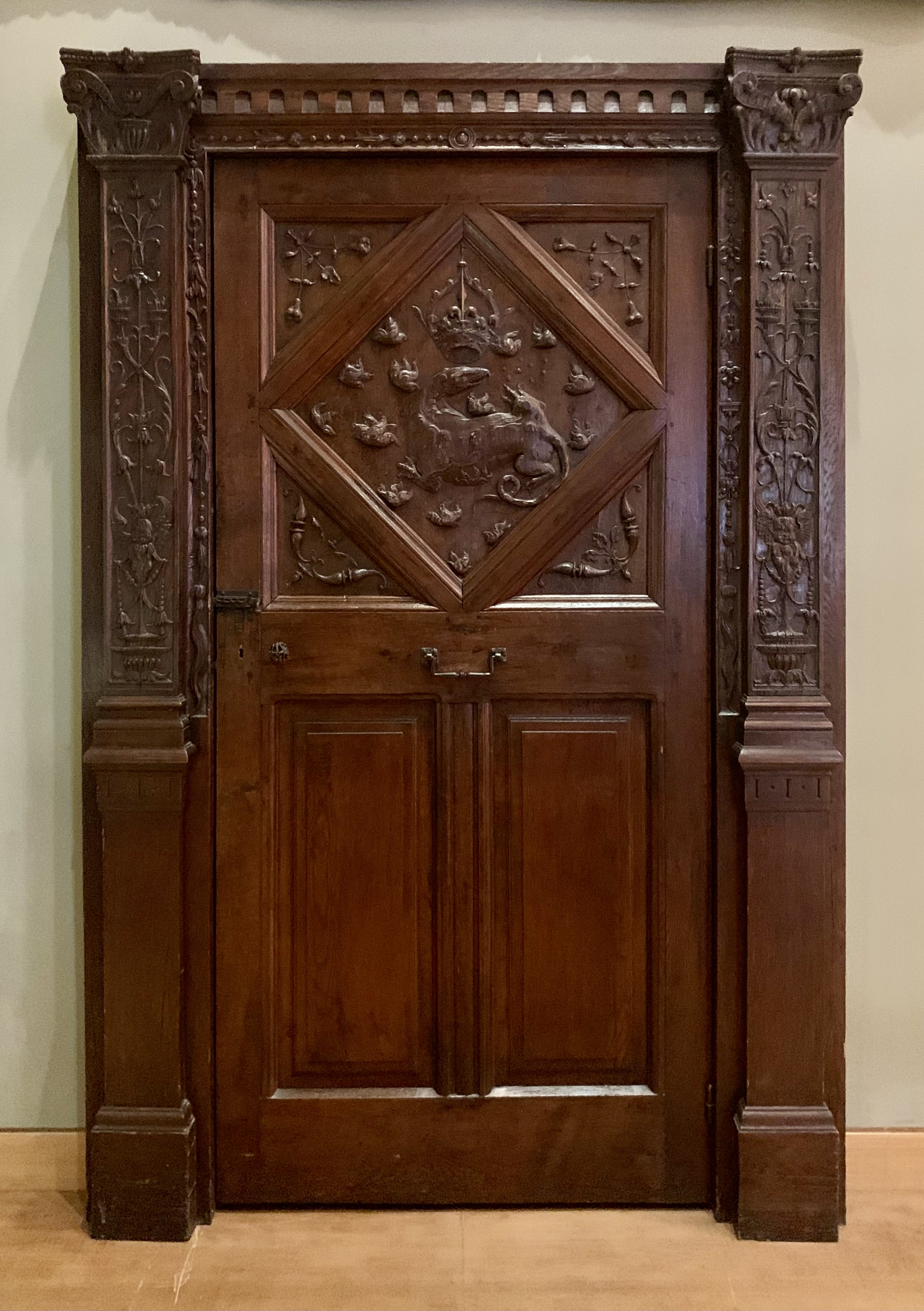
Renaissance margents on two pilasters of a door with the emblem of Francis I, 1515-1547, oak and metal, Louvre

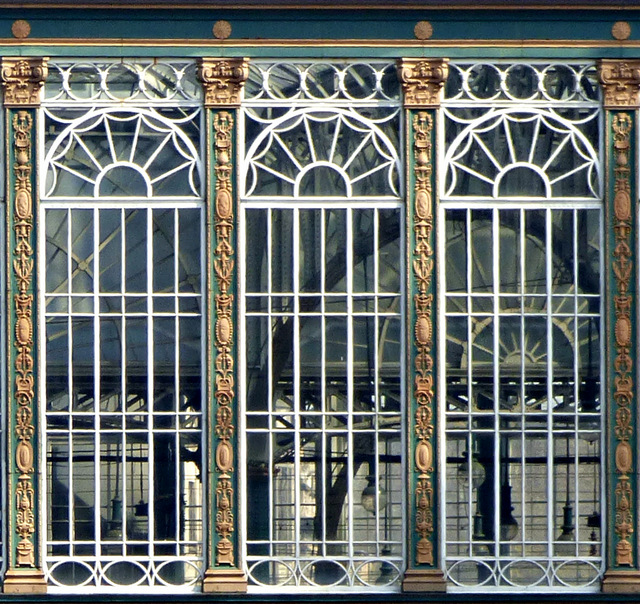
Renaissance Revival margents on pilasters of the Hielanman's Umbrella, Glasgow, UK, unknown architect, 1879

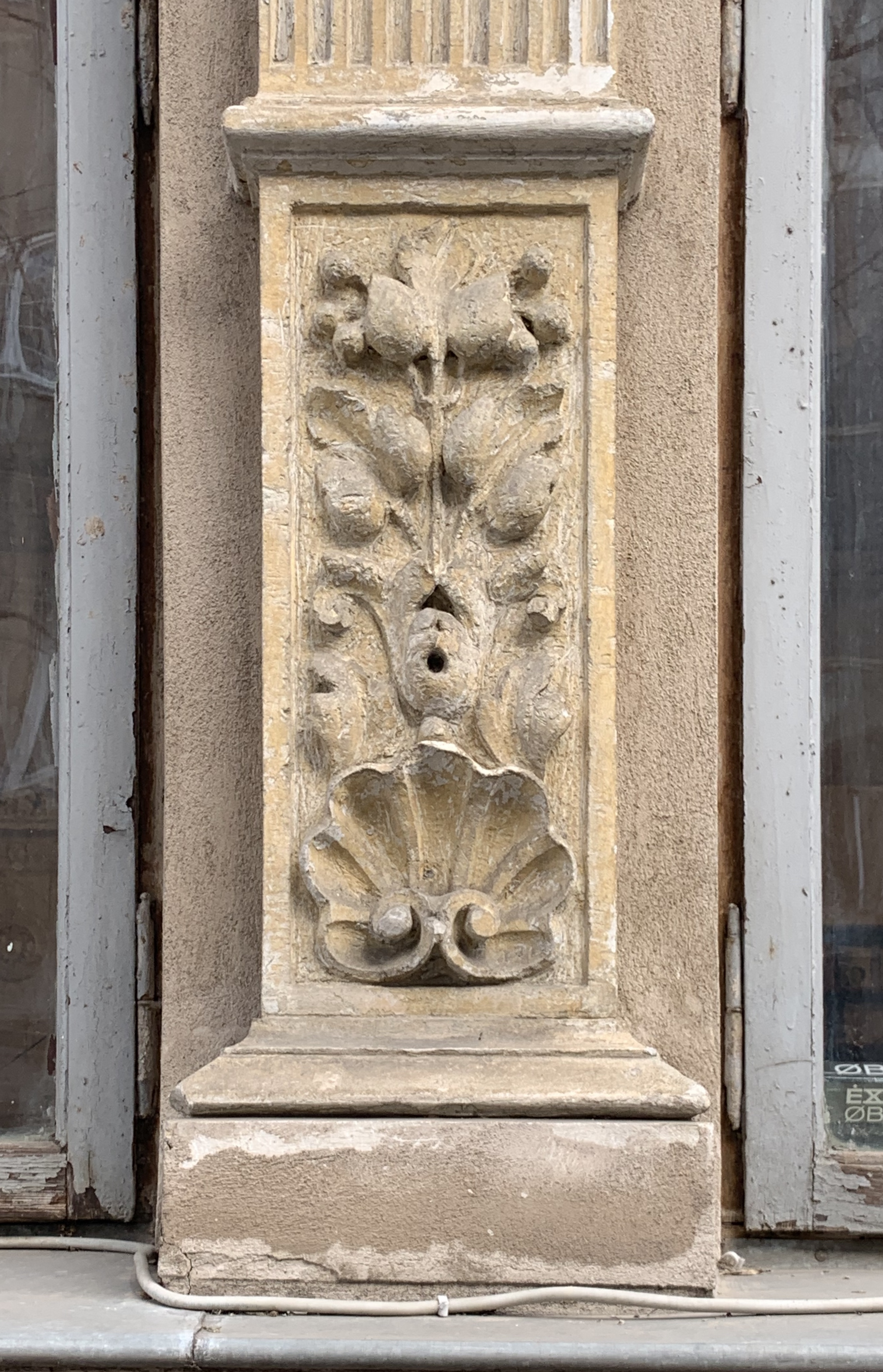
Renaissance Revival margent on a pilaster of the Dimitrie Sturdza House (Strada Arthur Verona no. 13-15), Bucharest, Romania, unknown architect, 1883

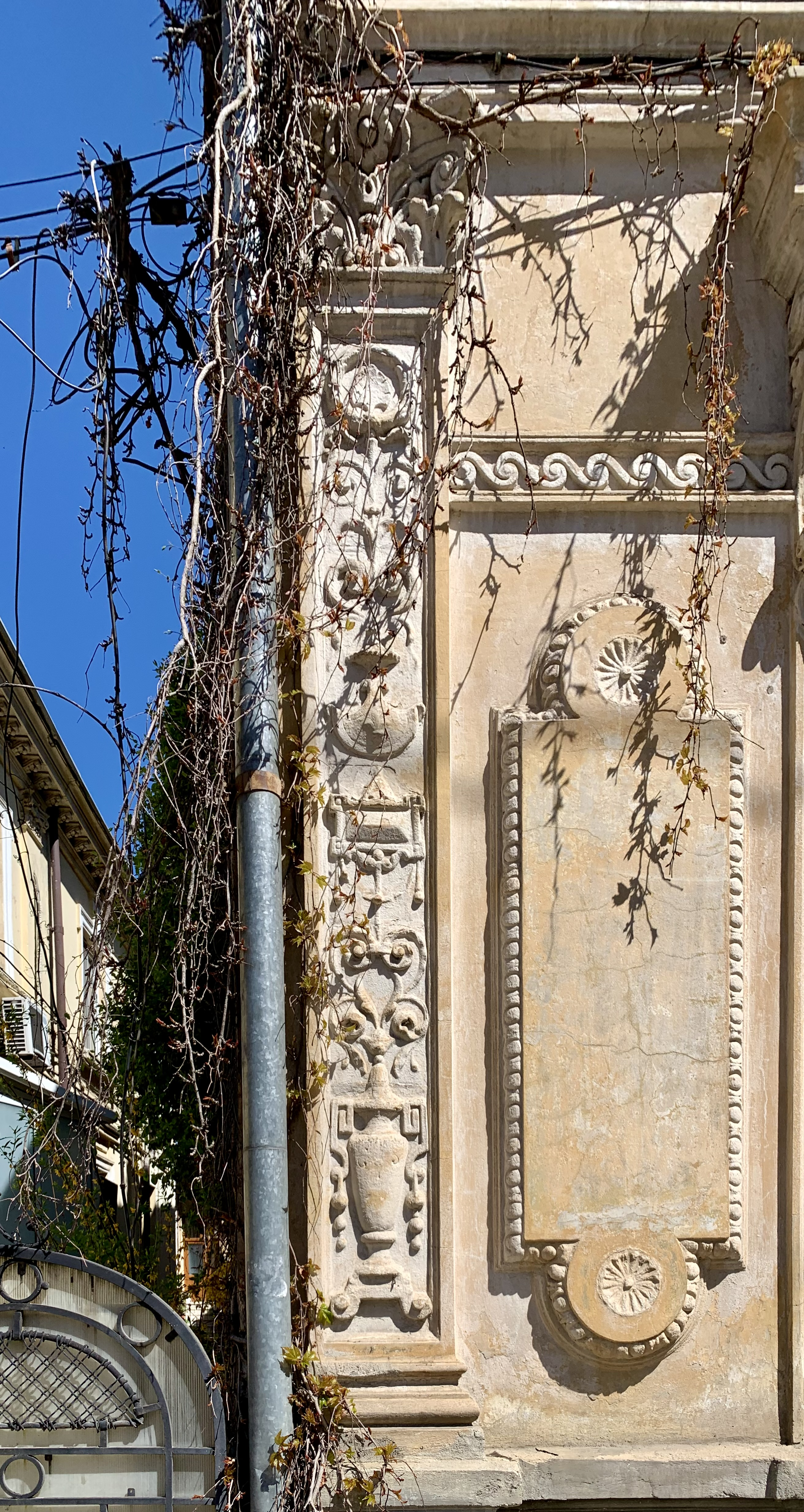
Renaissance Revival margent on a pilaster of Strada Grigore Cobălcescu no. 18, Bucharest, unknown architect, c.1890

== See also ==
- Marginalia
