= Maur =

Maur may refer to:

- Massachusetts Association of Universal Restorationists (MAUR), a Christian denomination.
- St Maurus, an Italian Catholic monk.
- Maur, India
- Maur, Switzerland
- Maur, the Black Dragon in The Hero and the Crown by Robin McKinley
- Mangaung Regiment, an infantry regiment of the South African Army
- Mauri/Moors

== See also ==
- Auf der Maur (surname)
- Maurus (disambiguation)
- Saint-Maur (disambiguation)
- St. Maur (disambiguation)
- Von Maur, an American department store
