= Arrondissement of Châteaudun =

Coordinates: 48°04′N 1°19′E

Châteaudun
- Arrondissement
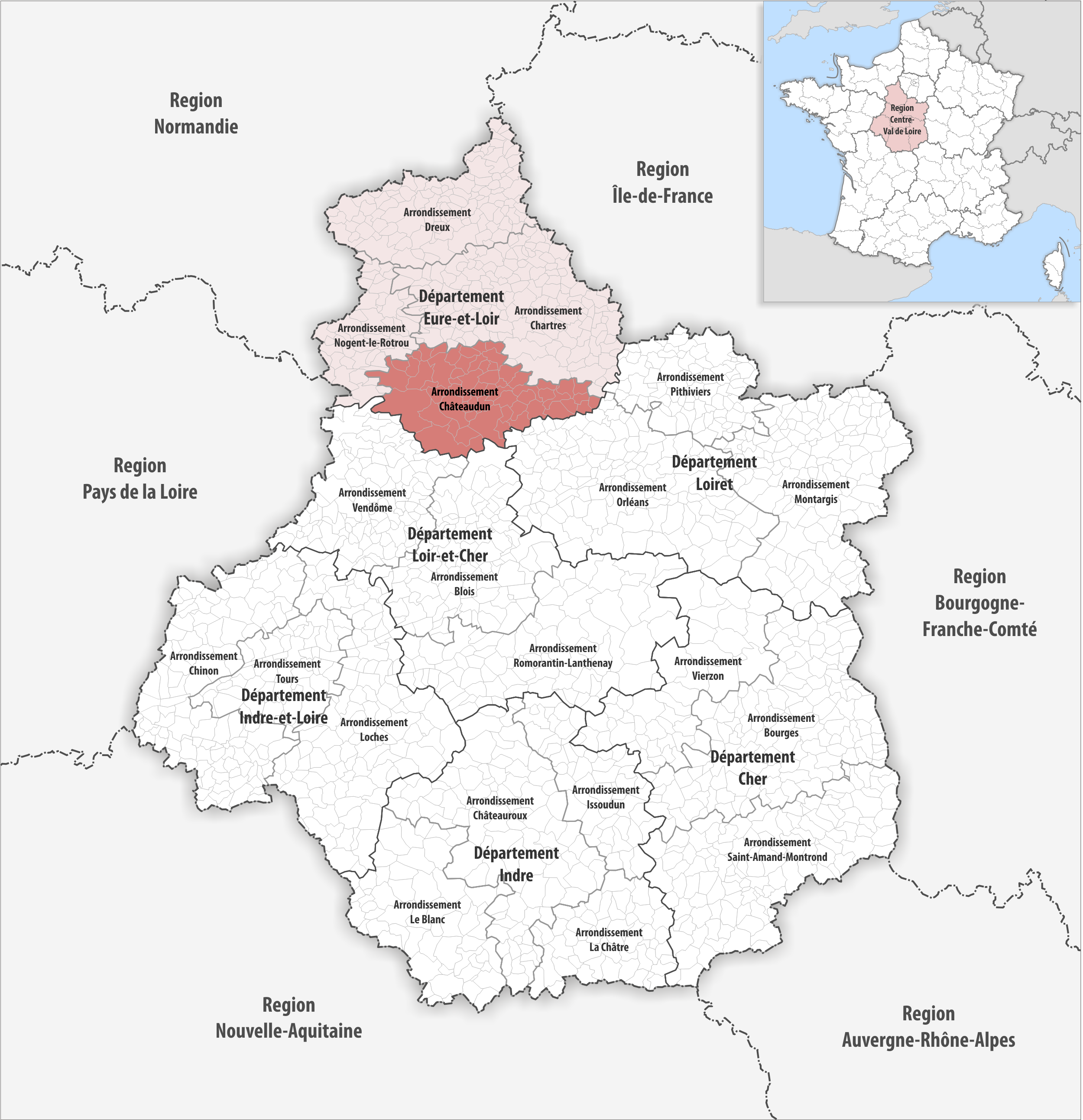
- Location within the region Centre-Val de Loire
- Country: France
- Region: Centre-Val de Loire
- Department: Eure-et-Loir
- No. of communes: {{{nbcomm}}}
- Area: 1,438.8 km^{2} (555.5 sq mi)
- Population (2023): 57,194
  - Density: 39.751/km^{2} (102.96/sq mi)
- INSEE code: 282

The arrondissement of Châteaudun is an arrondissement of France in the Eure-et-Loir department in the Centre-Val de Loire region. It has 61 communes. Its population is 57,387 (2021), and its area is 1,438.8 km^{2} (555.5 sq mi).

== Composition ==
The communes of the arrondissement of Châteaudun, and their INSEE codes, are:

1. Alluyes (28005)
2. Baigneaux (28019)
3. Bazoches-en-Dunois (28028)
4. Bazoches-les-Hautes (28029)
5. Bonneval (28051)
6. Bouville (28057)
7. Brou (28061)
8. Bullainville (28065)
9. La Chapelle-du-Noyer (28075)
10. Châteaudun (28088)
11. Cloyes-les-Trois-Rivières (28103)
12. Conie-Molitard (28106)
13. Cormainville (28108)
14. Courbehaye (28114)
15. Dambron (28121)
16. Dampierre-sous-Brou (28123)
17. Dancy (28126)
18. Dangeau (28127)
19. Donnemain-Saint-Mamès (28132)
20. Flacey (28153)
21. Fontenay-sur-Conie (28157)
22. Le Gault-Saint-Denis (28176)
23. Gohory (28182)
24. Guillonville (28190)
25. Jallans (28198)
26. Logron (28211)
27. Loigny-la-Bataille (28212)
28. Lumeau (28221)
29. Marboué (28233)
30. Meslay-le-Vidame (28246)
31. Moléans (28256)
32. Montboissier (28259)
33. Montharville (28260)
34. Moriers (28270)
35. Mottereau (28272)
36. Neuvy-en-Dunois (28277)
37. Nottonville (28283)
38. Orgères-en-Beauce (28287)
39. Péronville (28296)
40. Poupry (28303)
41. Pré-Saint-Évroult (28305)
42. Pré-Saint-Martin (28306)
43. Saint-Avit-les-Guespières (28326)
44. Saint-Christophe (28329)
45. Saint-Denis-Lanneray (28334)
46. Saint-Maur-sur-le-Loir (28353)
47. Sancheville (28364)
48. Saumeray (28370)
49. Terminiers (28382)
50. Thiville (28389)
51. Tillay-le-Péneux (28390)
52. Trizay-lès-Bonneval (28396)
53. Unverre (28398)
54. Vald'Yerre (28012)
55. Varize (28400)
56. Vieuvicq (28409)
57. Villampuy (28410)
58. Villemaury (28330)
59. Villiers-Saint-Orien (28418)
60. Vitray-en-Beauce (28419)
61. Yèvres (28424)

== History ==
The arrondissement of Châteaudun was created in 1800.

As a result of the reorganisation of the cantons of France which came into effect in 2015, the borders of the cantons are no longer related to the borders of the arrondissements. The cantons of the arrondissement of Châteaudun were, as of January 2015:

1. Bonneval
2. Brou
3. Châteaudun
4. Cloyes-sur-le-Loir
5. Orgères-en-Beauce
