= Villampuy =

- Commune
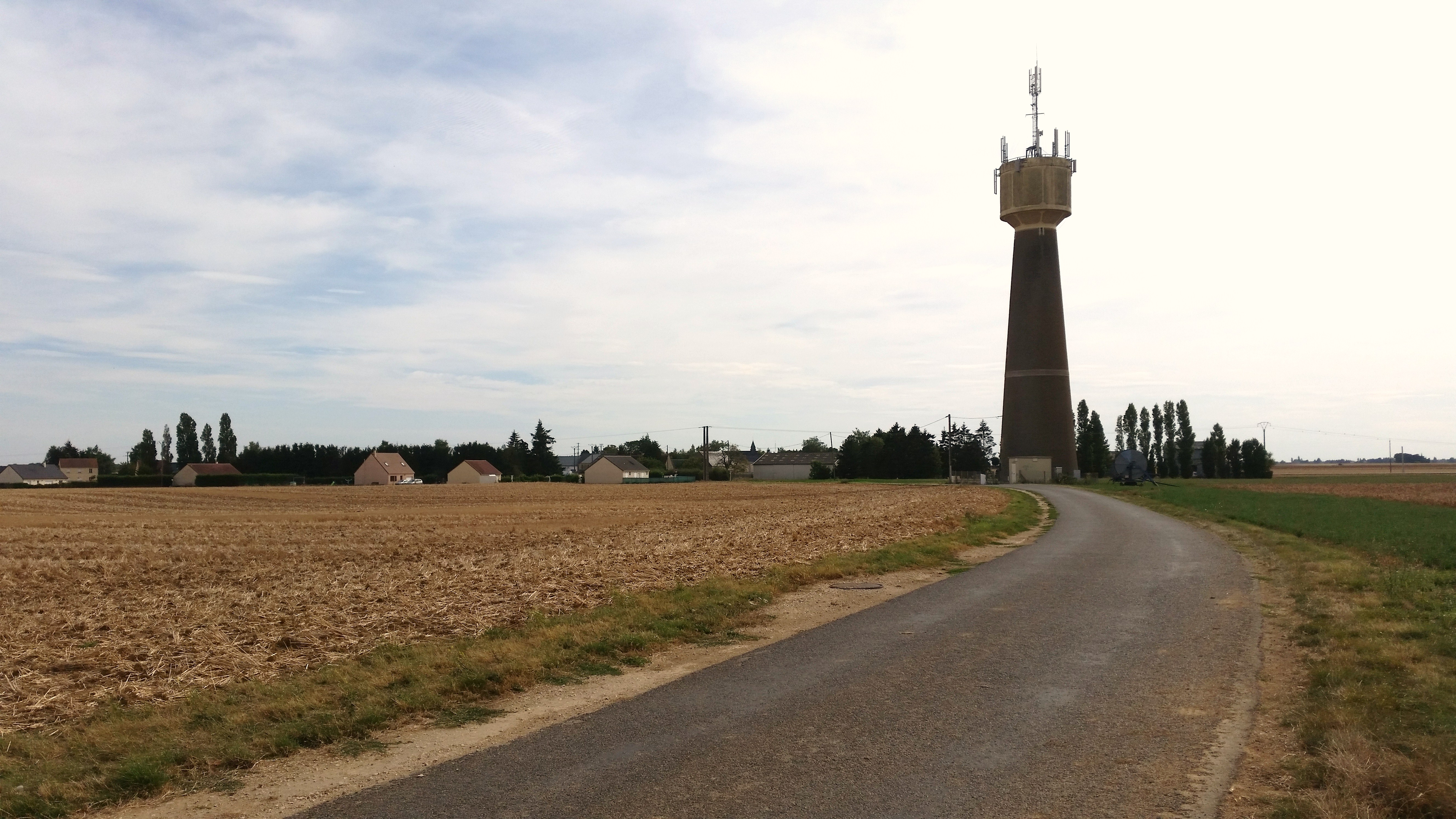
- The water tower and surroundings in Villampuy
- Location of Villampuy
- Location within France Location within Centre-Val de Loire
- Coordinates: 48°02′08″N 1°30′37″E
- Country: France
- Region: Centre-Val de Loire
- Department: Eure-et-Loir
- Arrondissement: Châteaudun
- Canton: Châteaudun

Government
  - Mayor (2020–2026): Vincent Lhopiteau
- Area^{1}: 16.71 km^{2} (6.45 sq mi)
- Elevation: 105 m (344 ft)
- Highest elevation: 135 m (443 ft)
- Lowest elevation: 124 m (407 ft)
- Population (2023): 296
  - Density: 17.7/km^{2} (45.9/sq mi)
- Time zone: UTC+01:00 (CET)
  - Summer (DST): UTC+02:00 (CEST)
- INSEE/Postal code: 28410 /28200
- ^{1} French Land Register data, which excludes lakes, ponds, glaciers > 1 km^{2} (0.386 sq mi or 247 acres) and river estuaries.

Villampuy (French pronunciation: [vilɑ̃pɥi]) is a commune in the Eure-et-Loir department in northern France.

== Population ==
Historical population
Year	Pop.	±% p.a.
1968	339	—
1975	301	−1.68%
1982	269	−1.59%
1990	266	−0.14%
1999	228	−1.70%
2007	279	+2.56%
2012	329	+3.35%
2017	306	−1.44%
2023	296	−0.55%
Source: INSEE

== See also ==
- Communes of the Eure-et-Loir department
