= Montboissier =

- Commune
- Location of Montboissier
- Location within France Location within Centre-Val de Loire
- Coordinates: 48°13′18″N 1°23′37″E
- Country: France
- Region: Centre-Val de Loire
- Department: Eure-et-Loir
- Arrondissement: Châteaudun
- Canton: Châteaudun
- Intercommunality: Bonnevalais

Government
  - Mayor (2020–2026): Bruno Lhoste
- Area^{1}: 13.94 km^{2} (5.38 sq mi)
- Elevation: 137 m (449 ft)
- Highest elevation: 144 m (472 ft)
- Lowest elevation: 121 m (397 ft)
- Population (2023): 341
  - Density: 24.5/km^{2} (63.4/sq mi)
- Time zone: UTC+01:00 (CET)
  - Summer (DST): UTC+02:00 (CEST)
- INSEE/Postal code: 28259 /28800
- ^{1} French Land Register data, which excludes lakes, ponds, glaciers > 1 km^{2} (0.386 sq mi or 247 acres) and river estuaries.

Montboissier (French pronunciation: [mɔ̃bwasje]) is a commune in the Eure-et-Loir department in northern France.

== Population ==
Historical population
Year	Pop.	±% p.a.
1968	335	—
1975	315	−0.88%
1982	311	−0.18%
1990	277	−1.44%
1999	279	+0.08%
2007	301	+0.95%
2012	329	+1.79%
2017	322	−0.43%
2023	341	+0.96%
Source: INSEE

== See also ==
- Communes of the Eure-et-Loir department
