= Moléans =

- Commune
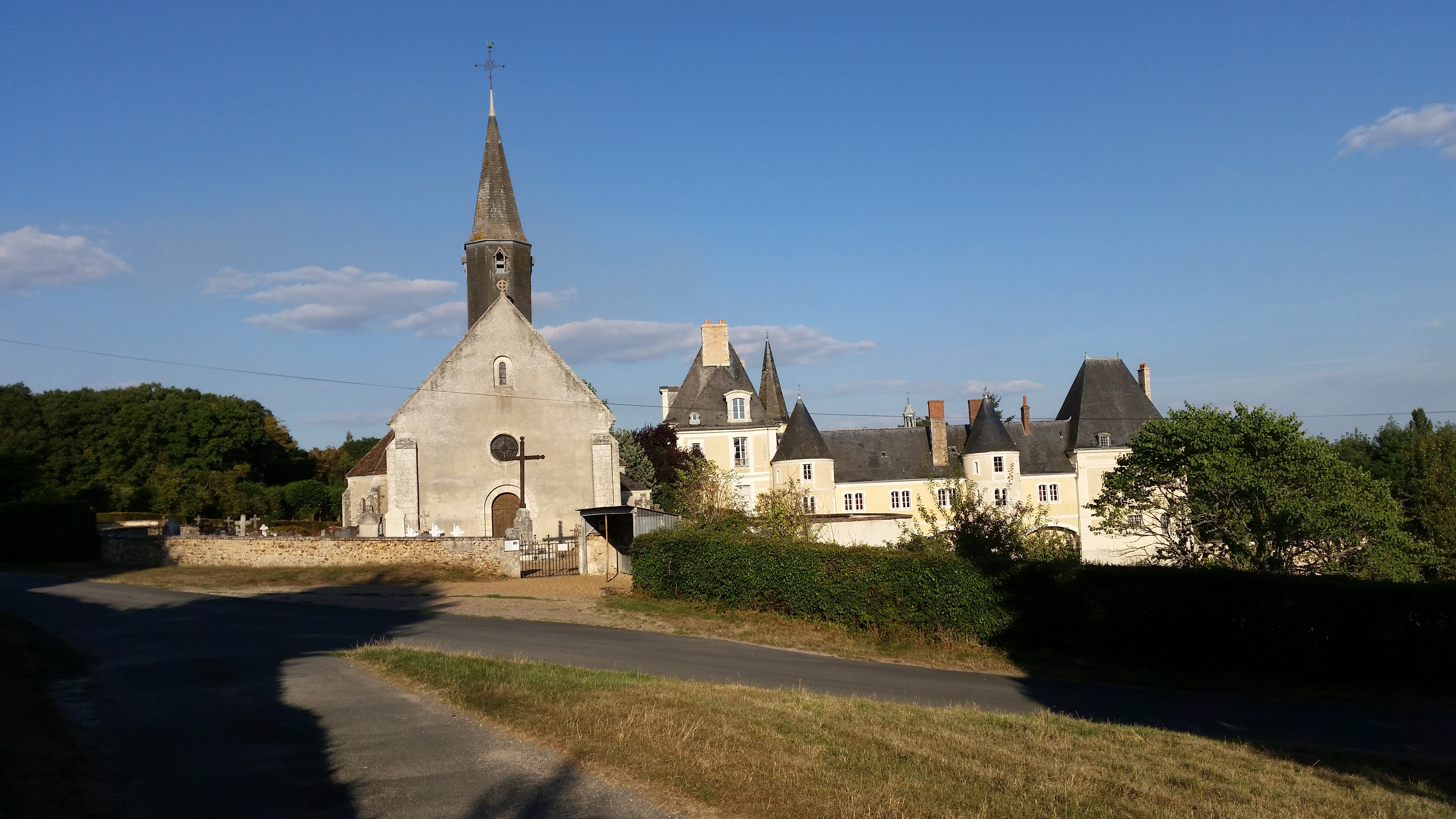
- The church and chateau in Moléans
- Location of Moléans
- Location within France Location within Centre-Val de Loire
- Coordinates: 48°07′07″N 1°23′25″E
- Country: France
- Region: Centre-Val de Loire
- Department: Eure-et-Loir
- Arrondissement: Châteaudun
- Canton: Châteaudun
- Intercommunality: Grand Châteaudun

Government
  - Mayor (2020–2026): Bruno Brochard
- Area^{1}: 11.09 km^{2} (4.28 sq mi)
- Elevation: 132 m (433 ft)
- Highest elevation: 142 m (466 ft)
- Lowest elevation: 107 m (351 ft)
- Population (2023): 433
  - Density: 39.0/km^{2} (101/sq mi)
- Time zone: UTC+01:00 (CET)
  - Summer (DST): UTC+02:00 (CEST)
- INSEE/Postal code: 28256 /28200
- ^{1} French Land Register data, which excludes lakes, ponds, glaciers > 1 km^{2} (0.386 sq mi or 247 acres) and river estuaries.

Moléans (French pronunciation: [mɔleɑ̃]) is a commune in the Eure-et-Loir department in northern France.

== Population ==
Historical population
Year	Pop.	±% p.a.
1968	268	—
1975	292	+1.23%
1982	436	+5.89%
1990	510	+1.98%
1999	476	−0.76%
2007	497	+0.54%
2012	475	−0.90%
2017	461	−0.60%
2023	433	−1.04%
Source: INSEE

== See also ==
- Communes of the Eure-et-Loir department
