= Marboué =

- Commune
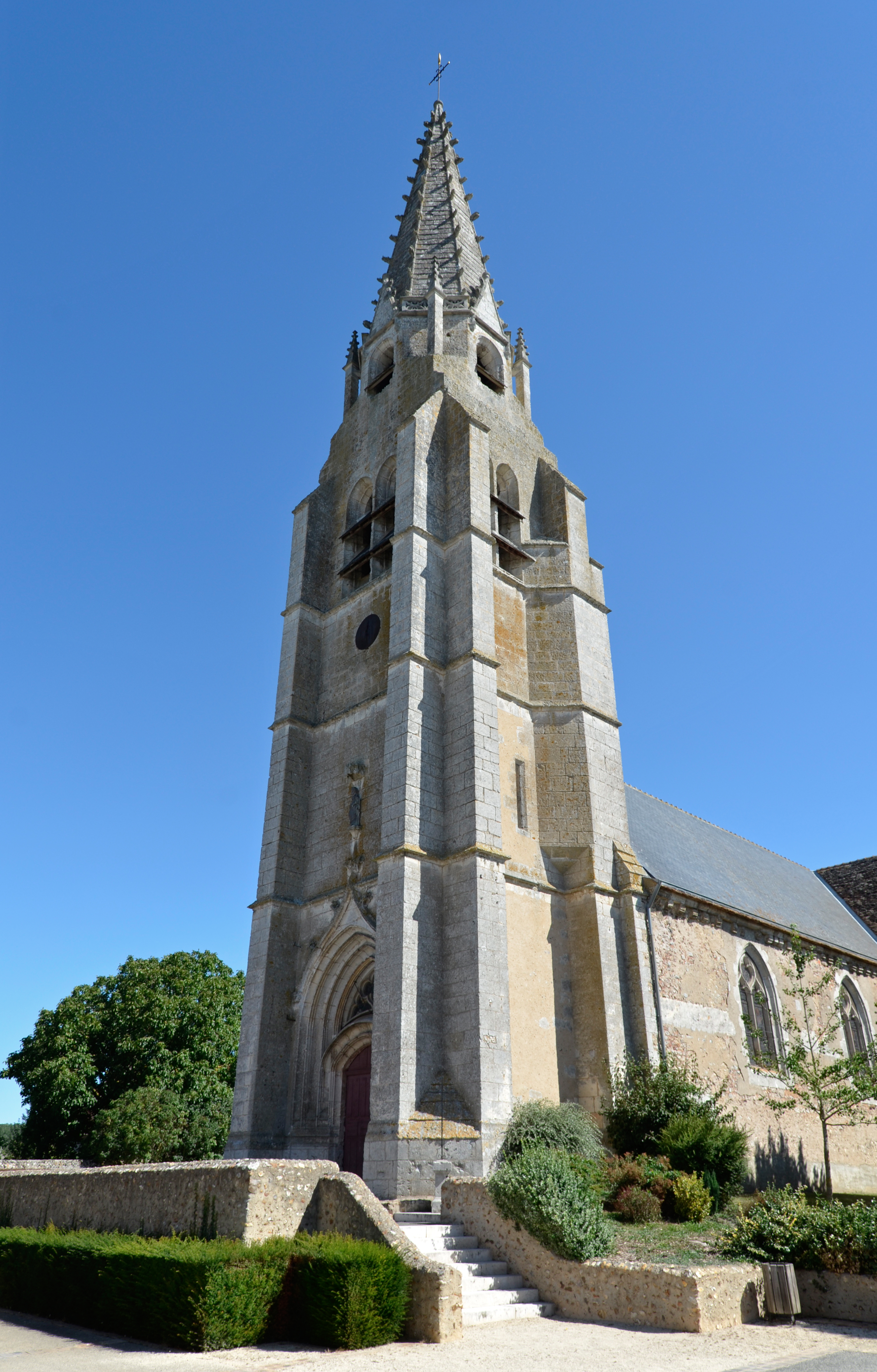
- The church in Marboué

- Coat of arms
- Location of Marboué
- Location within France Location within Centre-Val de Loire
- Coordinates: 48°06′50″N 1°19′50″E
- Country: France
- Region: Centre-Val de Loire
- Department: Eure-et-Loir
- Arrondissement: Châteaudun
- Canton: Châteaudun
- Intercommunality: Grand Châteaudun

Government
  - Mayor (2020–2026): Gaëlle Chasseloup
- Area^{1}: 26.56 km^{2} (10.25 sq mi)
- Elevation: 115 m (377 ft)
- Highest elevation: 158 m (518 ft)
- Lowest elevation: 106 m (348 ft)
- Population (2023): 1,108
  - Density: 41.72/km^{2} (108.0/sq mi)
- Time zone: UTC+01:00 (CET)
  - Summer (DST): UTC+02:00 (CEST)
- INSEE/Postal code: 28233 /28200
- ^{1} French Land Register data, which excludes lakes, ponds, glaciers > 1 km^{2} (0.386 sq mi or 247 acres) and river estuaries.

Marboué (French pronunciation: [maʁbwe]) is a commune in the Eure-et-Loir department in northern France.

In June 1944, French resident of American citizenship, Virginia Roush, married to d'Albert Lake, was arrested near the village, she may have been tortured but never betrayed her fellow fighters.

== Population ==
Historical population
Year	Pop.	±% p.a.
1968	951	—
1975	929	−0.33%
1982	1,015	+1.27%
1990	1,052	+0.45%
1999	1,117	+0.67%
2007	1,157	+0.44%
2012	1,113	−0.77%
2017	1,147	+0.60%
2023	1,108	−0.57%
Source: INSEE

== See also ==
- Communes of the Eure-et-Loir department
