= La Chapelle-du-Noyer =

- Commune
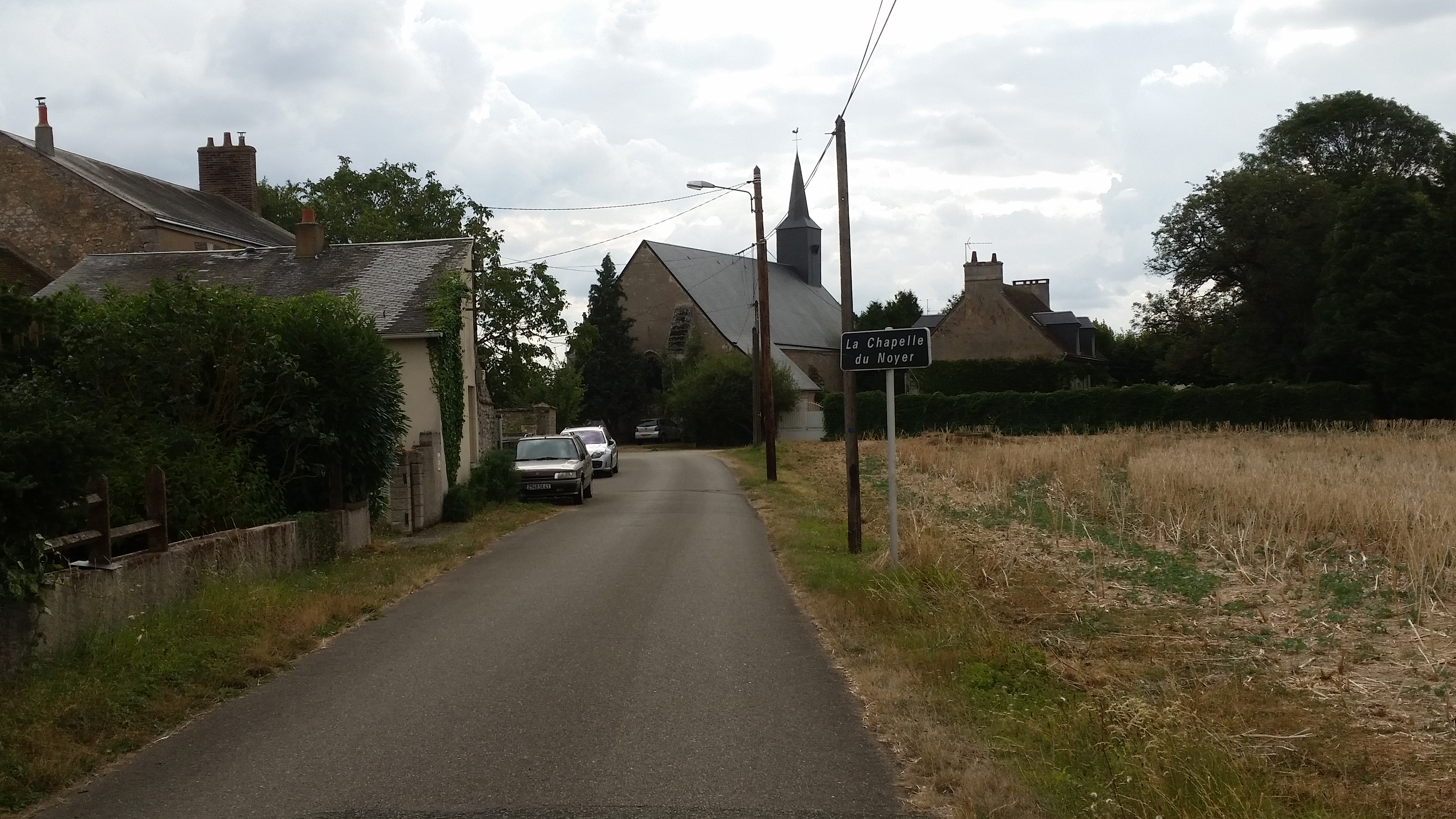
- The church and surroundings in La Chapelle-du-Noyer
- Location of La Chapelle-du-Noyer
- Location within France Location within Centre-Val de Loire
- Coordinates: 48°03′29″N 1°18′50″E
- Country: France
- Region: Centre-Val de Loire
- Department: Eure-et-Loir
- Arrondissement: Châteaudun
- Canton: Châteaudun
- Intercommunality: Grand Châteaudun

Government
  - Mayor (2020–2026): Martine Profeti
- Area^{1}: 13.31 km^{2} (5.14 sq mi)
- Elevation: 139 m (456 ft)
- Highest elevation: 146 m (479 ft)
- Lowest elevation: 102 m (335 ft)
- Population (2023): 1,015
  - Density: 76.26/km^{2} (197.5/sq mi)
- Time zone: UTC+01:00 (CET)
  - Summer (DST): UTC+02:00 (CEST)
- INSEE/Postal code: 28075 /28200
- ^{1} French Land Register data, which excludes lakes, ponds, glaciers > 1 km^{2} (0.386 sq mi or 247 acres) and river estuaries.

La Chapelle-du-Noyer (French pronunciation: [la ʃapɛl dy nwaje]) is a commune in the Eure-et-Loir department in northern France.

== Population ==
Historical population
Year	Pop.	±% p.a.
1968	757	—
1975	831	+1.34%
1982	932	+1.65%
1990	967	+0.46%
1999	1,056	+0.98%
2007	1,046	−0.12%
2012	1,075	+0.55%
2017	1,032	−0.81%
2023	1,015	−0.28%
Source: INSEE

== See also ==
- Communes of the Eure-et-Loir department
