= Dancy, Eure-et-Loir =

Dancy
- Commune
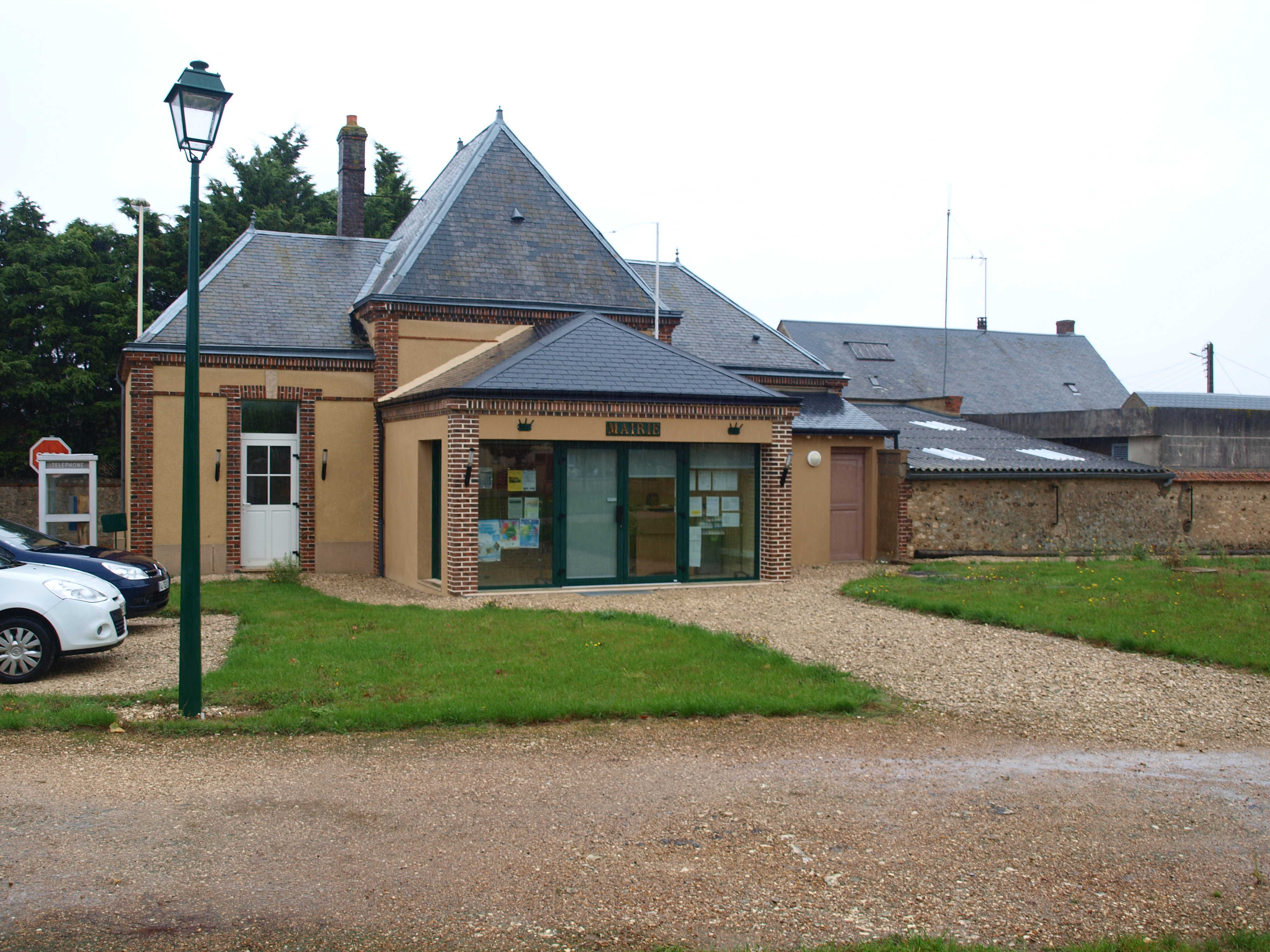
- The town hall in Dancy
- Location of Dancy
- Location within France Location within Centre-Val de Loire
- Coordinates: 48°09′02″N 1°27′49″E
- Country: France
- Region: Centre-Val de Loire
- Department: Eure-et-Loir
- Arrondissement: Châteaudun
- Canton: Châteaudun
- Intercommunality: Bonnevalais

Government
  - Mayor (2020–2026): Patrick Charpentier
- Area^{1}: 9.9 km^{2} (3.8 sq mi)
- Elevation: 240 m (790 ft)
- Highest elevation: 151 m (495 ft)
- Lowest elevation: 128 m (420 ft)
- Population (2023): 202
  - Density: 20/km^{2} (53/sq mi)
- Time zone: UTC+01:00 (CET)
  - Summer (DST): UTC+02:00 (CEST)
- INSEE/Postal code: 28126 /28800
- ^{1} French Land Register data, which excludes lakes, ponds, glaciers > 1 km^{2} (0.386 sq mi or 247 acres) and river estuaries.

Dancy (French pronunciation: [dɑ̃si]) is a commune in the Eure-et-Loir department in northern France.

== Population ==
Historical population
Year	Pop.	±% p.a.
1968	216	—
1975	215	−0.07%
1982	206	−0.61%
1990	189	−1.07%
1999	178	−0.66%
2007	193	+1.02%
2012	237	+4.19%
2017	203	−3.05%
2023	202	−0.08%
Source: INSEE

== See also ==
- Communes of the Eure-et-Loir department
