= Donnemain-Saint-Mamès =

- Commune
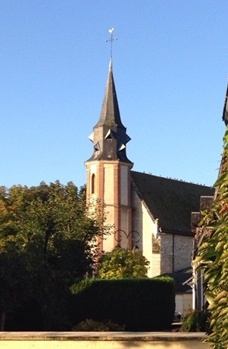
- The church in Donnemain-Saint-Mamès
- Location of Donnemain-Saint-Mamès
- Location within France Location within Centre-Val de Loire
- Coordinates: 48°06′34″N 1°22′20″E
- Country: France
- Region: Centre-Val de Loire
- Department: Eure-et-Loir
- Arrondissement: Châteaudun
- Canton: Châteaudun
- Intercommunality: Grand Châteaudun

Government
  - Mayor (2020–2026): Philippe Brochard
- Area^{1}: 12.78 km^{2} (4.93 sq mi)
- Elevation: 136 m (446 ft)
- Highest elevation: 143 m (469 ft)
- Lowest elevation: 106 m (348 ft)
- Population (2023): 654
  - Density: 51.2/km^{2} (133/sq mi)
- Time zone: UTC+01:00 (CET)
  - Summer (DST): UTC+02:00 (CEST)
- INSEE/Postal code: 28132 /28200
- ^{1} French Land Register data, which excludes lakes, ponds, glaciers > 1 km^{2} (0.386 sq mi or 247 acres) and river estuaries.

Donnemain-Saint-Mamès (French pronunciation: [dɔnmɛ̃ sɛ̃ mamɛ]) is a commune in the Eure-et-Loir department in northern France.

== Population ==
Historical population
Year	Pop.	±% p.a.
1968	385	—
1975	430	+1.59%
1982	453	+0.75%
1990	638	+4.37%
1999	611	−0.48%
2007	619	+0.16%
2012	700	+2.49%
2017	684	−0.46%
2023	654	−0.74%
Source: INSEE

== See also ==
- Communes of the Eure-et-Loir department
