= Saint-Christophe, Eure-et-Loir =

Saint-Christophe
- Commune
- Coat of arms
- Location of Saint-Christophe
- Location within France Location within Centre-Val de Loire
- Coordinates: 48°07′40″N 1°22′02″E
- Country: France
- Region: Centre-Val de Loire
- Department: Eure-et-Loir
- Arrondissement: Châteaudun
- Canton: Châteaudun
- Intercommunality: Grand Châteaudun

Government
  - Mayor (2020–2026): Gérard Carruelle
- Area^{1}: 6.13 km^{2} (2.37 sq mi)
- Elevation: 113 m (371 ft)
- Highest elevation: 152 m (499 ft)
- Lowest elevation: 107 m (351 ft)
- Population (2023): 143
  - Density: 23.3/km^{2} (60.4/sq mi)
- Time zone: UTC+01:00 (CET)
  - Summer (DST): UTC+02:00 (CEST)
- INSEE/Postal code: 28329 /28200
- ^{1} French Land Register data, which excludes lakes, ponds, glaciers > 1 km^{2} (0.386 sq mi or 247 acres) and river estuaries.

Saint-Christophe (French pronunciation: [sɛ̃ kʁistɔf]) is a commune in the Eure-et-Loir department in northern France.

== Population ==
Historical population
Year	Pop.	±% p.a.
1968	130	—
1975	111	−2.23%
1982	102	−1.20%
1990	138	+3.85%
1999	141	+0.24%
2007	146	+0.44%
2012	147	+0.14%
2017	159	+1.58%
2023	143	−1.75%
Source: INSEE

== See also ==
- Communes of the Eure-et-Loir department
