= Thiville =

- Commune
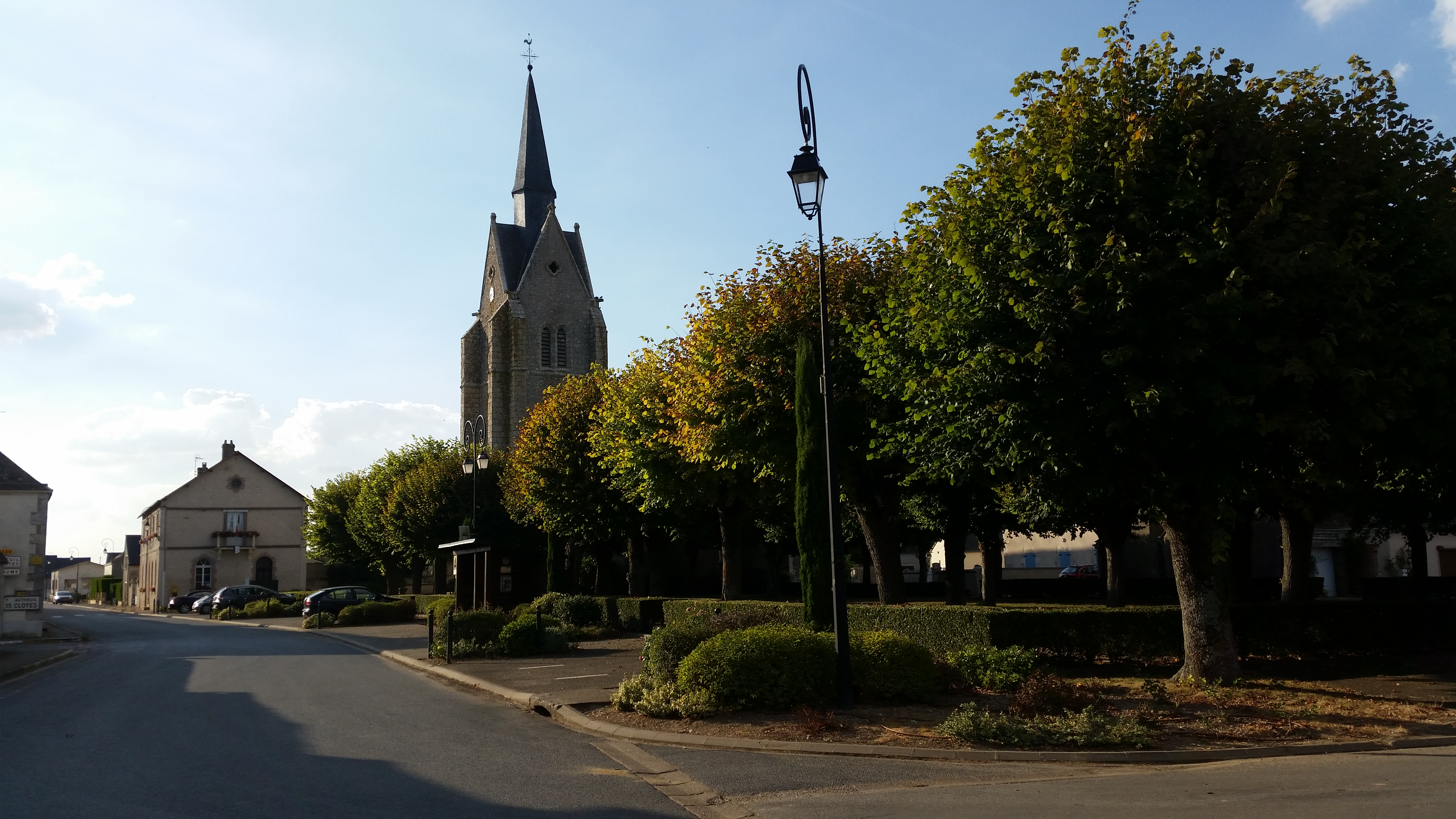
- The church and surroundings in Thiville
- Location of Thiville
- Location within France Location within Centre-Val de Loire
- Coordinates: 48°01′34″N 1°22′33″E
- Country: France
- Region: Centre-Val de Loire
- Department: Eure-et-Loir
- Arrondissement: Châteaudun
- Canton: Châteaudun

Government
  - Mayor (2020–2026): Bruno Jorry
- Area^{1}: 27.8 km^{2} (10.7 sq mi)
- Elevation: 136 m (446 ft)
- Highest elevation: 140 m (460 ft)
- Lowest elevation: 108 m (354 ft)
- Population (2023): 334
  - Density: 12.0/km^{2} (31.1/sq mi)
- Time zone: UTC+01:00 (CET)
  - Summer (DST): UTC+02:00 (CEST)
- INSEE/Postal code: 28389 /28200
- ^{1} French Land Register data, which excludes lakes, ponds, glaciers > 1 km^{2} (0.386 sq mi or 247 acres) and river estuaries.

Thiville (French pronunciation: [tivil]) is a commune in the Eure-et-Loir department in northern France.

== Population ==
Historical population
Year	Pop.	±% p.a.
1968	429	—
1975	402	−0.92%
1982	367	−1.29%
1990	377	+0.34%
1999	354	−0.70%
2007	344	−0.36%
2012	367	+1.30%
2017	342	−1.40%
2023	334	−0.39%
Source: INSEE

== See also ==
- Communes of the Eure-et-Loir department
