= Saumeray =

- Commune
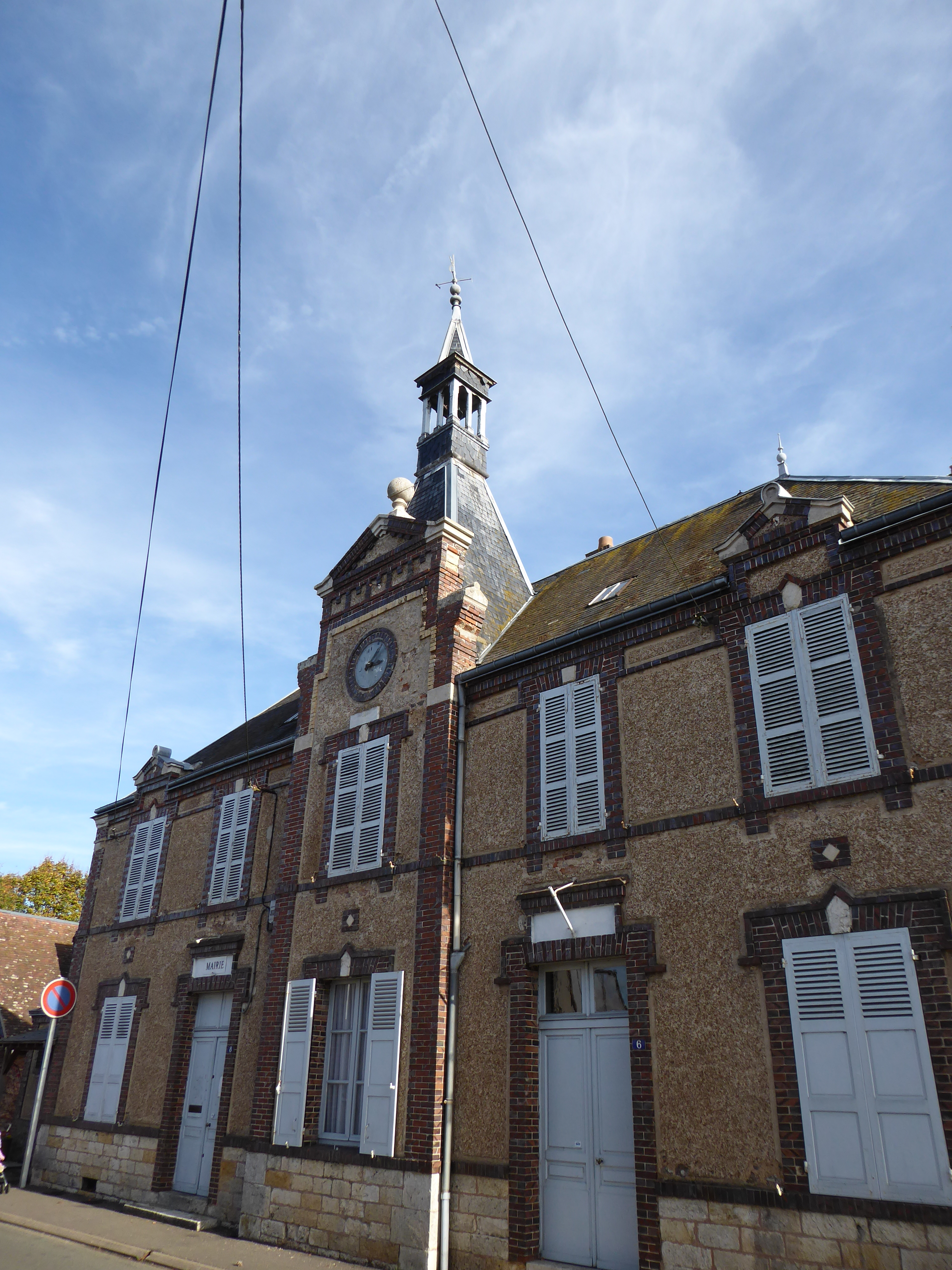
- The town hall in Saumeray
- Location of Saumeray
- Location within France Location within Centre-Val de Loire
- Coordinates: 48°15′07″N 1°19′15″E
- Country: France
- Region: Centre-Val de Loire
- Department: Eure-et-Loir
- Arrondissement: Châteaudun
- Canton: Châteaudun
- Intercommunality: Bonnevalais

Government
  - Mayor (2020–2026): Daniel Berthomé
- Area^{1}: 19.46 km^{2} (7.51 sq mi)
- Elevation: 136 m (446 ft)
- Highest elevation: 157 m (515 ft)
- Lowest elevation: 130 m (430 ft)
- Population (2023): 465
  - Density: 23.9/km^{2} (61.9/sq mi)
- Time zone: UTC+01:00 (CET)
  - Summer (DST): UTC+02:00 (CEST)
- INSEE/Postal code: 28370 /28800
- ^{1} French Land Register data, which excludes lakes, ponds, glaciers > 1 km^{2} (0.386 sq mi or 247 acres) and river estuaries.

Saumeray (French pronunciation: [somʁɛ]) is a commune in the Eure-et-Loir department in northern France.

== Population ==
Historical population
Year	Pop.	±% p.a.
1968	413	—
1975	341	−2.70%
1982	295	−2.05%
1990	333	+1.53%
1999	354	+0.68%
2007	410	+1.85%
2012	441	+1.47%
2017	491	+2.17%
2023	465	−0.90%
Source: INSEE

== See also ==
- Communes of the Eure-et-Loir department
