= Jallans =

- Commune
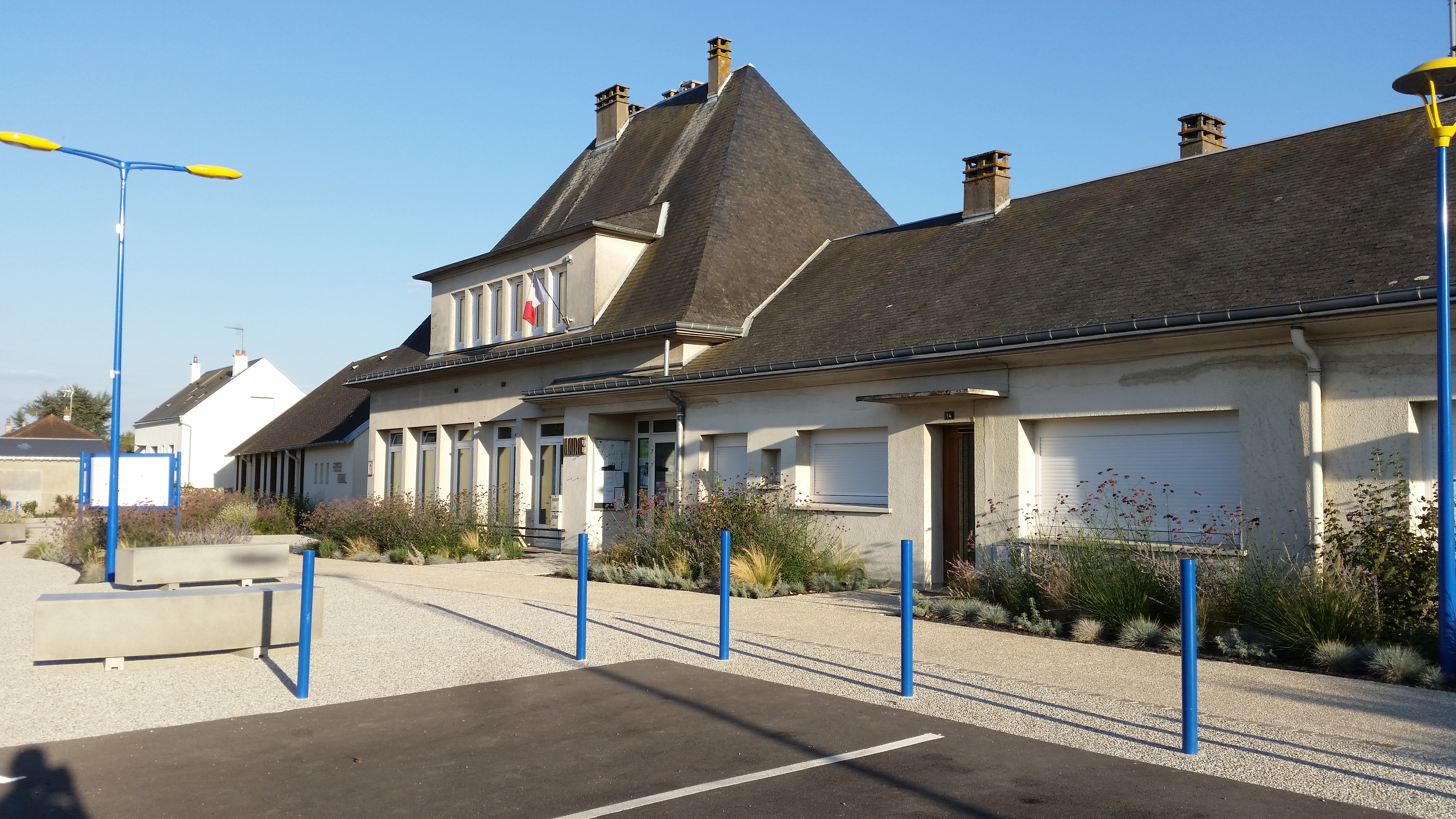
- The town hall in Jallans
- Location of Jallans
- Location within France Location within Centre-Val de Loire
- Coordinates: 48°04′33″N 1°22′18″E
- Country: France
- Region: Centre-Val de Loire
- Department: Eure-et-Loir
- Arrondissement: Châteaudun
- Canton: Châteaudun

Government
  - Mayor (2020–2026): Olivier Lecomte
- Area^{1}: 8.99 km^{2} (3.47 sq mi)
- Elevation: 127 m (417 ft)
- Highest elevation: 134 m (440 ft)
- Lowest elevation: 118 m (387 ft)
- Population (2023): 786
  - Density: 87.4/km^{2} (226/sq mi)
- Time zone: UTC+01:00 (CET)
  - Summer (DST): UTC+02:00 (CEST)
- INSEE/Postal code: 28198 /28200
- ^{1} French Land Register data, which excludes lakes, ponds, glaciers > 1 km^{2} (0.386 sq mi or 247 acres) and river estuaries.

Jallans (French pronunciation: [ʒalɑ̃]) is a commune in the Eure-et-Loir department in the Centre-Val de Loire region in northern France.

== Population ==
Historical population
Year	Pop.	±% p.a.
1968	484	—
1975	570	+2.36%
1982	631	+1.46%
1990	772	+2.55%
1999	751	−0.31%
2007	751	+0.00%
2012	804	+1.37%
2017	809	+0.12%
2023	786	−0.48%
Source: INSEE

== See also ==
- Communes of the Eure-et-Loir department
