= Moriers =

- Commune
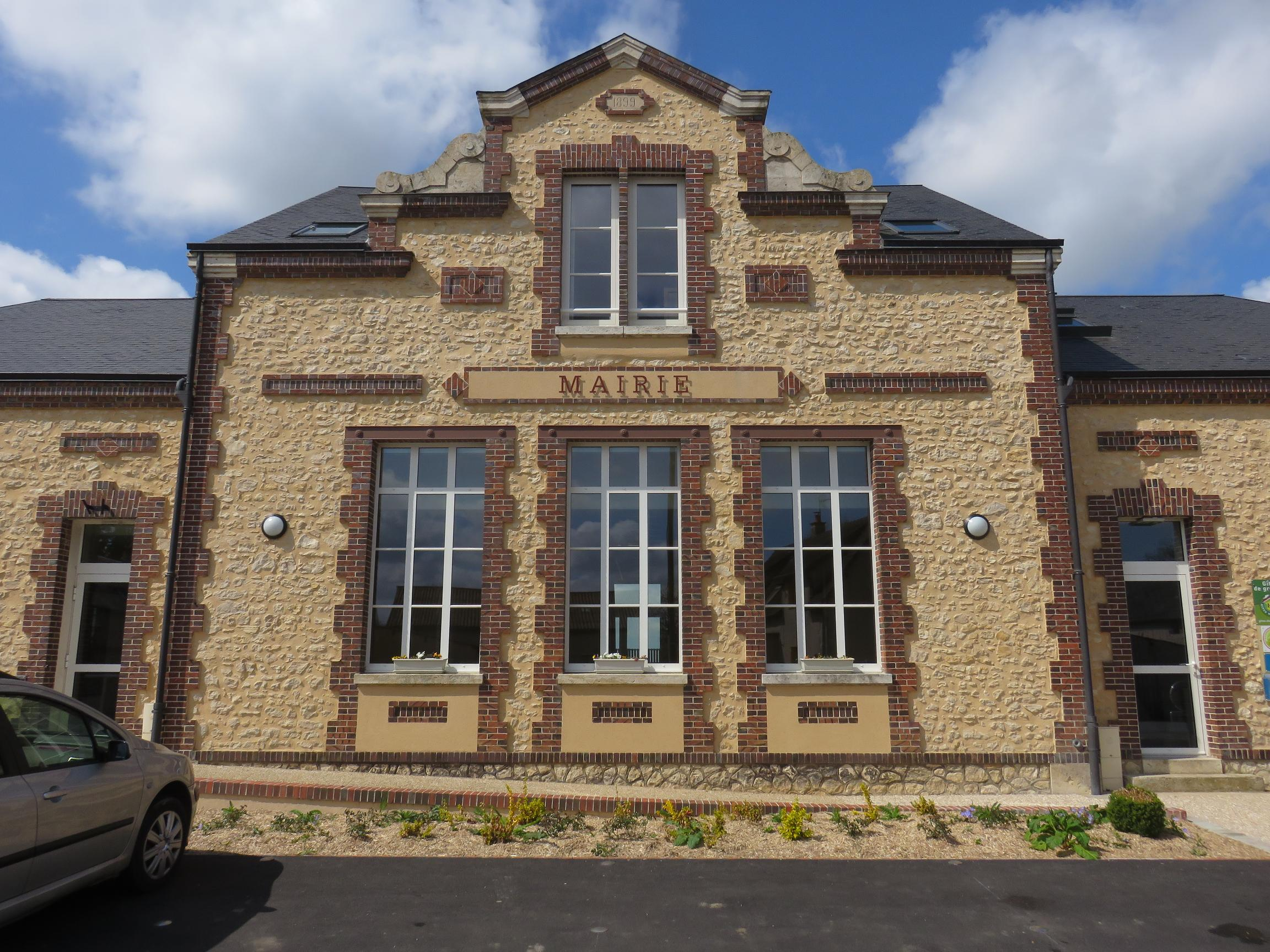
- The town hall in Moriers
- Location of Moriers
- Location within France Location within Centre-Val de Loire
- Coordinates: 48°12′56″N 1°26′20″E
- Country: France
- Region: Centre-Val de Loire
- Department: Eure-et-Loir
- Arrondissement: Châteaudun
- Canton: Châteaudun
- Intercommunality: Bonnevalais

Government
  - Mayor (2022–2026): Fabrice Chaboche
- Area^{1}: 9.03 km^{2} (3.49 sq mi)
- Elevation: 138 m (453 ft)
- Highest elevation: 143 m (469 ft)
- Lowest elevation: 131 m (430 ft)
- Population (2023): 223
  - Density: 24.7/km^{2} (64.0/sq mi)
- Time zone: UTC+01:00 (CET)
  - Summer (DST): UTC+02:00 (CEST)
- INSEE/Postal code: 28270 /28800
- ^{1} French Land Register data, which excludes lakes, ponds, glaciers > 1 km^{2} (0.386 sq mi or 247 acres) and river estuaries.

Moriers (French pronunciation: [mɔʁje]) is a commune in the Eure-et-Loir department in northern France.

== Population ==
Historical population
Year	Pop.	±% p.a.
1968	273	—
1975	215	−3.35%
1982	193	−1.53%
1990	186	−0.46%
1999	210	+1.36%
2007	209	−0.06%
2012	212	+0.29%
2017	224	+1.11%
2023	223	−0.07%
Source: INSEE

== See also ==
- Communes of the Eure-et-Loir department
