= Villiers-Saint-Orien =

- Commune
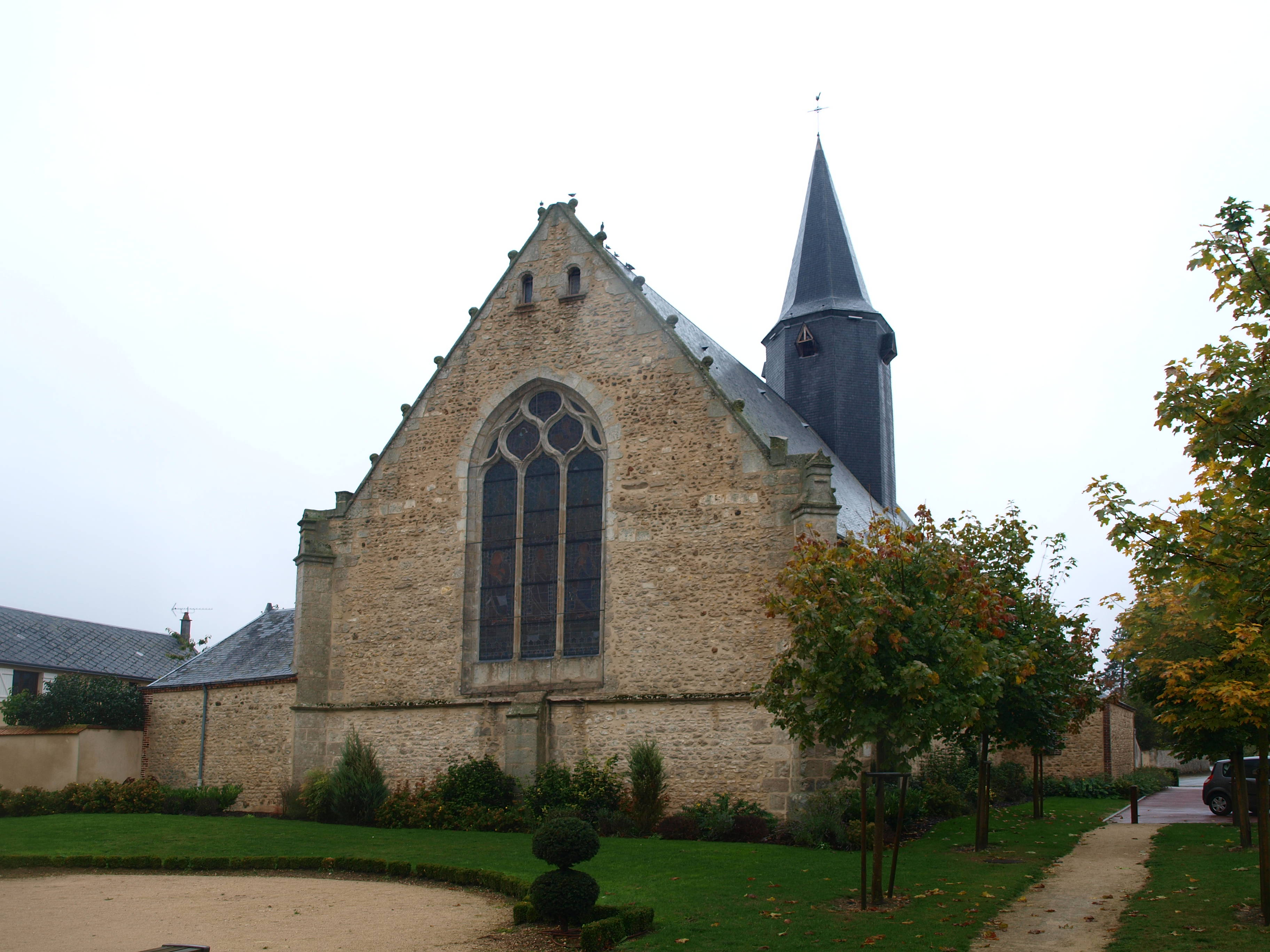
- The church in Villiers-Saint-Orien
- Location of Villiers-Saint-Orien
- Location within France Location within Centre-Val de Loire
- Coordinates: 48°08′03″N 1°29′25″E
- Country: France
- Region: Centre-Val de Loire
- Department: Eure-et-Loir
- Arrondissement: Châteaudun
- Canton: Châteaudun
- Intercommunality: Bonnevalais

Government
  - Mayor (2020–2026): Dominique Imbault
- Area^{1}: 15.11 km^{2} (5.83 sq mi)
- Elevation: 137 m (449 ft)
- Highest elevation: 144 m (472 ft)
- Lowest elevation: 112 m (367 ft)
- Population (2023): 162
  - Density: 10.7/km^{2} (27.8/sq mi)
- Time zone: UTC+01:00 (CET)
  - Summer (DST): UTC+02:00 (CEST)
- INSEE/Postal code: 28418 /28800
- ^{1} French Land Register data, which excludes lakes, ponds, glaciers > 1 km^{2} (0.386 sq mi or 247 acres) and river estuaries.

Villiers-Saint-Orien (French pronunciation: [vilje sɛ̃.t‿ɔʁjɛ̃]) is a commune in the Eure-et-Loir department in northern France.

== Population ==
Historical population
Year	Pop.	±% p.a.
1968	213	—
1975	204	−0.61%
1982	173	−2.33%
1990	157	−1.21%
1999	156	−0.07%
2007	177	+1.59%
2012	164	−1.51%
2017	163	−0.12%
2023	162	−0.10%
Source: INSEE

== See also ==
- Communes of the Eure-et-Loir department
