= Logron =

- Commune
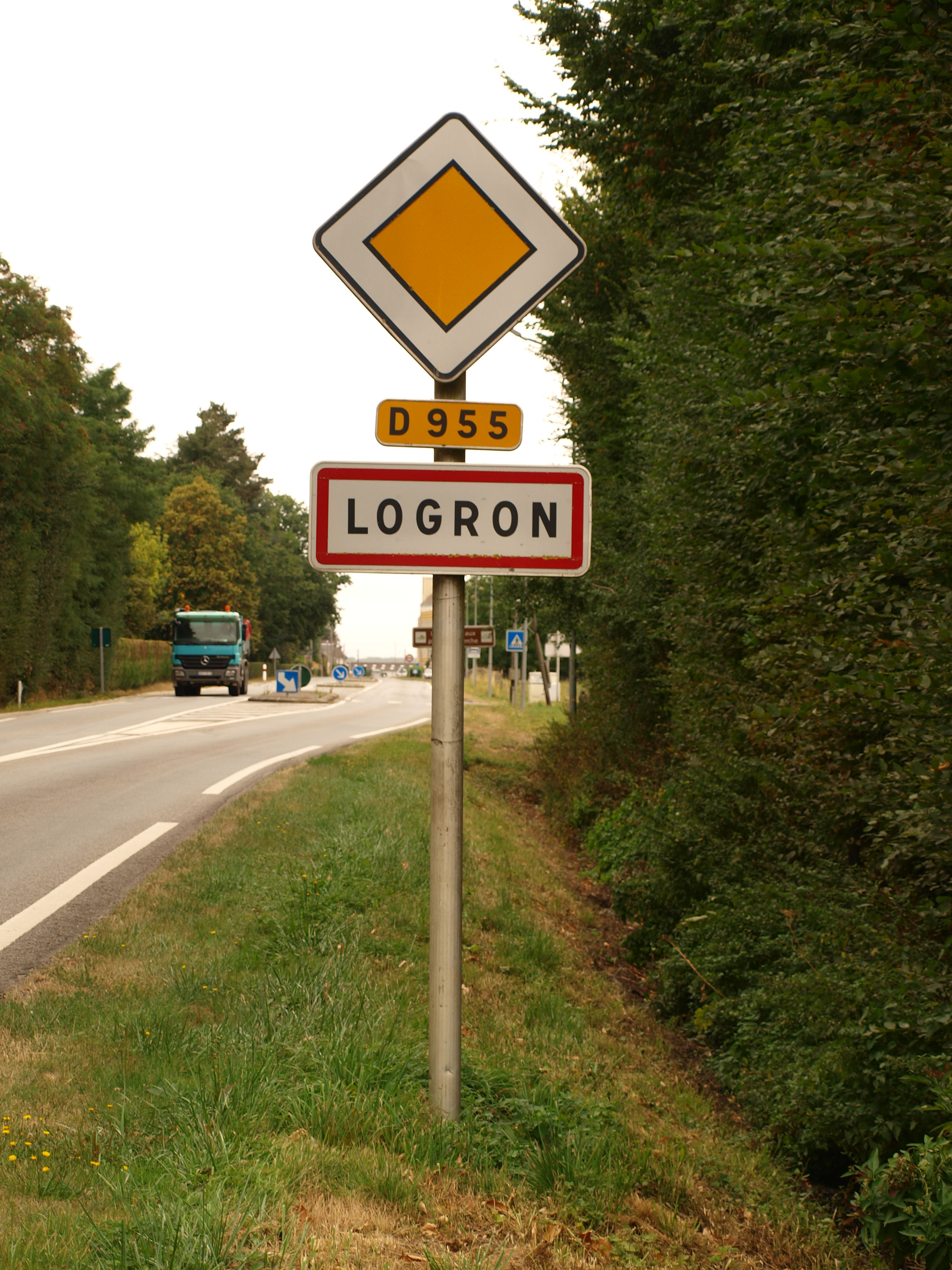
- The road into Logron

- Coat of arms
- Location of Logron
- Location within France Location within Centre-Val de Loire
- Coordinates: 48°08′50″N 1°15′45″E
- Country: France
- Region: Centre-Val de Loire
- Department: Eure-et-Loir
- Arrondissement: Châteaudun
- Canton: Châteaudun
- Intercommunality: Grand Châteaudun

Government
  - Mayor (2020–2026): Marie-Laure Renvoizé
- Area^{1}: 22.64 km^{2} (8.74 sq mi)
- Elevation: 170 m (560 ft)
- Highest elevation: 174 m (571 ft)
- Lowest elevation: 146 m (479 ft)
- Population (2023): 577
  - Density: 25.5/km^{2} (66.0/sq mi)
- Time zone: UTC+01:00 (CET)
  - Summer (DST): UTC+02:00 (CEST)
- INSEE/Postal code: 28211 /28200
- ^{1} French Land Register data, which excludes lakes, ponds, glaciers > 1 km^{2} (0.386 sq mi or 247 acres) and river estuaries.

Logron (French pronunciation: [lɔɡʁɔ̃]) is a commune in the Eure-et-Loir department in northern France.

== Population ==
Historical population
Year	Pop.	±% p.a.
1968	470	—
1975	420	−1.59%
1982	491	+2.26%
1990	499	+0.20%
1999	502	+0.07%
2007	520	+0.44%
2012	579	+2.17%
2017	585	+0.21%
2023	577	−0.23%
Source: INSEE

== See also ==
- Communes of the Eure-et-Loir department
