= Conie-Molitard =

- Commune
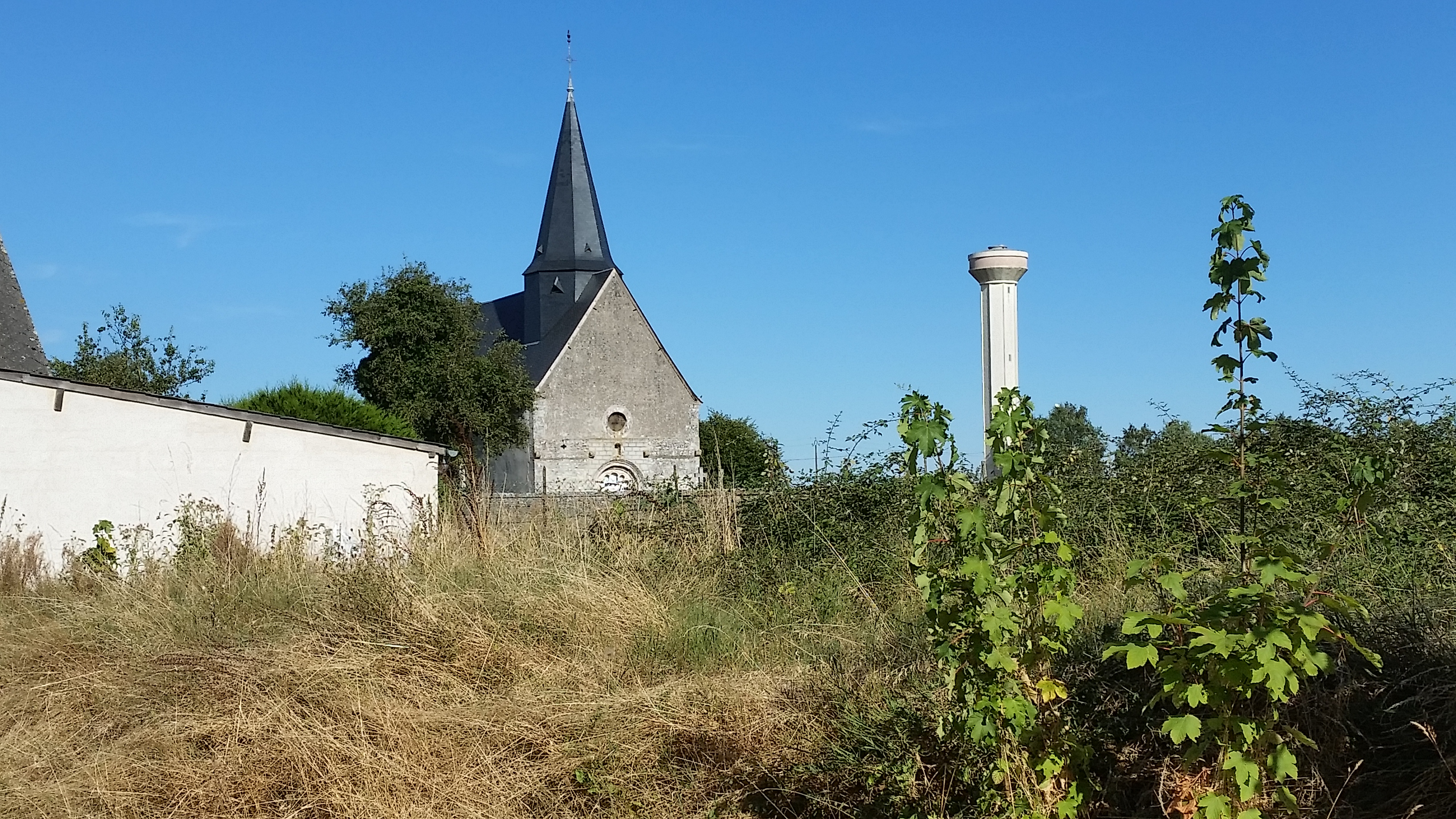
- The church and surroundings in Conie-Molitard
- Location of Conie-Molitard
- Location within France Location within Centre-Val de Loire
- Coordinates: 48°06′52″N 1°26′29″E
- Country: France
- Region: Centre-Val de Loire
- Department: Eure-et-Loir
- Arrondissement: Châteaudun
- Canton: Châteaudun

Government
  - Mayor (2020–2026): Anne Gennesseaux
- Area^{1}: 15.17 km^{2} (5.86 sq mi)
- Elevation: 1,301 m (4,268 ft)
- Highest elevation: 149 m (489 ft)
- Lowest elevation: 110 m (360 ft)
- Population (2023): 387
  - Density: 25.5/km^{2} (66.1/sq mi)
- Time zone: UTC+01:00 (CET)
  - Summer (DST): UTC+02:00 (CEST)
- INSEE/Postal code: 28106 /28200
- ^{1} French Land Register data, which excludes lakes, ponds, glaciers > 1 km^{2} (0.386 sq mi or 247 acres) and river estuaries.

Conie-Molitard (French pronunciation: [kɔni mɔlitaʁ]) is a commune in the Eure-et-Loir department in northern France.

== Population ==
Historical population
Year	Pop.	±% p.a.
1968	254	—
1975	233	−1.23%
1982	309	+4.12%
1990	337	+1.09%
1999	338	+0.03%
2007	374	+1.27%
2012	378	+0.21%
2017	406	+1.44%
2023	387	−0.80%
Source: INSEE

== See also ==
- Communes of the Eure-et-Loir department
