= Montharville =

- Commune
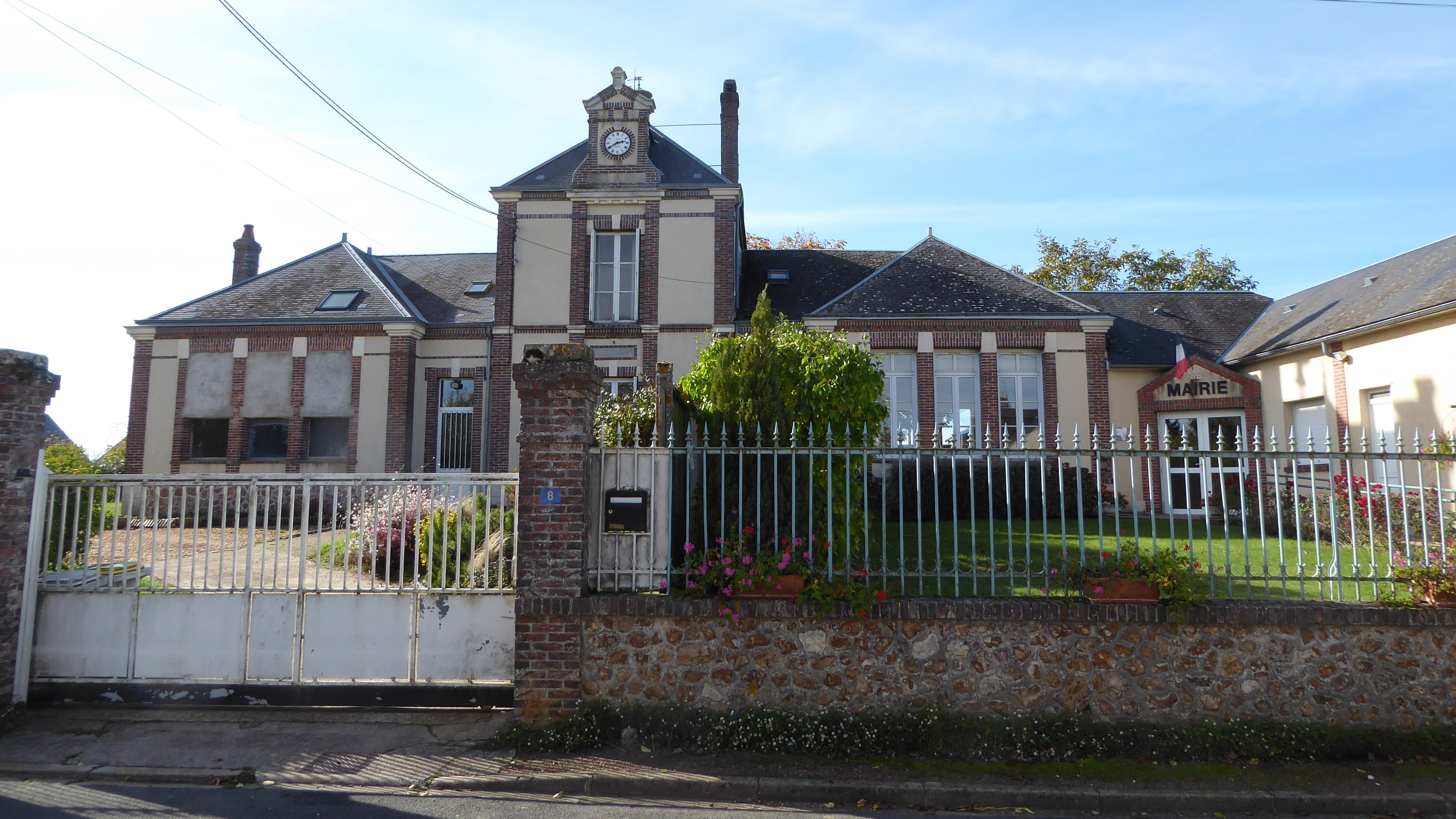
- Town hall
- Location of Montharville
- Location within France Location within Centre-Val de Loire
- Coordinates: 48°11′04″N 1°19′55″E
- Country: France
- Region: Centre-Val de Loire
- Department: Eure-et-Loir
- Arrondissement: Châteaudun
- Canton: Châteaudun
- Intercommunality: Bonnevalais

Government
  - Mayor (2020–2026): Gilles Rousselet
- Area^{1}: 6.34 km^{2} (2.45 sq mi)
- Elevation: 145 m (476 ft)
- Highest elevation: 182 m (597 ft)
- Lowest elevation: 144 m (472 ft)
- Population (2023): 105
  - Density: 16.6/km^{2} (42.9/sq mi)
- Time zone: UTC+01:00 (CET)
  - Summer (DST): UTC+02:00 (CEST)
- INSEE/Postal code: 28260 /28800
- ^{1} French Land Register data, which excludes lakes, ponds, glaciers > 1 km^{2} (0.386 sq mi or 247 acres) and river estuaries.

Montharville (French pronunciation: [mɔ̃taʁvil]) is a commune in the Eure-et-Loir department in northern France.

== Population ==
Historical population
Year	Pop.	±% p.a.
1968	79	—
1975	71	−1.51%
1982	87	+2.95%
1990	94	+0.97%
1999	77	−2.19%
2007	99	+3.19%
2012	101	+0.40%
2017	98	−0.60%
2023	105	+1.16%
Source: INSEE

== See also ==
- Communes of the Eure-et-Loir department
