= Flacey, Eure-et-Loir =

Flacey
- Commune
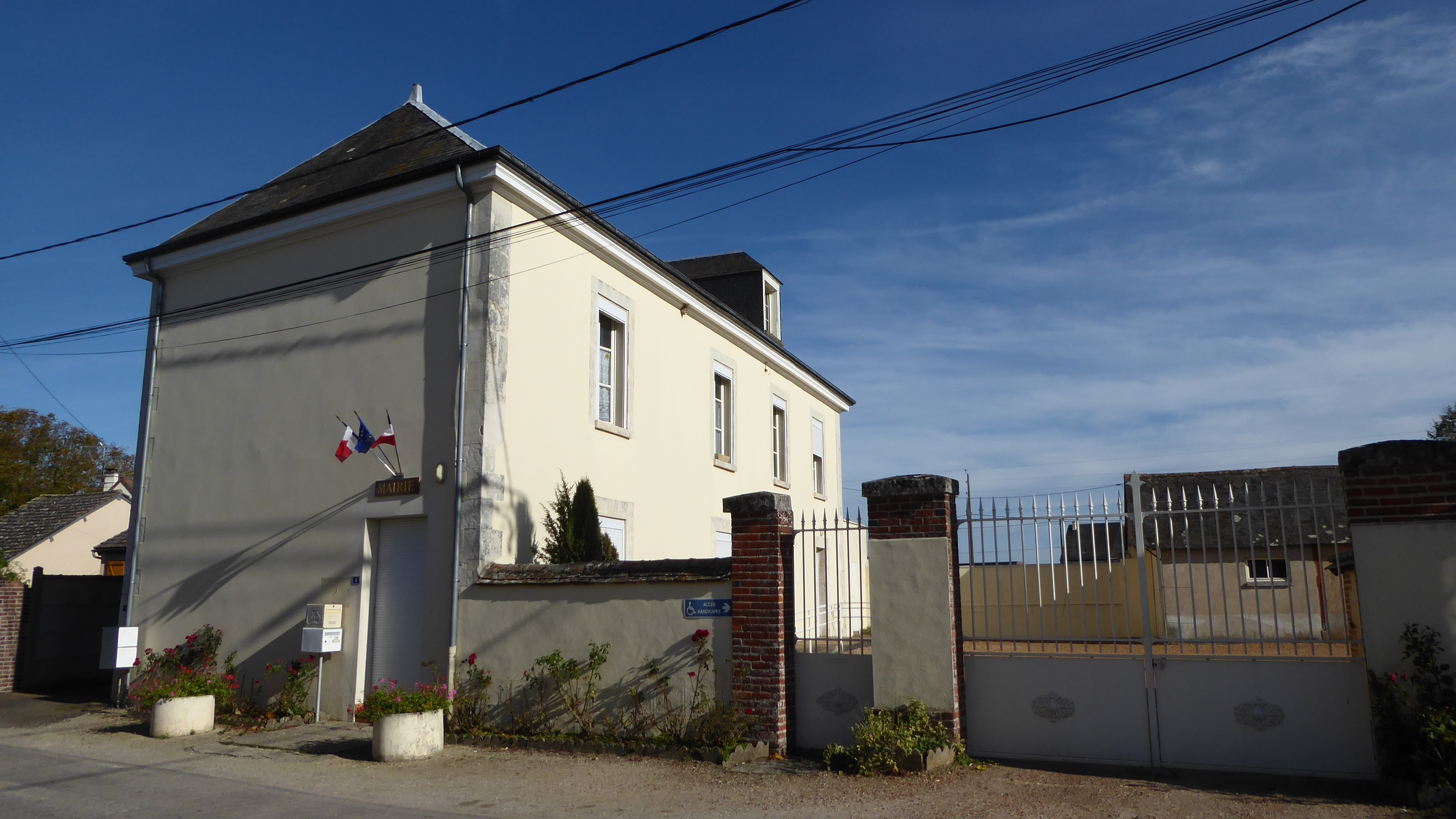
- Town hall
- Location of Flacey
- Location within France Location within Centre-Val de Loire
- Coordinates: 48°08′52″N 1°21′02″E
- Country: France
- Region: Centre-Val de Loire
- Department: Eure-et-Loir
- Arrondissement: Châteaudun
- Canton: Châteaudun
- Intercommunality: Bonnevalais

Government
  - Mayor (2020–2026): Bernard Gouin
- Area^{1}: 13.99 km^{2} (5.40 sq mi)
- Elevation: 157 m (515 ft)
- Highest elevation: 167 m (548 ft)
- Lowest elevation: 118 m (387 ft)
- Population (2023): 208
  - Density: 14.9/km^{2} (38.5/sq mi)
- Time zone: UTC+01:00 (CET)
  - Summer (DST): UTC+02:00 (CEST)
- INSEE/Postal code: 28153 /28800
- ^{1} French Land Register data, which excludes lakes, ponds, glaciers > 1 km^{2} (0.386 sq mi or 247 acres) and river estuaries.

Flacey (French pronunciation: [flasɛ]) is a commune in the Eure-et-Loir department in northern France.

== Population ==
Historical population
| Year | Pop. | ±% p.a. |
|---|---|---|
| 1968 | 161 | — |
| 1975 | 158 | −0.27% |
| 1982 | 184 | +2.20% |
| 1990 | 202 | +1.17% |
| 1999 | 193 | −0.51% |
| 2007 | 210 | +1.06% |
| 2012 | 221 | +1.03% |
| 2017 | 209 | −1.11% |
| 2023 | 208 | −0.08% |
Source: INSEE

== See also ==
- Communes of the Eure-et-Loir department
