= St. Maur =

St. Maur may refer to:

- Saint Maurus (512–584), Italian Roman Catholic saint
- Congregation of Saint Maur, French Benedictine congregation established in 1621
- Saint Maur International School, Yokohama, Japan, established in 1872
- Baron St Maur, in the peerage of England from 1314
- The Seymour family, an English family headed by the Duke of Somerset, including:
  - Edward St Maur, 11th Duke of Somerset (1775–1855)
  - Edward Seymour, 12th Duke of Somerset (1804–1885), First Lord of the Admiralty, created Earl St Maur
  - Ferdinand Seymour (1835–1869), son of the above, soldier, adopted Earl St Maur as a courtesy title
  - Archibald St Maur, 13th Duke of Somerset (1810–1891)
  - Algernon St Maur, 14th Duke of Somerset (1813–1894)
  - Algernon St Maur, 15th Duke of Somerset (1846–1923)
  - Susan St Maur, Duchess of Somerset (1853–1936), wife of the 15th Duke, Scottish writer and philanthropist
  - Harold St Maur (1869–1927), army officer and briefly Member of Parliament for Exeter

== See also ==
- Saint-Maur (disambiguation)
