= Saint-Maur =

Saint-Maur may refer to several communes in France:

- Saint-Maur, Cher, in the Cher département
- Saint-Maur, Gers, in the Gers département
- Saint-Maur, Indre, in the Indre département
- Saint-Maur, Jura, in the Jura département
- Saint-Maur, Oise, in the Oise département
- Saint-Maur-des-Bois, in the Manche département
- Saint-Maur-des-Fossés, in the Val-de-Marne département
- Saint-Maur-sur-le-Loir, in the Eure-et-Loir département

== See also ==
- St. Maur (disambiguation)
