= Canton of Châteaudun =

Administrative division of Eure-et-Loir, France

Coordinates: 48.07°N 1.33°E

The canton of Châteaudun is an administrative division of the Eure-et-Loir department, northern France. Its borders were modified at the French canton reorganisation which came into effect in March 2015. Its seat is in Châteaudun.

It consists of the following communes:

1. Alluyes
2. Bonneval
3. La Chapelle-du-Noyer
4. Châteaudun
5. Conie-Molitard
6. Dancy
7. Dangeau
8. Donnemain-Saint-Mamès
9. Flacey
10. Jallans
11. Logron
12. Marboué
13. Moléans
14. Montboissier
15. Montharville
16. Moriers
17. Saint-Christophe
18. Saint-Denis-Lanneray
19. Saint-Maur-sur-le-Loir
20. Saumeray
21. Thiville
22. Trizay-lès-Bonneval
23. Villampuy
24. Villemaury
25. Villiers-Saint-Orien
