= Saint-Maur-sur-le-Loir =

- Commune
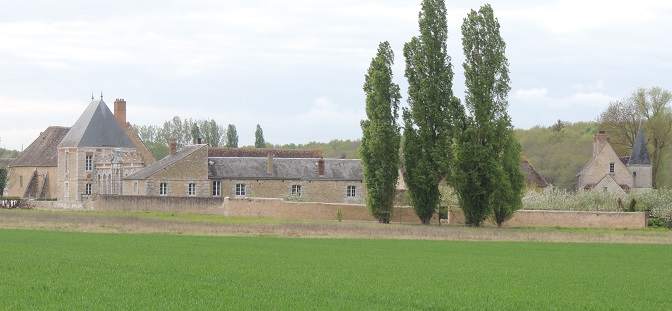
- The manor in Saint-Maur-sur-le-Loir
- Location of Saint-Maur-sur-le-Loir
- Location within France Location within Centre-Val de Loire
- Coordinates: 48°09′11″N 1°25′11″E
- Country: France
- Region: Centre-Val de Loire
- Department: Eure-et-Loir
- Arrondissement: Châteaudun
- Canton: Châteaudun
- Intercommunality: Bonnevalais

Government
  - Mayor (2020–2026): Nicole Hubert-Diger
- Area^{1}: 16.54 km^{2} (6.39 sq mi)
- Elevation: 135 m (443 ft)
- Highest elevation: 153 m (502 ft)
- Lowest elevation: 112 m (367 ft)
- Population (2023): 411
  - Density: 24.8/km^{2} (64.4/sq mi)
- Time zone: UTC+01:00 (CET)
  - Summer (DST): UTC+02:00 (CEST)
- INSEE/Postal code: 28353 /28800
- ^{1} French Land Register data, which excludes lakes, ponds, glaciers > 1 km^{2} (0.386 sq mi or 247 acres) and river estuaries.

Saint-Maur-sur-le-Loir (French pronunciation: [sɛ̃ mɔʁ syʁ lə lwaʁ], literally Saint-Maur on the Loir) is a commune in the Eure-et-Loir department in northern France.

== Population ==
Historical population
Year	Pop.	±% p.a.
1968	301	—
1975	267	−1.70%
1982	355	+4.15%
1990	324	−1.14%
1999	387	+1.99%
2007	380	−0.23%
2012	402	+1.13%
2017	413	+0.54%
2023	411	−0.08%
Source: INSEE

== See also ==
- Communes of the Eure-et-Loir department
