= Bonneval, Eure-et-Loir =

Bonneval
- Commune
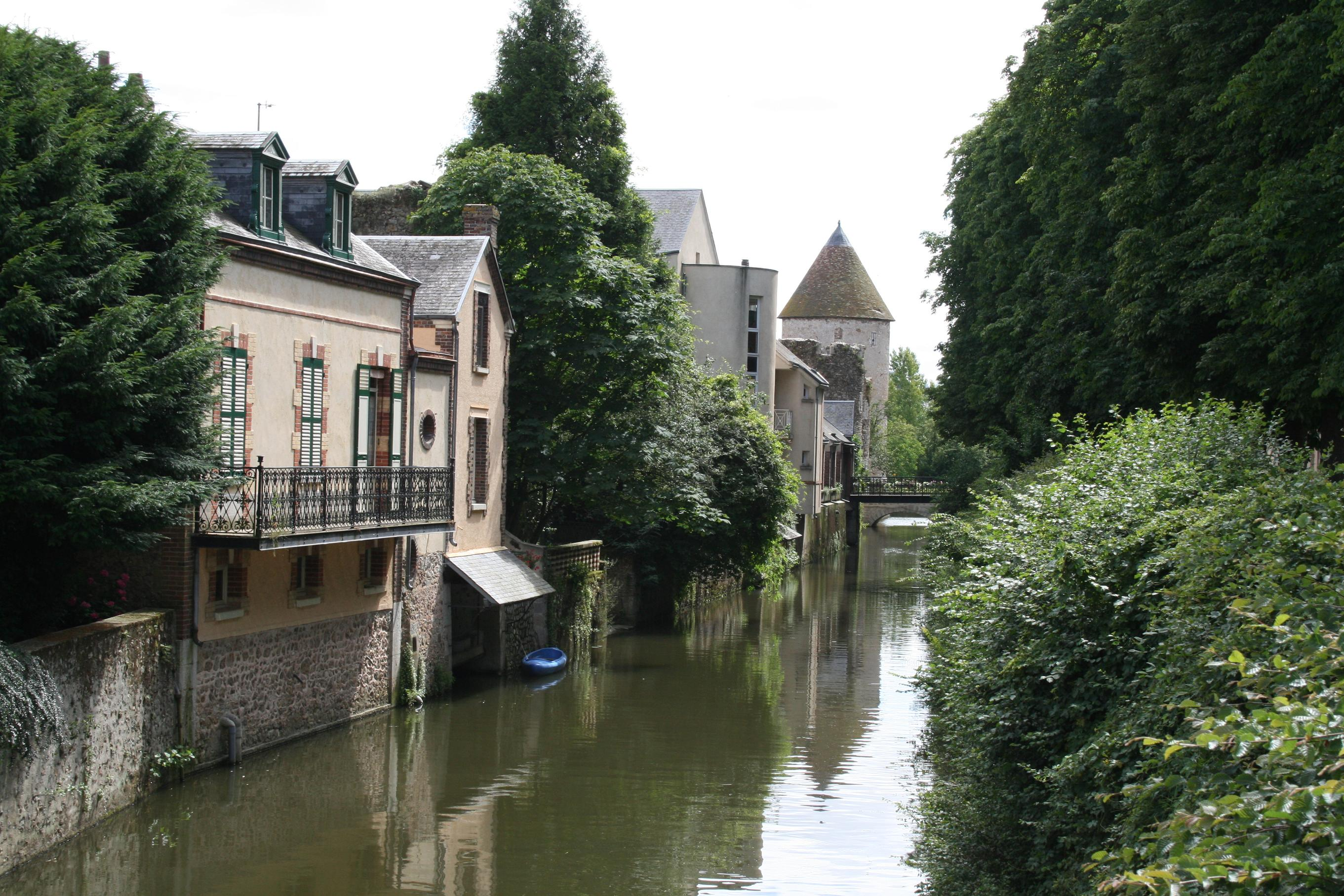
- A general view of Bonneval

- Coat of arms
- Location of Bonneval
- Location within France Location within Centre-Val de Loire
- Coordinates: 48°10′56″N 1°23′20″E
- Country: France
- Region: Centre-Val de Loire
- Department: Eure-et-Loir
- Arrondissement: Châteaudun
- Canton: Châteaudun
- Intercommunality: Bonnevalais

Government
  - Mayor (2023–2026): Eric Jubert
- Area^{1}: 28.82 km^{2} (11.13 sq mi)
- Elevation: 132 m (433 ft)
- Highest elevation: 175 m (574 ft)
- Lowest elevation: 112 m (367 ft)
- Population (2023): 4,868
  - Density: 168.9/km^{2} (437.5/sq mi)
- Time zone: UTC+01:00 (CET)
  - Summer (DST): UTC+02:00 (CEST)
- INSEE/Postal code: 28051 /28800
- ^{1} French Land Register data, which excludes lakes, ponds, glaciers > 1 km^{2} (0.386 sq mi or 247 acres) and river estuaries.

Bonneval (French pronunciation: [bɔnval]) is a commune in the Eure-et-Loir department in northern France.

The commune is listed as a Village étape.

== Population ==
Historical population

Year	Pop.	±% p.a.
1793	2,171	—
1800	1,551	−4.69%
1806	1,718	+1.72%
1821	1,779	+0.23%
1831	2,432	+3.18%
1836	2,560	+1.03%
1841	2,670	+0.84%
1846	2,869	+1.45%
1851	3,055	+1.26%
1856	3,004	−0.34%
1861	3,006	+0.01%
1866	3,486	+3.01%
1872	3,348	−0.67%
1876	3,398	+0.37%
1881	3,420	+0.13%
1886	3,631	+1.20%
1891	3,789	+0.86%
1896	3,818	+0.15%
1901	3,954	+0.70%

Year	Pop.	±% p.a.
1906	4,011	+0.29%
1911	3,991	−0.10%
1921	3,597	−1.03%
1926	3,616	+0.11%
1931	3,627	+0.06%
1936	3,699	+0.39%
1946	3,803	+0.28%
1954	4,296	+1.54%
1962	4,628	+0.93%
1968	4,853	+0.79%
1975	4,892	+0.11%
1982	4,864	−0.08%
1990	4,420	−1.19%
1999	4,285	−0.34%
2007	4,298	+0.04%
2012	4,757	+2.05%
2017	5,055	+1.22%
2023	4,868	−0.63%

Source: EHESS and INSEE (1968-2023)

== See also ==
- Communes of the Eure-et-Loir department
