= Auf der Maur =

Auf der Maur is a surname. Notable people with the surname include:

- Melissa Auf der Maur (born 1972), Canadian rock musician
  - Auf der Maur (album), debut album of Melissa Auf der Maur
- Nick Auf der Maur (1942–1998), Canadian journalist and politician

== See also ==
- Maur (disambiguation)
