= Alluyes =

- Commune
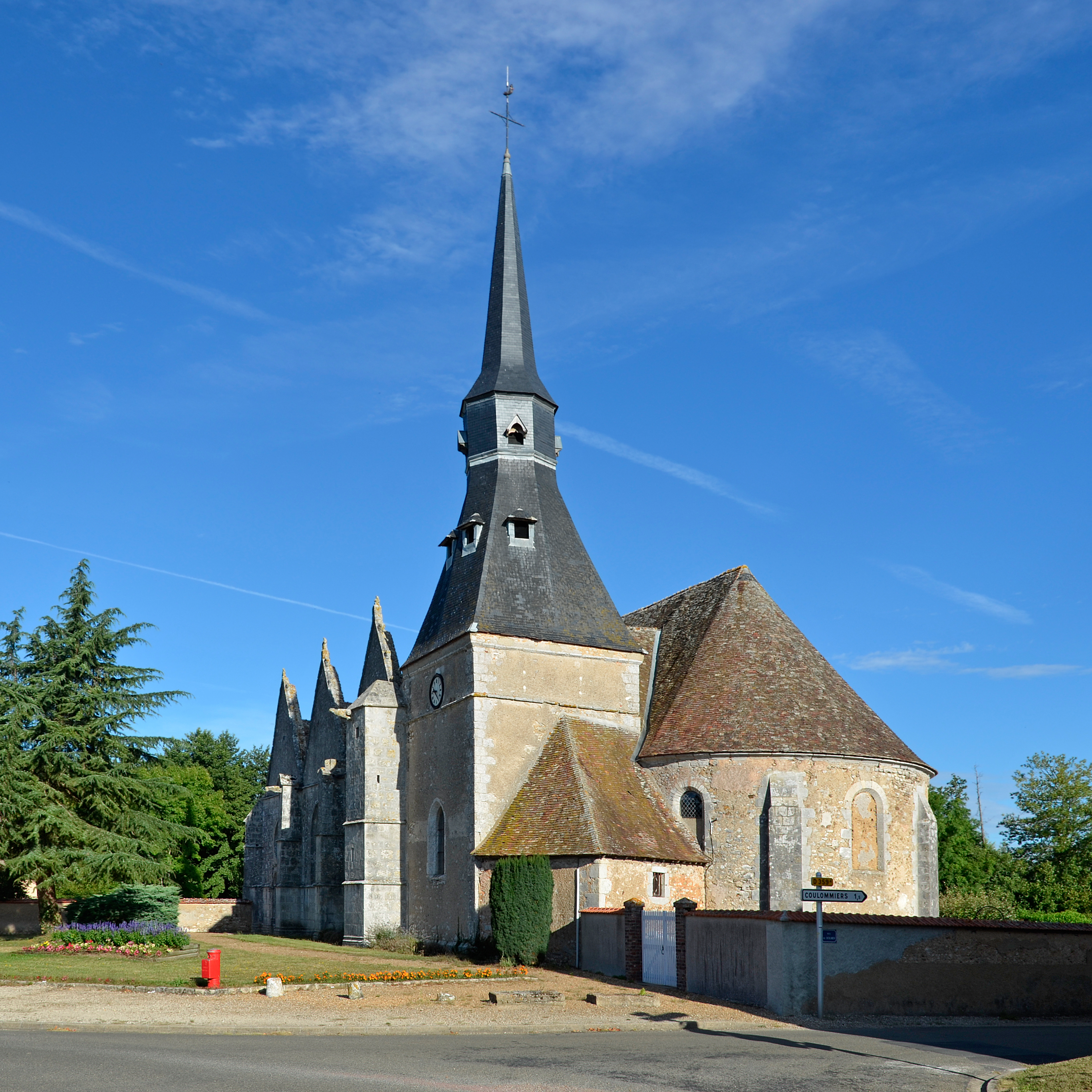
- The church in Alluyes
- Location of Alluyes
- Location within France Location within Centre-Val de Loire
- Coordinates: 48°13′47″N 1°21′42″E
- Country: France
- Region: Centre-Val de Loire
- Department: Eure-et-Loir
- Arrondissement: Châteaudun
- Canton: Châteaudun
- Intercommunality: Bonnevalais

Government
  - Mayor (2020–2026): Jean-Marc Petit
- Area^{1}: 19.58 km^{2} (7.56 sq mi)
- Elevation: 129 m (423 ft)
- Highest elevation: 154 m (505 ft)
- Lowest elevation: 121 m (397 ft)
- Population (2023): 756
  - Density: 38.6/km^{2} (100/sq mi)
- Time zone: UTC+01:00 (CET)
  - Summer (DST): UTC+02:00 (CEST)
- INSEE/Postal code: 28005 /28800
- ^{1} French Land Register data, which excludes lakes, ponds, glaciers > 1 km^{2} (0.386 sq mi or 247 acres) and river estuaries.

Alluyes (French pronunciation: [alɥi]) is a commune in the Eure-et-Loir department in northern France.

== Population ==
Historical population
Year	Pop.	±% p.a.
1968	720	—
1975	692	−0.57%
1982	548	−3.28%
1990	577	+0.65%
1999	619	+0.78%
2007	686	+1.29%
2012	762	+2.12%
2017	760	−0.05%
2023	756	−0.09%
Source: INSEE

== See also ==
- Communes of the Eure-et-Loir department
