= Tinayre =

Tinayre is a surname. Notable people with the surname include:

- Daniel Tinayre (1910–1994), Argentine director, screenwriter and producer
- Julien Tinayre (1859–1923), French illustrator and wood engraver
- Louis Tinayre (1861–1942), French illustrator and painter
- Marcelle Tinayre (1870–1948), French author
- Marguerite Tinayre (1831–1895), French educator, writer and socialist
