= Lumeau =

- Commune
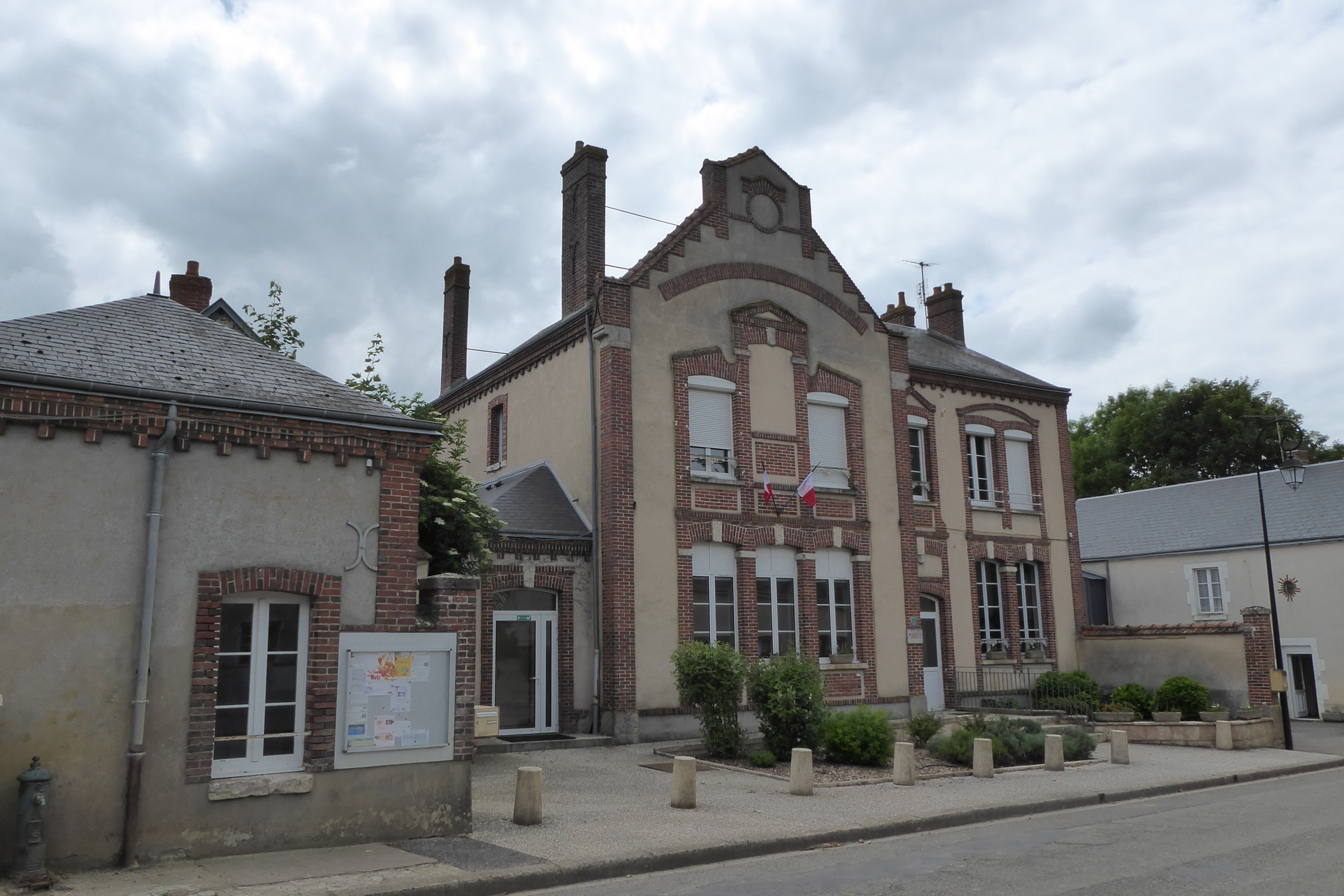
- The town hall and school in Lumeau
- Location of Lumeau
- Location within France Location within Centre-Val de Loire
- Coordinates: 48°07′00″N 1°47′11″E
- Country: France
- Region: Centre-Val de Loire
- Department: Eure-et-Loir
- Arrondissement: Châteaudun
- Canton: Les Villages Vovéens
- Intercommunality: Cœur de Beauce

Government
  - Mayor (2020–2026): Marc Langé
- Area^{1}: 15.28 km^{2} (5.90 sq mi)
- Elevation: 123 m (404 ft)
- Highest elevation: 134 m (440 ft)
- Lowest elevation: 120 m (390 ft)
- Population (2023): 138
  - Density: 9.03/km^{2} (23.4/sq mi)
- Time zone: UTC+01:00 (CET)
  - Summer (DST): UTC+02:00 (CEST)
- INSEE/Postal code: 28221 /28140
- ^{1} French Land Register data, which excludes lakes, ponds, glaciers > 1 km^{2} (0.386 sq mi or 247 acres) and river estuaries.

Lumeau (French pronunciation: [lymo]) is a commune in the Eure-et-Loir department in northern France, between Chartres and Orléans.

== Geography ==
Lumeau is situated in the Beauce agricultural plain, 27 km north from Orléans, 39 km north-east from Châteaudun, 50 km south of Chartres and 92 km south of Paris.

Map of Commune de Lumeau

== Geology and paleontology ==
The Beauce region is where lacustrine limestones were deposited from the Lutetian stratigraphic stage to the Aquitanian stage, on top of Cretaceous chalks. Spots of Orleanian sands from the Burdigalian stage appeared as well, and the whole region received wind-blown loess during Würm glaciation.

Since 1850, especially between 1883 et 1885 and notably in 1908, a large number of mammal fossils have been discovered in Orleanian sands in Lumeau (Burdigalian stage of Miocene). Most of them are displayed at the National Museum of Natural History (France), at the Muséum d'Orléans and at the Natural History Museum of Basel. Species discovered in the Orleanian sands at Lumeau include : teleoceras aurelianensis, mastodon turicensis, mastodon tapiroides, palaeomeryx kaupi, palaeomeryx, anchitherium aurelianensis, prolagus, steneofiber viciacensis, listriodon lockharti, hyotherium, palaeochoerus, pseudaelurus, genetta, ursidae, amphicyon, hyaenidae.

== History ==
Hundreds of artifacts from the Paleolithic (Mousterian) and Mesolithic ages have been found in Lumeau. Several remains of early farmer settlements, tumuli, megalithes from the Neolithic age have been discovered and studied, with influence from both the Atlantic Bronze Age and urnfield culture. Strong expansion is correlated with La Tène culture.

Lumeau has roots as a Gaulish village in the Carnutes territory. It was inhabited long before Roman times. Its name derives from the Gallic elm (Ulmus) and is of Celtic origin. This is the region where a key uprising against the Romans occurred in January 52 BC during the Gallic Wars. The territory of Lumeau is crossed by two old Roman roads and includes a Roman villa with hypocaust and several farms.

The crossing of the Rhine in year 406 resulted in settlements of Vandals, Alemanni and Alans as foederati in the neighbourhoods of Lumeau and their later integration with the local population. Attila and the Huns marched towards Orleans in year 450 but the region was protected by Flavius Aetius' Roman army with Alan auxiliary troops and Salian Franks allies.

Merovingian tombs and artifacts were discovered in the outskirts of the village. Lumeau is cited in an Act of Charles the Bald (about AD 877). Lumeau has been part of the Crown lands of France since year 980.

In Neuvilliers hamlet of Lumeau, a tomb was discovered nearby a farm, including a gallery and a circular room used from the late antiquity to the 12th century, which are part of a very important network dating from the Middle Ages.

During the Hundred Years' War, especially in 1361, the British and Burgundians occupied the nearby castle. Thomas Montagu, 4th Earl of Salisbury and his army occupied Lumeau in July 1428 on his way to the Siege of Orléans (1428–1429). Lumeau is in the northern neighbourhood of the battlefield of the Battle of Patay (18 June 1429).

During the French Wars of Religion, the church of Lumeau was burnt in 1562.

From 1785 to 1792 isolated farms suffered attacks from a criminal gang referred to as the 'Chauffeurs d'Orgères' (burners from Orgères).

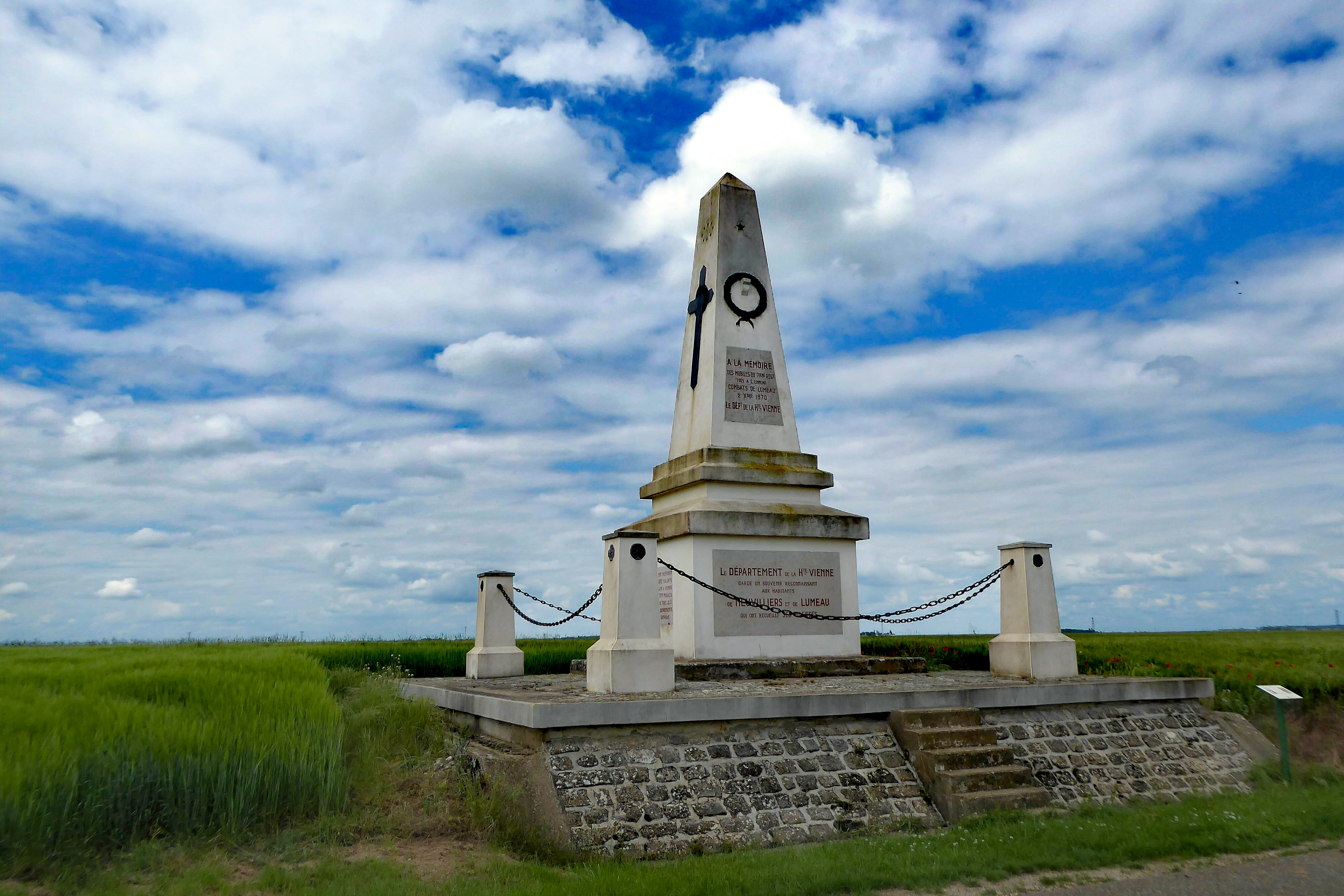
Ossuary (fight at Lumeau and Neuvilliers on 2 December 1870)

During the Franco-Prussian War of 1870, Lumeau was in the middle of the Loigny-Poupry battlefield, between the French Armée de la Loire and the Bavarian and Prussian troops. The battle spread over the municipalities of Guillonville, Loigny, Lumeau and Poupry on 2 December 1870. Lumeau was mainly involved in combat events from 29 November to 3 December 1870, while further rescue activities took place from 2 December 1870 to 18 February 1871.

A memorial was built in 1873 in Neuvilliers hamlet where French troops were stationed. It is a white obelisk with a height of eight meters over an ossuary (containing thousands of human remains) under a granite basement surrounded by a chain.

== Population ==
Historical population
Year	Pop.	±% p.a.
1968	297	—
1975	229	−3.65%
1982	194	−2.34%
1990	179	−1.00%
1999	177	−0.12%
2007	185	+0.55%
2012	184	−0.11%
2017	149	−4.13%
2023	138	−1.27%
Source: INSEE

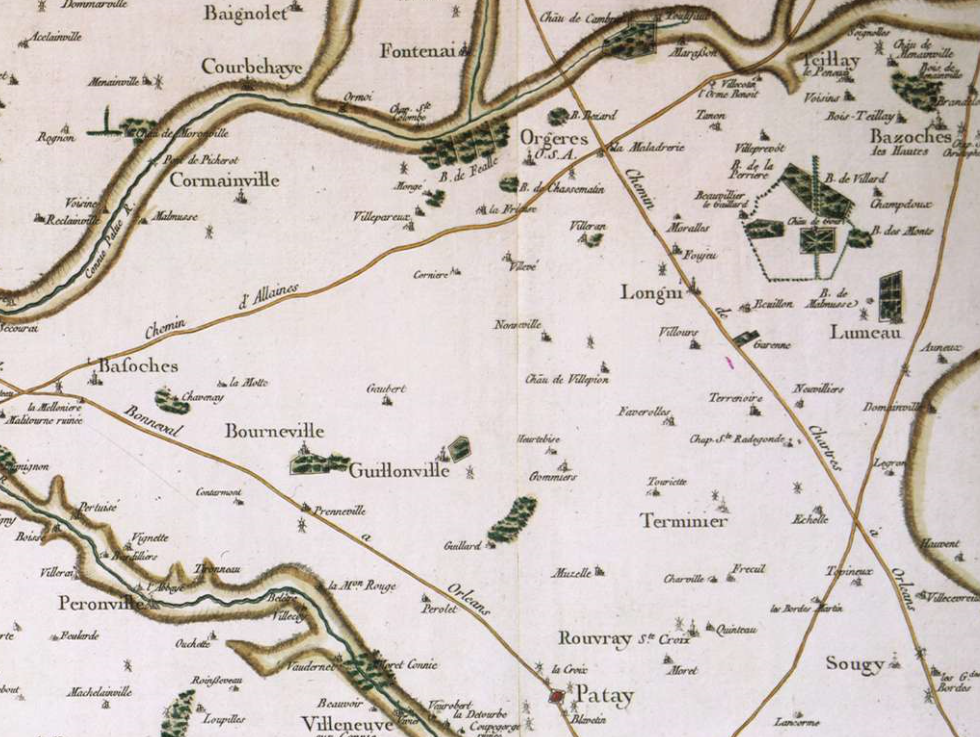
Extract from Cassini map (1757)

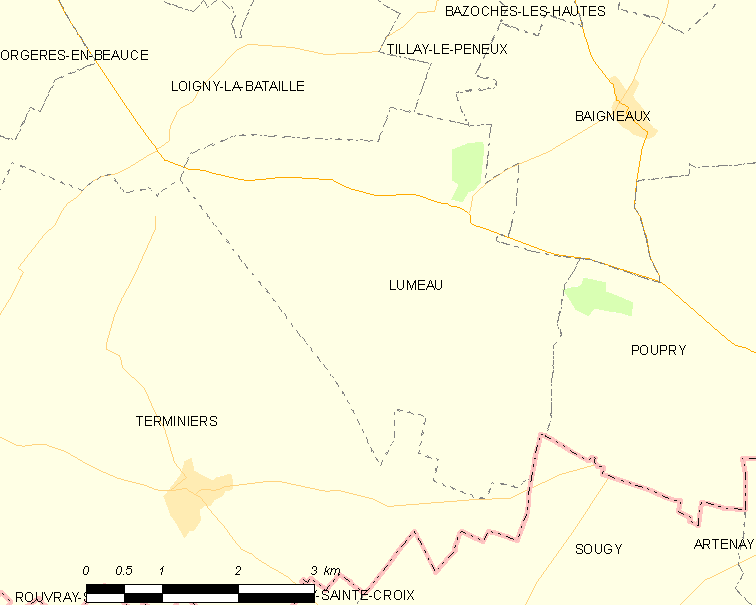
Map of Lumeau and neighbourhood (2012)

== Transport ==
The distances between Lumeau and its neighbouring towns are as follows:

- Loigny-la-Bataille 4 km
- Poupry 4 km
- Terminiers 5 km
- Artenay 8 km
- Orléans 27 km

Access:

- Road access from A10 autoroute (A10 motorway exit 13, 6 km east from Lumeau), from route nationale N20/D2020, from route nationale N154/D954, and from other roads (D10, D3.9, D19)
- Réseau de mobilité interurbaine (Remi Public transport): bus line 2 (Orléans- Chartres) and bus line 32B
- Train station at Artenay (8 km) : TER Centre-Val de Loire (line from Paris-Austerlitz to Orléans)
- 80 km south from Paris-Orly Airport

== See also ==
- Communes of the Eure-et-Loir department
- Battle of Patay (18th June 1429)
- Battle of Loigny–Lumeau-Poupry (2nd December 1870)
