= Lionel Royer =

French painter (1852–1926)

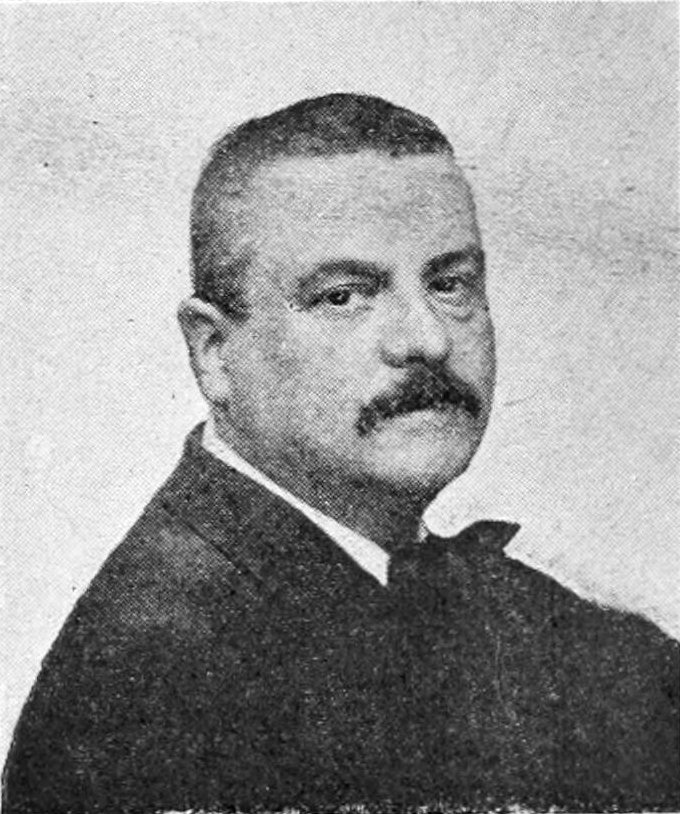
- Born: Lionel-Noël Royer; 25 December 1852; Château-du-Loir, France
- Died: 30 June 1925 (aged 72); Neuilly-sur-Seine, France
- Education: École nationale supérieure des Beaux-Arts

Lionel-Noël Royer (25 December 1852 – 30 June 1926) was a French painter. He was most famous for painting large scenes of the life of Joan of Arc in the Basilica of Bois-Chenu in Domrémy.

== Life and work ==
Lionel Royer was born in Château-du-Loir in Sarthe on 25 December 1852. He volunteered before his 18th birthday for the Franco-Prussian War and took part in the Battle of Loigny-Poupry on 2 December 1870 under the command of General Athanase Charette de la Contrie. Charette, having noticed Royer's artistic talent, offered to finance his studies at the École nationale supérieure des Beaux-Arts in Paris.

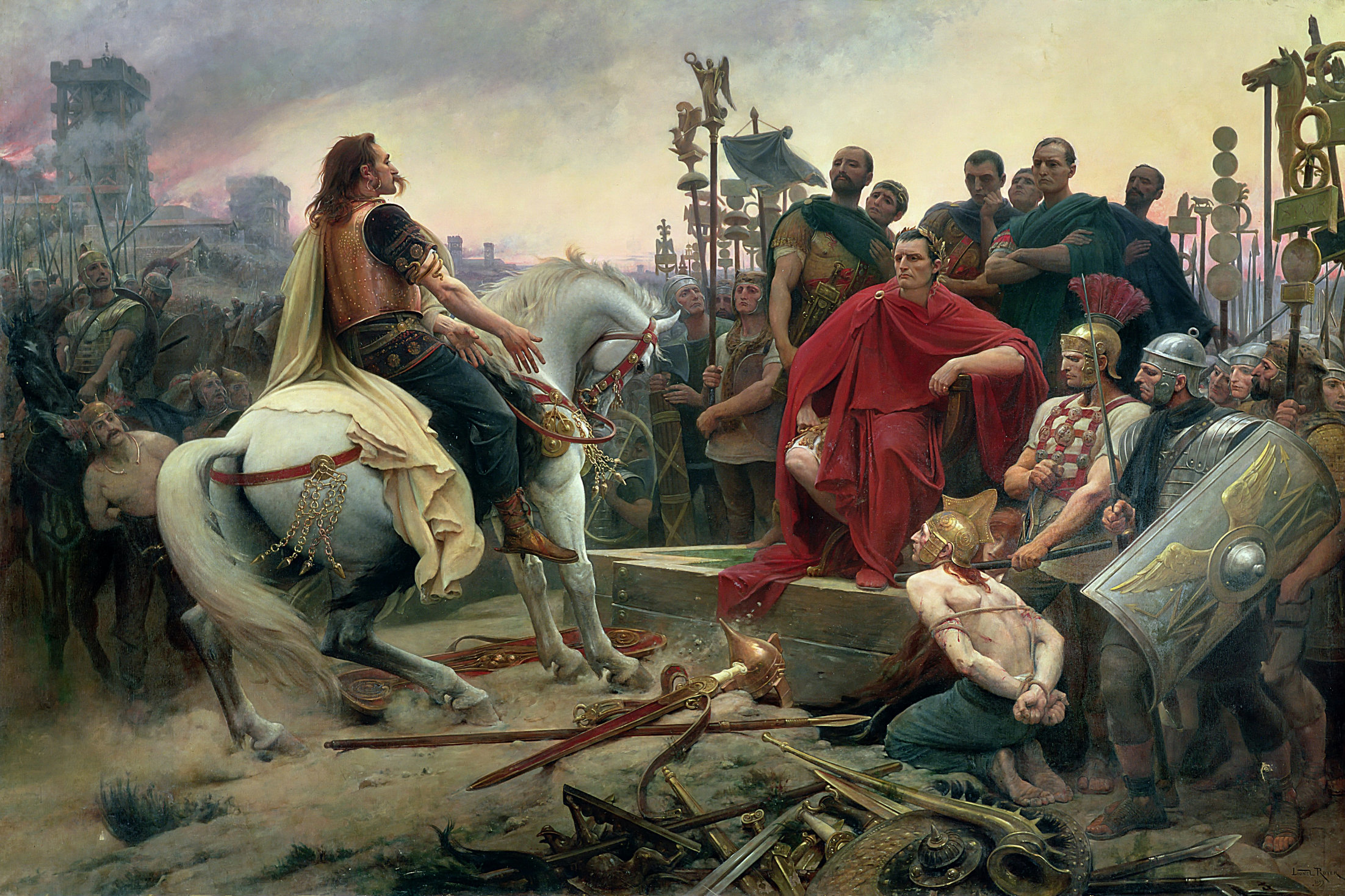
Vercingetorix Throws Down his Arms at the Feet of Julius Caesar (1899), Crozatier Museum at Le Puy-en-Velay

Royer became a pupil of Alexandre Cabanel and of William-Adolphe Bouguereau. He obtained the Prix de Rome in 1882. He became a portraitist and, especially, a painter of historical scenes. His best-known works are Vercingétorix Throwing his Weapons at the Feet of Caesar (1899), and the decoration of the Basilica of Domrémy dedicated to Joan of Arc. In illustrated supplements of newspapers of the era, he was a commentator on current affairs, in particular supplying drawings of Alfred Dreyfus in his prison or Auguste Comte and his three muses.

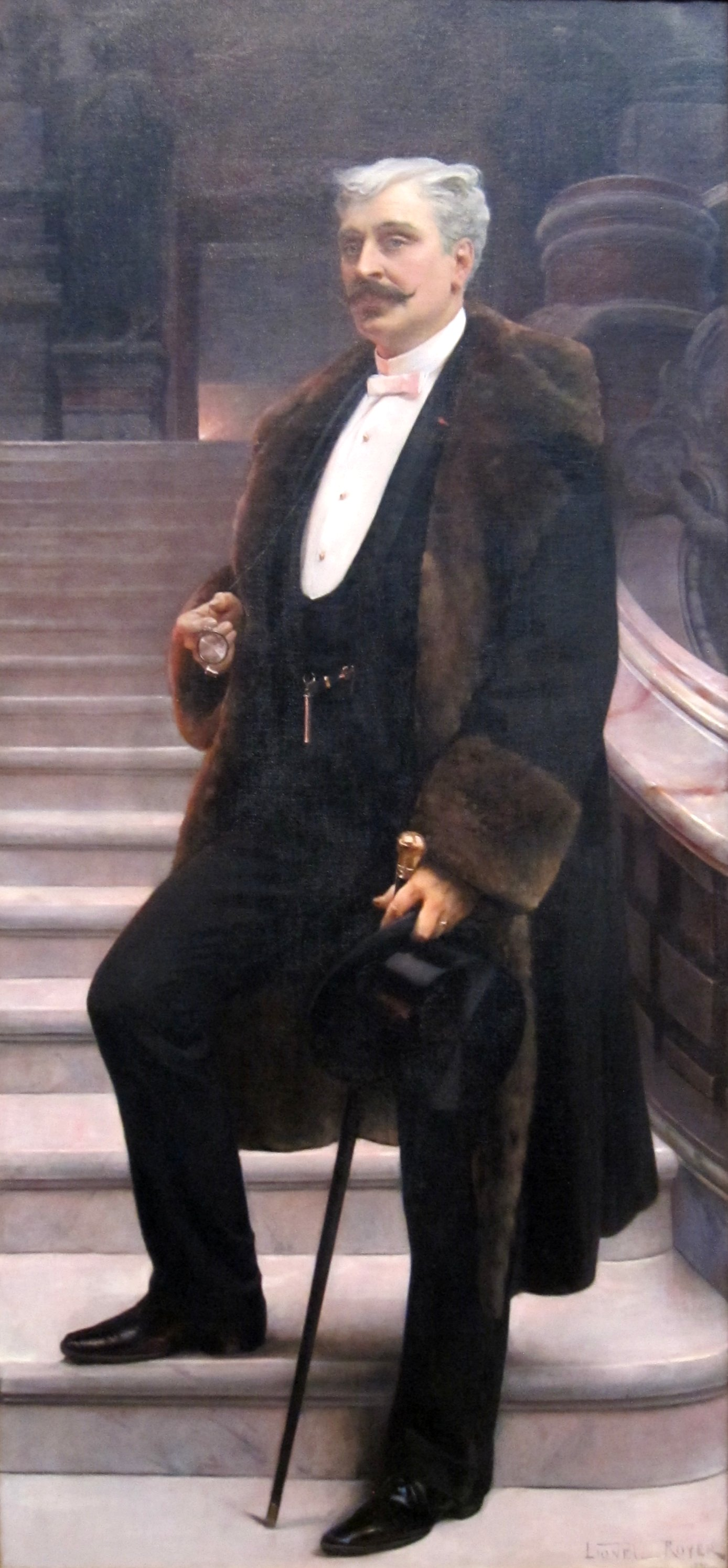
Portrait of Comte d'Adhémar de Cransac. Oil on canvas, c. 1890, in the Dayton Art Institute

In memory of his participation in the battle of Loigny, he donated two paintings to the rebuilt church of this village, the first representing the mass attended by the volunteers before leaving for the battle and the second depicting the nocturnal agony of the severely wounded General de Sonis on the battlefield. In 1897, he made a gift to the Société historique et archéologique du Maine (of which he was a member, as was fellow artist Albert Maignan) of ten watercolors depicting the Life of Joan of Arc, which had been unsuccessful entries in a contest of 1893 for new designs for windows in Orléans Cathedral.

"The battle scenes at Orléans before the fortress or at Compiègne offer Royer, the painter of historical scenes, an opportunity to demonstrate his skill in composition, with the tangle of armour-clad bodies and the play of lances. To elicit emotion, both allegory and the marvellous come to the aid of history. [...] Lionel Royer relies heavily on the precise depiction of historical sites. [...] Joan, alone in the foreground, is the means by which a possible reconciliation between the political and religious spheres is suggested. [...] By the evocative synthesis he achieves and the deep feeling he introduces here, the painter leaves interpretation open to each observer." (Chantal Bouchon - Revue Historique et Archéologique du Maine)

Royer reprised this Johannic iconography (assisted by Charles Lorin of Chartres, master glazier) at the basilica of Domrémy. In the window entitled Dépôt de l’épée de Fierbois par un ange, the face of Jean Poton de Xaintrailles bears the features of the architect Paul Sédille.

"Despite indications of the influence of the figures by Raphaelesque and Ingresesque reminiscences, these windows have a connotation of appeals to vengeance, in the vicinity of Domrémy, so charged with symbolic significance." (Chantal Bouchon - Revue Historique et Archéologique du Maine)

Royer had two daughters and a son. The son, who planned to become a priest, was injured in World War I and died shortly after. The two girls raised families in France and Belgium. Lionel Royer died in Neuilly-sur-Seine on 30 June 1926.

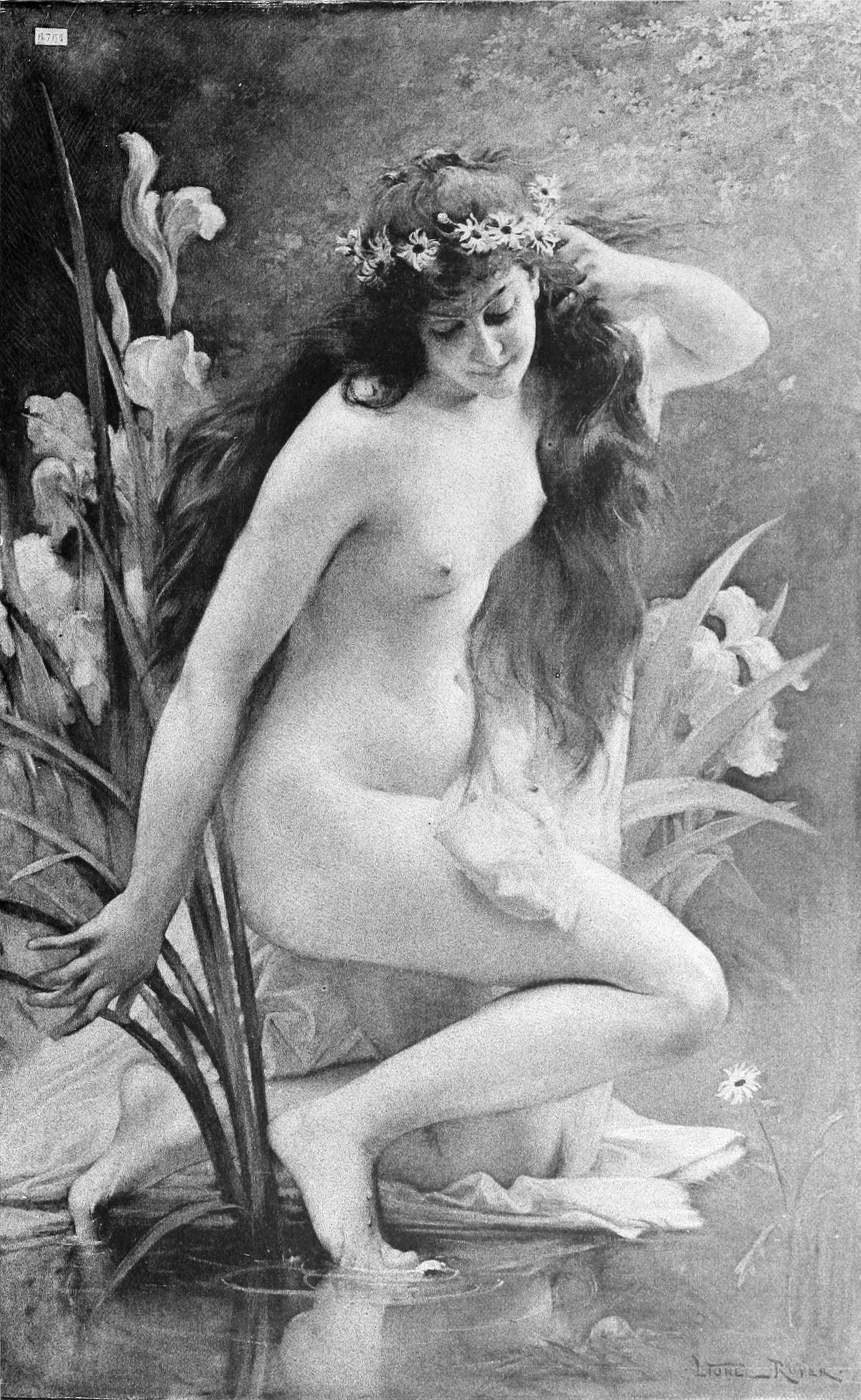
La Source (Published in Salon illustré 1888)

== Bibliography ==
- "Peindre l’Histoire – Lionel Royer" in Revue Historique et Archéologique du Maine, Le Mans, 1998 (including 10 scenes from Vie de Jeanne d’Arc by Lionel Royer: Domrémy, Vaucouleurs, Chinon, Orléans, Reims, Compiègne, Rouen).
- Chantal Bouchon, "Verrières de Jeanne d'Arc – Participation des artistes manceaux aux Concours d'Orléans à la fin du XIX^{e} siècle: Eugène Hucher, Albert Maignan, Lionel Royer", in Revue Historique et Archéologique du Maine, Le Mans, 1998, 3^{e} série T.18, tome CXLIX de la Collection, p. 241-256
