= Charles Lorin =

French stained glass artist (1866–1940)

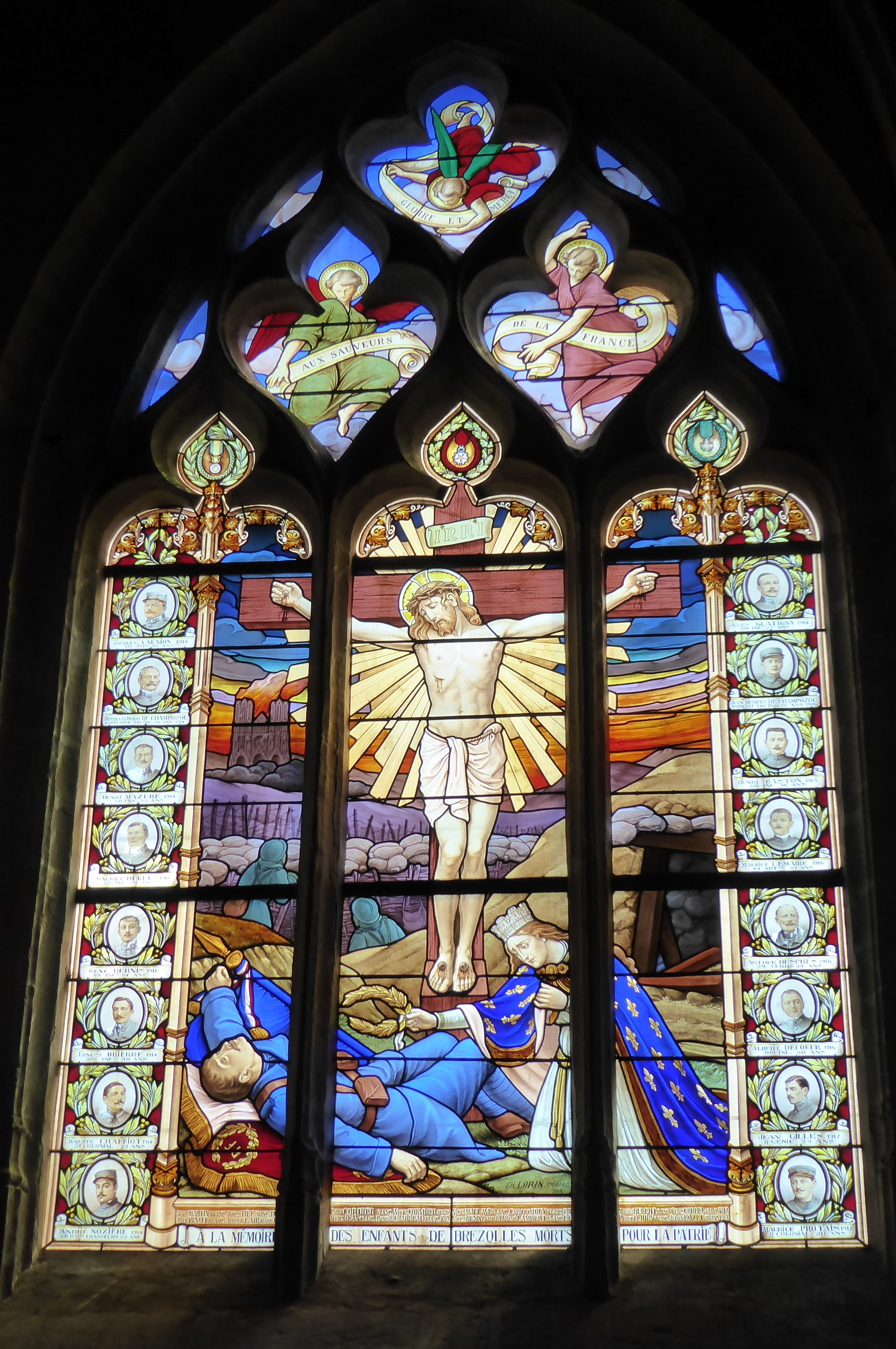
- "In memory of the children of Brezolles who died for their country," 1922.
- Born: Jean Baptiste Charles Claude Lorin; October 16, 1866; Chartres, France
- Died: April 23, 1940 (aged 73); Chartres
- Spouse: Étiennette Jeanne Piébourg
- Patrons: Nicolas Lorin (father)
- Website: www.avcel.net/maison-lorin

Charles Jean Baptiste Claude Lorin was a French glass painter and manufacturer. He was born on October 16, 1866, in Chartres, the capital of the Eure-et-Loir department in France, and died in the same city on April 23, 1940.

== About ==
Charles Lorin was the son of Nicolas Lorin (1833 – 1882) and Marie Françoise Dian (1840 – 1928). His father founded the Maison Lorin in Chartres in 1863.

Charles married Étiennette Jeanne Piébourg (1873 – 1944) on January 18, 1898. Étiennette was the daughter of Alfred Étienne Piébourg, who was the architect of the city of Chartres. Charles' first son, Charles Étienne François, born in November 1898, died at the age of 18 during World War I on a battlefield in Belgium. Charles Lorin took part in decorating war memorials, such as the stained glass windows of the Brezolles and Le Puiset churches. In 1900, Charles had a second son, François Lorin (1900 – 1972), who continued his father's work after World War II.

His first signed work dates back to 1899. He continued producing works for more than 40 years, until his death in 1940.

== Commissions ==
=== Commissions by Charles Lorin, 1899–1929 ===
- The Basilica of Bois Chenu of Domrémy-la-Pucelle (Vosges) has three windows made in 1899 in association with the painter Lionel Royer.
- The St. Christopher Church of Baron (Gironde) is decorated with stained glass windows made in 1900.
- Church of St. Peter of Épiniac, Ille-et-Vilaine, France (1904): built by architect Arthur Regnault, this church is decorated with 14 skylights listed in the general inventory of cultural heritage (00, 03-14 And 16 bays).
- St. Jean Baptiste Roman Catholic Church, New York (1912–1914): as a result of World War I, the installation of these windows did not take place until 1920.
- Chartres Cathedral, Eure-et-Loir (France):
  - 1919: restoration of the 12th century West Rose Window.
  - 1921: restoration of two 13th-century stained glass windows in the ambulatory: Saint James the Greater (bay 5) and Charlemagne (bay 7).
  - 1924: creation in the southwest transept of a grisaille and installation of a fragment of the resurrection of Lazarus, dating from the late fifteenth century or the early sixteenth century. (Bay 34)
- The St. Aubin church of Pleines-Œuvres (Calvados) has four commemorative figured glass windows made in 1920.
- The St. Stephen church of Janville (Eure-et-Loir) has a 1921 oculus (Bay 16), listed in the French general inventory of cultural heritage.
- Charles Lorin was selected for the Notre Dame de Lorette basilica in Ablain St.-Nazaire French Military Cemetery. He worked with Henri Pinta, one of the decorators of the basilica of Montmartre (1925).
- For the Riverside Church in New York City, Lorin was selected to create the glass for the clerestory windows in the nave. Lorin designed the stained glass windows on the western side of the clerestory (1927-1930).
- Charles Lorin installed the Art Deco stained glass windows in the nave (need date) of Notre-Dame-de-Clignancourt church in Paris.
- http://www.cheminsdememoire.gouv.fr/en/memorial-battles-marne-dormans

=== Commissions by Charles Lorin and Co., 1930–1940 ===
==== Associates ====
During this period, Charles Lorin engaged many painters to work with him including Charles Alexandre Crauk, M.Dano, Jondot, Gabriel Loire, Henri-Marcel Magne, and Henri Pinta.

== Publication ==
Charles Lorin published several articles in 1906 with respect to the 50th anniversary of the Archaeological Society of Eure-et-Loir (in French):

- Stained glass windows of the Middle Ages, those of Chartres, in particular
- Stained glass windows of the Renaissance
- 12th century medallion in St. Peter's Church of Chartres

== See also ==
=== Related articles ===
- Chartres Cathedral
- Stained glass
- Came glasswork

=== External links ===
- Maison Lorin - Vitraux d'art depuis 1863 by Élodie Vally, 2020 (in French)
- Nicholas Lorin & Henry Ely, Patrick Clark, Sunlites Stained Glass, Humanities & Social Sciences Online, 2007. Retrieved 15 January 2017
- The Maison Lorin, on the site http://www.marcmaison.com. Retrieved 15 January 2017
- List of 187 references with Charles Lorin in the Base Palissy, French Ministry of Culture (in French)
