= Battle of Loigny–Poupry =

Coordinates: 48.1239°N 1.7339°E

- Part of the Franco-Prussian War
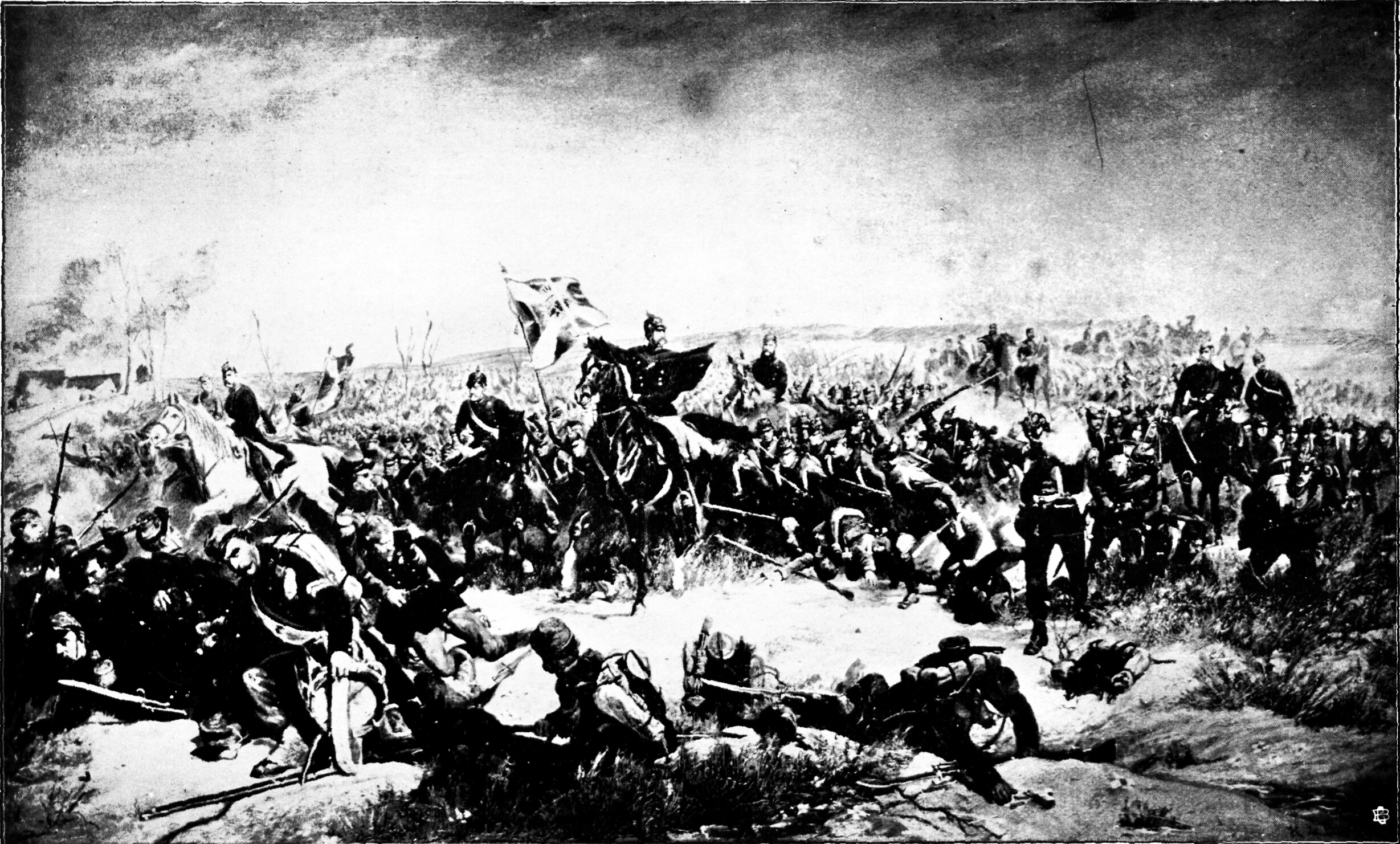
- Hugo von Kottwitz with the Lübecker Bataillon
Date	2 December 1870
Location	Loigny-la-Bataille, France
Result	German victory

Belligerents
North German Confederation: Prussia; Bavaria	French Republic

Commanders and leaders
Friedrich Franz II	Antoine Chanzy

Strength
35,000	45,000

Casualties and losses
4,139	6,000–7,000; 3,500–4,500 killed or wounded 2,500 captured

The Battle of Loigny–Lumeau-Poupry was a battle of the Franco-Prussian War. It took place on 2 December 1870 during the Loire Campaign on a frontline between Loigny, Lumeau and Poupry. During the battle, the Royal Bavarian 10th Infantry Regiment, "King Ludwig" had to evade the attacking French. During operations following the recapture of Orléans in early December 1870, German forces secured their flanks while preparing for renewed fighting along the Loire, culminating in the Battle of Beaugency on 8–9 December.

After the Battle of Villepion, an army detachment (Armee-Abteilung) under the command of Friedrich Franz II, Grand Duke of Mecklenburg-Schwerin, engaged the French Army of the Loire and defeated them.The French force was led by General Antoine Chanzy (16th corps d'armée), supported in the afternoon by General Gaston de Sonis (17th corps d'armée).

The next day, the Second Battle of Orléans (1870) began.

== Sources ==
- Chisholm, Hugh, ed. (1911). "Orleans § The Orleans Campaign of 1870" . Encyclopædia Britannica. Vol. 20 (11th ed.). Cambridge University Press. pp. 287–288.
- Wawro, Geoffrey (2003). The Franco-Prussian War: The German Conquest of France in 1870–1871. Cambridge and New York: Cambridge University Press. ISBN 978-0-52161-743-7.
