= Johann Baptist Stephan =

Royal Bavarian general

Johann von Stephan
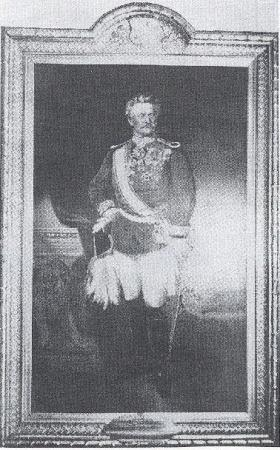
- Born: November 12, 1808; Schwarzhofen, Upper Palatinate, Bavaria
- Died: August 29, 1875 (aged 66); Schlehdorf, Upper Bavaria, Bavaria, Germany
- Military career
- Allegiance: Bavaria; Greece
- Branch: Bavarian Army; Hellenic Army
- Rank: General of the Infantry
- Conflicts: Austro-Prussian War: Battle of Kissingen; Battle of Helmstadt; Franco-Prussian War: Battle of Wörth; Battle of Sedan; Battle of Villepion (WIA)

Johann Baptist Ritter von Stephan (1808–1875), also known as Baptist von Stephan, was a Bavarian General of the Infantry who took part in the Austro-Prussian War and Franco-Prussian War and became a known Bavarian military figure during the 19th century for his efforts.

== Family ==
He was the son of the geometer Johann Baptist Stephan and his wife Maria Anna, née Bauriedl. Stephan himself remained unmarried.

== Military career ==
Stephan joined the Bavarian Army on July 9, 1824, as a volunteer in the 7th Infantry Regiment "Prinz Leopold" and was promoted to vice corporal on November 1, 1824, and to corporal on January 1, 1825. He was then appointed Junker in the 11th Infantry Regiment "von derr Tann" on August 13, 1831, Stephan was promoted to second lieutenant in the 7th Infantry Regiment on June 27, 1832. On July 18, he was exchanged for the 3rd Infantry Regiment "Prinz Karl". From June 18, 1833, Stephan was preparing for a detachment to Greece and therefore discharged from military service on July 21, 1833. He then joined the Greek Army as a lieutenant.

At his request, he was released from Greek service in 1837 and, after his return on August 20, 1837, was re-employed as a second lieutenant in the 11th Infantry Regiment "Delamotte" of the Bavarian Army. From September 23, 1837, as a result of an exchange with the 5th Infantry Regiment "Heritage Grand Duke of Hesse", he was transferred to the Infantry Body Regiment on March 30, 1838. On October 25, 1842, he was promoted to lieutenant in the 3rd Infantry Regiment, appointed on December 4, 1842, to the adjutant of the Major General and Brigadier Friedrich Ritter von Greis and in this capacity on May 22, 1842, transferred to the Infantry Life Regiment. On October 31, 1845, he was transferred to the Quartermaster General Staff. Stephan was promoted to captain on April 7, 1847, and was promoted to captain on March 31, 1848, and at the same time was transferred to the War Ministry of Bavaria. On December 21, 1848, he was promoted to major and was chosen to be adjutant to Prince Karl Theodor of Bavaria. He was then promoted to major as such on June 30, 1851, he was transferred to the 3rd Infantry Regiment "Prinz Karl" on October 9, 1852, where he was promoted to lieutenant colonel on April 17, 1853, and to colonel in the 3rd Infantry on March 31, 1855 - Regiment "Prinz Karl" promoted. On January 1, 1860, he received the Knight's Cross, First Class, of the Order of Saint Michael.

Stephan was promoted to major general on August 4, 1861, he assumed command of the Royal Bavarian 2nd Infantry Brigade. During the Austro-Prussian War, Stephan was temporarily given command of the mobile 1st Infantry Division and took part with it in the Battle of Kissingen on July 10, 1866, and at the Battle of Helmstadt on July 25, 1866. After promotion to lieutenant general on August 17, 1866, Stephan was awarded the Grand Commander's Cross of the Order of Military Merit on August 20, 1866. On August 29, 1866, he was promoted to General Commander of Nuremberg and on January 8, 1869, was appointed to commander of the 1st Division. On December 29, 1869, he was honored with the Knight's Cross of the Order of Merit of the Bavarian Crown, which was associated with elevation to the personal nobility.

Stephan took part in the Franco-Prussian War as commander of the 1st Division / 1st Army Corps and distinguished himself particularly in the battles of Wörth, Sedan and on the Loire. For his military services in the Battle of Wörth on August 6, 1870, he was expressly praised in the army order of August 30, 1870 and was awarded the Iron Cross, II Class and on October 18, 1870, the Grand Cross of the Military Merit Order. In addition, he spoke on November 2, 1870, under the chairmanship of the General of Infantry and commanding general of the II Army Corps under the leadership Jakob von Hartmann and held the Order Chapter unanimously that he was worthy of admission to the Order because of the excellent leadership of his division in the Battle of Wörth. By November 15, 1870, he was appointed Knight of the Military Order of Max Joseph. He also received the Iron Cross, First Class, and the Grand Ducal Mecklenburg Military Merit Cross, First Class, during the campaign. At Villepon, on December 1, 1870, he was so badly wounded by a Chassepot bullet in the abdomen and by shrapnel in the chest that he had to relinquish command of the division and be taken back to Munich.

On April 11, 1873, his resignation was approved and he was posthumously given the rank of General of the Infantry because of his many years of loyal service.
