= Louis Tinayre =

French illustrator and painter

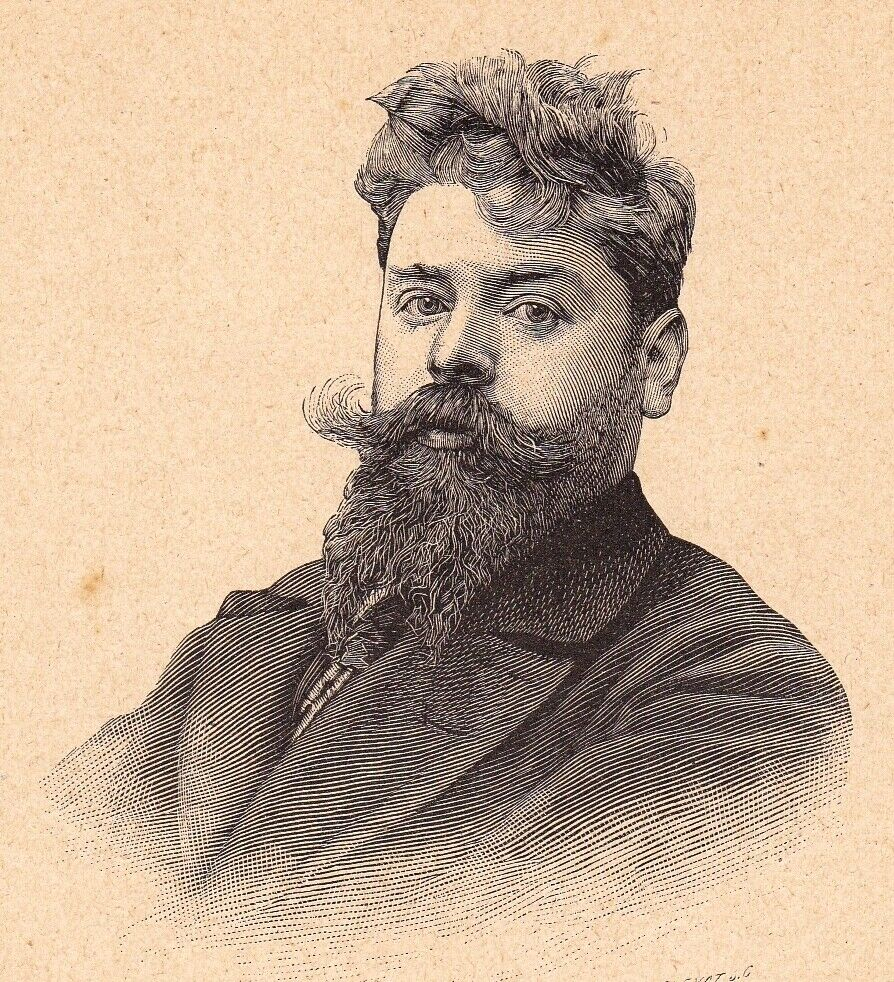
- Born: 14 March 1861; Neuilly-sur-Seine, France
- Died: 26 September 1942 (aged 81); Grosrouvre, Yvelines, France
- Education: Hungarian University of Fine Arts
- Occupation: Painter
- Parent: Victoire Tinayre
- Relatives: Julien Tinayre (brother); Marcelle Tinayre (sister-in-law)

Louis Tinayre (1861 – 26 September 1942) was a French illustrator and painter. He is remembered for his panoramas and dioramas of Madagascar, and for his paintings of Albert I, Prince of Monaco hunting.

== Early life ==
Louis Tinayre was born on 14 March 1861 in Neuilly-sur-Seine near Paris. His mother, Victoire, was a schoolteacher and a member of the International Workingmen's Association. His family, who was from Issoire, fled to Budapest, Hungary in the wake of the Paris Commune of 1871.

Tinayre graduated from the Hungarian University of Fine Arts in Budapest.

== Career ==
Tinayre began his career as an illustrator for the French press. He became known as a draughtsman and painter of animals. In 1895, he became a correspondent for Le Monde Illustré, and he covered the Second Madagascar expedition. His panoramas and dioramas of Madagascar were exhibited at the Universal Exhibition of 1900 in Paris.

From 1901 onwards, he joined Albert I, Prince of Monaco on his hunts and painted those scenes in North Africa, Russia, the Far West (Wyoming) and the North Pole.

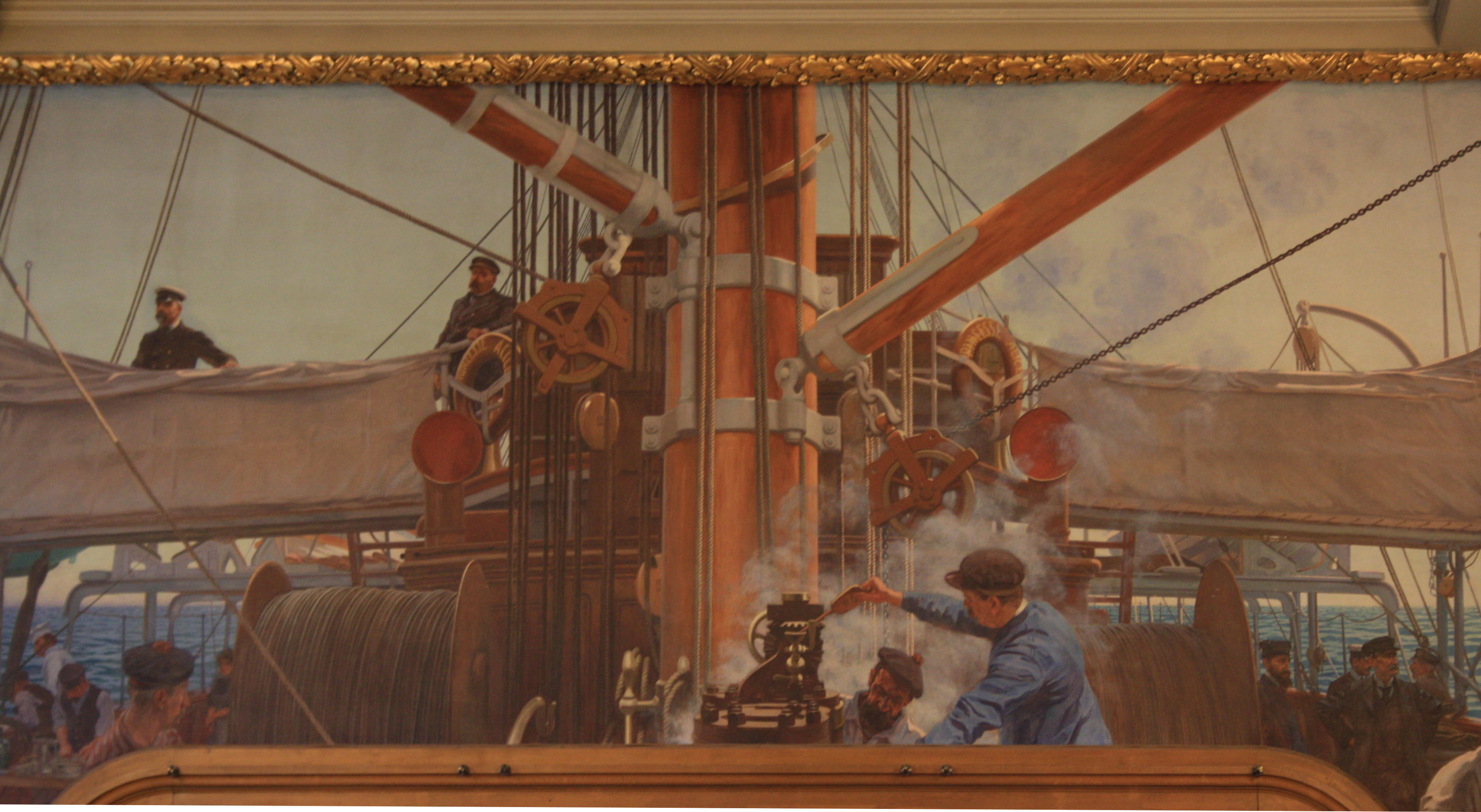
Institut océanographique de Paris, Fresco of the Grand Amphitheater.

With the painter Alexandre Jean-Baptiste Brun, he realized the four frescos of the Grand Amphitheater of the Oceanographic Institute of Paris. Louis Tinayre painted the characters while Alexander Brun, depicted the sea and the rigging.

Tinayre donated his paintings to the city of Issoire in 1939.

== Death and legacy ==
Tinayre died on 26 September 1942 in Grosrouvre near Paris.

His paintings were first exhibited posthumously at the Musée du Ranquet in Clermont-Ferrand in 2006. His paintings of Prince Albert I were exhibited once again at the Musée de la Chasse et de la Nature in Paris from 30 March to 24 July 2016.
