= Alexandre Jean-Baptiste Brun =

French painter

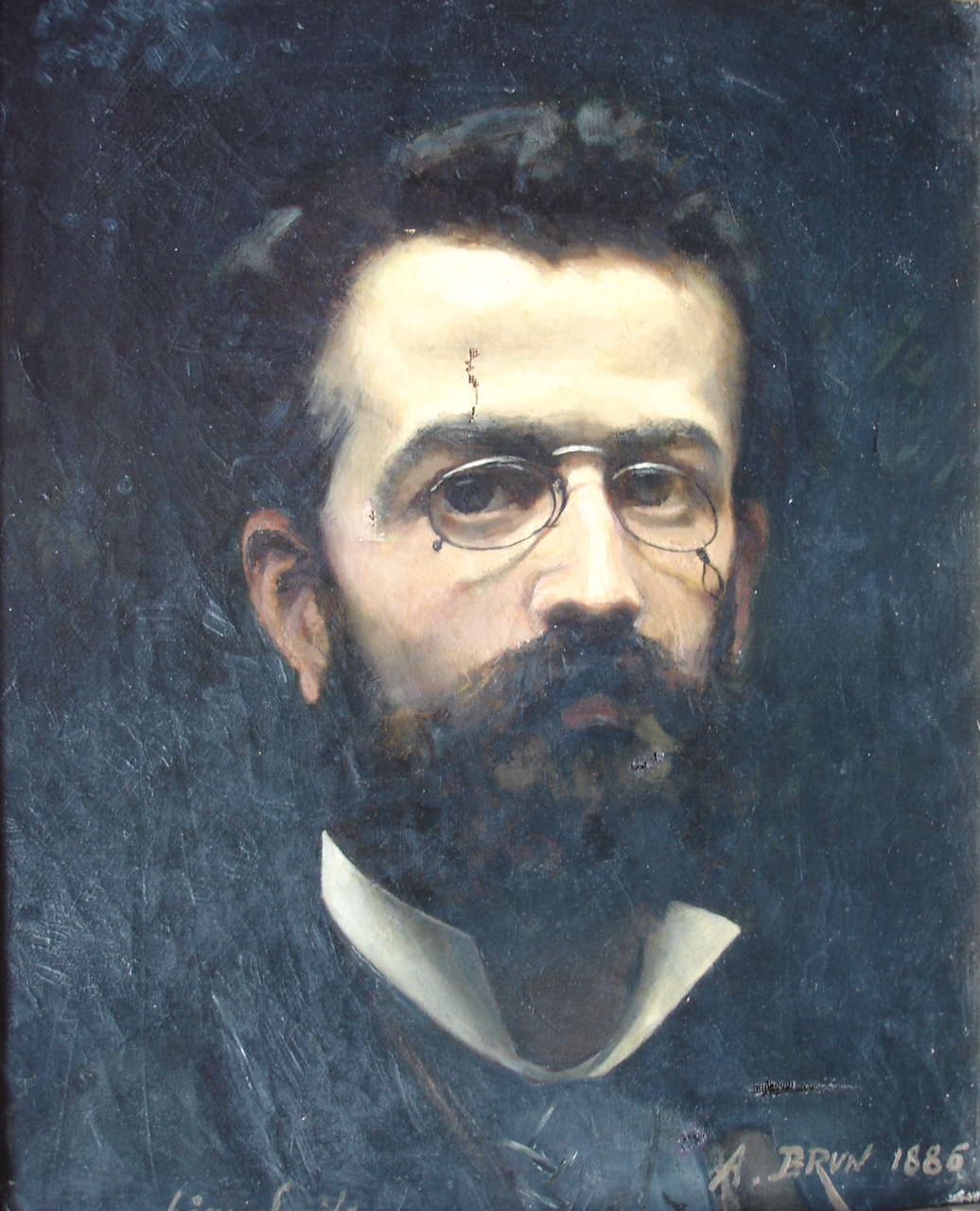
- Born: 3 November 1853; Marseille, France
- Died: 5 November 1941 (aged 88); Marseille, France

Alexandre Jean-Baptiste Brun (Marseille, 3 November 1853, Marseille; 5 November 1941) was a French painter, a pupil of Alexandre Cabanel, Carolus-Duran and Félix Bracquemond. He is especially known for his many marine paintings and a collection of watercolors on dark wash representing orchids.

== Biography ==
Alexandre Jean-Baptiste Brun was born in Marseille on 3 November 1853. He studied painting at the Ecole des Beaux-Arts in Paris, with masters such as Alexandre Cabanel, Carolus-Duran and Félix Bracquemond. He painted with Adolphe Monticelli, Louis Tinayre and Henri Pinta. After a first marriage that left him widowed, on 4 May 1886, in the 14th arrondissement of Paris, he married Lucile Dutheil, with whom he had three daughters and a son.

A marine painter, he made numerous illustrations for encyclopedias and books published by Sea of Larousse editions.

An accomplished yachtsman, he accompanied Prince Albert 1st of Monaco on some of his oceanographic expeditions. The prince invited him to collaborate in the creation of the frescoes of the Grand Amphitheater of the Oceanographic Institute of Paris, for which he financed the construction.

Alexandre Brun also executed commissions for Baroness Nathaniel de Rothschild, barons Arthur and Edmond de Rothschild, and relatives, such as Louis Libreck, for whom he produced his most famous work: a series of watercolors immortalizing his friend's collection of orchids. A prolific painter, he produced numerous family portraits, landscapes (banks of the Seine, Normandy coasts, Joliette Port, the calanques of Marseille) as well as still lifes.

A member of the Salon des artistes français from 1877, he submitted works almost every year until 1934.

He exhibited in London at the Royal Academy in 1881 and 1882, and at the Universal Exhibition in 1889, during which he was awarded the Bronze Medal, Marine Section, before deciding to devote himself to travelling various regions of France and Algeria. He suspended his activities again in 1914 to resume them at the end of the war until 1934, when he retired to Malmousque in his villa "L'Ouragan", exhibiting only at the Jouvene Gallery in Marseille.

He died in Marseilles on 5 November 1941.

== Work and themes ==
A painter, engraver and poster artist, his main works are paintings of the sea.

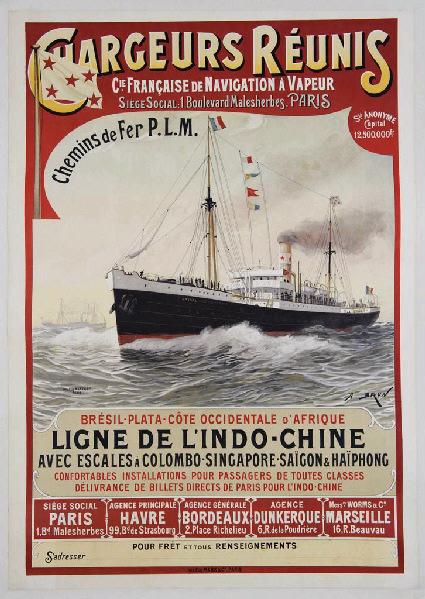
Poster, Chargers Reunited, Indochina Line, Museum of Aquitaine

"Very early, whether it is the Mediterranean or darker seas, a particular technique is affirmed: plots of color for stones and beach pebbles, or even for the leaves which litter a path, crashing sea foam and waves formed by brief brush strokes, overlapping or layered, and the intense brightness of the beaches."

He also produced numerous posters for the shipping companies, the Chargeurs Réunis, the Messageries Maritimes and the Société Générale des Transports Maritimes à Vapeur, focusing on the intense activity of the Quais aux huiles and Quais aux blés in Rive-Neuve in Marseille. He also participated in the production of sets for the Paris Opera.

=== Marine paintings ===
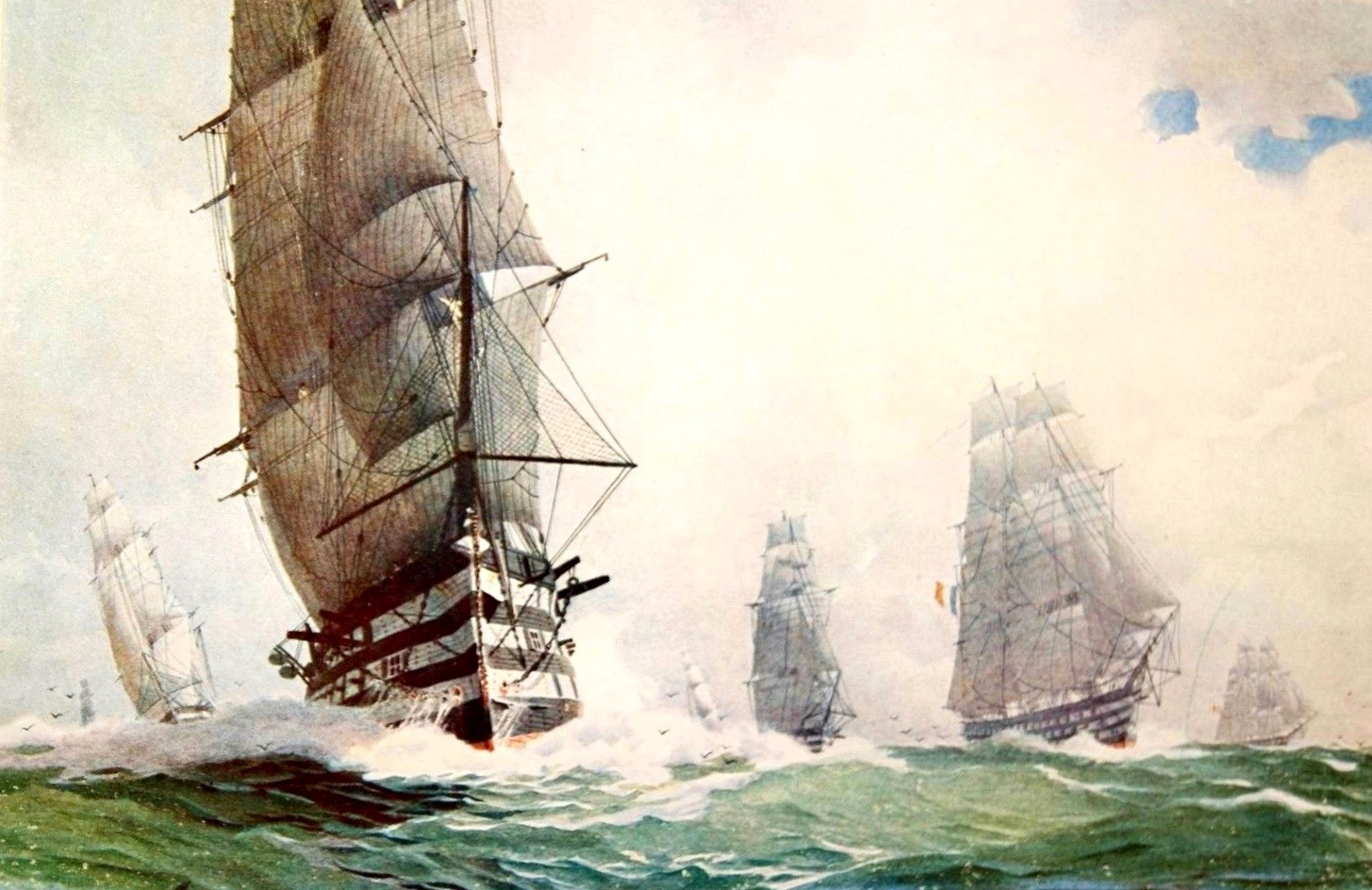
Three-deck Vessel Wing

Alexandre Brun painted many marines (oils on wood, on canvas, watercolors), representing life at sea, scenes of life (The departure of the sailor, 1885, After a sinking, 1888), fishing or bathing (Of sea, 1883), views of ports or ships (mainly three-masted and tartanes). He also produced illustrations of important events (The capture of Sfax, 1882, President Carnot embarking aboard the Formidable 1890), watercolors of historic ships (Le Soleil Royal, Royal Louis) and lithographs of warships: The Marengo, The Ocean, Le Suffren and L'Epervier). Many of his marine paintings were entrusted to the National Museum of the Navy in 2002, where, after a long and meticulous restoration campaign, they were studied, classified, inventoried, restored and photographed. Most of them are currently held in the Marine Museum's reserves at Chaillot, and will be transferred in 2016 to the new Conservation Center in Dugny.

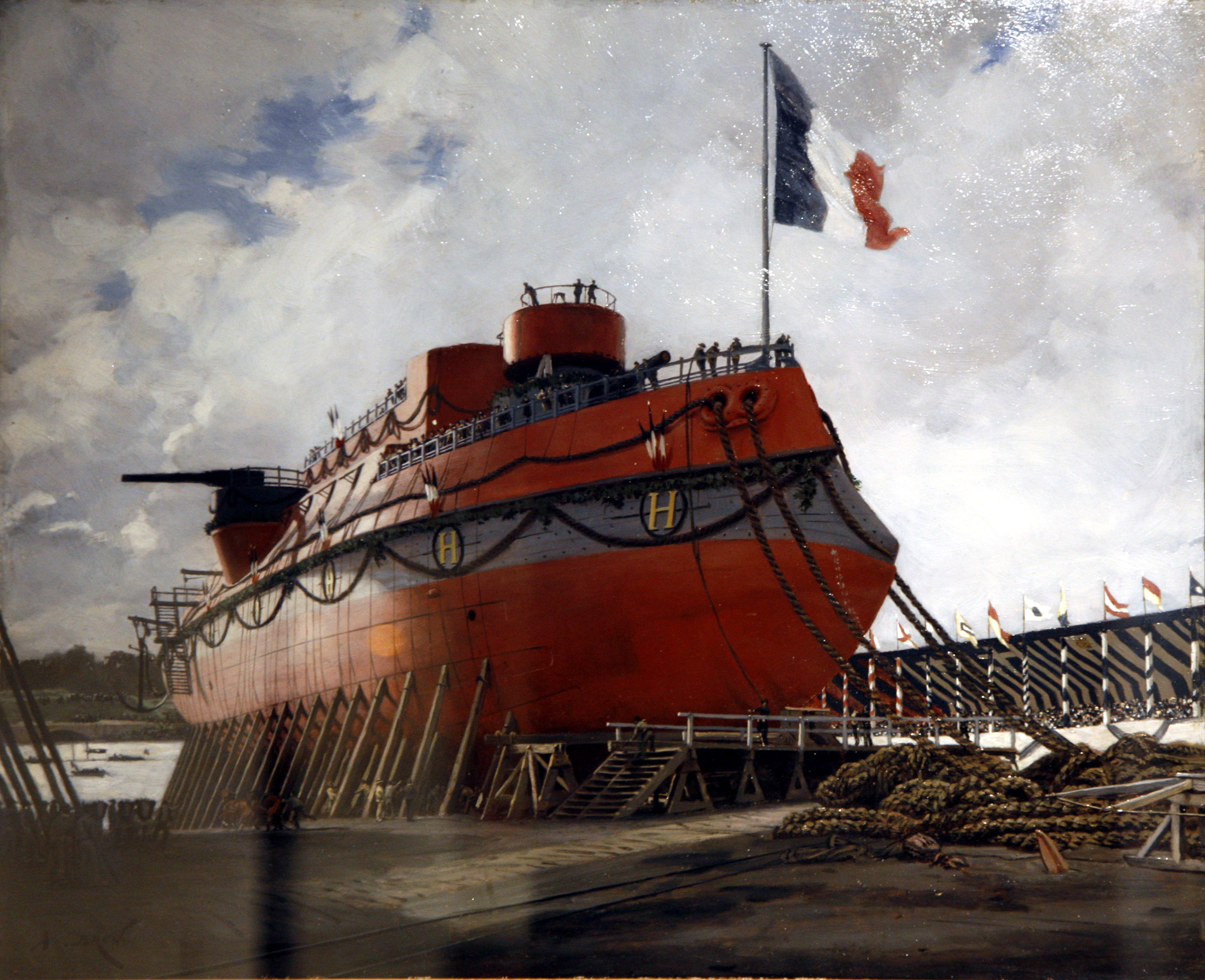
Launch of the Hoche

Some paintings were exhibited temporarily, notably in 2003 for Souvenirs de rivages and in 2009 for Ten Years of Acquisitions. Two paintings are published in the book Escales at the Musée de la Marine published in January 2016 by Gallimard.

These paintings, particularly representative of Alexandre Brun's work, will be the subject of a publication and a virtual exhibit on the museum's website.

Selected works are also held in the Chamber of Commerce and Industry of Marseille, especially two portraits of young people (1874 and 1878), a lithograph of the battleship Suffren, a wash representing the Old Port during the 2500th Anniversary of Marseille, and some posters.

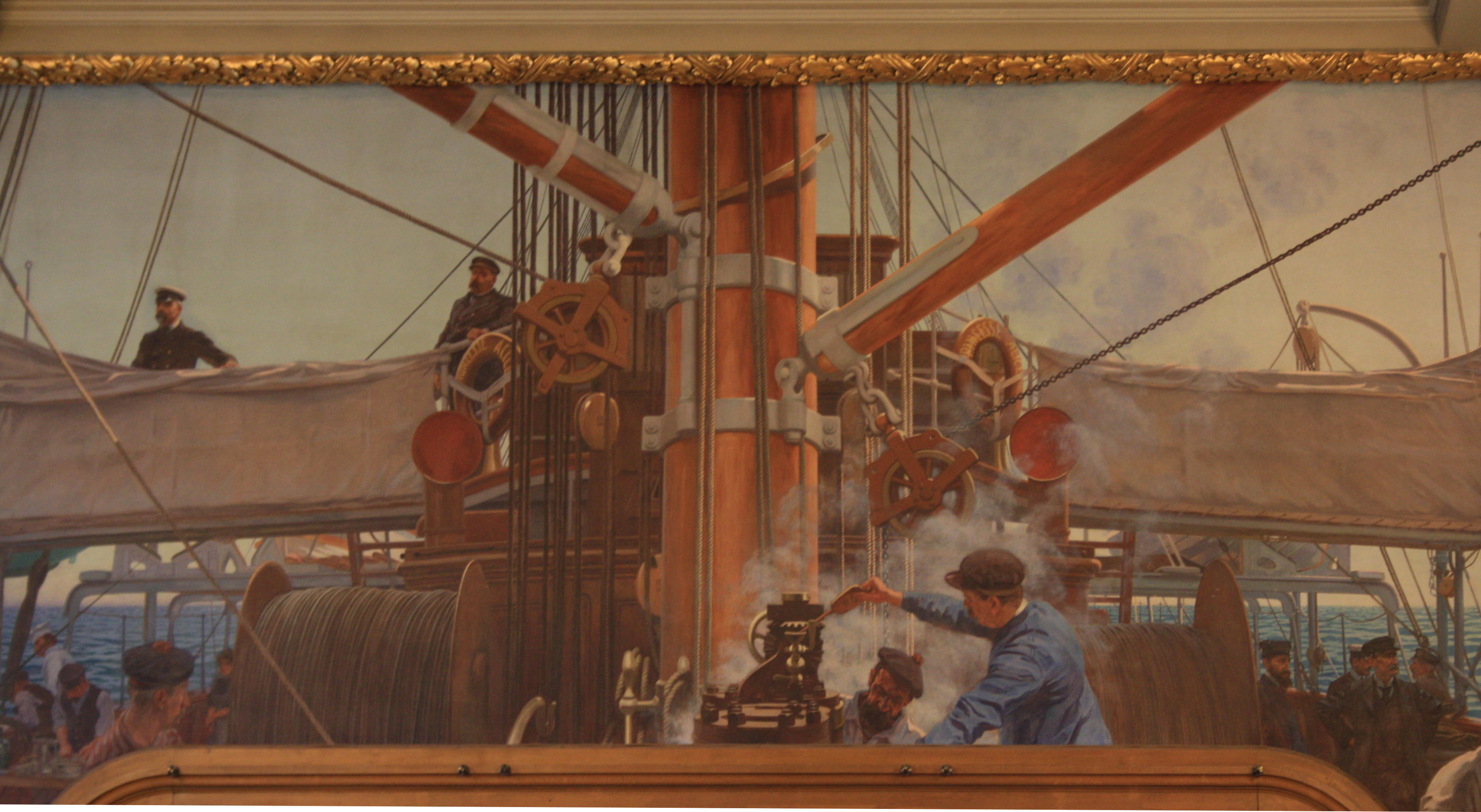
Institut océanographique de Paris, Fresco of the Grand Amphitheater

With the painter Louis Tinayre, he realized the four frescos of the Grand Amphitheater of the Institut océanographique de Paris. Louis Tinayre painted the characters while Alexander Brun, depicted the sea and the rigging.

The main fresco, entitled The Princess Alice Bridge during a cruise encircles the high bay that separates the large room from the small one. This vast composition shows the typical activities of an oceanographic cruise such as Prince Albert I of Monaco, the patron of the institute, had organized at the beginning of the 20th century.

=== The Orchids ===
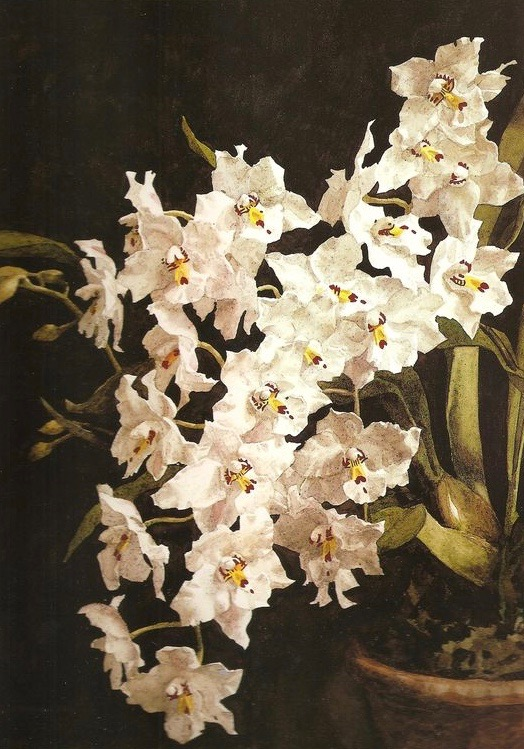
Orchidée Alexandre Brun

Alexandre Brun is also known for his famous collection of Orchids, commissioned by his friend, the passionate and wealthy Parisian collector Louis Libreck.

This fastidious work of documentation lasted two years, from 1892 to 1894. He immortalized some subjects of the collection, representing on dark wash details of a hundred of these rare flowers.

The collection of a hundred watercolors, forgotten for almost a century in the safe of an English bank, was exhibited for the first time around 1950, then a second time in 1981, when it received the Gold Medal of the Royal Horticultural Society of England.

This collection has been immortalized in the book The Forgotten Orchids - Alexandre Brun by Phil Cribb, deputy curator of the Herbarium of the Royal Botanic Gardens of Kew, a member of the Royal Horticultural Society of England and author of several books on orchids.

=== Scenes ===
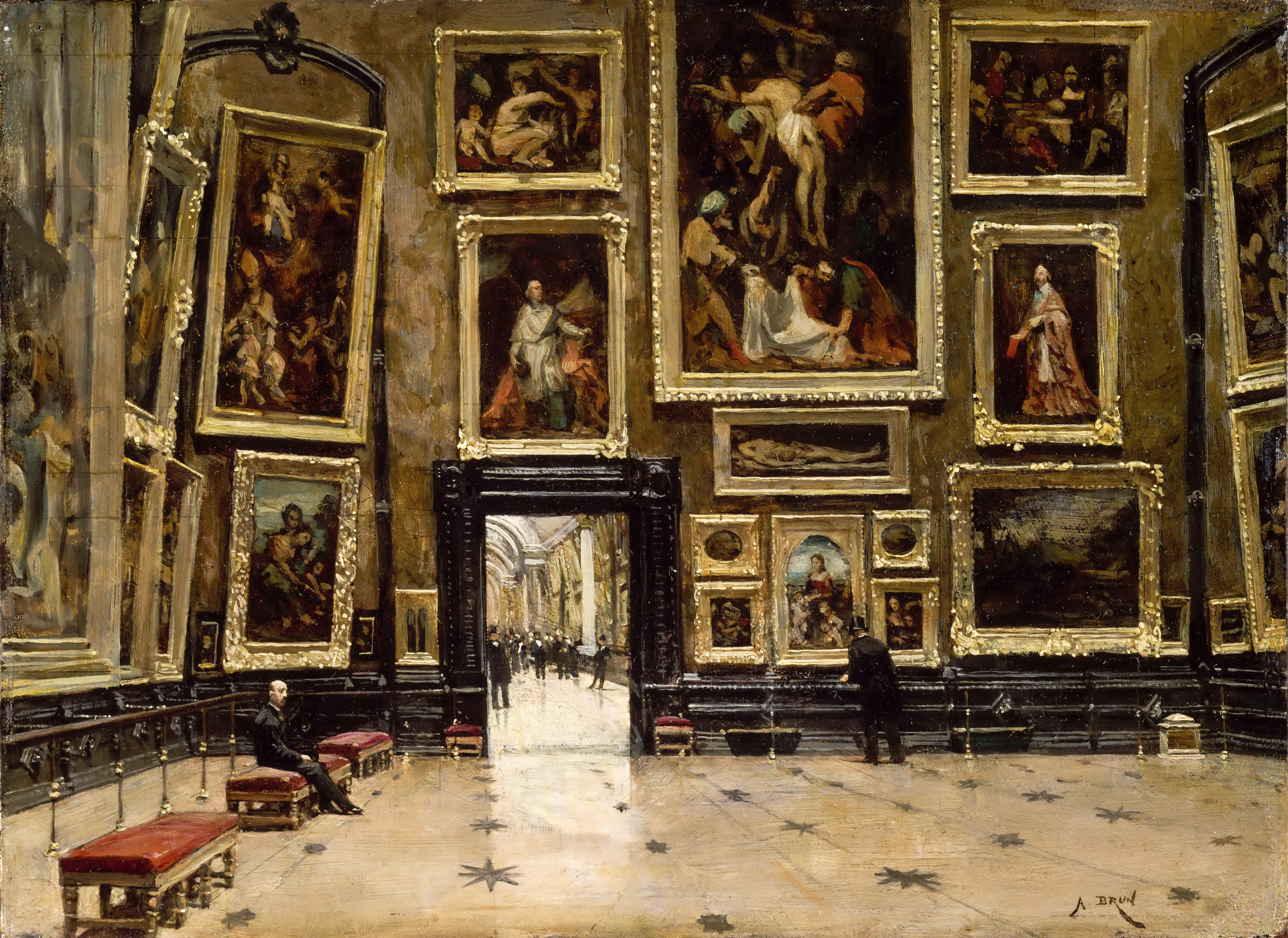
View of the Salon Carré

One of his most famous works is in the Musée du Louvre. This is the View of the Salon Carré.

The artist painted the west wall, including a door overlooking the Grande Galerie, and covered with paintings of all the schools. From 1848, the Salon Carré served as a platform for the masterpieces of the Louvre until the First World War.

This small oil painting on wood (32 cm long by 24 cm high) offers a detailed image of the Salon Carré as it was in the 19th century. One can recognize the famous paintings by Veronese, Rubens, Leonardo da Vinci, Raphael and Poussin, among others.

Alexandre Brun also painted still lifes, landscapes and portraits.

=== Illustrations ===
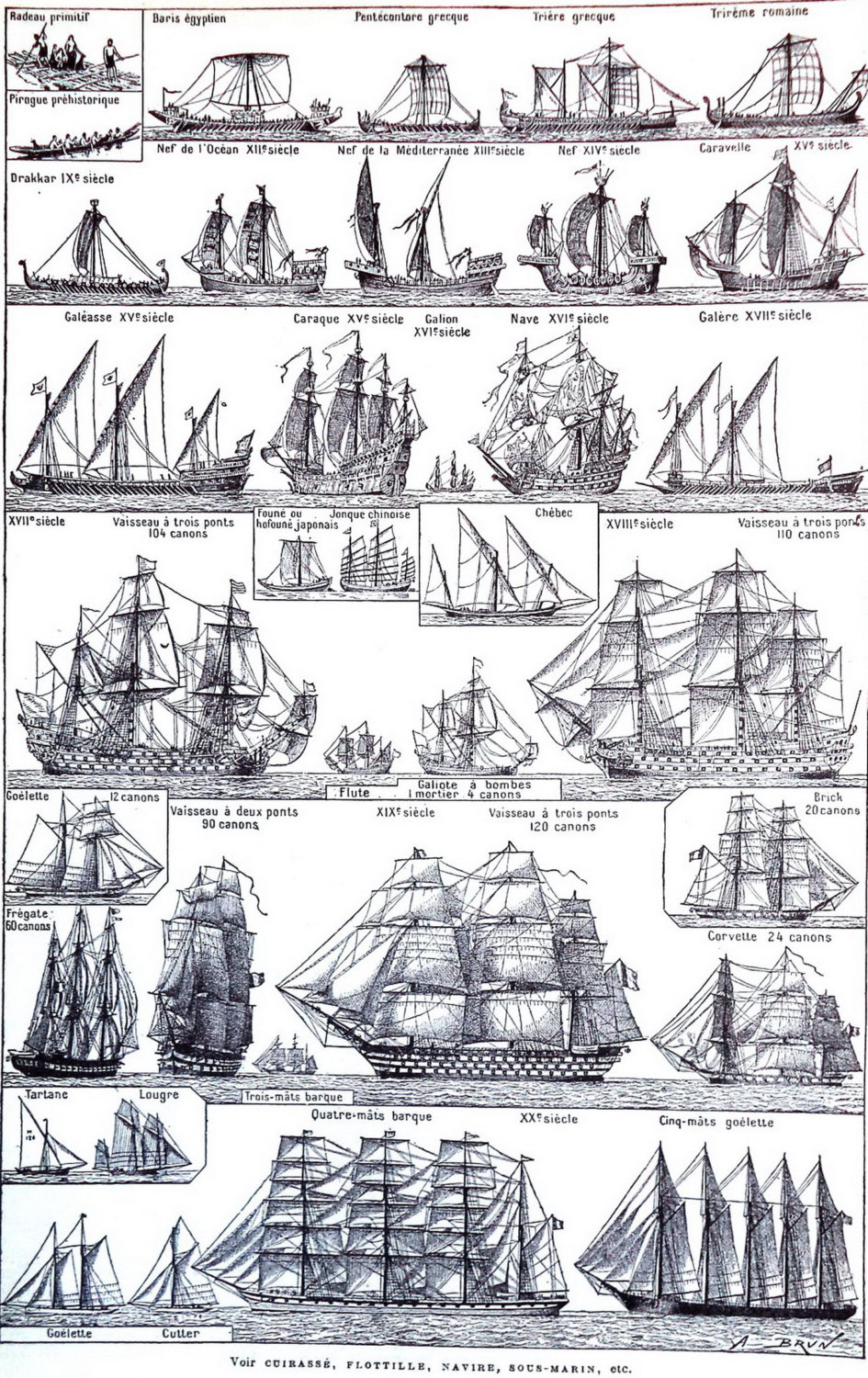
Alexandre Brun. Illustrated engraving, Petit Larousse 1933

An illustrator of books, dictionaries and encyclopedias, he collaborated with the major publications of the time: Illustration, Illustrated World, Yacht, etc. His experience led to his being selected to illustrate almost all of the marine section of the Illustrated Dictionary and thematic books such as The Sea, The Sea in Nature, and The Sea and Man published by Larousse. He produced numerous technical boards, ships' cuts, posters, and engravings on the theme of the sea and navigation.

== Annexes ==
=== Bibliography ===
- Inoubliables orchidées, Alexandre Brun (the Forgotten Orchids of Alexandre Brun) par Phillip Cribb, éditions Solar, 1992
- La revue du Louvre et des musées de France No. 2, 1989
- Une ville un port, un port des villes, Marseille Fos (Lire)
- Marseille, la revue culturelle de la ville de Marseille Ils ont peint Marseille No. 244, Pierre Murat, avril 2014, p. 99-107 (Lire)
- La Mer, La Mer dans la Nature, La Mer et l'Homme, G. Clerc – Rampal, Larousse, 1913-1930
