= Julien Tinayre =

French illustrator and wood-engraver

- Born: 26 October 1859; Issoire, Auvergne, France
- Died: 2 July 1923 (aged 63); Grosrouvre, Yvelines, France
- Occupation: Engraver
- Spouse: Marcelle Tinayre
- Children: 4
- Parent: Victoire Tinayre
- Relatives: Louis Tinayre (brother)

Julien Tinayre (26 October 1859 – 2 July 1923) was a French illustrator and wood-engraver.
