= Battle of Villepion =

Battle in Franco-Prussian War

- Part of the Franco-Prussian War
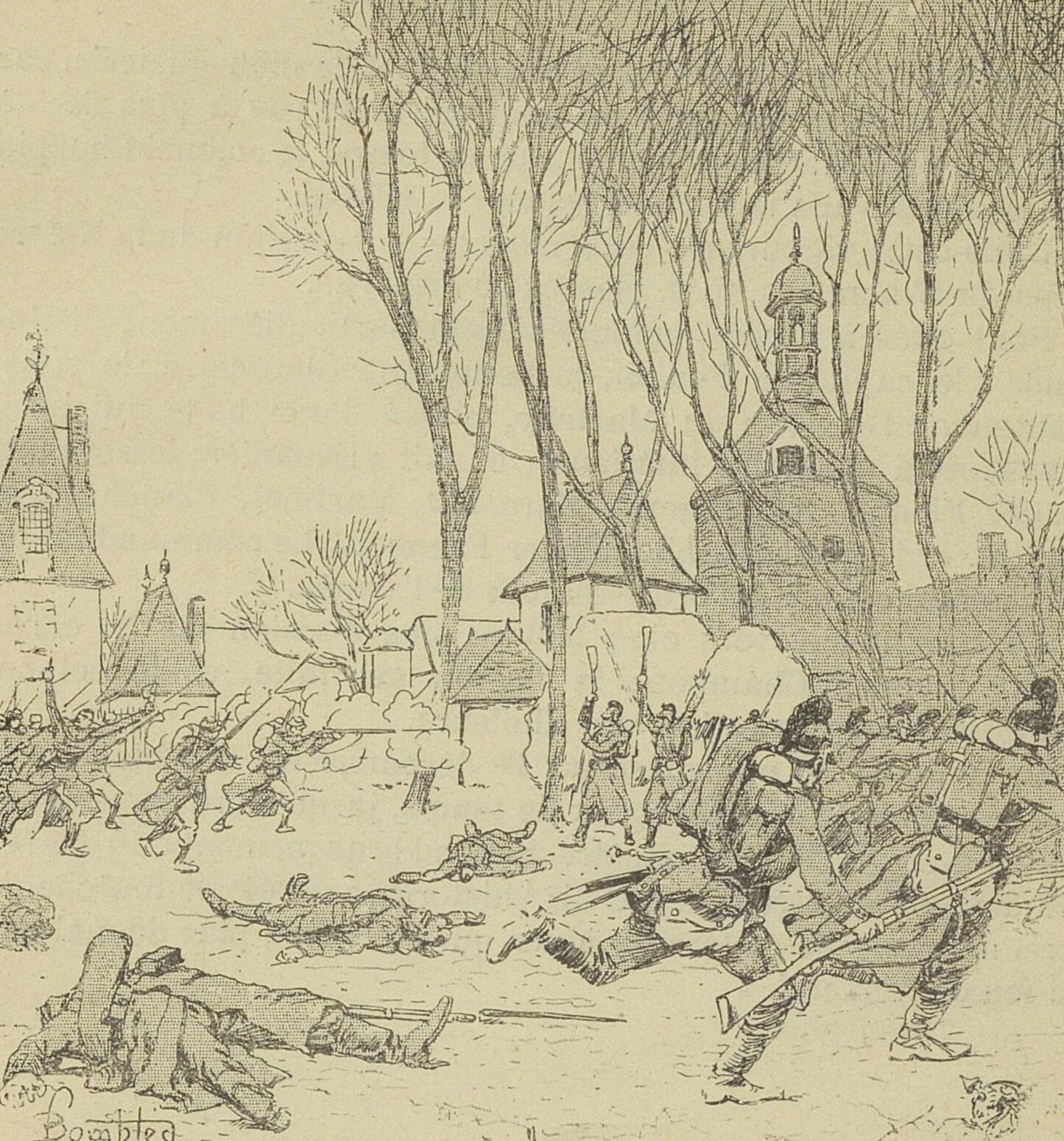
- French illustration of the capture of the castle of Villepion
Date	1 December 1870
Location	Terminiers, Eure-et-Loir, France
Result	French victory

Belligerents
Bavaria	French Republic

Commanders and leaders
Ludwig von der Tann-Rathsamhausen	Antoine Chanzy

Strength
8,000 men	14,000 men

Casualties and losses
800 killed or wounded 300 captured	500 killed or wounded

The Battle of Villepion took place between the French XVI Corps under General Chanzy and the I Bavarian Corps during the Franco-Prussian War. It occurred in the district of Terminiers, between Terminiers and Nonneville on 1 December 1870, and ended in a French victory.

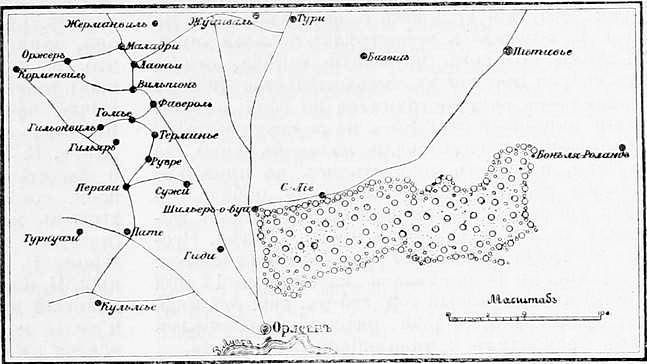
French Republic

After the Battle of Beaune-la-Rolande on 28 November 1870 the Corps in the centre of the French Army of the Loire advanced and made a swing east towards Pithiviers. On the early afternoon of 1 December an infantry division and a cavalry division of the French XVI Corps met I. Bayerischen Korps. The battle began in Terminiers and the western districts of the town. Although the whole I Corps intervened in the battle, the Bavarians held the position and the Corps had to retreat towards Villepion.

The fighting here lasted until nightfall. Under the cover of darkness the Bavarians retreated then returned and reunited with other units of the army group under Frederick Francis II, Grand Duke of Mecklenburg-Schwerin at Goury and Villeprivost (Loigny la Bataille). The retreat was covered by an artillery battery under the command of captain (later field marshal) Leopold of Bavaria, wounded in the action and receiving the Military Order of Max Joseph for his conduct in the battle, the highest Bavarian award for valour in the face of the enemy. The Bavarians lost about 1,100 men including 47 officers, while the French lost 500 men, including 18 officers. The German army group's counter-attack the next day led to the battle of Loigny-Poupry.
