= Brezolles =

- Commune
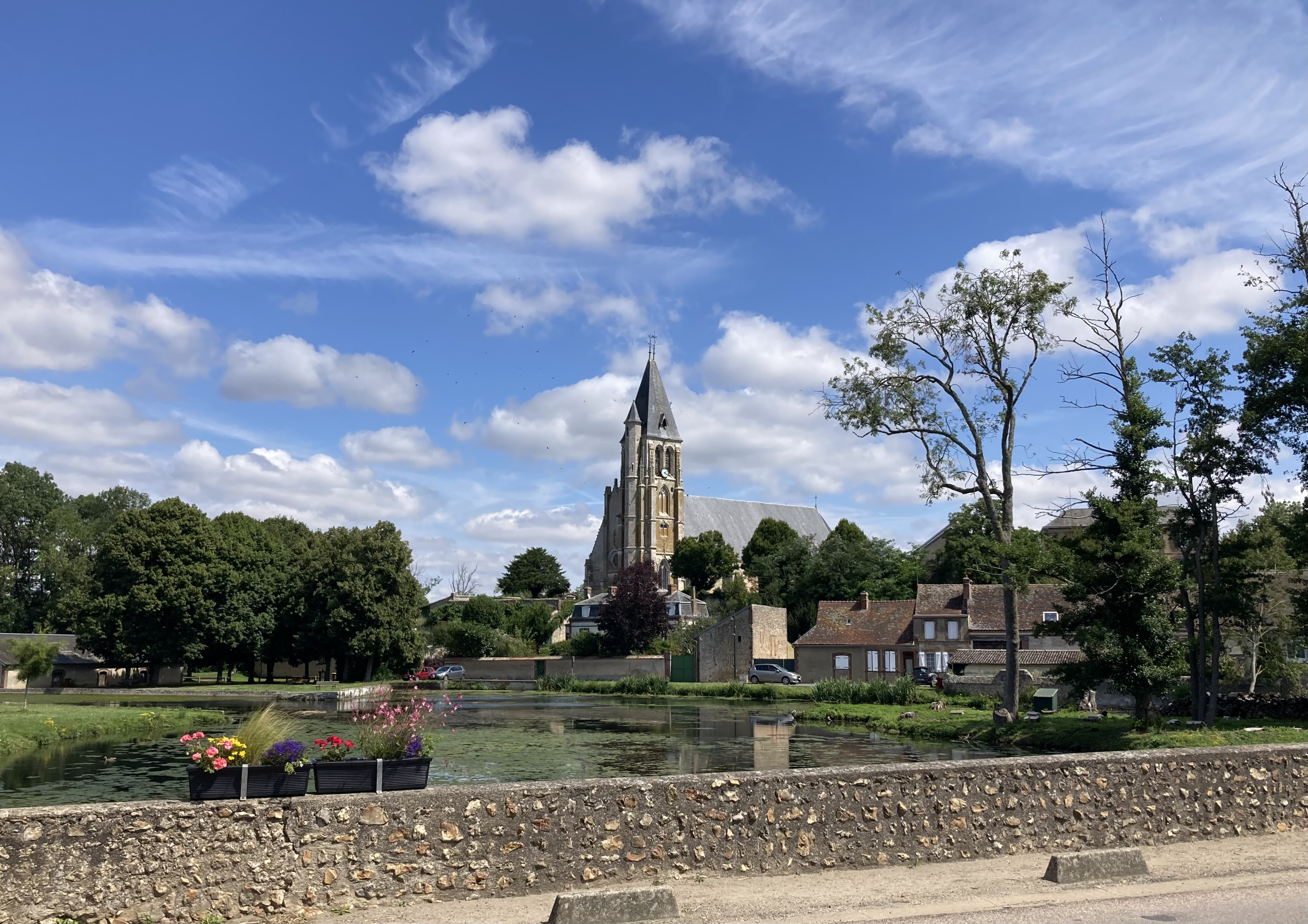
- View of Brezolles, with the church in the background and lake in the foreground.

- Coat of arms
- Location of Brezolles
- Location within France Location within Centre-Val de Loire
- Coordinates: 48°41′28″N 1°04′24″E
- Country: France
- Region: Centre-Val de Loire
- Department: Eure-et-Loir
- Arrondissement: Dreux
- Canton: Saint-Lubin-des-Joncherets
- Intercommunality: CA Pays de Dreux

Government
  - Mayor (2020–2026): Loïc Barbier
- Area^{1}: 14.23 km^{2} (5.49 sq mi)
- Elevation: 162 m (531 ft)
- Highest elevation: 185 m (607 ft)
- Lowest elevation: 144 m (472 ft)
- Population (2023): 1,785
  - Density: 125.4/km^{2} (324.9/sq mi)
- Time zone: UTC+01:00 (CET)
  - Summer (DST): UTC+02:00 (CEST)
- INSEE/Postal code: 28059 /28270
- ^{1} French Land Register data, which excludes lakes, ponds, glaciers > 1 km^{2} (0.386 sq mi or 247 acres) and river estuaries.

Brezolles (French pronunciation: [bʁəzɔl]) is a commune in the Eure-et-Loir department in northern France.

== Population ==
Historical population
Year	Pop.	±% p.a.
1968	1,138	—
1975	1,317	+2.11%
1982	1,429	+1.17%
1990	1,695	+2.16%
1999	1,708	+0.08%
2007	1,644	−0.48%
2012	1,901	+2.95%
2017	1,816	−0.91%
2023	1,785	−0.29%
Source: INSEE

== See also ==
- Natural region of Thymerais
- Communes of the Eure-et-Loir department
- Perche
