= Marguerite Tinayre =

French educator, writer and socialist (1831–1895)

- Born: Marguerite Victoire Guerrier; 6 March 1831; Issoire, Puy de Dôme, Auvergne-Rhône-Alpes, France
- Died: 16 August 1895 (aged 64); Neuilly-Sur-Seine, France
- Other names: Jean Guêtré; Jean Tinayre; Jules Paty
- Spouse: Jean Tinayre (m. 1858, d. 1871)
- Children: 6, including Louis Tinayre and Julien Tinayre

Marguerite Victoire Tinayre (née Guerrier, 6 March 1831 – 16 August 1895) was a French educator, writer, socialist and political activist. She was a member of the Paris Commune and operated under the pseudonyms Jean Guêtré, Jean Tinayre and Jules Paty.

== Biography ==
Tinayre was born on 6 March 1831 in Issoire, Puy de Dôme, Auvergne-Rhône-Alpes, France. Her family were artisans and members of the republican bourgeoisie. She ran a private school (école libre) in Issoire, in a room lent to her by her father, before moving to Paris.

=== Career ===
After the coup of Napoleon III in 1851, Tinayre was banned from teaching, her brother Ambroise was deported from France and her parents were ostracised from society for their political views. In 1858, she married notary clerk Jean Tinayre. They had 6 children together, including illustrator and painter Louis Tinayre and illustrator and wood-engraver Julien Tinayre (who married author Marcelle Tinayre). When she was allowed to teach again, she directed Protestant free schools in Neuilly, Bondy and Noisy-le-Sec.

Tinayre published two novels in the 1860s about peasant families moving to Paris, titled Un Rêve de femme and La Marguerite, the second of which was dedicated to the French novelist and memoirist George Sand. Both were published under the pseudonym Jules Paty. Tinayre also operated under the pseudonyms Jean Guêtré and Jean Tinayre. She opened a publishing house called Tinayre-Guerrier which published books on pedagogy.

In 1866, Tinayre moved to a poor neighbourhood of the 13th arrondissement and established a vocational school for girls. Also in 1866, she founded the small consumer cooperative Société des Équitables de Paris with Louise Michel, Paul Delamarche Étienne and Henry Fortuné. The cooperative joined L'Internationale and the Federal Chamber of Workers' Societies. In 1867, Tinayre organised a Saint-Simonian study group called The Just of Paris (French: Les Equitables de Paris). In 1868, she was monitored by the Police who observed her speaking at meetings defending "socialist and anti-religious ideas."

After the Paris Commune was declared in 1871, Tinayre was appointed as the general inspector of girls' schools in the 12th arrondissement on 11 April 1871. Under the Commune, she was a member of the Women's Union for the Defense of Paris and the Care of the Wounded. During "Bloody Week", Tinayre and her husband cared for the wounded, travelling from barricade to barricade.

=== Arrest and death ===
Tinayre was arrested after being denounced by a concierge on 26 May 1871 and was held at the Châtelet. After enquiring about her, Tinayre's husband was arrested and shot. Tinayre was released the day after her husband's summary execution and fled to Geneva, Switzerland, with her sister Anna Babrick. Their brother Antoine escaped to London, England.

On 9 January 1874, during the legal repression of the Commune, Tinayre was sentenced in absentia by the Conseil supérieur de la guerre to deportation to a fortified enclosure for her activity with insurrectionary groups. During her exile, she settled in Budapest, Hungary, and worked as a governess for a noble family. The Hungarian Comte de Bourgoing wrote a laudatory letter about her work in Hungary. She founded La Sociale and La Semaine de Mai newspapers.

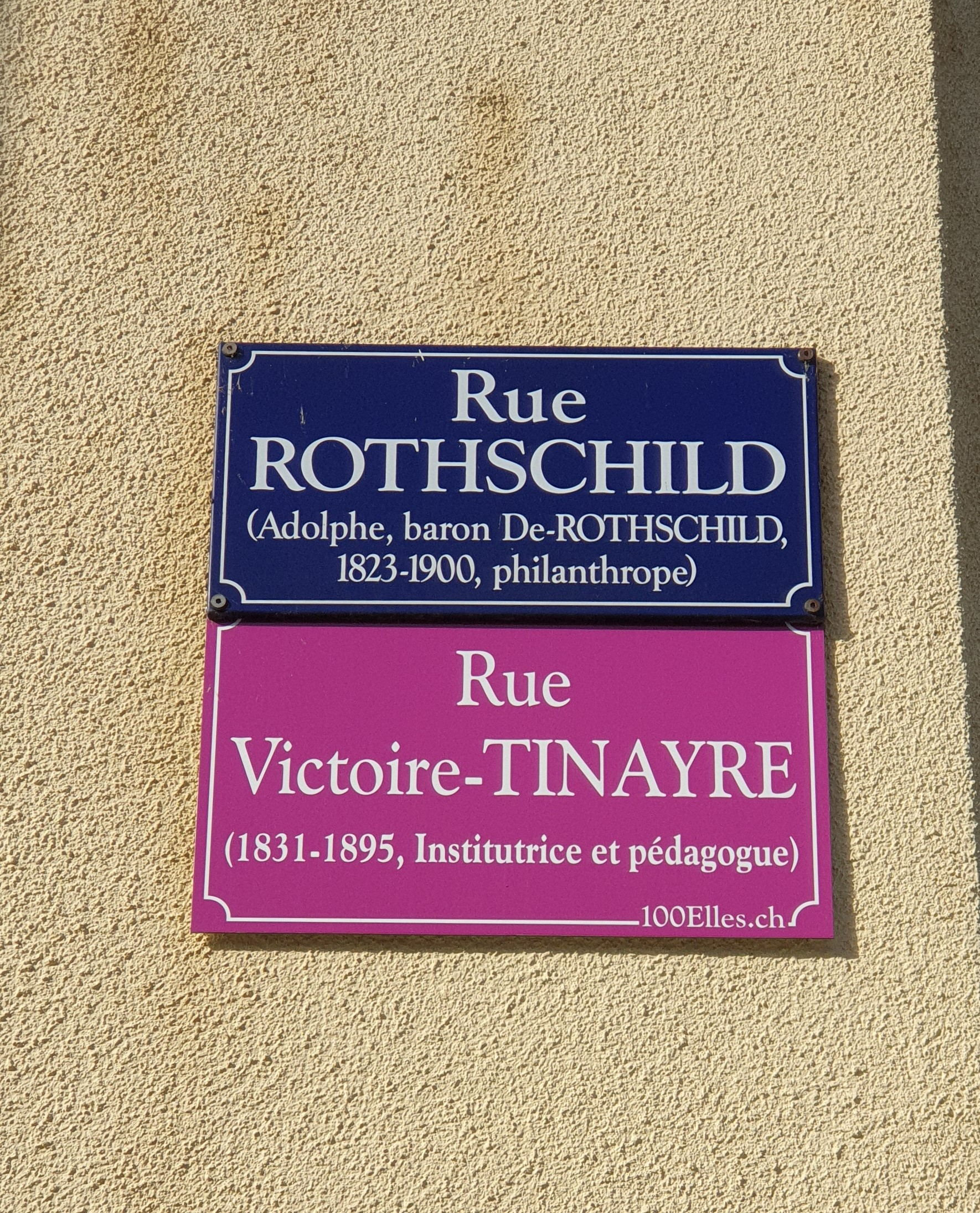
Rue Victoire Tinayre

On 27 November 1879, Tinayre received an amnesty on her sentence. She was fully pardoned in January 1880 and returned to France. She became a member of the Central Socialist Committee for Relief of Amnestied and Non-Amnestied Persons alongside Hubertine Auclert and Marie Manière.

Tinayre co-wrote the novel La Misère (1882) with Louise Michel, about a poor Parisian family in a modest neighbourhood who deal with a succession of tragedies, persecution and forms of class oppression. Their collaboration was difficult due to ideological differences. Tinayre later became a moral positivist, founded the Union des Femmes and taught in the schools of the Guise family from 1883 to 1885.

Tinayre died on 16 August 1895 in Neuilly-Sur-Seine, France, aged 64.

Archives of the Tinayre family are held at the Archives du Féminisme.
