= Loigny-la-Bataille =

- Commune
- Location of Loigny-la-Bataille
- Location within France Location within Centre-Val de Loire
- Coordinates: 48°07′26″N 1°44′02″E
- Country: France
- Region: Centre-Val de Loire
- Department: Eure-et-Loir
- Arrondissement: Châteaudun
- Canton: Les Villages Vovéens
- Intercommunality: Cœur de Beauce

Government
  - Mayor (2020–2026): Hugues Robert
- Area^{1}: 18.05 km^{2} (6.97 sq mi)
- Elevation: 127 m (417 ft)
- Highest elevation: 139 m (456 ft)
- Lowest elevation: 123 m (404 ft)
- Population (2023): 218
  - Density: 12.1/km^{2} (31.3/sq mi)
- Time zone: UTC+01:00 (CET)
  - Summer (DST): UTC+02:00 (CEST)
- INSEE/Postal code: 28212 /28140
- ^{1} French Land Register data, which excludes lakes, ponds, glaciers > 1 km^{2} (0.386 sq mi or 247 acres) and river estuaries.

Loigny-la-Bataille (French pronunciation: [lwaɲi la bataj]) is a commune in the Eure-et-Loir department in northern France.

== History ==
The commune was the site of a major battle Battle of Loigny-Poupry on Friday, December 2, 1870 during the Franco-Prussian War when a French force of about 300 soldiers under General Gaston De Sonis fought a Prussian force of almost 2000. The battle is commemorated by several monuments including a memorial chapel dedicated to the Sacred Heart.

== Population ==
Historical population
Year	Pop.	±% p.a.
1968	287	—
1975	238	−2.64%
1982	202	−2.32%
1990	178	−1.57%
1999	174	−0.25%
2007	225	+3.27%
2012	216	−0.81%
2017	206	−0.94%
2023	218	+0.95%
Source: INSEE

== See also ==
- Communes of the Eure-et-Loir department
