= Louis-Gaston de Sonis =

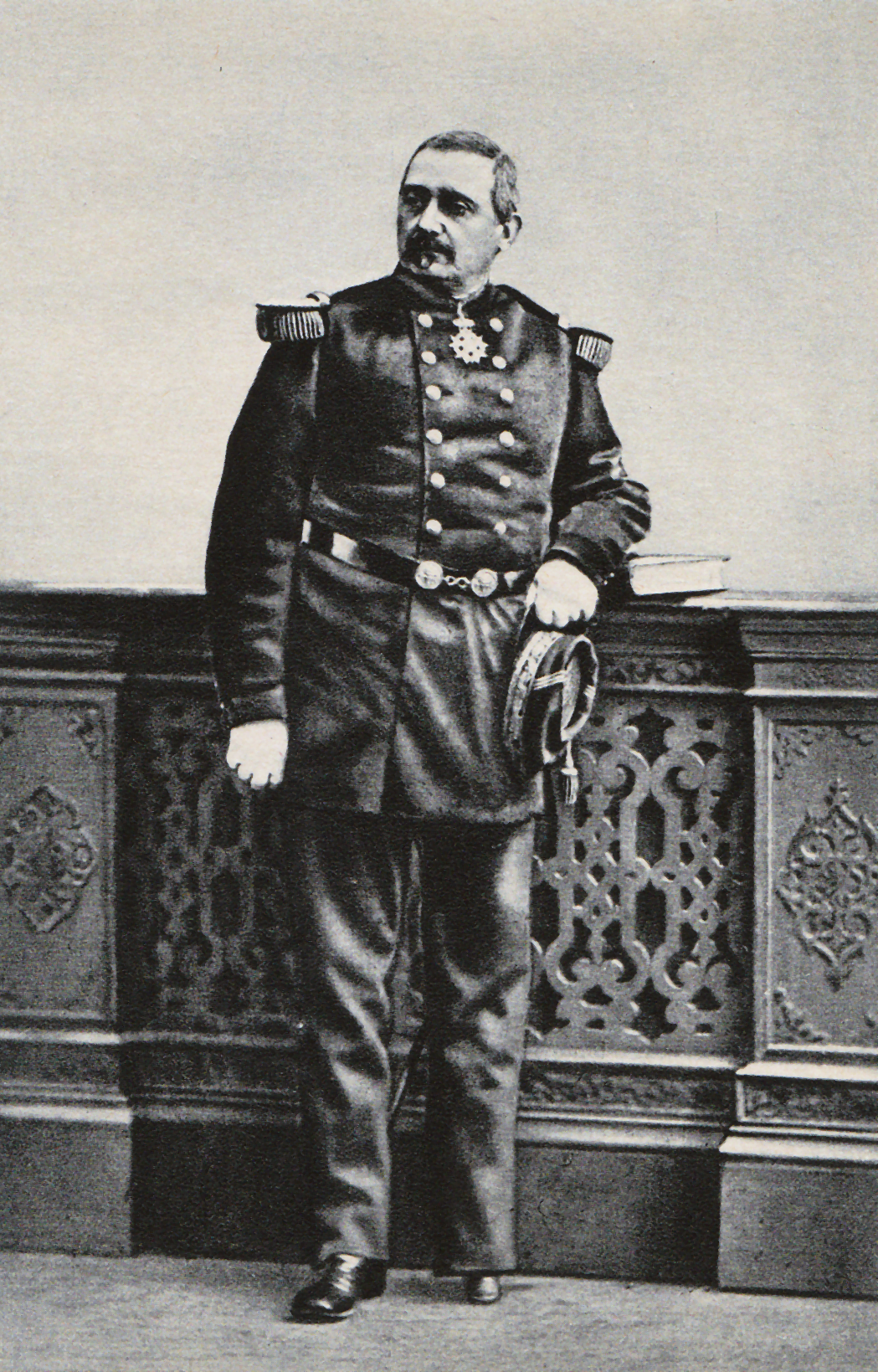
- Born: 25 August 1825; Pointe-à-Pitre, France
- Died: 15 August 1887 (aged 61); Paris, France
- Military career
- Allegiance: Bourbon Restoration; July Monarchy; French Second Republic; Second French Empire; French Third Republic
- Branch: French Army
- Service years: 1825–1883
- Rank: Général de Division
- Conflicts: Franco-Prussian War: Battle of Loigny
- Awards: Legion of Honour (Grand Officier)

Louis-Gaston de Sonis (25 August 1825 – 15 August 1887) was a French Army officer who particularly distinguished himself in the Battle of Loigny during the Franco-Prussian War, where he lost a leg.

== Life ==
Louis Gaston was born on 25 August 1825 in Pointe-à-Pitre (Guadeloupe), and came to France in 1832, where he studied for the military, following in his father's footsteps. At age 10, he lost his mother, and at age 19, his father. This double wound marked the beginning of his conversion. In 1848, as a young officer—the only practicing Catholic in his class—he discerned a call to become a monk of Solemes, but realized that it was in the world that he was called to serve God. At age 23, he married Anaïs, a girl of 17 years, with whom he began a family that would grow to include 12 children. He was a loving husband and father, showed great love for the Eucharist, and shone especially in the virtue of obedience. To grow closer to God, he joined the Third (Secular) Order of Discalced Carmelites.

Appointed general of the army corps at the age of 45, he led the heroic charge of Loigny under the protection of the banner of the Sacred Heart, embroidered by Visitation nuns of Paray le Monial. Seriously injured in this battle, the Blessed Virgin Mary appeared to the General, assuring him that all was not lost; France would survive. However, the General's left leg had to be amputated. He died on 15 August 1887 in Paris, after 17 years of suffering.

Some of his thoughts:

"When one begins to love God, one cannot love enough."

"Mary is placed on the threshold of eternity to inspire confidence in those who must bear the cross."

"Fight bravely against the demon of sadness. Oppose it by a fresh submission to the will of God, and serve God in joy, with great simplicity of heart."

He showed that the martial spirits that are so often admired in soldiers of the warrior class do not mutually exclude a strong faith life. Indeed, General de Sonis showed that in all actuality, a proper understanding of manly courage and virility can only be properly understood when grounded in a proper understanding of God, and of one's subordination and responsibility to the Divine Creator. De Sonis shared many similar attributes with a current day exemplar of another great Catholic warrior—Colonel John Ripley.

His cause for canonization in the Roman Catholic Church has been proposed.

== Bibliography ==
- Lady Herbert, The Life of General De Sonis, from his papers and correspondence, London : Art and Book Co.; New York : Benziger, 1891.
- Jacques de la Faye, Histoire du Général de Sonis, Bloud et Barral, Paris, 1890.
- Mgr Baunard, Le Général de Sonis d'après ses papiers et sa correspondance, Poussielgue, Paris, 1890.
- Jean des Marets, Le Général de Sonis, préface d'Émile Baumann, Fernand Sorlot, Paris, 1934.
- Albert Bessières S.J, Sonis, Beauchesne et ses fils, Paris, 1946.
- Maurice Briollet, Le Général Gaston de Sonis et sa descendance, R. Madiot, Laval, 1969.
- Francine Dessaigne, Sonis, mystique et soldat, Nouvelles éditions latines, Paris, 1988, ISBN 2-7233-0373-X
- Gérard Bedel, Sous la bannière du Sacré Cœur le Général de Sonis, D.E.L, 1997, ISBN 2-911009-04-5.
