= Henri Pinta =

French painter

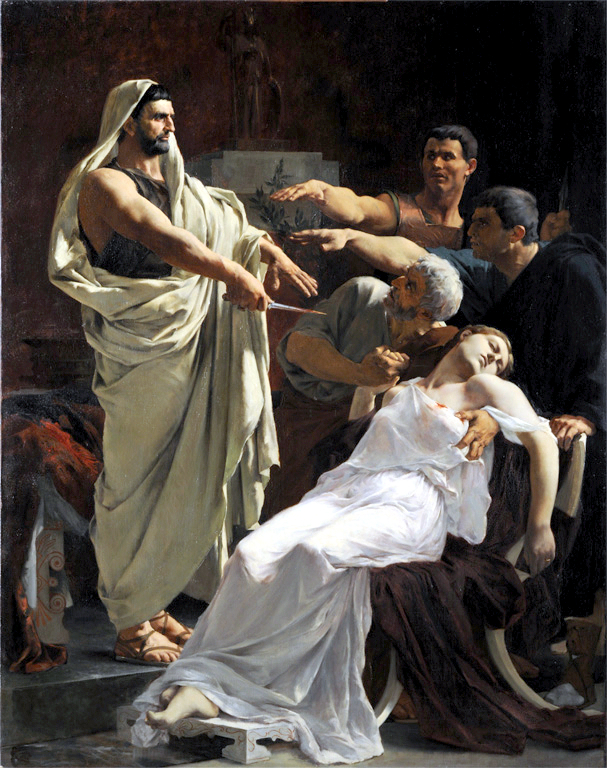
- The oath of Brutus after the death of Lucretia, 1884
- Born: 15 June 1856; Marseille
- Died: 18 October 1944 (aged 88); Paris
- Alma mater: French Academy in Rome
- Awards: Prix de Rome; Chevalier of the Legion of Honour

Henri Ludovic Marius Pinta (15 June 1856, in Marseille – 18 October 1944, in Paris) was a French painter who specialized in religious works. He also created designs for mosaics and stained glass windows.

== Biography ==
He studied with Alexandre Cabanel and Jules Lefebvre. In 1884, he was awarded the Prix de Rome for his depiction of the "oath of Brutus" after the death of Lucretia. From 1885 to 1888, he was a resident at the Villa Médicis in Rome, under the directorship of Ernest Hébert. In 1885, an exhibition was held in Paris, to give the residents an opportunity to show off their work. His choice of subject matter was strange, and some said heretical: "Christ Weeping Over the Futility of His Sacrifice", in which Jesus was portrayed without divine qualities.

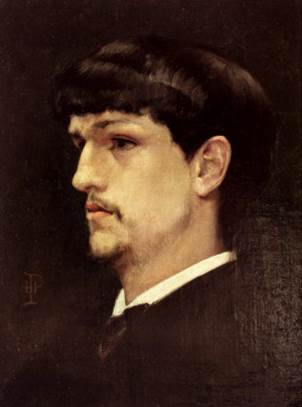
Portrait of Claude Debussy (1886)

The following year, he presented a "Saint Martha", which was criticized on the grounds that she was too coquettish. In 1887, his "Mass at Bolsena" (after Raphael) was deemed to have been derived from the least interesting part of the original. Finally, in 1888, his rendering of Aurora was rated as mediocre and vulgar. What is, perhaps, his best known work also comes from this period: a portrait of the composer Claude Debussy, who was a resident of the Villa in 1886.

In 1890, he became a member of the Société des Artistes Français and exhibited regularly at the Salon. Notable works from this later period include "Naissance du Jour" (Birth of Day, 1903), which is still widely reproduced, and an unconventional "Sacred Heart", inspired by his sadness over the loss of two sons in the First World War. It was a favorite of Teilhard de Chardin.

He was a life long friend with another painter from Marseille, Alexandre Jean-Baptiste Brun.

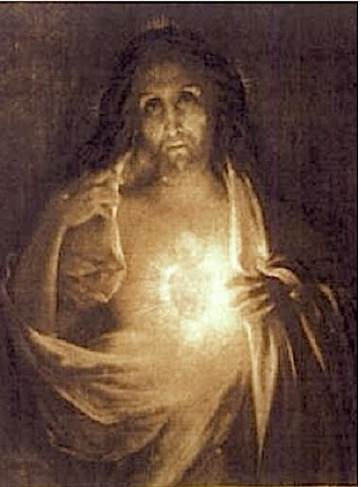
The Sacred Heart (1921)

Later, his works became more conventional in style and he concentrated on designs for church decorations. In 1915, he created a mural depicting the death of Saint Joseph for the church of Saint-François Xavier des Missions étrangères. Together with the stained glass maker, Louis-Charles-Marie Champigneulle, he produced designs for windows at the church of Saint Vaast in Béthune and the Basilica of the Sacred Heart in Marseille.

In 1933, he returned with Champigneulle to the Basilica, designing mosaics for the choir that cover 120 square meters (app. 1291 square feet). The project took until 1941 to complete.
