= Marcelle Tinayre =

French author

Marcelle Marguerite Suzanne Tinayre
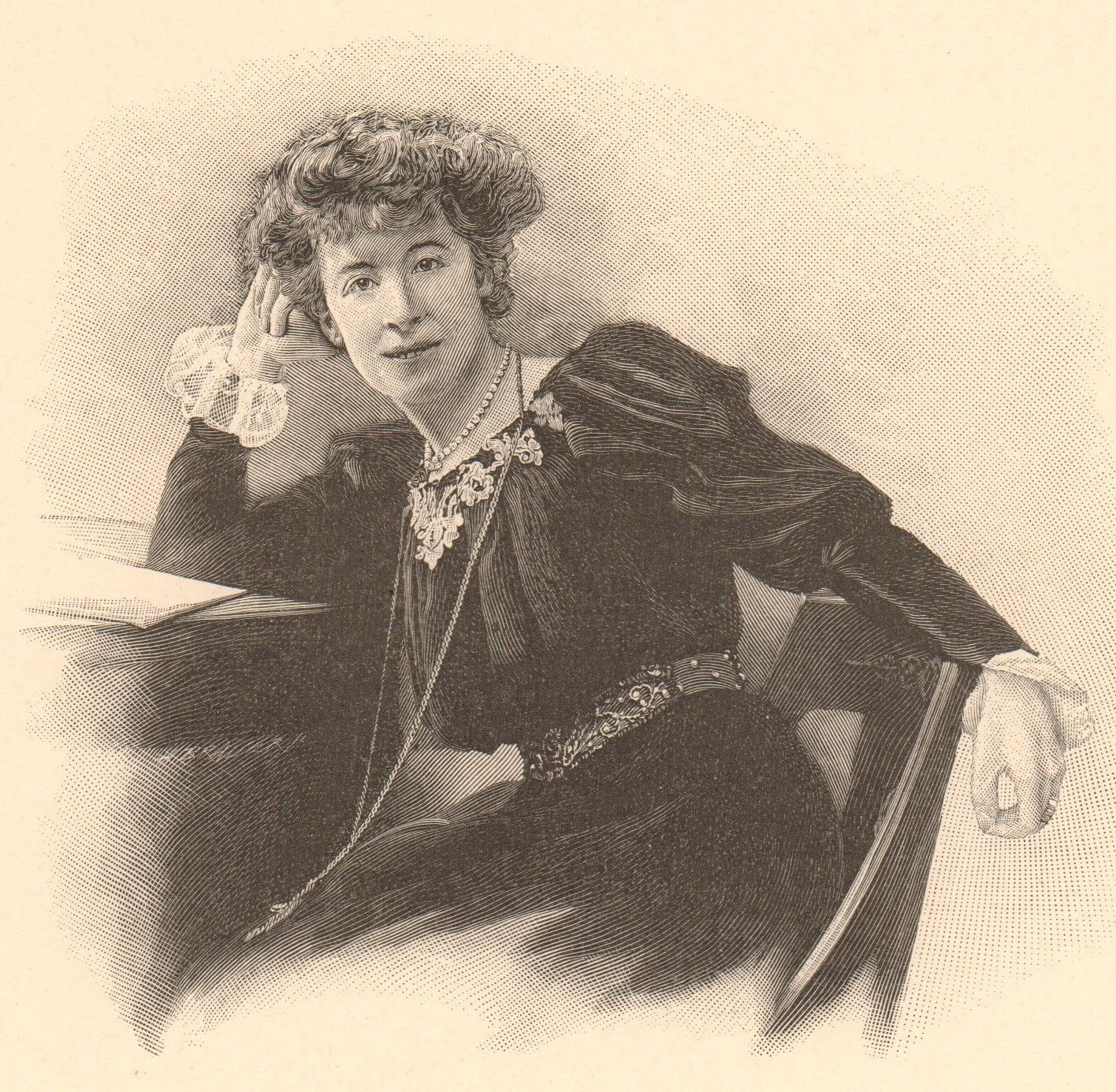
- Born: 8 October 1870; Tulle, Corrèze, France
- Died: 23 August 1948 (aged 77); Grossouvre, Cher, France
- Occupation: Writer

Marcelle Marguerite Suzanne Tinayre (8 October 1870 in Tulle, Corrèze – 23 August 1948 in Grossouvre, Cher) was a French woman of letters and prolific author. She was educated at Bordeaux and Paris, and in 1889 married the painter Julien Tinayre, son of Marguerite Tinayre.

== Bibliography ==
- Avant l'amour, Paris, Calmann-Lévy, 1909
- Chateau en Limousin, Paris, L'Illustration, 1934
- Châteaux disparus, Paris, Formin-Didot, 1940
- Est-ce un miracle?, Paris, Flammarion 1939
- Figures dans la nuit, Paris, Calmann-Lévy, 1926
- Fille des pierres, Paris, Hamy, 1990
- Gérard et Delphine [I]: La porte rouge, Paris, Flammarion, 1936
- Gérard et Delphine [II]: Le rendez-vous du soir, Paris, Flammarion, 1938
- Hellé, Paris, Calmann-Lévy, 1898
- Histoire de l'amour, Paris, Flammarion, 1935
- La consolatrice, Paris, L'Illustration, 1907–1908
- La douceur de vivre, Paris, [s.n.], 1910
- La femme et son secret, Paris, Flammarion, 1933
- La légende de Duccio et d'Orsette, Paris, l'Illustration, 1923
- La maison, du péché, Paris, Calmann-Lévy, 1900
- La rançon, Paris, Nelson, 1894
- La rebelle, Paris, Calmann-Lévy, 1921
- La veillée des armes. Le départ: août 1914, Paris, Calmann-Lévy, 1915
- La vie amoureuse de Francois Barbazanges, Paris, Calmann-Lévy, 1903
- La vie amoureuse de Madame de Pompadour, Paris, Flammarion, 1924
- L'amour qui pleure, Paris, Calmann-Lévy, 1908
- Le bouclier d'Alexandre, Paris, L’Illustration, 1922
- Le livre proscrit; scènes de la révolution communiste en Hongrie, Paris, Plon 1925
- L'ennemie intime, Paris, L’Illustration, 1931
- L'oiseau d'orage, Paris, Calmann Lévy, 1894
- L'ombre de l'amour, Paris, Calmann-Lévy, 1909
- Madame de Pompadour, Paris, Flammarion, 1924
- Mademoiselle Justine de Liron, Paris, Bossard, 1921
- Notes d'une voyageuse en Turquie : jours de bataille et de révolution; choses et gens de province; premiers jours d'un nouveau règne; la vie au harem, Paris, Calmann-Lévy, 1909
- Perséphone, Paris, Calmann-Lévy, 1920
- Priscille Séverac, Paris, Calmann-Lévy, 1922
- Saint Jean libérateur, Paris, l'Illustration, 1926
- Sainte Marie du feu, Paris, L'Illustration, 1938
- Terres étrangères : Norvège, Suède, Hollande, Andalousie, Paris, Flammarion, 1928
- Un drame de famille, Paris, Calmann-Lévy, 1925
- Une provinciale en 1830, Paris, Lafitte, 1927
