= Terminiers =

- Commune
- Coat of arms
- Location of Terminiers
- Location within France Location within Centre-Val de Loire
- Coordinates: 48°05′00″N 1°44′27″E
- Country: France
- Region: Centre-Val de Loire
- Department: Eure-et-Loir
- Arrondissement: Châteaudun
- Canton: Les Villages Vovéens

Government
  - Mayor (2020–2026): Benoît Pellegrin
- Area^{1}: 31.72 km^{2} (12.25 sq mi)
- Elevation: 132 m (433 ft)
- Highest elevation: 136 m (446 ft)
- Lowest elevation: 121 m (397 ft)
- Population (2023): 881
  - Density: 27.8/km^{2} (71.9/sq mi)
- Time zone: UTC+01:00 (CET)
  - Summer (DST): UTC+02:00 (CEST)
- INSEE/Postal code: 28382 /28140
- ^{1} French Land Register data, which excludes lakes, ponds, glaciers > 1 km^{2} (0.386 sq mi or 247 acres) and river estuaries.

Terminiers (French pronunciation: [tɛʁminje]) is a commune in the Eure-et-Loir department in northern France.

== Population ==
Historical population
Year	Pop.	±% p.a.
1968	865	—
1975	831	−0.57%
1982	762	−1.23%
1990	835	+1.15%
1999	917	+1.05%
2007	960	+0.57%
2012	957	−0.06%
2017	903	−1.15%
2023	881	−0.41%
Source: INSEE

== See also ==
- Communes of the Eure-et-Loir department
