= Poupry =

- Commune
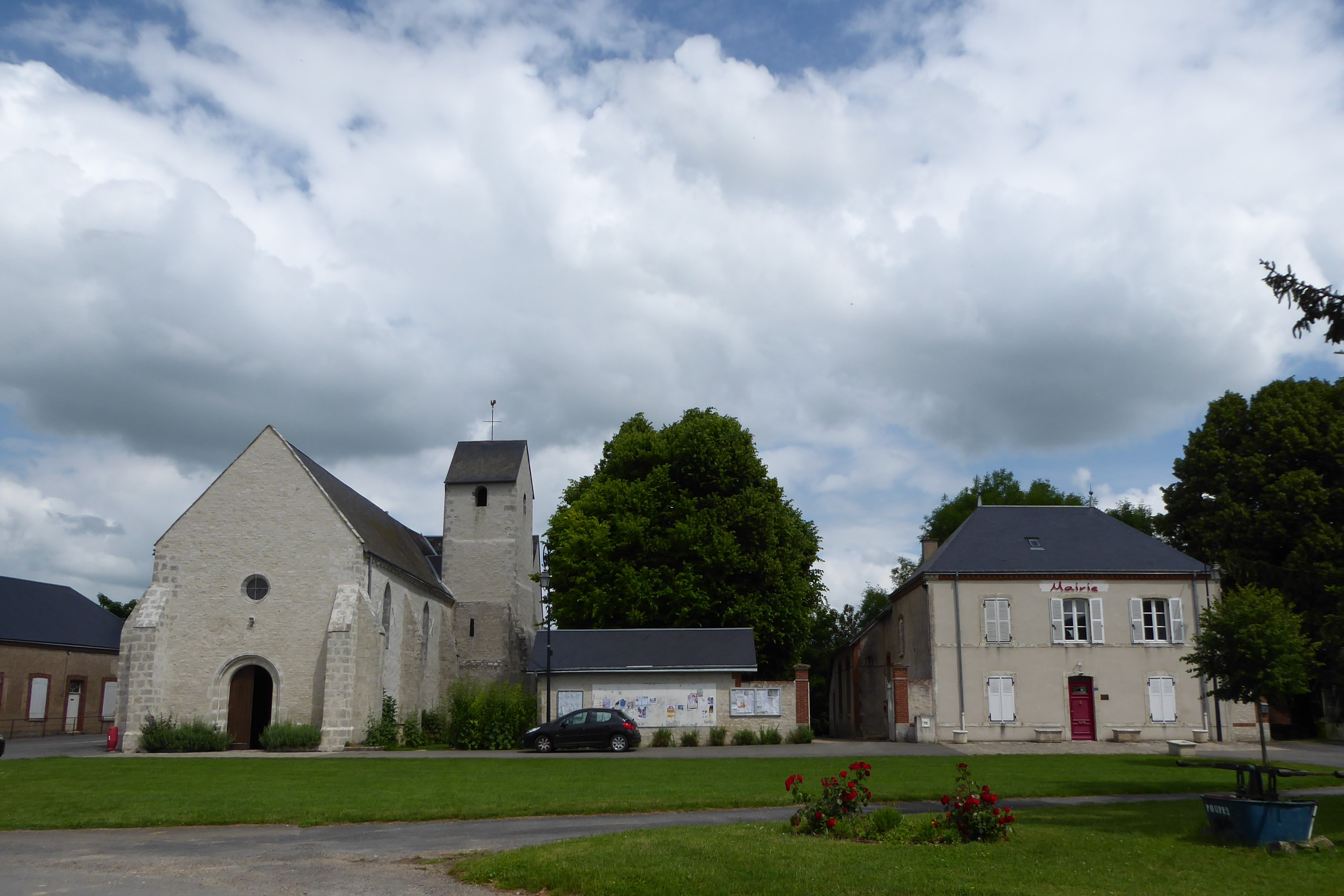
- The church and town hall in Poupry
- Location of Poupry
- Location within France Location within Centre-Val de Loire
- Coordinates: 48°06′01″N 1°50′22″E
- Country: France
- Region: Centre-Val de Loire
- Department: Eure-et-Loir
- Arrondissement: Châteaudun
- Canton: Les Villages Vovéens
- Intercommunality: Cœur de Beauce

Government
  - Mayor (2020–2026): Dany Bertheau
- Area^{1}: 14.48 km^{2} (5.59 sq mi)
- Elevation: 127 m (417 ft)
- Highest elevation: 129 m (423 ft)
- Lowest elevation: 118 m (387 ft)
- Population (2023): 96
  - Density: 6.6/km^{2} (17/sq mi)
- Time zone: UTC+01:00 (CET)
  - Summer (DST): UTC+02:00 (CEST)
- INSEE/Postal code: 28303 /28140
- ^{1} French Land Register data, which excludes lakes, ponds, glaciers > 1 km^{2} (0.386 sq mi or 247 acres) and river estuaries.

Poupry (French pronunciation: [pupʁi]) is a commune in the Eure-et-Loir department in northern France.

== Population ==
Historical population
Year	Pop.	±% p.a.
1968	162	—
1975	123	−3.86%
1982	115	−0.96%
1990	103	−1.37%
1999	110	+0.73%
2007	103	−0.82%
2012	99	−0.79%
2017	112	+2.50%
2023	96	−2.54%
Source: INSEE

== See also ==
- Communes of the Eure-et-Loir department
