= Grosrouvre =

- Commune
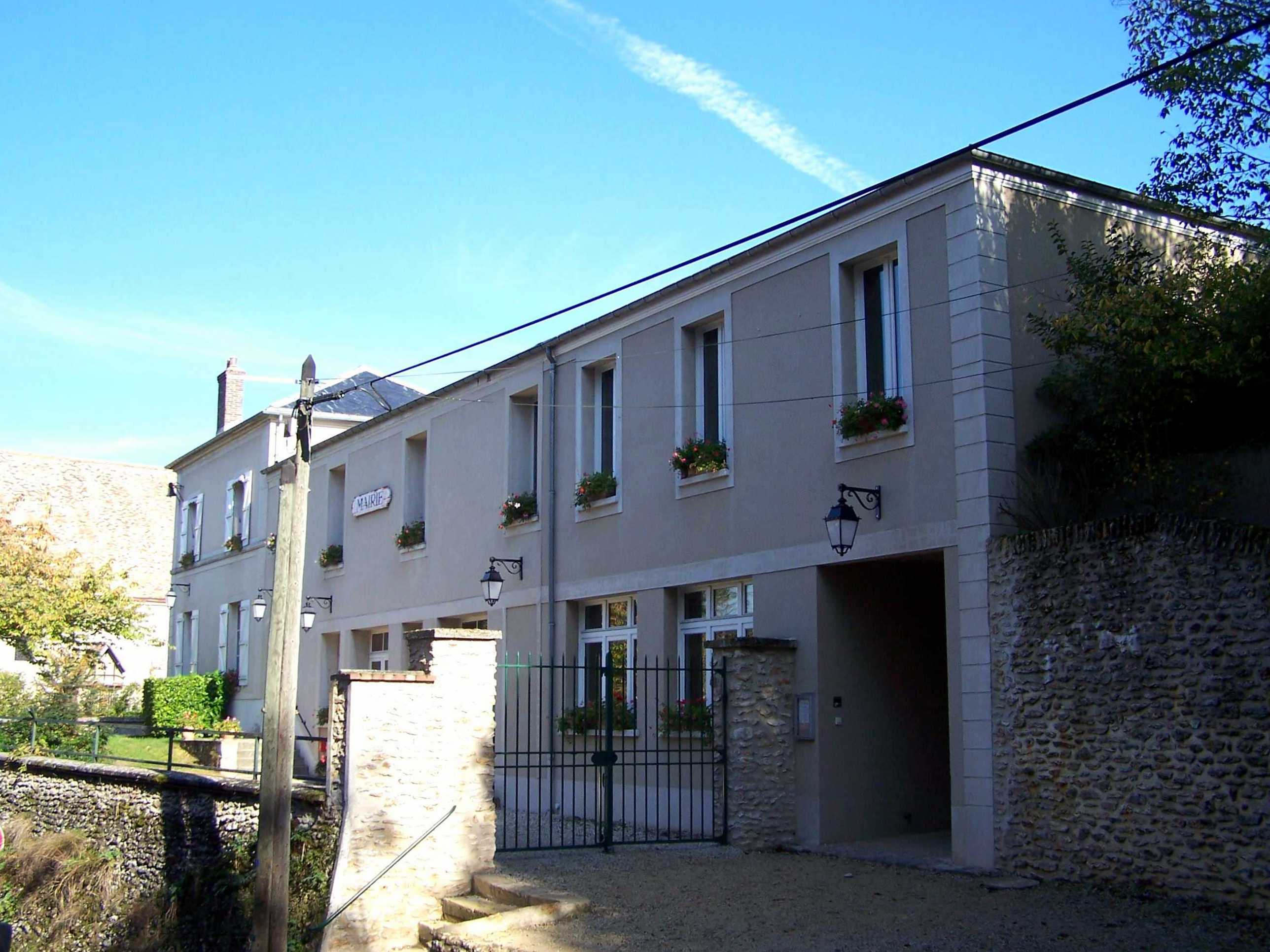
- Town hall
- Location of Grosrouvre
- Location within France Location within Île-de-France (region)
- Coordinates: 48°46′59″N 1°45′47″E
- Country: France
- Region: Île-de-France
- Department: Yvelines
- Arrondissement: Rambouillet
- Canton: Aubergenville

Government
  - Mayor (2020–2026): Yves Lambert
- Area^{1}: 12.43 km^{2} (4.80 sq mi)
- Elevation: 182 m (597 ft)
- Highest elevation: 185 m (607 ft)
- Lowest elevation: 119 m (390 ft)
- Population (2023): 902
  - Density: 72.6/km^{2} (188/sq mi)
- Time zone: UTC+01:00 (CET)
  - Summer (DST): UTC+02:00 (CEST)
- INSEE/Postal code: 78289 /78490
- ^{1} French Land Register data, which excludes lakes, ponds, glaciers > 1 km^{2} (0.386 sq mi or 247 acres) and river estuaries.

Grosrouvre (French pronunciation: [ɡʁoʁuvʁ]) is a commune in the Yvelines department in the Île-de-France region in north-central France.

== See also ==
- Communes of the Yvelines department
