= Battle of Chateauneuf-en-Thimerais =

Coordinates: 48.581°N 1.242°E

- Part of Franco-Prussian War
Date	18 November 1870
Location	Châteauneuf-en-Thymerais, Eure-et-Loir, France
Result	German Victory

Belligerents
French Republic	North German Confederation: Prussia

Commanders and leaders
Unknown	Ludwig von Wittich

Units involved
1 detachment consisting of 8 battalions	22nd Division

Casualties and losses
300 people killed and wounded, 200 people were captured	110 killed

The Battle of Chateauneuf-en-Thimerais was a battle of the Franco-Prussian War, which took place on 18 November 1870 in the commune of Châteauneuf-en-Thymerais in France. This was one of a series of victories by a division of the Prussian army along the Loire under the command of Frederick Francis II, Grand Duke of Mecklenburg-Schwerin before the Garde Mobile's forces fledgling by commander Minister Fiereck, within a week after the Imperial German Army was defeated at the Battle of Coulmiers. During the Battle of Châteauneuf-en-Thimerais, the 22nd Division of the Kingdom of Prussia – noted as a brave division – was under the command of General Friedrich Wilhelm Ludwig von Wittich who captured the commune, taking in his hands hundreds of French prisoners of war. The failure at this battle forced the French forces to retreat westward.

== The Battle ==
On 17 November 1870, the Grand Duke of Mecklenburg-Schwerin attacked a French army led by General Kératry which was part of the French Western Army led by General Yves-Louis Fiereck at the Battle of Dreux, and captured Dreux from the opponent's hand. While the Germans took 200 French prisoners, the French were forced to retreat to Châteauneuf-en-Thymerais. After this victory, Mecklenburg pursued the enemy, and on 18 November his army advanced through Châteauneuf, south of Dreux. Here, his army encountered a French army from Senonches with 8 battalions, which was marching towards Dreux. The Prussians under Mecklenburg succeeded in driving the French out of the forests and hills, and the French did not hold their positions. While the fighting at Châteauneuf-en-Thymerais resulted in Prussian losses of 110 men, the French army suffered 500 casualties. Among them, 300 were killed and wounded, 200 were taken prisoner. According to the document of the communist theorist Friedrich Engels on the war of 1870–1871, the French army that lost the Battle at Châteauneuf may have been part of the Army of Loire under General Louis d'Aurelle de Paladines, but certainly not this army. But actually, this is a force under Fiereck. The Germans suspected that the Loire Corps was making a move from Dreux to Paris, but in fact the French legion was still operating in front of Orléans. With the victory at Châteauneuf, the German forces repelled the threat posed by the French to the Siege of Paris.

After General Von Wittich's victory at Châteauneuf-en-Thimerais, the Prussian forces under him resumed their advance. On 19 January 1871, they advanced from Châteauneuf to Digny, capturing a number of French Garde Mobile soldiers. While the entire Army of the West to conduct retreating Chartres to Châteaudun, HRH Prince Friedrich Karl of Prussia pulled the infantry regiments to Beaune-la-Rolande and Montargis to flank the Corps Loire of France. The military situation of the Western Army became chaotic during the retreat to Châteaudun. The division of the Grand Duke of Mecklenburg united with the Prince's army, and on 28 November, the French general Paladines was defeated at the Battle of Beaune-la-Rolande.
