= Battle of Varize =

1870 Battle in the Franco-Prussian War

- Part of Franco-Prussian War
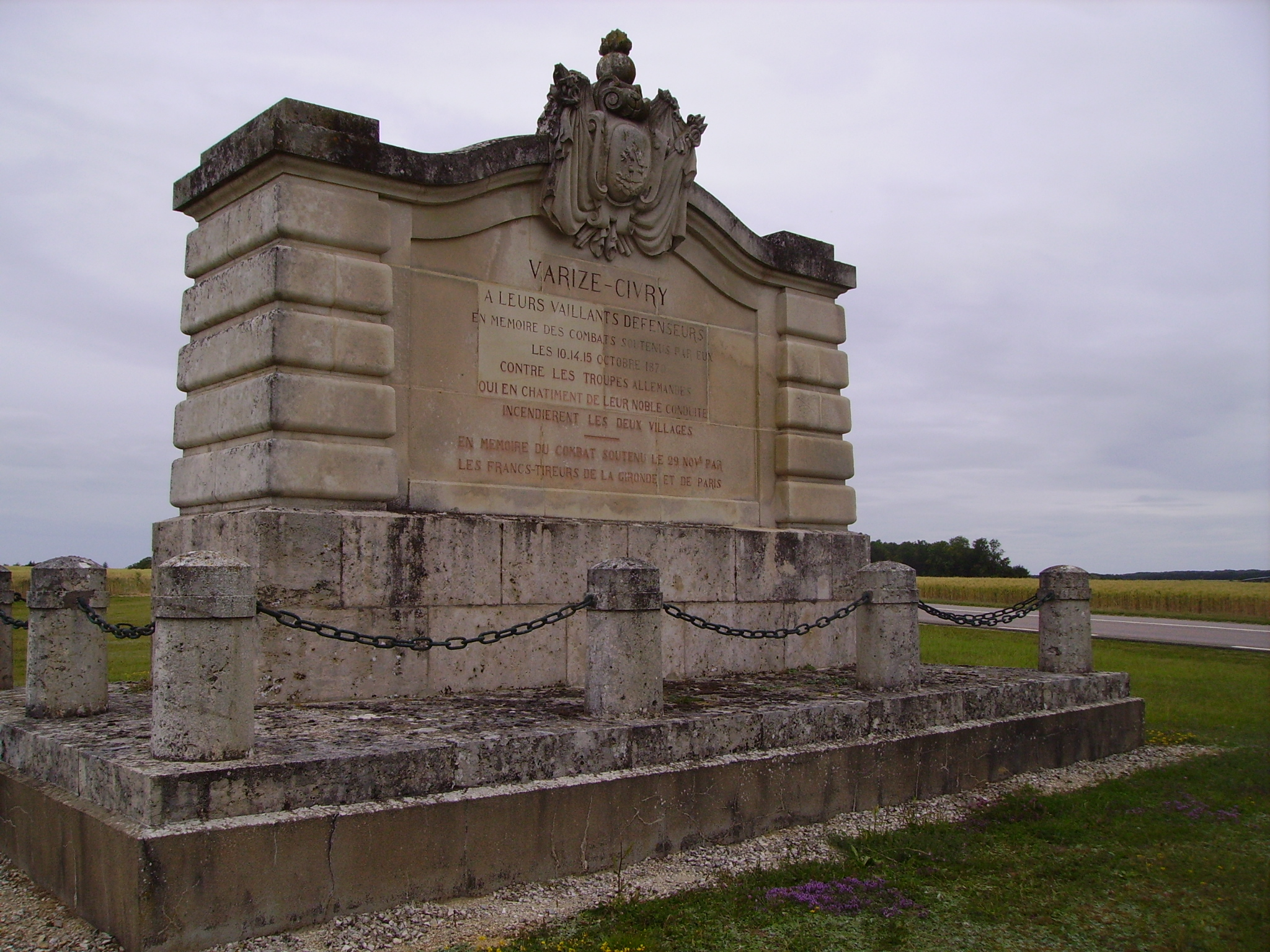
- Memorial of the Battle
Date	29 November 1870
Location	Varize, Eure-et-Loir, France
Result	Bavarian Victory

Belligerents
French Republic	Bavaria

Commanders and leaders
Ernest de Lipowski	Ludwig von der Tann-Rathsamhausen

Units involved
Franc-Tireur's	I Corps

Casualties and losses
10 soldiers died, 37 were wounded, 100 were taken prisoner	450 casualties

The Battle of Varize took place during the Franco-Prussian War on 29 November 1870, in Varize, on the river Conie. In this battle, the First Bavarian Corps under the command of Lieutenant General Infantry Ludwig von der Tann attacked a guerrilla army franc-tireurs of the French Republic under the command of Colonel Ernest de Lipowski, and made them scatter. Despite this, the defense at Varize enabled General Antoine Chanzy, commander of the French Army of Loire, to establish a defensive formation against the Prussian army under the direction of Friedrich Franz II, Grand Duke of Mecklenburg-Schwerin. With their victory at the Battle of Varize, Bavarian forces captured a number of well-equipped French guerrillas.

== Battle ==
The Bavarian I Corps under General Von der Tann, was on its way from Châteaudun to Orgires, as it approached Civry, they attacked several French franc-tireur guerilla detachments led by Colonel Lipowski at Varize. After the German midfield batteries fired several rounds, the French were driven out of their defensive positions. Subsequently, two German battalions invaded and captured the post-war Varize which was left for prisoners of war. French resistance at Varize failed. Although German casualties numbered 450, when the cavalry scouts on the right found that the vicinity was empty of French troops, the Bavarian I Corps resumed its march and reached Orgferes at 11 o'clock. The battle cost the French 147 men, of whom 10 were killed, 37 wounded, while 100 were captured.

On 1 December 1870 General Chanzy, in command of the French Army of Loire, attacked the Bavarians at the Battle of Villepion to eliminate the threat to the north. This was the second and final victory of the Loire Army over the German army. On 2 December Prussian forces led by Mecklenburg defeated Chanzy at the Battle of Loigny-Poupry.
