= Battle of Châteaudun =

Franco-Prussian War battle

- Part of Franco-Prussian War
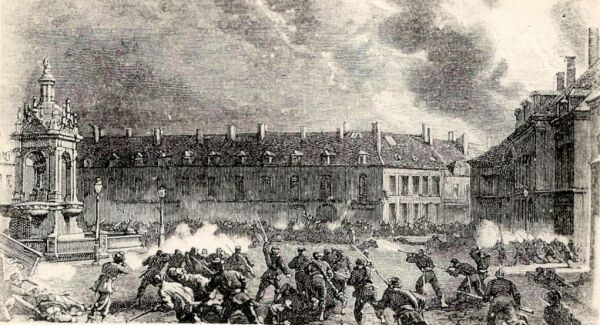
Date	18 October 1870
Location	Châteaudun, Eure-et-Loir, France 48°04′N 1°20′E
Result	German victory

Belligerents
French Republic	North German Confederation: Prussia

Commanders and leaders
Ernest de Lipowski	Ludwig von Wittich

Strength
1,200 – 4,000 Infantry	12,000 Infantry, 24 artillery pieces, 2 howitzers

Casualties and losses
150 Captured	"High" Casualties
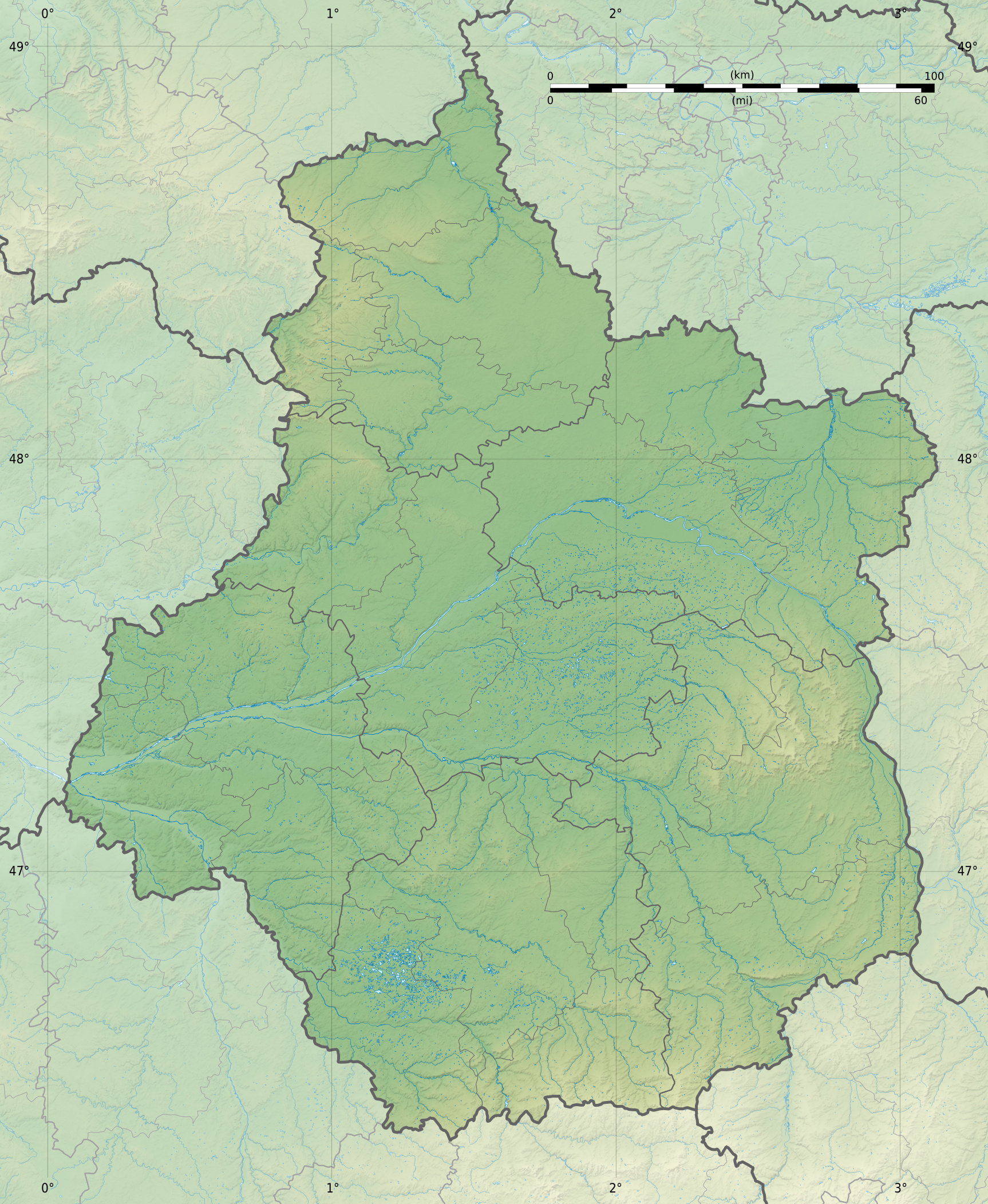
- Location within Centre-Val de Loire Battle of Châteaudun (France)

The Battle of Châteaudun took place in northwestern France during the Franco-Prussian War on 18 October 1870. In this battle, the Imperial German Army led by General Friedrich Wilhelm Ludwig von Wittich attacked the city of Châteaudun and captured the city. During the nine-hour battle the attackers defeated forces that included Francs-tireurs led by Ernest de Lipowski who was of Polish origin. Although it ended in defeat, the resistance of the French army at Châteaudun is recorded by one document as legendary. The fighting at Châteaudun was immortalized by a painting by Philippoteaux (the original of which is now located in the Châteaudun mayor's office).

== The Battle ==
Obeying orders, General Wittich, commander of the German 22nd Division advanced from Orléans to the northwest, and attacked Châteaudun on the Loire which was defended by Lipowski's irregular forces. Wittich's forces had the overwhelming advantage in numbers, and each French soldier fought 10 Prussians, while enduring heavy and fierce fire of the Prussian artillery. At around 6 p.m., the French obstacle course Rue Galante (Rue de Civry) was isolated and had to be given up. The advance of the Prussian army could not be repelled. French snipers retreated into the center of town even though it was dark. The Prussians were determined to capture the market place at Châteaudun, and they attacked in droves. A terrible battle broke out in the night, in which the two sides fought hand-to-hand. The Prussians were forced to capture each house one by one. Three times the French repelled the Prussians at Rues de Chartres (Rue Jean Moulin) and d'Orléans (Rue de la République), and dead bodies were piled up on the battlefield. Finally, the German army claimed victory, partly due to the strength of their artillery. Faced with a hopeless situation, Châteaudun was bombarded by the Germans and burned to ashes. The French irregulars holding Châteaudun then conducted a retreat, leaving behind a number of prisoners in the hands of the German army.

In retaliation for the resistance of the Franc-tireurs guerrillas and the French National Guard at Châteaudun, General Wittich bombarded Châteaudun and neighboring villages. Many houses were destroyed and some non-combatants, including women, were killed. On 21 October 1870 Wittich's division attacked Chartres, where their batteries repelled a French advancement, and Chartres surrendered to the Germans. As one of the fiercest generals in the Prussian army, Wittich was nicknamed "The Butcher of Châteaudun". The French retook Châteaudun on 6 November 1870.
