= Battle of Dreux (1870) =

Battle in Franco-Prussian War

- Part of Franco-Prussian War
Date	17 November 1870
Location	Dreux, Eure-et-Loir, France
Result	German victory

Belligerents
French Republic	North German Confederation: Prussia

Commanders and leaders
Captain Keratry	Friedrich Franz II

Strength
7,000 Infantry	5,000 troops, 12 cannons

Casualties and losses
Source 1 : 150 killed and wounded, 200 captured Source 2 : 200 killed and wounded (of whom 50 were captured)	Source 1: 104 people killed and wounded Source 2: 50 casualties

The Battle of Dreux was fought during the Franco-Prussian War, which took place on 17 November 1870. In this brief and drastic battle, the Prussian army who was commanded by Grand Duke Friedrich Franz II beat the French army who was commanded by Captain Keratry who ordered across the frontline and forcing the French to hurriedly flee, despite the numerical advantage of the French. The primary importance of the Prussian victory over Dreux in strengthening the frontline to its farthest and to weaken the French further to continue the Siege of Paris, and facilitate Minister Ludwig von der Tann of Bavaria who coordinated with Prince Friedrich Karl of Prussia to attack the French army under General Louis d'Aurelle de Paladines.

== The Battle ==
When Minister Yves-Louis Fiereck staged a breakout from the west of Paris which was under a siege, a mixture of forces from the Garde Mobile and French marines who were commanded by Captain Keatry, arrived into Dreux. Keatry's objective was to flank the German 5th Army at Versailles and patrol the weak points of the German front line. However, he did not complete his plan. At Dreux (which had been recaptured by the French from the Germans a few days earlier) he was attacked by several forces belonging to the Grand Duke of Mecklenburg. Several divisions of the German cavalry and the Bavarian army did not participate in the battle. French marines were credited for fighting bravely, attacking and massacring German artillerymen. However, the force Mobiles (except those who come from Calvados ) acted weak, and French marines, which have suffered heavy damage, to conduct evacuation. From 3 directions, the German army advanced against the town of Dreux, and they launched an artillery barragesize. On the streets of Dreux, they encountered fiercer resistance. The French army (including many between the ages of 14 and 16) fought behind floating fortifications, fleeing when the Germans approached, but then fired again. During the war, many French soldiers advocated forgiving the enemy at all. But the battle was a defeat for the French, in which the French suffered far greater losses than their opponents.

== Aftermath ==
At the end of the battle, Kéracy's western army fled behind the Châteunef. In general, the well-trained and disciplined German forces easily captured Dreux from the fiercely resisting French forces. After General Tresckow commander of the division of infantry of 17 master Dreux night 17 November, on 18 January the army of the great Duke of Mekclenburg continued its advance. On 19 January the German 22nd Division also attacked Digny, capturing several French soldiers. The entire western French army retreated towards Châteaudun.
