= Varize =

Varize may refer to the following places in France:

- Varize, Eure-et-Loir, a commune in the Eure-et-Loir department
- Varize, Moselle, a commune in the Moselle department
