= Ernest de Lipowski =

French general

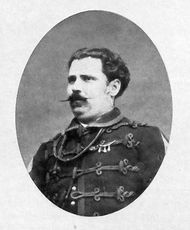
- Born: 12 June 1843; Strasbourg, Bas-Rhin, Kingdom of France
- Died: 23 February 1904 (aged 60); Paris, Seine, French Republic
- Burial place: Montparnasse Cemetery, Montparnasse, Paris, France
- Military career
- Allegiance: French Third Republic; Austria-Hungary; Russian Empire
- Branch: French Army; Austro-Hungarian Army; Imperial Russian Army
- Service years: 1870 – 1873; 1880 – 1904
- Conflicts: Franco-Prussian War: Battle of Châteaudun; Battle of Varize
- Awards: Legion of Honour; Order of Saint Anna; Order of the Black Star

Joseph Antoine Ernest, Comte de Lipowski was a French general of Polish origin that served the Franco-Prussian War and was notable for being the main French commander of several battles of the war.

== Biography ==
=== Early life and family ===
Ernest was born on 12 June 1843 in Strasbourg as the son of Pierre Nicolas Joseph Albert de Lipowski and Marguerite Sophie Laroche. He had two marriages with his first wife being Marie Eggerickx who died within a few years, and then with Marianne Eastwood in 1876.

=== Military career ===
After graduating from the École spéciale militaire de Saint-Cyr, he became an officer but initially resigned this position due to several financial embarrassments. He later returned to military service when the Franco-Prussian War broke out and commanded the French forces at the battles of Châteaudun and Varize. For his service at Châteaudun, he was awarded the Legion of Honour, knight class. He was sidelined in the Paris Commune due to his friendship with Napoléon La Cécilia who was a communard and who had also served at Châteaudun.

Lipowski also participated in the Siege of Paris on 8 October 1870 as the main commander of 130 Francs-tireurs from Denonville as they attacked the 4th Squadron of the 16th Cavalry Regiment from Schleswig-Holstein and the 11th Cavalry Regiment from Bavaria that were stationed at Albis. The snipers fell back, taking 70 prisoners and 200 horses. In retaliation for this attack, known as the Ablis surprise, the Germans burned 120 houses, shot 6 residents and took 22 hostages to their headquarters in Le Mesnil-Saint-Denis who were finally released the next day.

=== Later years ===
In his later years of military service, he served in the armies of Austria-Hungary and the Russian Empire simultaneously when in 1873, he was caught committing escroquerie as Lipowski had a large amount of unpaid bills but avoided prosecution in Switzerland due to being a French citizen but was removed from the records of the Legion due to this.

His service at Austria-Hungary isn't well known but it was documented that he briefly served in the 41st regiment of the Austro-Hungarian Army and during his final years, served as a commander in the Russian Empire until his death on 23 February 1904 in Paris.
