= Francs-tireurs =

Irregular military units or guerrilla fighters

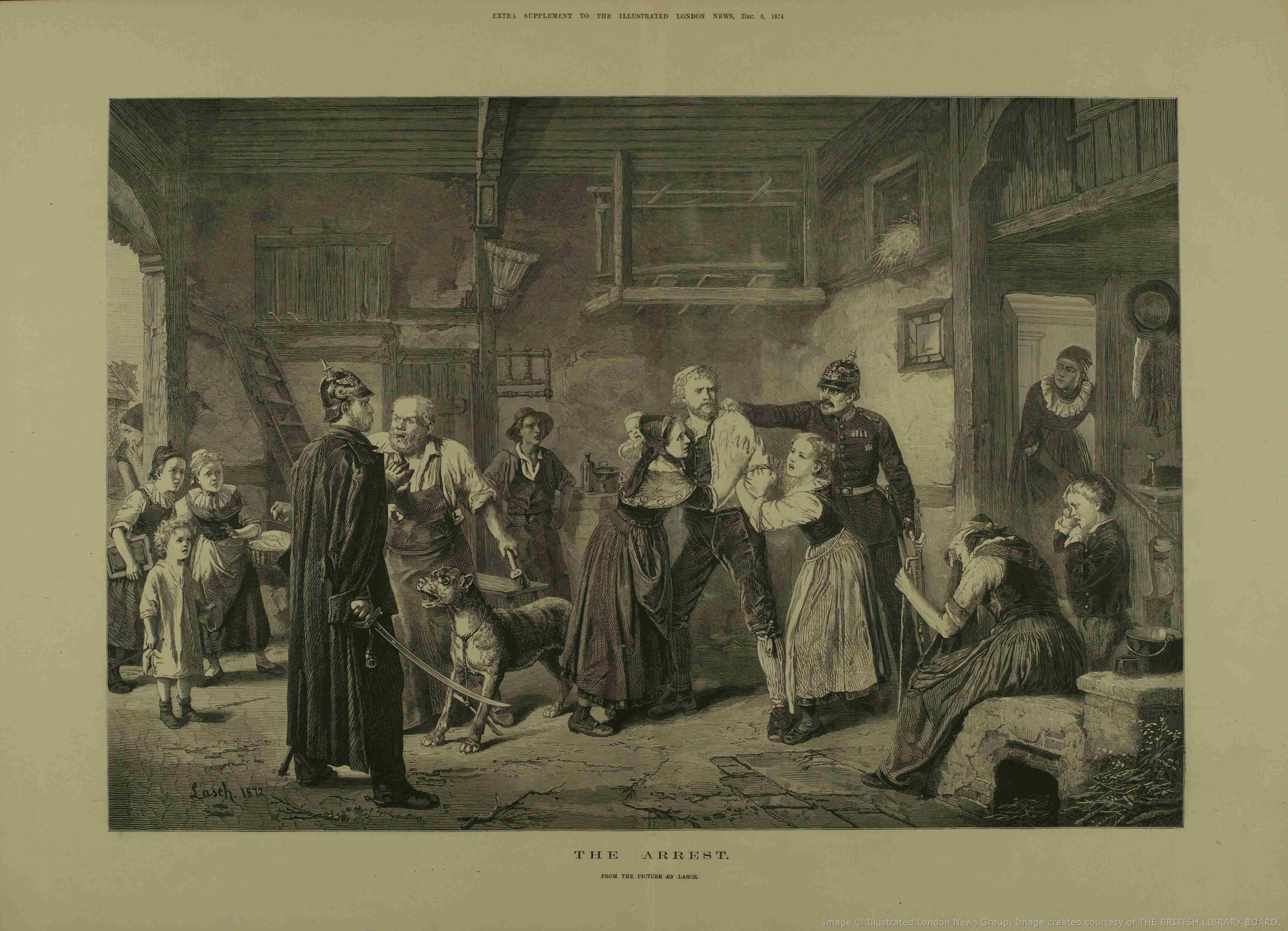
Capture of a Franc-tireur, by Carl Johann Lasch

Francs-tireurs (French: [fʁɑ̃.ti.ʁœʁ]; French for 'free shooters') were irregular military formations deployed by France during the early stages of the Franco-Prussian War (1870–71). The term was revived and used by partisans to name two major French Resistance movements set up to fight against Nazi Germany during World War II.

Francs-tireurs were among the first to be prosecuted as unlawful combatants or non-state actors, marking them inadmissible under traditional hors de combat law. The term is sometimes used to refer more generally to guerrilla fighters who operate outside the laws of war.

== Background ==
During the wars of the French Revolution, a franc-tireur was a member of a corps of light infantry organised separately from the regular army.

== Franco-Prussian War ==
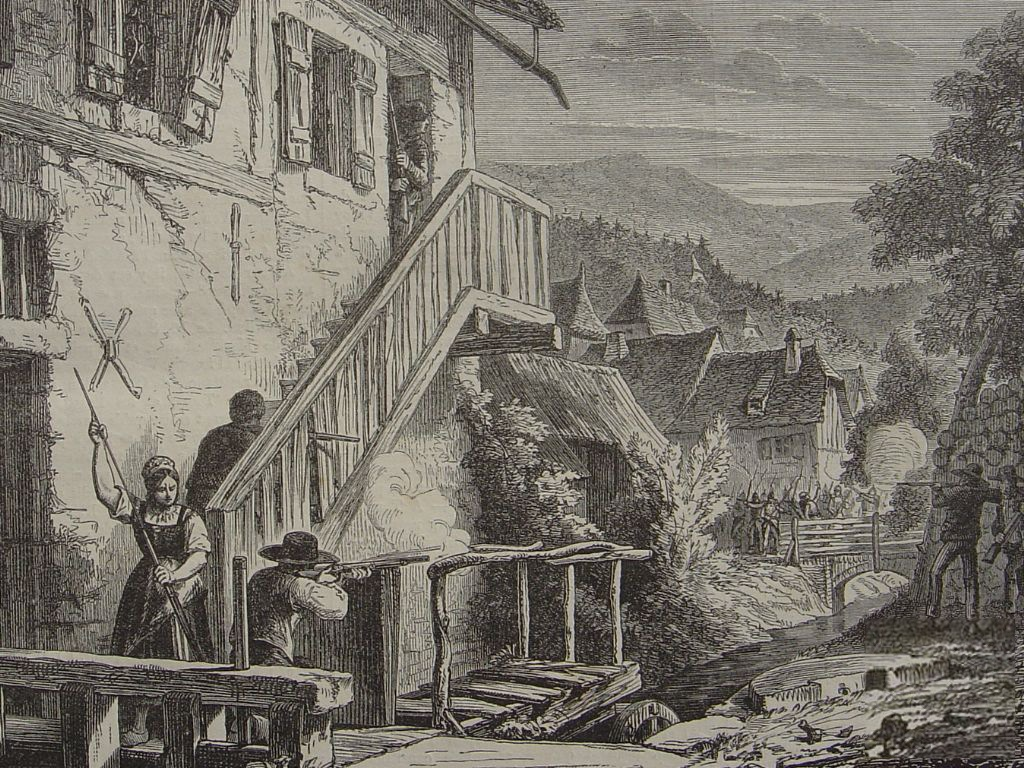
Francs-tireurs in the Vosges during the Franco-Prussian War

Francs-tireurs were an outgrowth of rifle-shooting clubs or unofficial military societies formed in the east of France at the time of the Luxembourg Crisis of 1867. The members were chiefly concerned with the practise of rifle-shooting. In case of war, they were expected to act as militia or light troops. They wore no uniforms, but they armed themselves with the best existing rifles, and elected their own officers.

The 1911 Encyclopædia Britannica described them as "at once a valuable asset to the armed strength of France and a possible menace to internal order under military discipline." The societies strenuously and effectively resisted all efforts to bring them under normal military discipline.

In July 1870, at the outbreak of the Franco-Prussian War, the French minister of war assumed control over the societies to organise them for field service. It was not until 4 November, by which time the levée en masse (universal conscription) was in force, that the militias were placed under the orders of the generals in the field. They were sometimes organised in large bodies and incorporated in the mass of the armies, but more usually they continued to work in small bands, blowing up culverts on the invaders' lines of communication, cutting off small reconnaissance parties, surprising small posts, etc.

The 1911 Encyclopædia Britannica describes it as "now acknowledged, even by the Germans", that the francs-tireurs, by these relatively unconventional tactics, "paralysed large detachments of the enemy, contested every step of his advance (as in the Loire campaign), and prevented him from gaining information, and that their soldierly qualities improved with experience."

Francs-tireurs blew up the Moselle railway bridge at Fontenoy-sur-Moselle, on 22 January 1871. The defense of Châteaudun (18 October 1870) was conducted by francs-tireurs of Cannes and Nantes, along with Ernest de Lipowski's Paris corps.

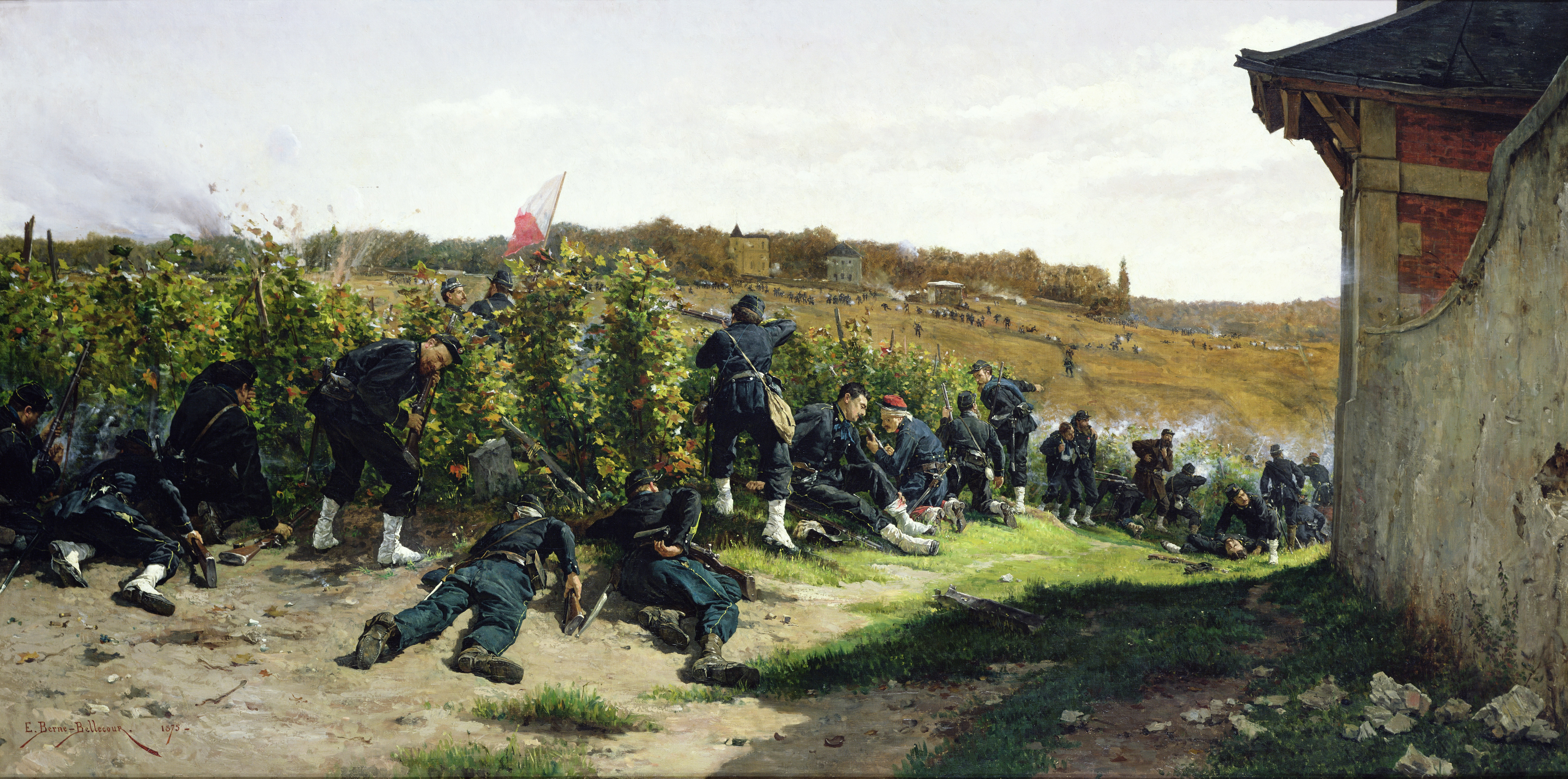
Berne-Bellecour, Les Tirailleurs de la Seine au combat de Rueil-Malmaison (1875).

The Francs-tireurs de la Seine included the artists Étienne-Prosper Berne-Bellecour, Hector Leroux, Gustave Jacquet, Alexandre-Louis Leloir, Jehan Georges Vibert, Jules Ferdinand Jacquemart, and the sculptor Joseph Cuvelier. "They fought bravely at Malmaison" in the Battle of Buzenval. Berne-Bellecour depicted the engagement in a painting made five years later.

The Germans executed captured francs-tireurs as irregular, armed non-combatants, essentially what also came to be called guerrillas or insurgents. The German armies and popular press vilified the francs-tireurs as murderers and highwaymen; the insurgents seemed to have a sense of the most vulnerable parts of the German armies in France. The Germans reacted to francs-tireurs ambushes with harsh reprisals against the nearest village or town, where they killed civilians. Whole regiments or divisions often took part in "pacifying actions" in areas with significant franc-tireur activity; this created a lasting enmity and hatred between the occupying German soldiers and French civilians.

== World War I ==
The experiences of French guerrilla attacks and of the asymmetric warfare during the Franco-Prussian War had a profound effect on the German General Staff. During World War I, they carried out an unusually harsh and severe occupation of areas which they conquered (see: Rape of Belgium). Hostages were regularly executed in response to reports of sniping in French and Belgian communities. Occupying German forces were reportedly very fearful of spontaneous civil resistance, which led to these arrests and executions, some of which were preemptive or at least before actual violent resistance. Most of the attacks attributed by the German occupiers to Belgian francs-tireurs were actually carried out by Belgian Army snipers.

After the war, General Erich Ludendorff, Germany's chief military strategist and its commander-in-chief on the Western Front at the end of the war, tried to defend German behaviour in his memoir published in 1919, the two-volume Meine Kriegserinnerungen, 1914–1918. It was published that same year in London by Hutchinson as My War Memories, 1914–1918 and in New York City by Harper as Ludendorff's Own Story, August 1914 – November 1918.

In an article in the 13 September 1919 issue of Illustrated London News, writer G. K. Chesterton responded to Ludendorff's book by remarking:

It is astounding how clumsy Prussians are at this sort of thing. Ludendorff cannot be a fool, at any rate, at his own trade; for his military measures were often very effective. But without being a fool when he effects his measures, he becomes a most lurid and lamentable fool when he justifies them. For in fact he could not have chosen a more unfortunate example. A franc-tireur is emphatically not a person whose warfare is bound to disgust any soldier. He is emphatically not a type about which a general soldierly spirit feels any bitterness. He is not a perfidious or barbarous or fantastically fiendish foe. On the contrary, a "franc-tireur" is generally a man for whom any generous soldier would be sorry, as he would for an honourable prisoner of war. What is a "franc-tireur"? A "franc-tireur" is a free man, who fights to defend his own farm or family against foreign aggressors, but who does not happen to possess certain badges and articles of clothing catalogued by Prussia in 1870. In other words, a "franc-tireur" is you or I or any other healthy man who found himself, when attacked, in accidental possession of a gun or pistol, and not in accidental possession of a particular cap or a particular pair of trousers. The distinction is not a moral distinction at all, but a crude and recent official distinction made by the militarism of Potsdam.

== World War II ==
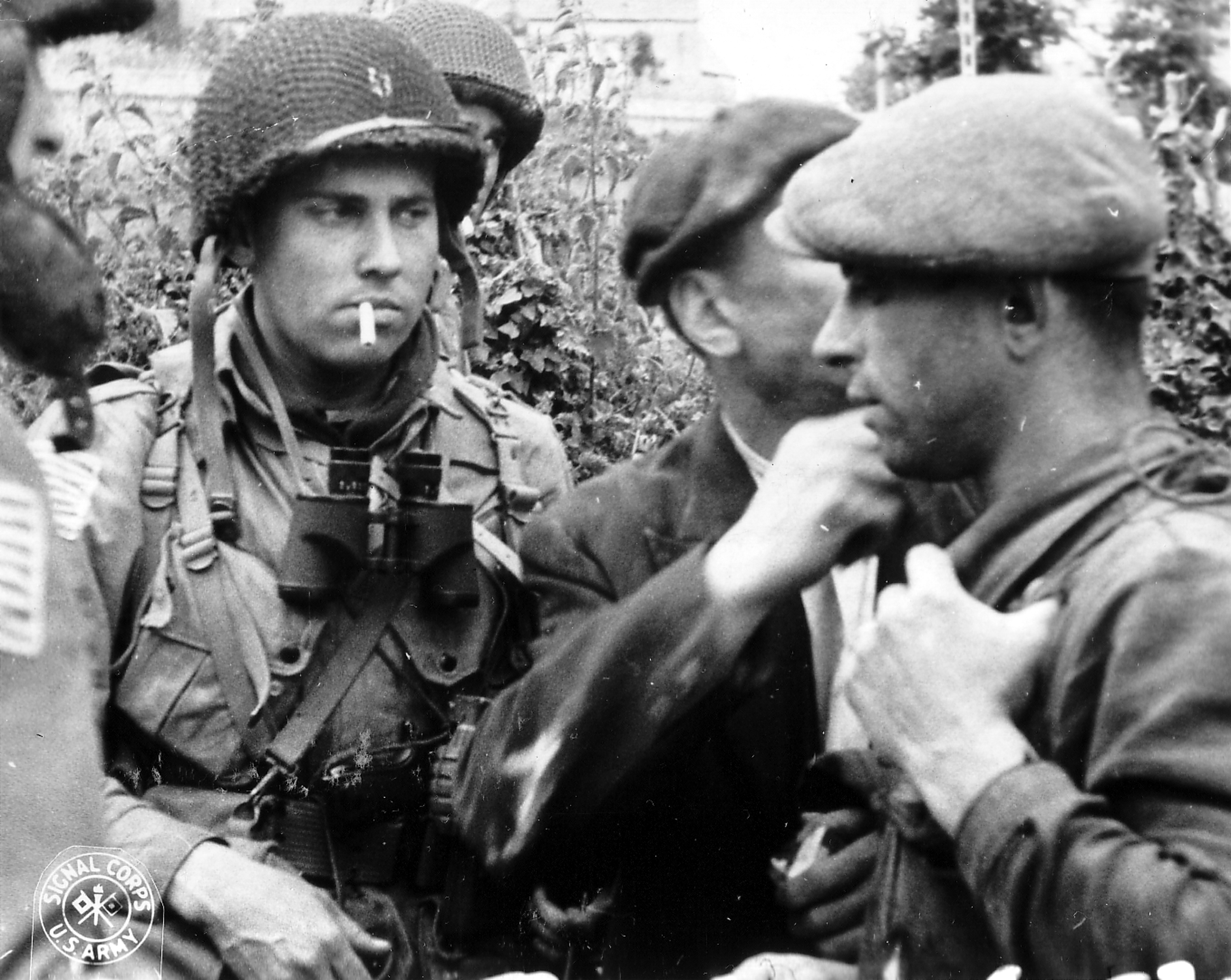
French francs-tireurs with US paratroopers during the Battle of Normandy

Two major resistance groups adopted the name Franc-Tireur during the German occupation of France during the Second World War. The first to be established was the Franc-Tireur group founded in Lyon in 1940. The second was the Francs-Tireurs et Partisans (FTP, Partisan irregular riflemen), which were established as the military branch of the French Communist Party (PCF). They only became active in the resistance after the German invasion of the Soviet Union in 1941.

Although individual communists had opposed the German occupation of France, the official communist position was not to offer resistance, as the Soviet Union was in a non-aggression pact with Germany. After the German invasion of the Soviet Union on 22 June 1941, this position changed. The PCF initially called their group the Organisation Spéciale (OS); a number of its leaders had served in the International Brigades during the Spanish Civil War (notably, "Colonel" Henri Rol-Tanguy).

A number of smaller resistance groups united in the Francs-Tireurs et Partisans (FTP) under Pierre Villon, the former editor of the magazine L’Humanité. Their job was four-fold: to destroy rail lines carrying men and materials to the eastern front, sabotage factories working for the Germans, punish traitors and collaborators, and kill the occupying soldiers. "A librarian called Michel Bernstein became a master forger of false documents." And "France Bloch, a young chemist with two science degrees, who as a Jew had lost her job in the French National Museum of Natural History, was given the job of making explosives." Bloch was arrested by the French police and beheaded by guillotine in Hamburg.

The FTP became the first resistance group in France to deliberately kill a German. In February 1944, the FTP agreed to merge with the Forces Françaises de l'Intérieur. The foreign workers' section of the FTP, the FTP-MOI (Francs-Tireurs et Partisans—Main d'Œuvre Immigrée), became especially famous after the Manouchian Group was captured, its members executed, and ten of its members advertised as foreign criminals by the infamous Affiche Rouge. The Manouchian Group operated in the Paris metropolitan area, but other FTP-MOI groups operated in Lyon and the South of France, where they carried out armed resistance. Many of its immigrant members throughout the country were Jewish artists, writers, and intellectuals, who had gone to France for the cultural circles in Paris. Others had taken refuge in France to escape Nazi persecution in their home countries. Alter Mojze Goldman, father of Pierre Goldman and Jean-Jacques Goldman were members of FTP-MOI, as was the Hungarian photographer, Ervin Marton, who achieved international recognition after the war.

The PETA (Indonesian: Pembela Tanah Air – Defenders of the Homeland) and Heiho soldiers in the Japanese-occupied Dutch East Indies were considered francs-tireurs by the Allies.

== Prisoner status ==
Before the two world wars, the term franc-tireur was sometimes used for an armed fighter who, if captured, was not necessarily entitled to prisoner of war status. An issue of disagreement at the 1899 Hague Conference, the controversy generated the Martens Clause. The Martens Clause was introduced as a compromise between the Great Powers, who considered francs-tireurs to be unlawful combatants subject to execution on capture, and smaller states, who maintained that they should be considered lawful combatants.

After World War II, during the Hostages Trial, the seventh of the Nuremberg Trials, the tribunal found that, on the question of partisans, according to the then-current laws of war, partisan fighters in southeast Europe could not be considered lawful belligerents under Article 1 of the Hague Convention. In relation to Wilhelm List, the tribunal stated:

We are obliged to hold that such guerrillas were francs tireurs who, upon capture, could be subjected to the death penalty. Consequently, no criminal responsibility attaches to the defendant List because of the execution of captured partisans...

The post-war Geneva Convention established new protocols; according to Article 4 of the Third Geneva Convention of 1949, francs-tireurs are entitled to prisoner-of-war status provided that they are commanded by a person responsible for his subordinates, have a fixed distinctive sign recognisable at a distance, carry arms openly, and conduct their operations in accordance with the laws and customs of war.

== Other uses ==
Le Franc-Tireur was the name of an underground French Resistance newspaper published by the group in Lyon by the same name.

== See also ==
- French Resistance
- Maquis (World War II)
