= Nicolas Chaperon =

French painter (c.1612–1656)

- Born: 19 October 1612; Châteaudun
- Died: 1656 (aged 43–44); Rome
- Occupation: Painter, drawer

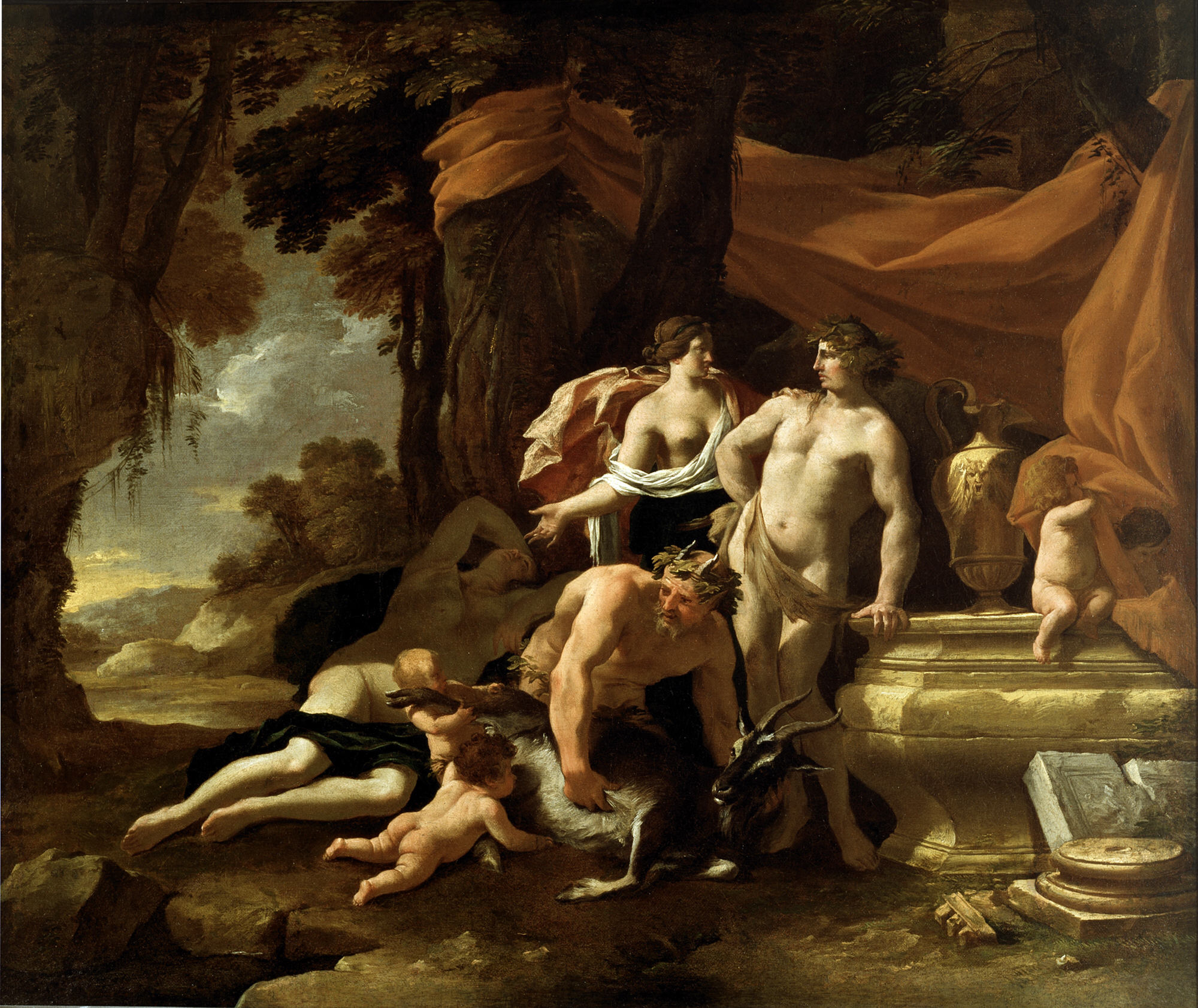
The Union of Venus and Bacchus, 1639, Dallas Museum of Art

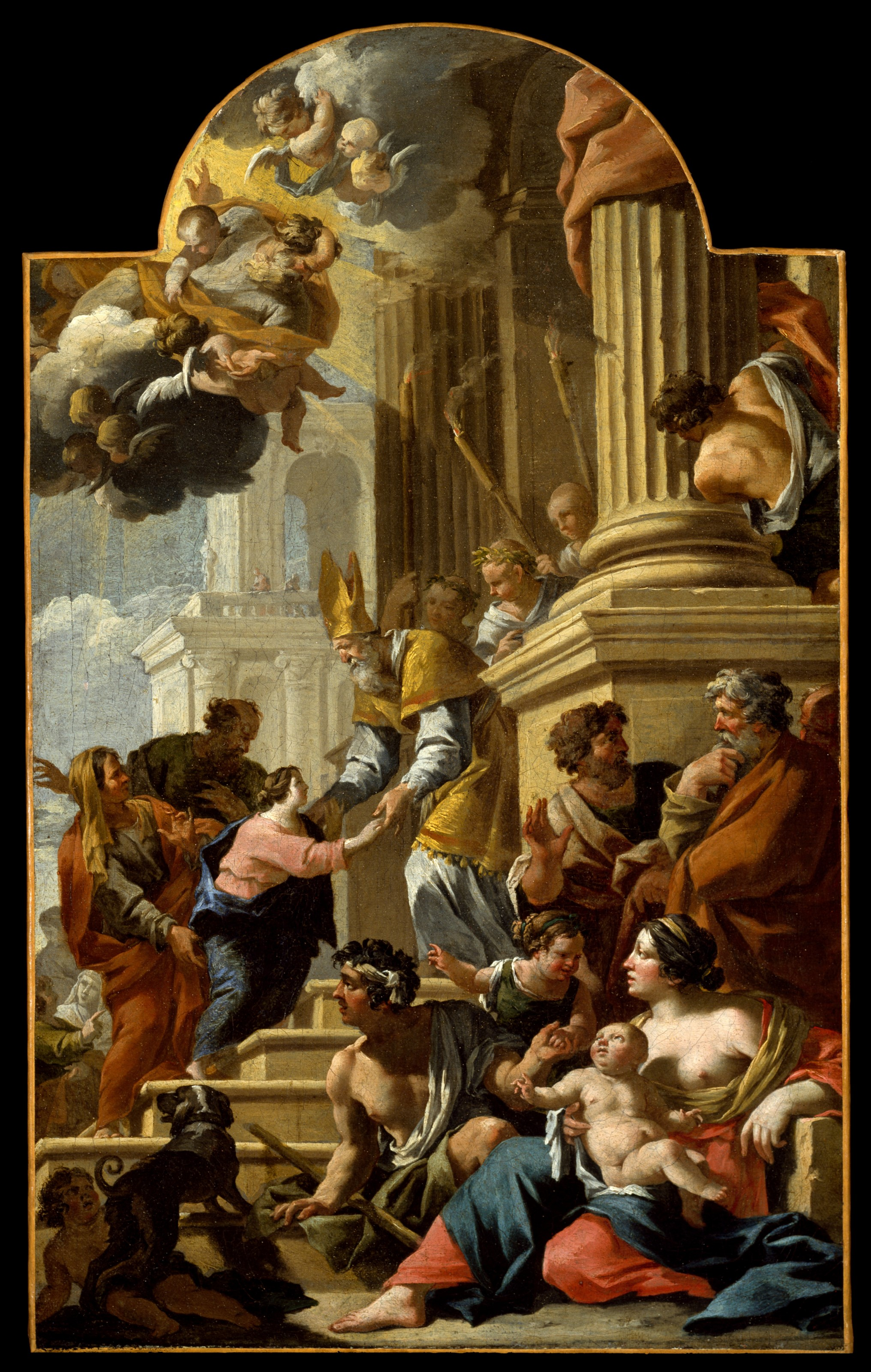
The Presentation of the Virgin in the Temple, Museum of Fine Arts, Houston

Nicolas Chaperon (bapt. 19 October 1612, in Châteaudun – 1656 in Lyon) was a French painter, draughtsman and engraver, a student in Paris of Simon Vouet whose style he adopted before his stay in Rome (1642–51) in the studio of Nicolas Poussin, when his approach developed further.

Chaperon made a name for himself with his suite of engravings after the Raphael Loggie of the Vatican, Rome, 1649, but art historians remember him primarily for the stream of fulminating invective with which Poussin in his correspondence with Paul Fréart de Chantelou described this unruly and vindictive practician who refused to carry through his copy of a Transfiguration. So little is known of Chaperon that this episode stands out.

In 1653-55 the consuls de Lyon invited him to decorate the hôtel de ville but he died shortly after he arrived, and the commission passed to Thomas Blanchet.

Most of his paintings were optimistically attributed to Poussin, and disguised under that sellable name entered collections in the US; thus, when the Musée du Louvre purchased its first painting by Chaperon in 2005, it was at a New York auction. Jacques Thuillier’s publication of Chaperon's signed and dated Compiègne altarpiece, a Presentation of the Virgin, began the reassessment of this Poussiniste.

== Selected works ==
All works are in oil on canvas unless otherwise noted.

- The Vow of Midas, Kunstmuseum, Basel, 1,00 x 1,36.
- The Nurture of Jupiter, Ackland Museum, Chapel Hill, NC, 0,99 x 1,36.
- Presentation of the Virgin (1639), Chapelle Saint-Nicolas, Compiègne. An oil sketch is at the Museum of Fine Arts, Houston.
- The Alliance of Bacchus and Venus, Dallas Museum of Art, 0,76 x 0,98. the painting was identified in 1960, on the basis of a signed engraving of it.
- Bacchanale, Musée Magnin, Dijon.
- Drunken Silenus, Uffizi, 1,15 x 0,84.
- Holy Family with SS Elizabeth and the infant John the Baptist Gosford House, East Lothian, Scotland (The Earl of Wemyss and March) 1,46 x 1,20.. A preparatory drawing at the Musée du Louvre.
- Penitent Magdalene, *Musée des Beaux-Arts, Nancy, 0.75 x 0.61, Purchased 2006.
- Moses and the Bronze Serpent, Musée des Beaux-Arts, Nîmes, 1,225 x 1, 715. Purchased 1998.
- Venus, Mercury and Cupid, Musée du Louvre, 1,10 x 1,34 Purchased 2005.
- Childhood of Bacchus, Musée Sainte-Croix, Poitiers.
- Presentation of the Virgin, Musée des Beaux-Arts, Rennes, 0,635 x 0,480.
- The Deluge, Musée des Beaux-Arts, Rouen, 0,998 x 1,385.
- Bacchus and Ariadne, formerly collection François Heim.

Drawings by Nicolas Chaperon are in the collections of Besançon, Musée des Beaux-Arts et d'Archéologie; Bibliothèque nationale de France; École nationale supérieure des Beaux-Arts; Musée du Louvre
