= Ludwig von Wittich =

- Friedrich Wilhelm Ludwig von Wittich
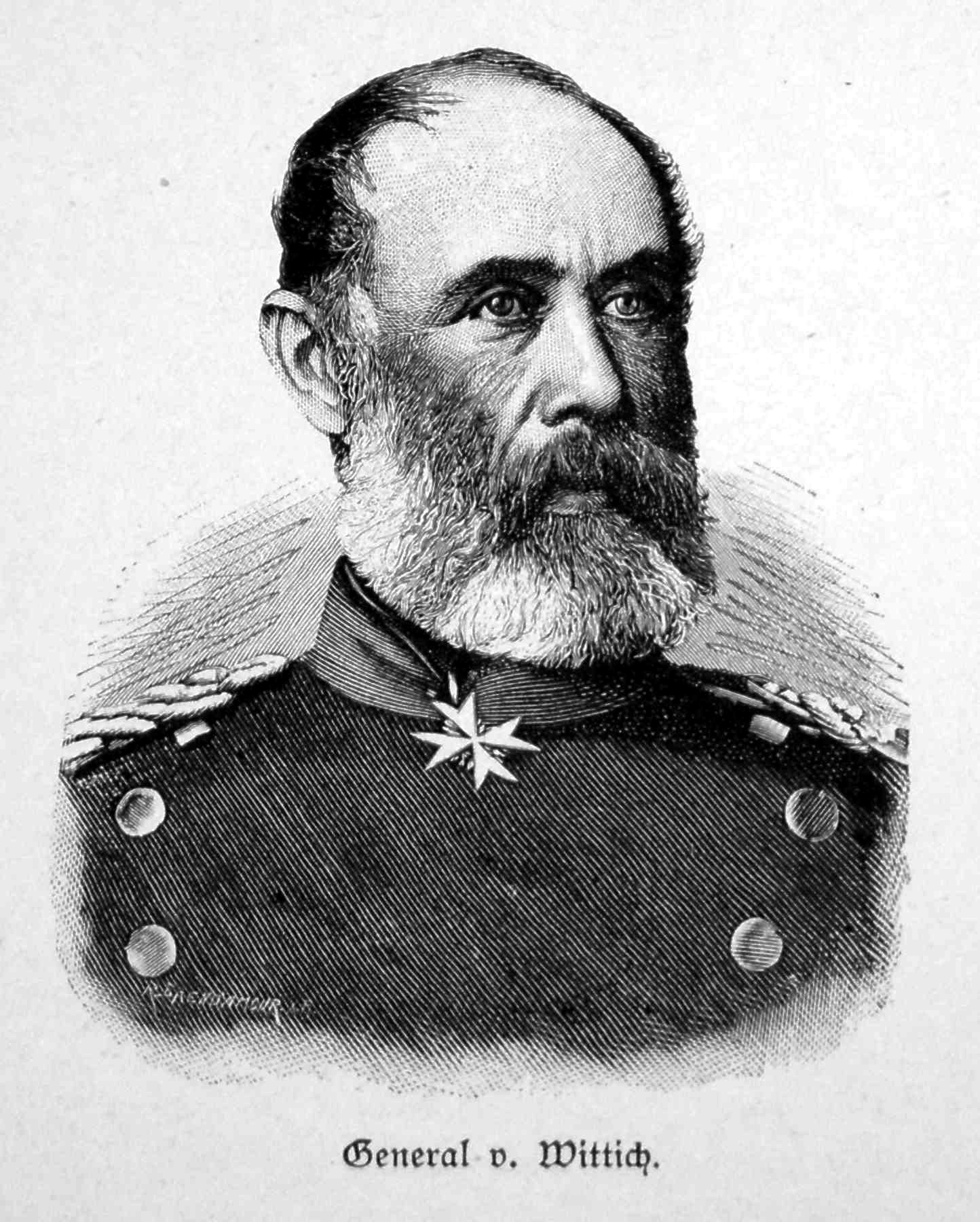
- Born: October 15, 1818; Münster, Province of Westphalia, Kingdom of Prussia
- Died: August 2, 1884 (aged 65); Neumark, Province of Brandenburg, German Empire
- Military career
- Allegiance: Kingdom of Prussia; North German Confederation; German Empire
- Branch: Prussian Army; Imperial German Army
- Service years: 1835–1873
- Rank: Lieutenant General
- Commands: 22nd Division; 31st Division
- Conflicts: Austro-Prussian War; Franco-Prussian War: Battle of Châteaudun; Battle of Chateauneuf-en-Thimerais
- Awards: Pour le Mérite with oak leaves
- Other work: From my diary 1870-1871. Kassel 1872.

Friedrich Wilhelm Ludwig von Wittich was a Prussian lieutenant general and a member of the Reichstag.

== Biography ==
He was the son of the later Prussian Major General Karl August von Wittich (1772–1831) and his wife Christiane Johanna Friederike Elisabeth, née von Redern (1780–1842).

Von Wittich received his education in the cadet corps and joined the Prussian Army in 1835 as a second lieutenant. In 1844 he became an adjutant on the staff of the 2nd Division and in 1852 of the V Corps staff. Promoted to major in 1857, he was transferred to the staff of the 9th Division and in 1861 back to the V Corps. On October 18 he was promoted to lieutenant colonel.

In 1863 von Wittich became Chief of Staff of the II Corps and in 1864 of the IV Corps. As the latter, with the rank of colonel, he distinguished himself in the Austro-Prussian War and received the prestigious Pour le Mérite for his services. On March 22, 1868 he became major general and commander of the 49th (1st Grand Ducal Hessian) Infantry Brigade. He led his unit during the Franco-Prussian War in the battles of Vionville, Gravelotte and Noisseville. On September 22, 1870, he was appointed commander of the 22nd Division (German Empire)22nd Division. With his division he participated in the arduous and long operations along the Loire and against Le Mans from October 1870 to January 1871. In the course of these battles he fought under General von der Tann on October 10 in the Battle of Artenay, on the 11th at Orléans and on the 18th in the assault on Châteaudun. On October 21 he occupied Chartres and then fought under the Grand Duke of Mecklenburg-Schwerin on December 2 at the Battle of Loigny–Poupry, on 3 and 4 again at Orléans, from 8 to 10 at Battle of Beaugency. Before the turn of the year he received the oak leaves to the Pour le Merite. He also contributed significantly to the victories in the Battle of Le Mans (January 10 to 12) and at Alençon (January 15).

Afterwards, on August 18, 1871, von Wittich was promoted to lieutenant general. On March 18, 1872, he was appointed commander of the 31st Division in Strasbourg. He retired from service in April 1873. In 1889 the 83rd (3rd Kurhessian) Infantry Regiment "von Wittich" was named after him in his honor.

From 1879 to 1881 von Wittich was a member of the German Reichstag for the German Conservative Party and the Landsberg constituency.

He married Johanna Albertine Luise Anna Hiller von Gaertringen on June 16, 1863 (* October 21, 1833). She was the widow of Anton von Bredelow (1818–1861) and daughter of Chamberlain Rudolf Hiller von Gaertringen († October 27, 1866) and Sophie von Motz. The later MP Hans Joachim von Brederlow was his stepson.

== Bibliography ==
- Ludwig von Wittich biography in Heinrich Best, Datenbank der Abgeordneten der Reichstage des Kaiserreichs 1867/71 bis 1918 (Biorab – Kaiserreich)
