= Napoléon La Cécilia =

French general

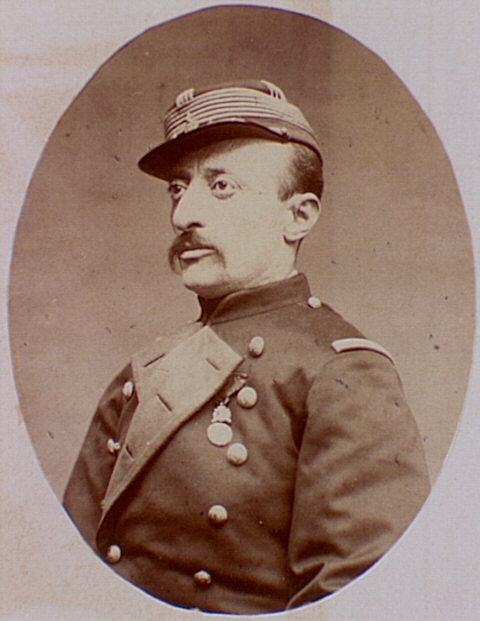
- Born: September 13, 1835; Tours, France
- Died: November 25, 1878 (aged 43); Alexandria, Egypt
- Occupation: General
- Spouse: Marie David

Napoléon La Cécilia (French pronunciation: [napɔleɔ̃ la sesilja]; 13 September 1835 – 25 November 1878) was a French general.
