= Varize, Eure-et-Loir =

Varize
- Commune
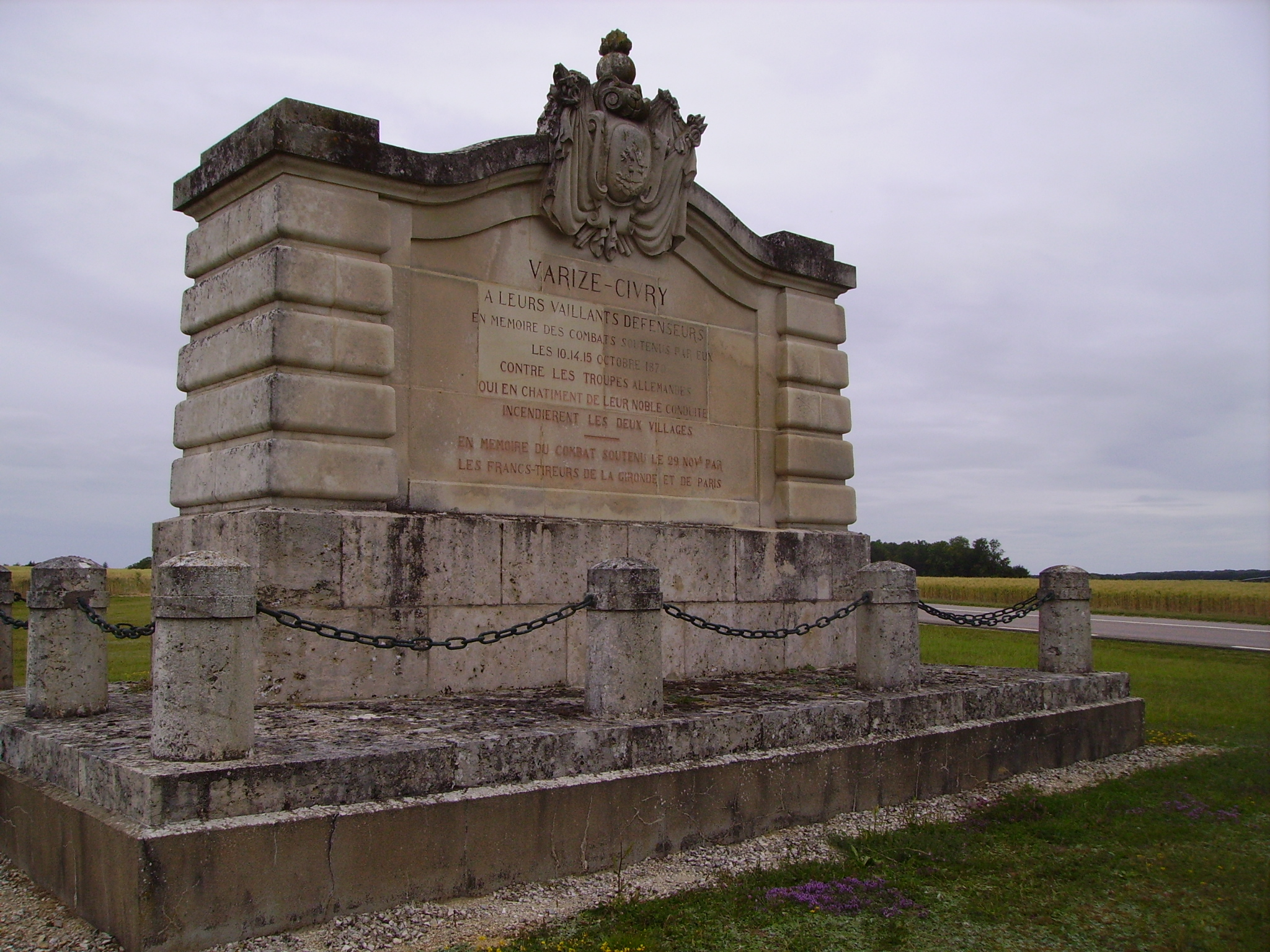
- War memorial
- Location of Varize
- Location within France Location within Centre-Val de Loire
- Coordinates: 48°05′44″N 1°30′52″E
- Country: France
- Region: Centre-Val de Loire
- Department: Eure-et-Loir
- Arrondissement: Châteaudun
- Canton: Les Villages Vovéens

Government
  - Mayor (2020–2026): Philippe Gaucheron
- Area^{1}: 13.85 km^{2} (5.35 sq mi)
- Elevation: 118 m (387 ft)
- Highest elevation: 137 m (449 ft)
- Lowest elevation: 112 m (367 ft)
- Population (2023): 184
  - Density: 13.3/km^{2} (34.4/sq mi)
- Time zone: UTC+01:00 (CET)
  - Summer (DST): UTC+02:00 (CEST)
- INSEE/Postal code: 28400 /28140
- ^{1} French Land Register data, which excludes lakes, ponds, glaciers > 1 km^{2} (0.386 sq mi or 247 acres) and river estuaries.

Varize (French pronunciation: [vaʁiz]) is a commune in the Eure-et-Loir department in northern France.

== Population ==
Historical population
Year	Pop.	±% p.a.
1968	222	—
1975	189	−2.27%
1982	176	−1.01%
1990	180	+0.28%
1999	167	−0.83%
2007	205	+2.60%
2012	207	+0.19%
2017	196	−1.09%
2023	184	−1.05%
Source: INSEE

== See also ==
- Communes of the Eure-et-Loir department
