= Digny =

- Commune
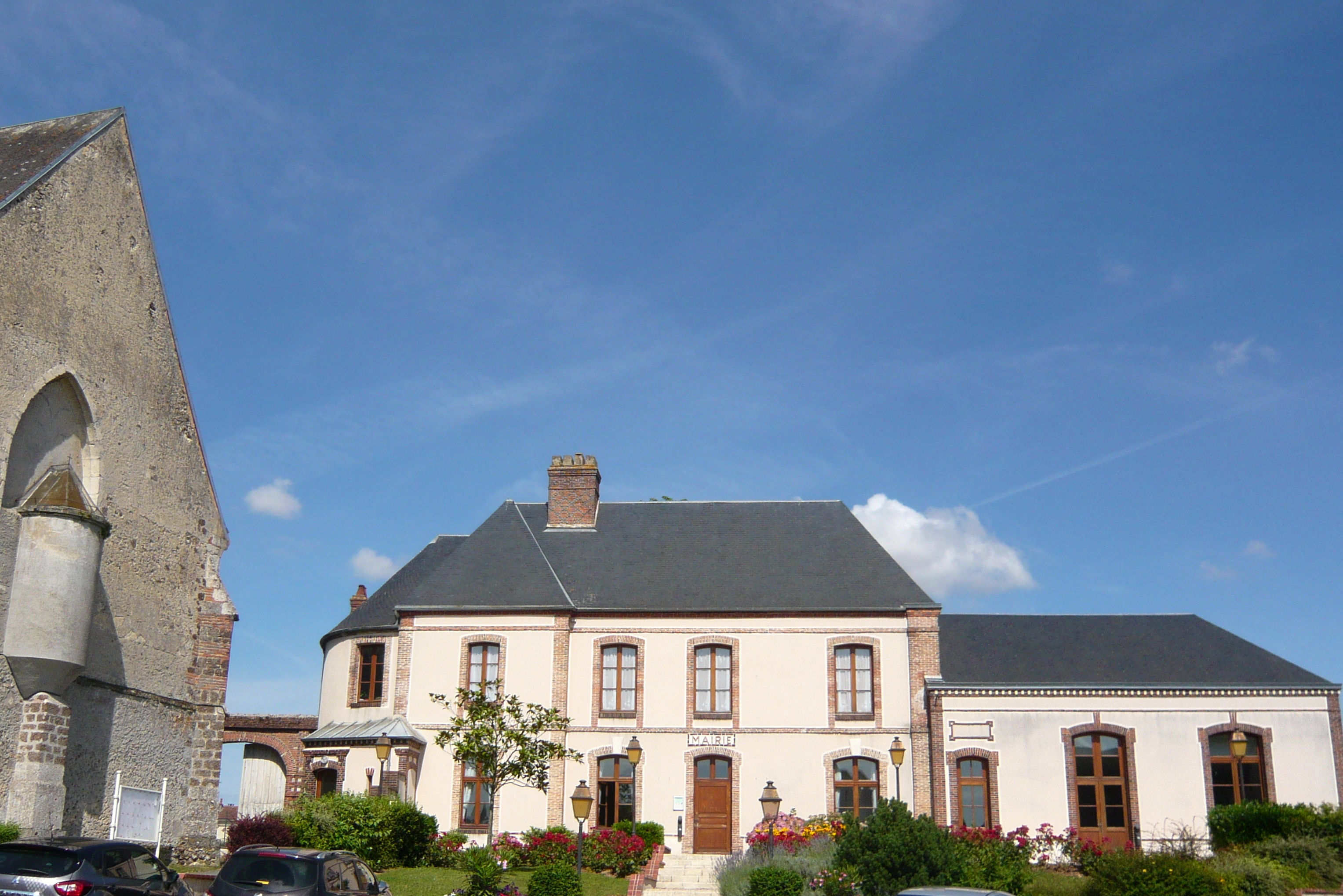
- The town hall in Digny
- Location of Digny
- Location within France Location within Centre-Val de Loire
- Coordinates: 48°32′13″N 1°09′14″E
- Country: France
- Region: Centre-Val de Loire
- Department: Eure-et-Loir
- Arrondissement: Dreux
- Canton: Saint-Lubin-des-Joncherets

Government
  - Mayor (2020–2026): Christelle Lorin
- Area^{1}: 39.99 km^{2} (15.44 sq mi)
- Elevation: 204 m (669 ft)
- Highest elevation: 276 m (906 ft)
- Lowest elevation: 184 m (604 ft)
- Population (2023): 1,003
  - Density: 25.08/km^{2} (64.96/sq mi)
- Time zone: UTC+01:00 (CET)
  - Summer (DST): UTC+02:00 (CEST)
- INSEE/Postal code: 28130 /28250
- ^{1} French Land Register data, which excludes lakes, ponds, glaciers > 1 km^{2} (0.386 sq mi or 247 acres) and river estuaries.

Digny (French pronunciation: [diɲi]) is a commune in the Eure-et-Loir department in northern France.

== Geography ==
The Commune along with another 70 communes shares part of a 47,681 hectare, Natura 2000 conservation area, called the Forêts et étangs du Perche.

== Population ==
Historical population
Year	Pop.	±% p.a.
1968	794	—
1975	771	−0.42%
1982	789	+0.33%
1990	803	+0.22%
1999	842	+0.53%
2007	954	+1.57%
2012	986	+0.66%
2017	979	−0.14%
2023	1,003	+0.40%
Source: INSEE

== See also ==
- Communes of the Eure-et-Loir department
- Perche
