= Châteaudun =

- Subprefecture and commune
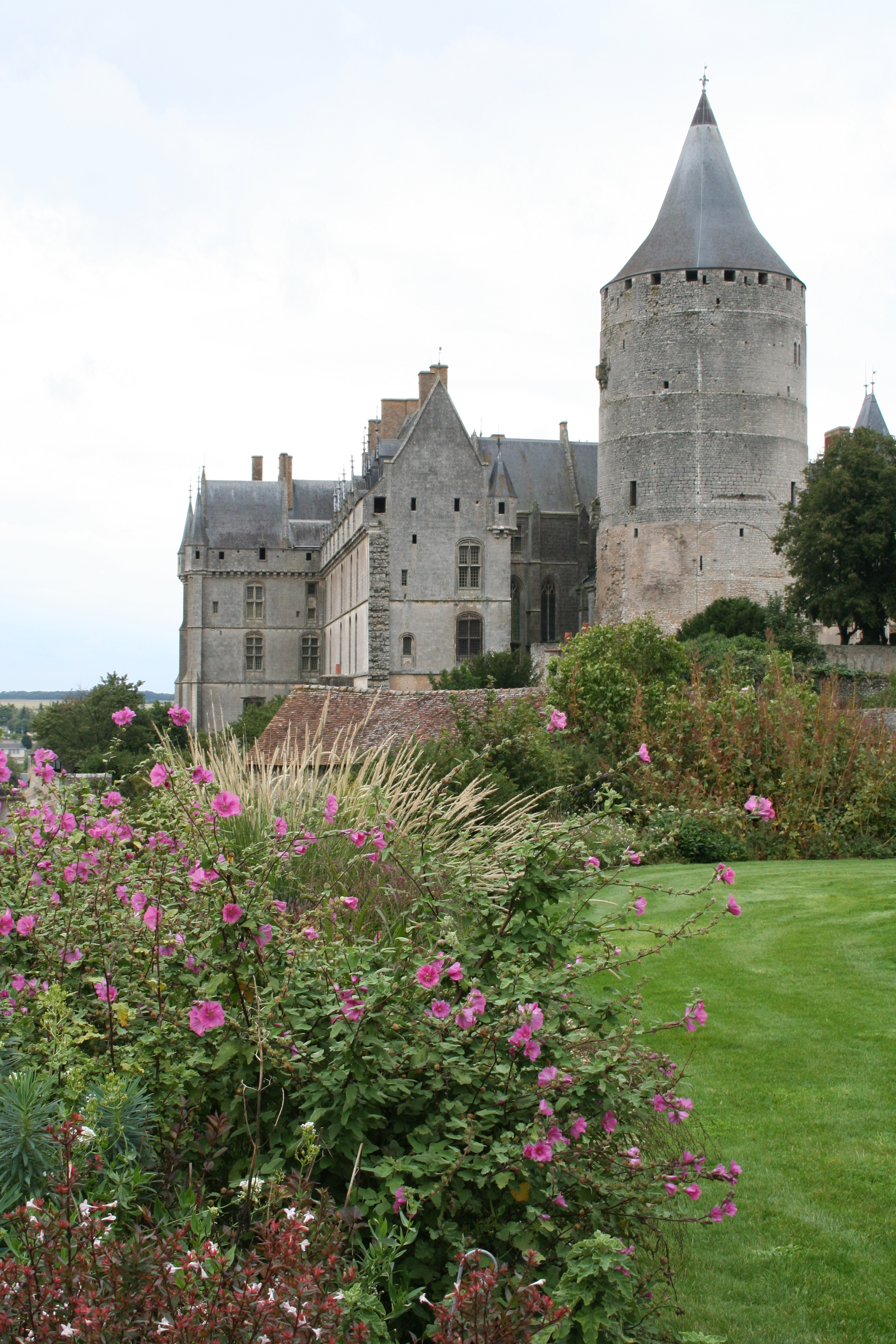
- Chateau

- Coat of arms
- Location of Châteaudun
- Location within France Location within Centre-Val de Loire
- Coordinates: 48°04′18″N 1°20′19″E
- Country: France
- Region: Centre-Val de Loire
- Department: Eure-et-Loir
- Arrondissement: Châteaudun
- Canton: Châteaudun

Government
  - Mayor (2020–2026): Fabien Verdier
- Area^{1}: 28.48 km^{2} (11.00 sq mi)
- Elevation: 140 m (460 ft)
- Highest elevation: 152 m (499 ft)
- Lowest elevation: 102 m (335 ft)
- Population (2023): 12,830
  - Density: 450.5/km^{2} (1,167/sq mi)
- Time zone: UTC+01:00 (CET)
  - Summer (DST): UTC+02:00 (CEST)
- INSEE/Postal code: 28088 /28200
- ^{1} French Land Register data, which excludes lakes, ponds, glaciers > 1 km^{2} (0.386 sq mi or 247 acres) and river estuaries.

Châteaudun (French pronunciation: [ʃɑtodœ̃]) is a commune in the Eure-et-Loir department in northern France. It is a sub-prefecture of the department. It was the site of the Battle of Châteaudun during the Franco-Prussian War.

== Geography ==
Châteaudun is located about 45 km northwest of Orléans, and about 50 km south-southwest of Chartres. It lies on the river Loir, a tributary of the Sarthe.

== History ==
France in 1180 when Angevin kings of England held all the red territories and Chateudun lay near its border.

Châteaudun (Latin Castrodunum), which dates from the Gallo-Roman period, was in the middle ages the capital of the County of Dunois.

The streets, which radiate from a central square, have a uniformity due to the reconstruction of the town after fires in 1723 and 1870.

== Employment ==
The area is rich agricultural land, but a major local employer is the Châteaudun Air Base just to the east of the town, and much larger than the town itself.

== Population ==
Historical population

Year	Pop.	±% p.a.
1793	5,957	—
1800	6,046	+0.21%
1806	6,161	+0.31%
1821	6,042	−0.13%
1831	6,461	+0.67%
1836	6,776	+0.96%
1841	6,580	−0.59%
1846	6,788	+0.62%
1851	6,745	−0.13%
1856	6,542	−0.61%
1861	6,719	+0.54%
1866	6,781	+0.18%
1872	6,552	−0.57%
1876	6,694	+0.54%
1881	7,036	+1.00%
1886	7,284	+0.70%
1891	7,147	−0.38%
1896	7,460	+0.86%
1901	7,146	−0.86%

Year	Pop.	±% p.a.
1906	7,147	+0.00%
1911	7,296	+0.41%
1921	6,587	−1.02%
1926	6,558	−0.09%
1931	6,790	+0.70%
1936	7,057	+0.77%
1946	8,145	+1.44%
1954	9,687	+2.19%
1962	11,982	+2.69%
1968	14,450	+3.17%
1975	15,338	+0.86%
1982	15,319	−0.02%
1990	14,511	−0.68%
1999	14,543	+0.02%
2007	13,963	−0.51%
2012	13,039	−1.36%
2017	13,195	+0.24%
2023	12,830	−0.47%

Source: EHESS and INSEE (1968-2023)

== Main sights ==
The town has a château, founded in the 10th century, known for being the first on the road to Loire Valley from Paris. Châteaundun also has a museum, the "Musée des beaux arts et d'histoire naturelle". The museum is diverse, the most popular exhibition being the big collection of stuffed birds. In addition, there are often temporary exhibitions, recent examples including the war of Asia, ancient Egypt and insects.

=== Churches ===
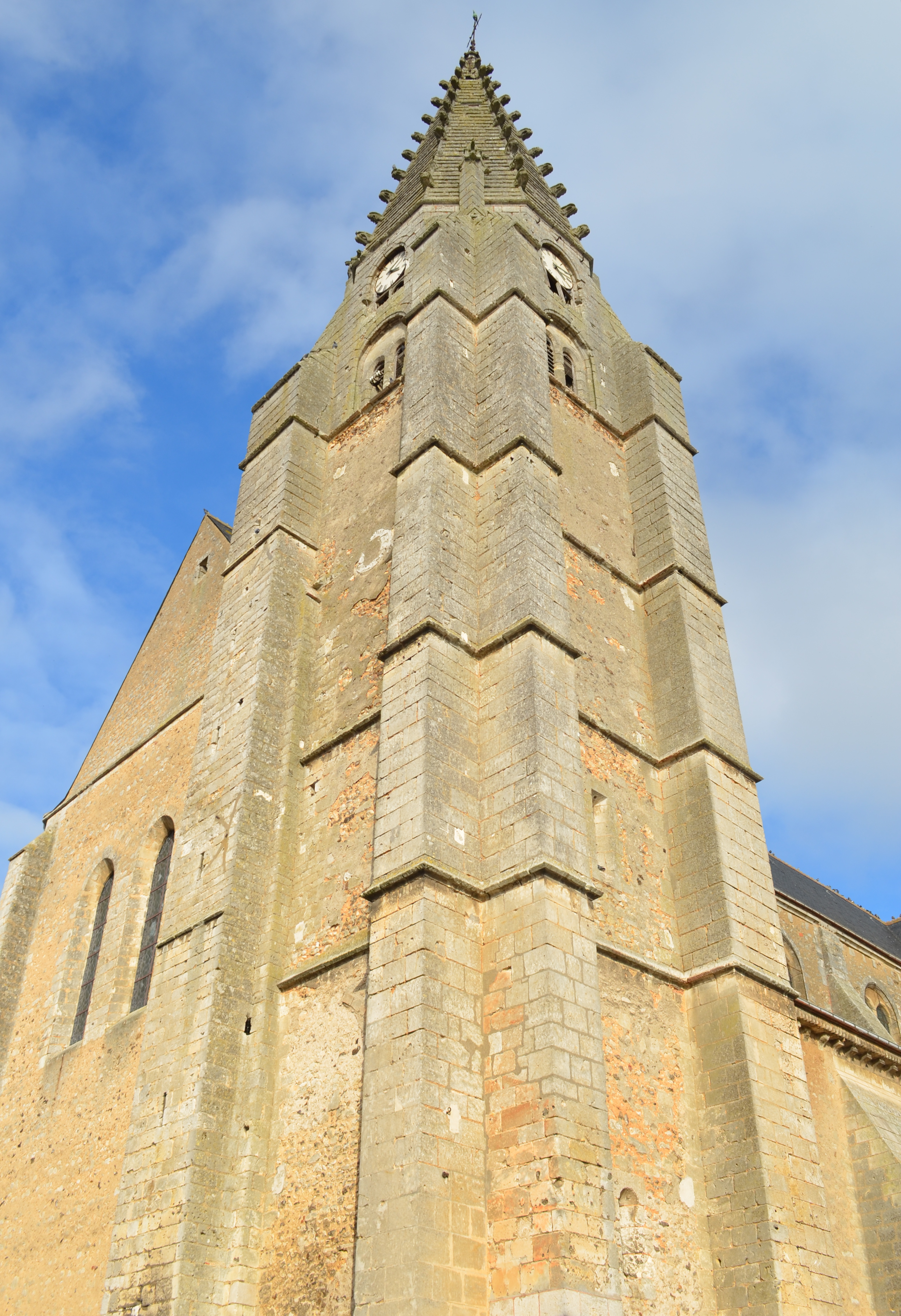
Saint-Valérien

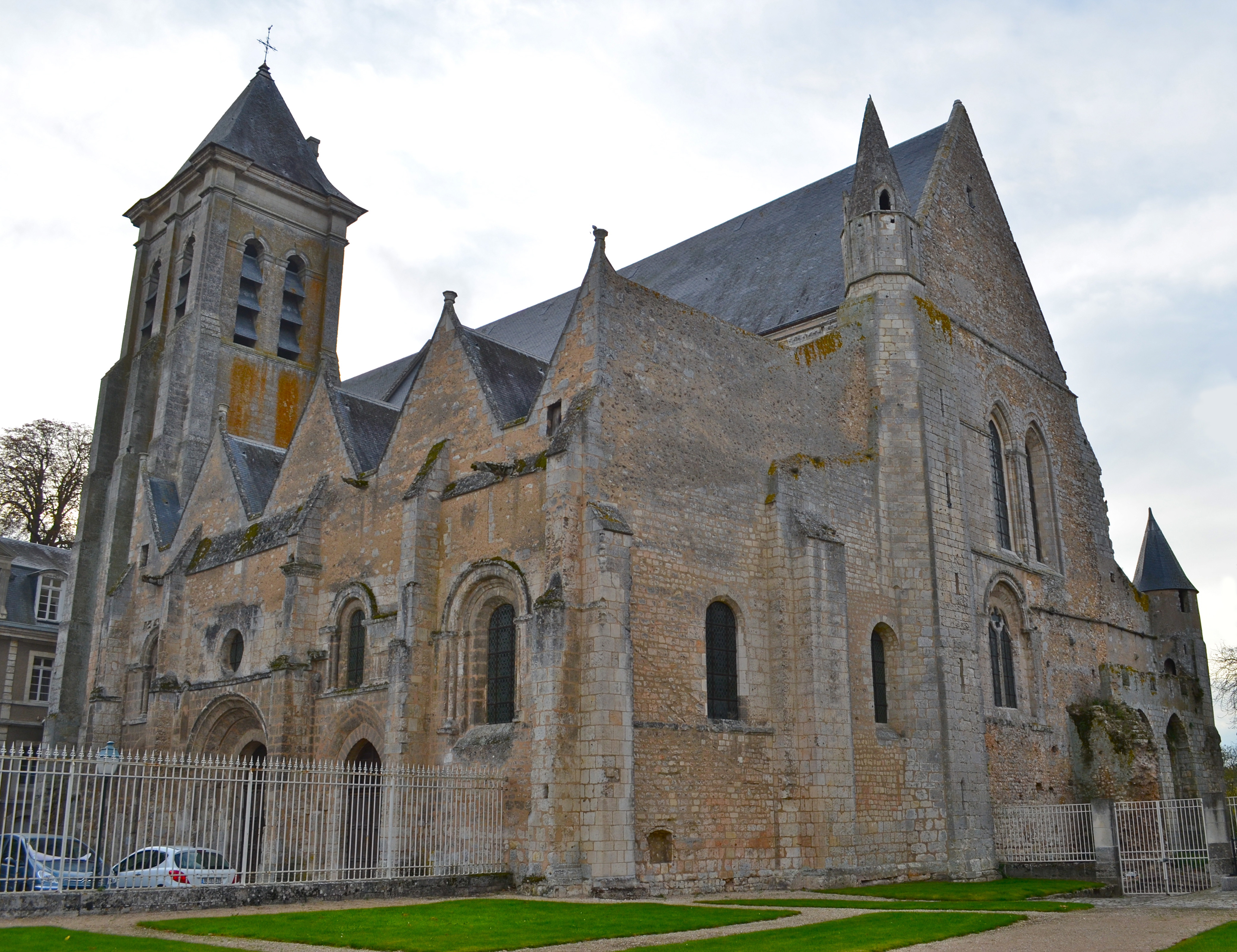
La Madeleine

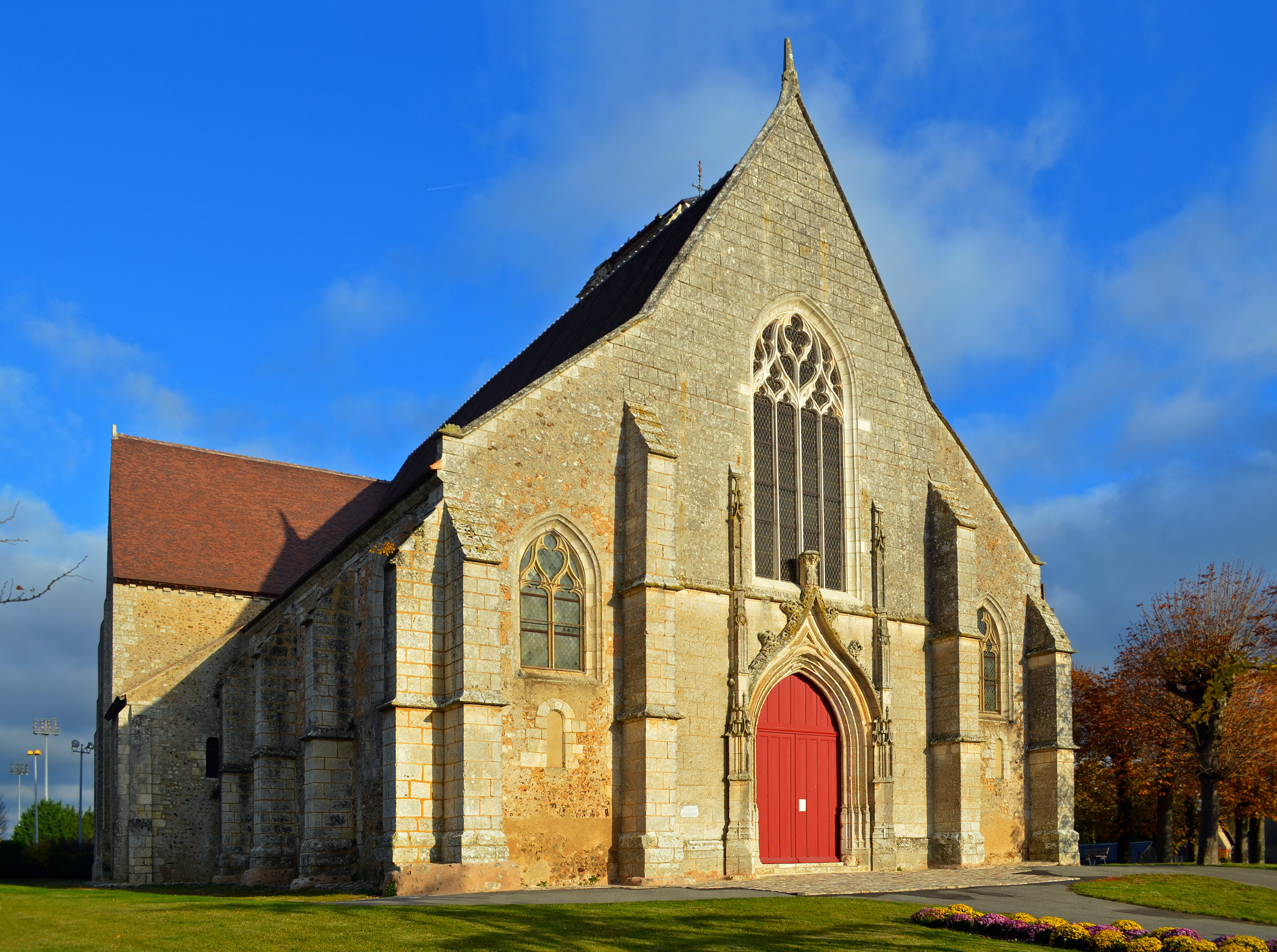
Saint-Jean-de-la-Chaîne

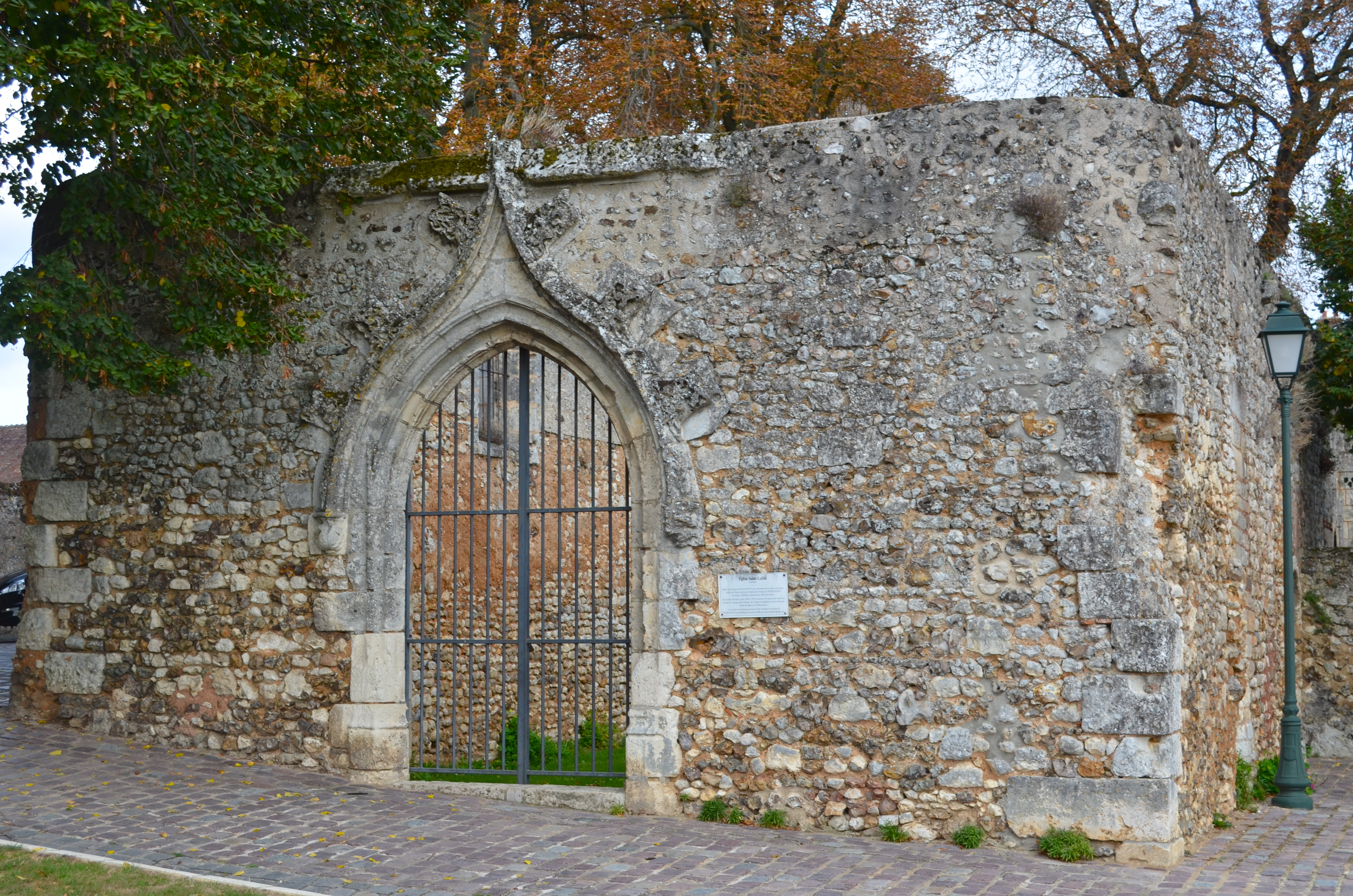
Saint-Lubin ruins

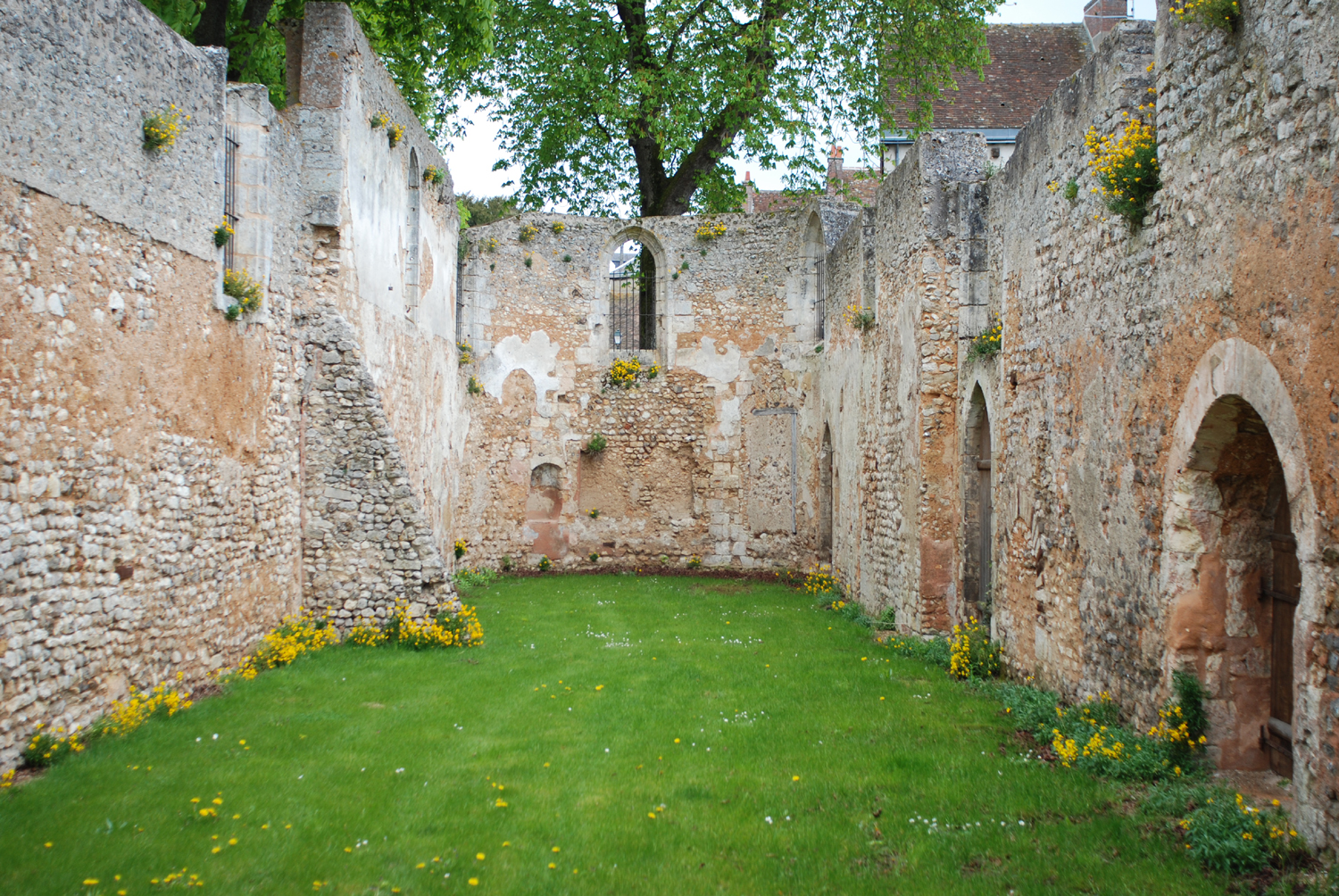
Saint-Lubin ruins

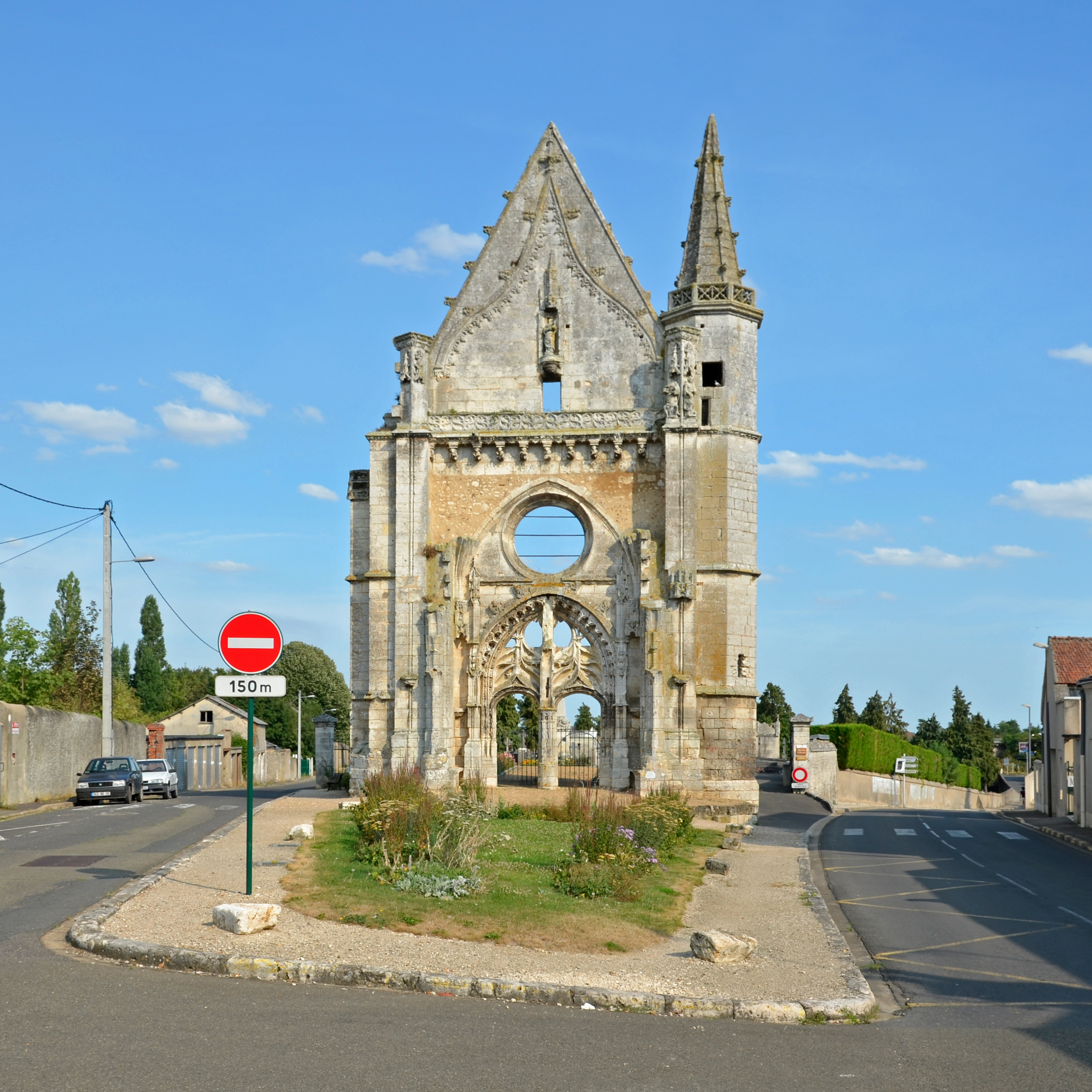
Notre-Dame-du-Champdé chapel (now cemetery entrance)

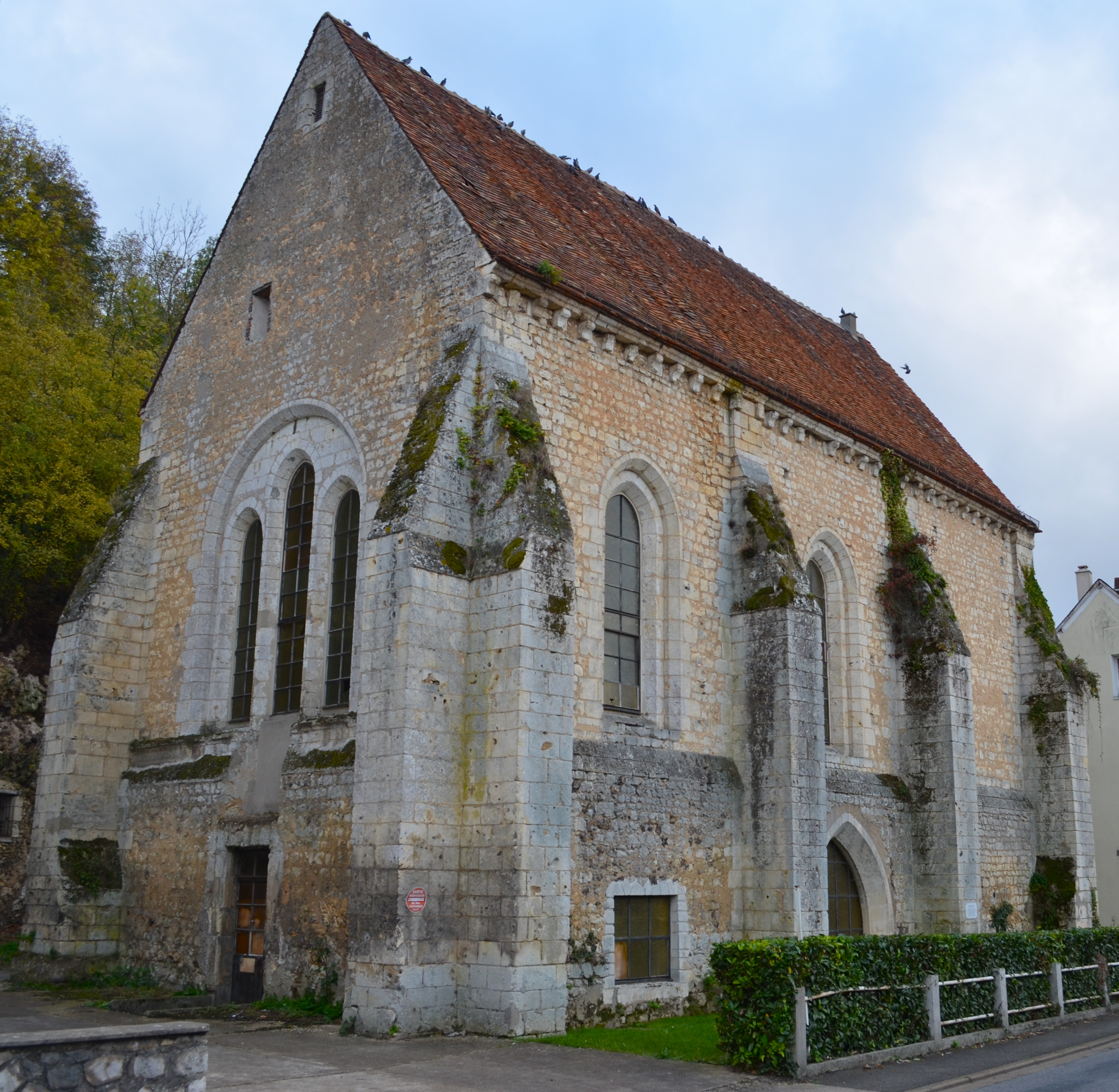
La Boissière chapel

=== Medieval houses ===
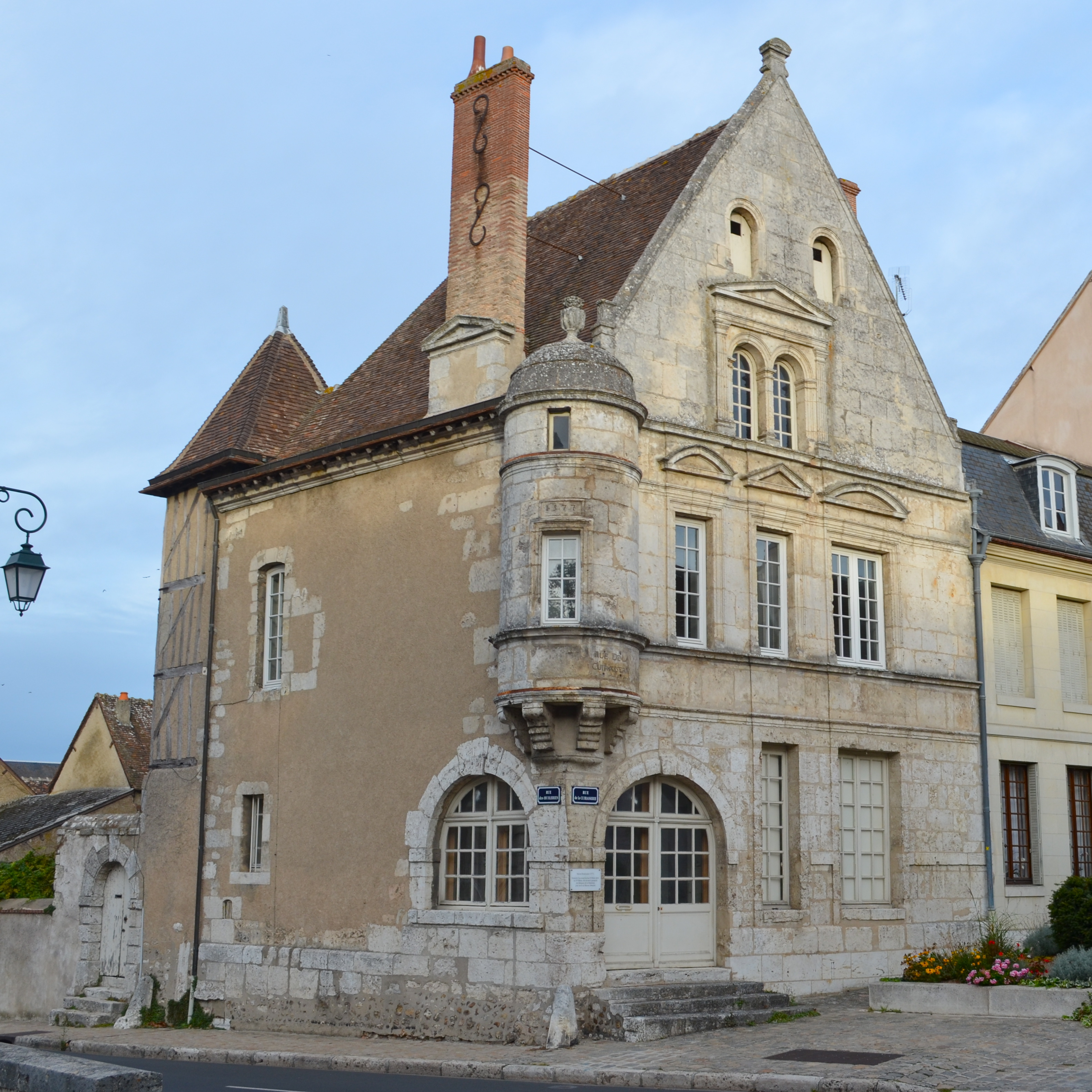
Cuirasserie street and Huileries street angle

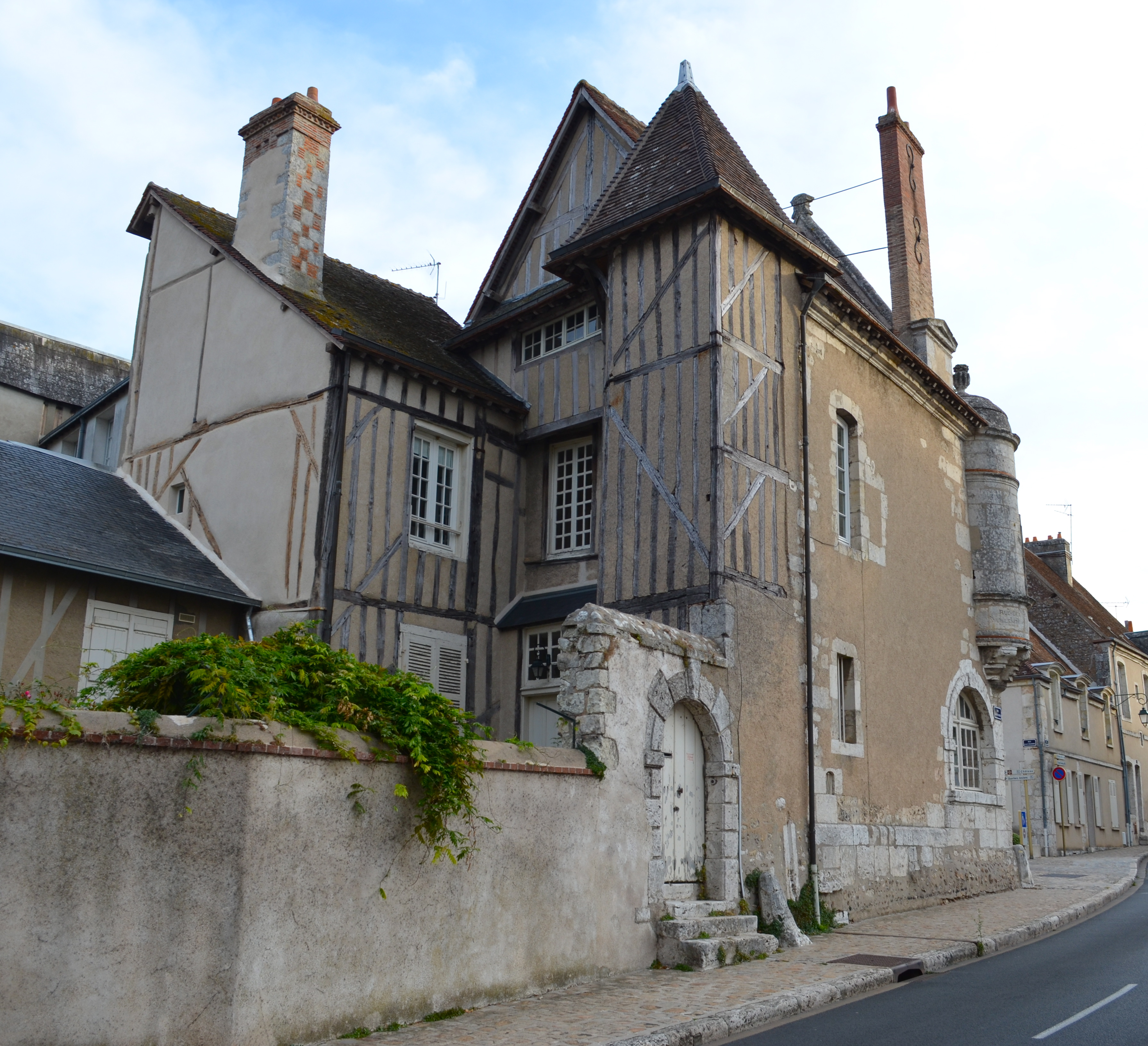
Cuirasserie street and Huileries street angle

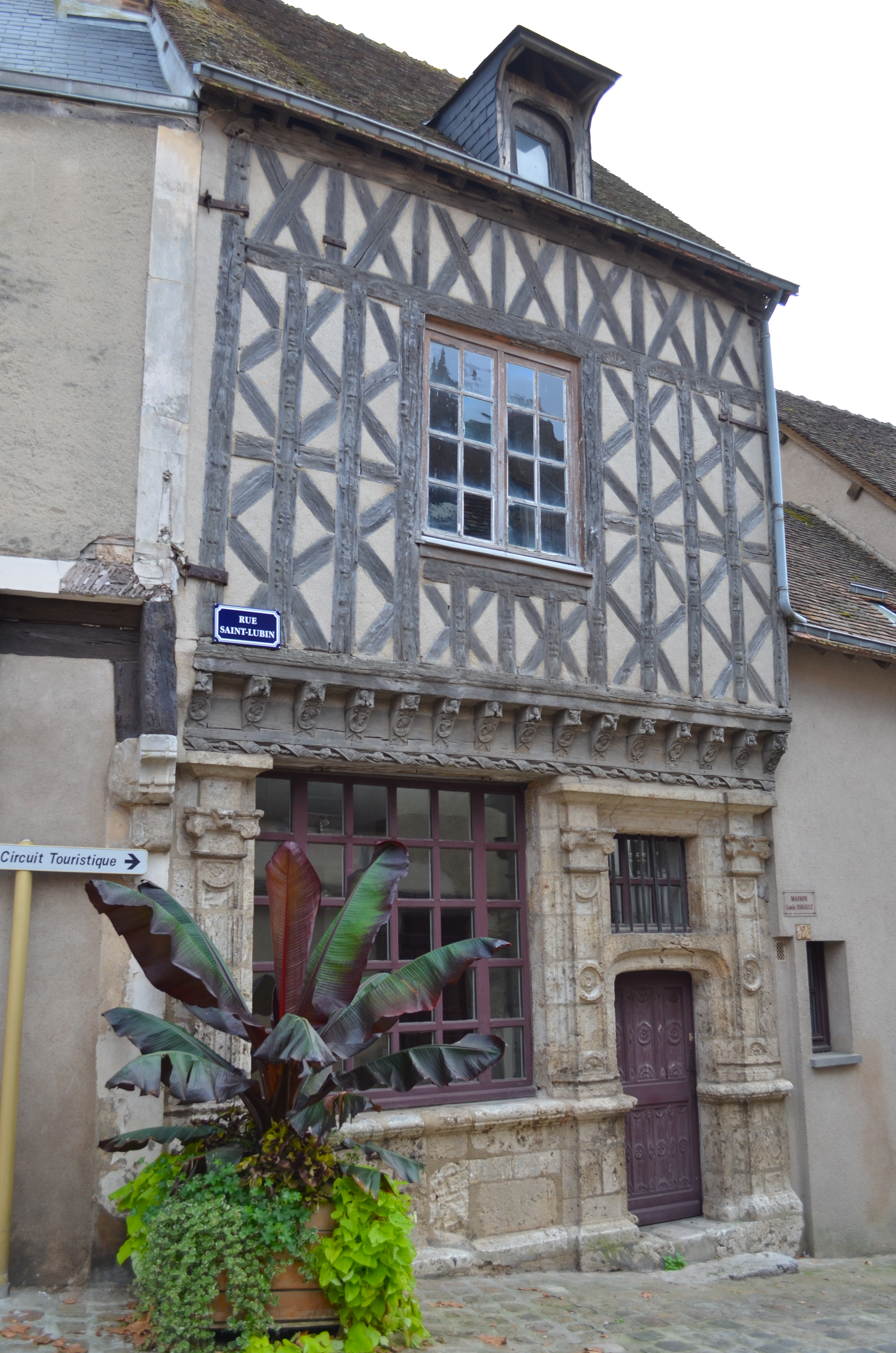
Louis Esnault house

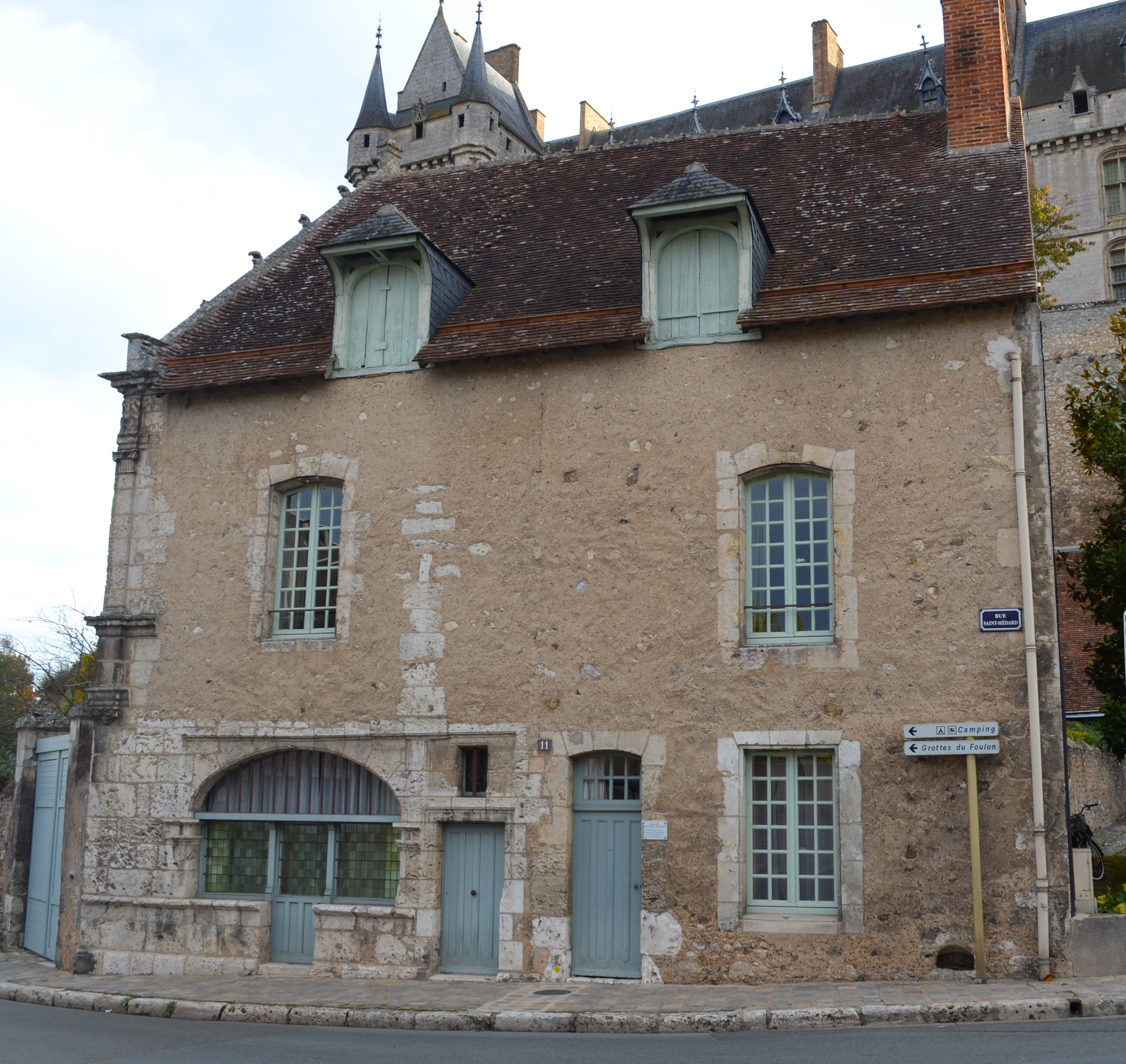
Château's architects' house

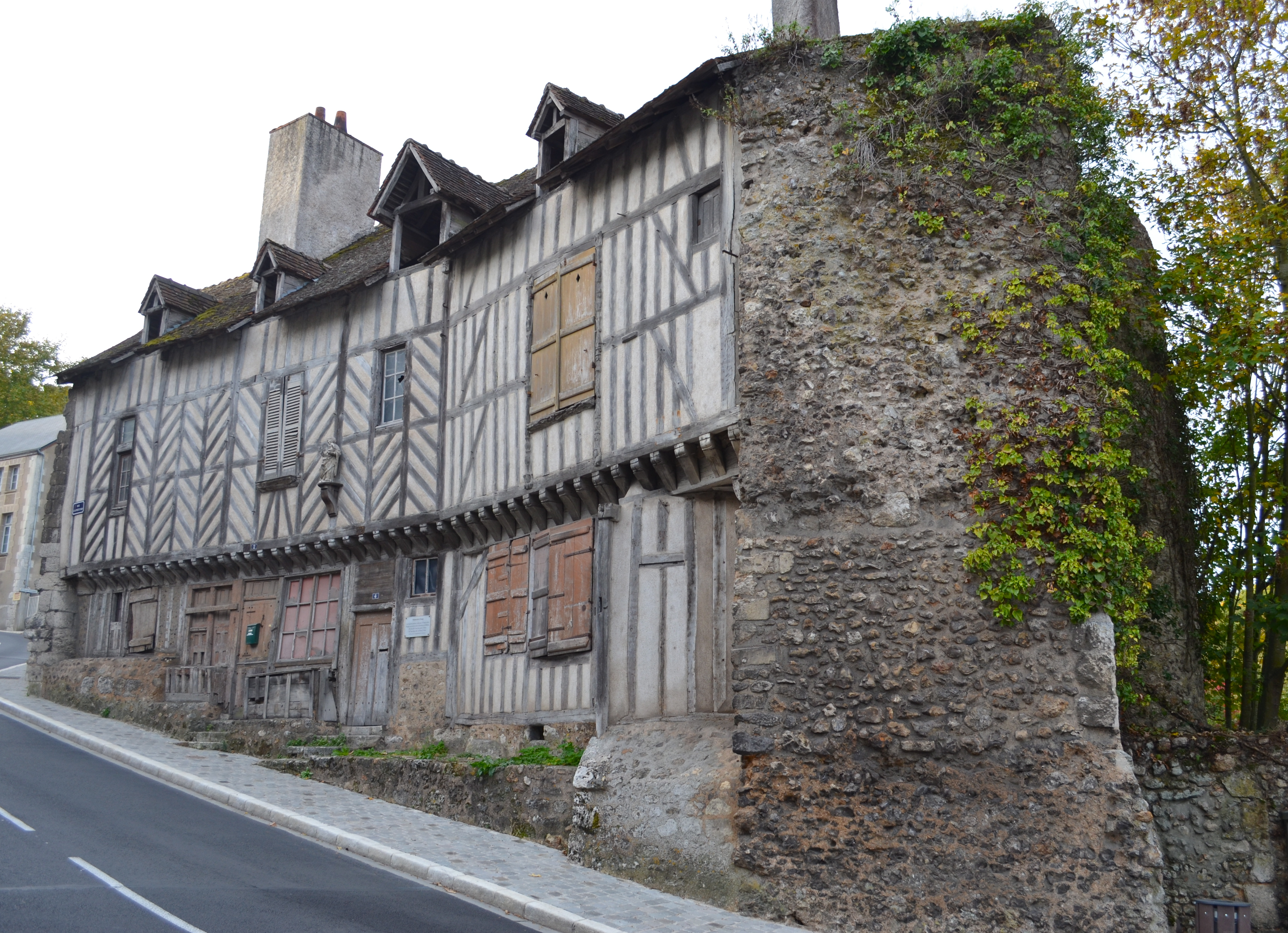
Virgin's house

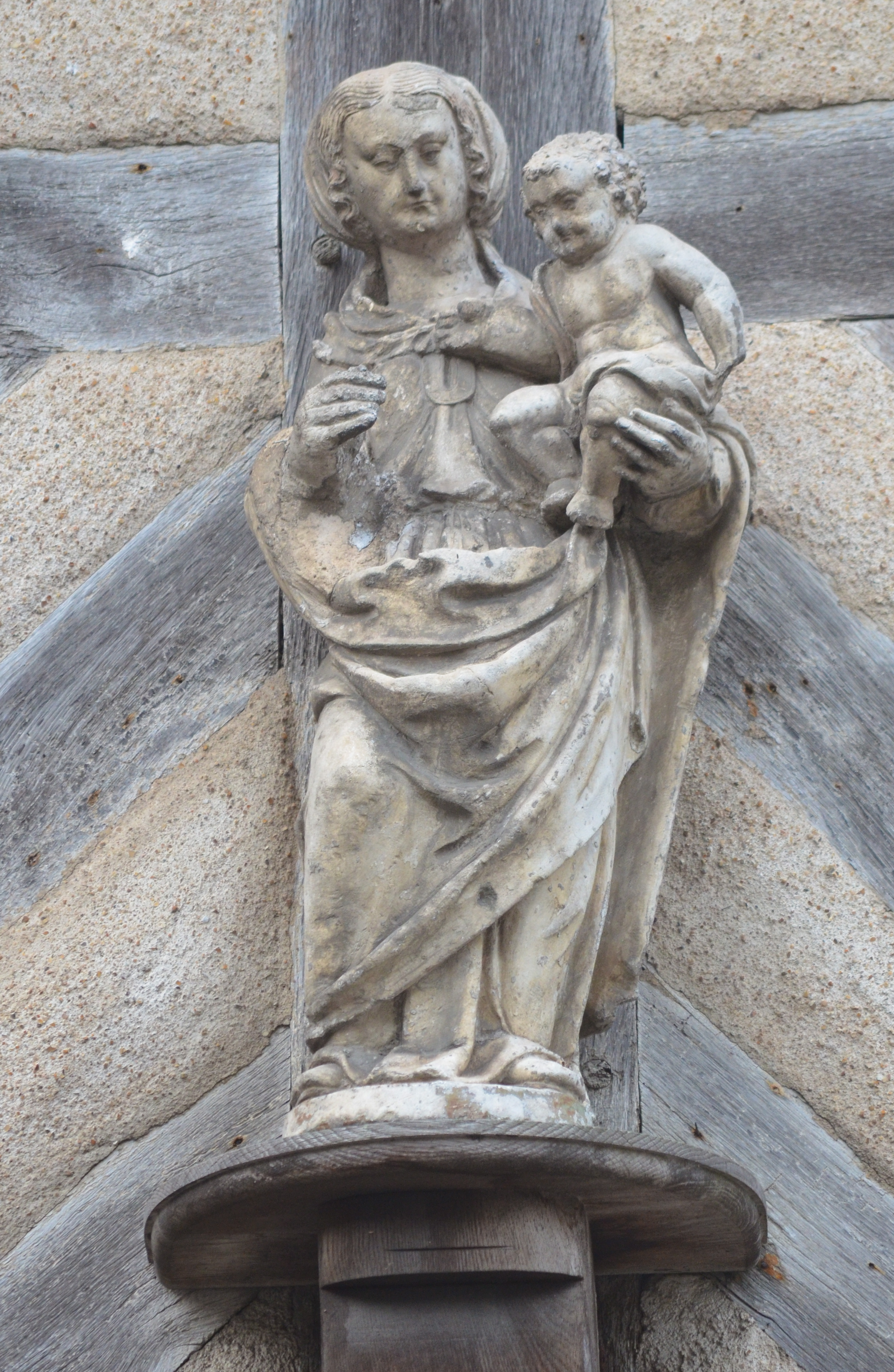
Virgin's house (detail)

== Personalities ==
Châteaudun was the birthplace of:

- Pierre Guédron (1570–1620), composer
- Nicolas Chaperon (1612–1656) painter
- Edmond Modeste Lescarbault (1814), doctor and amateur astronomer
- Romain Feillu (1984) road racing cyclist
- Brice Feillu (1985) road racing cyclist

== Twin towns – sister cities ==
Châteaudun is twinned with:

- (Republic of Ireland) Arklow, Ireland
- Kroměříž, Czech Republic
- Marchena, Spain
- Schweinfurt, Germany
- Trois-Rivières, Canada

== Gallery ==
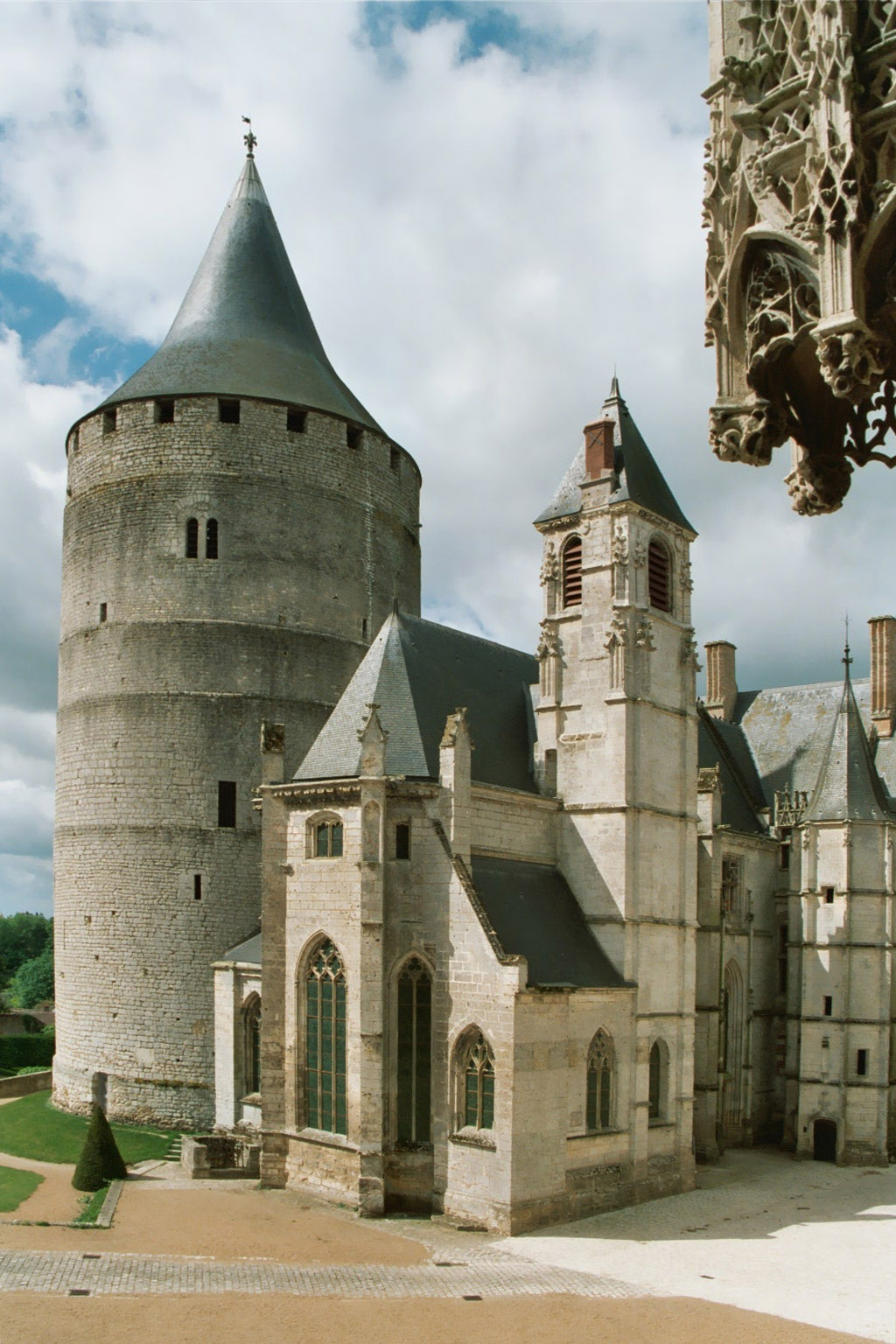
Châteaudun (Eure-et-Loir) Donjon and chapel of the château

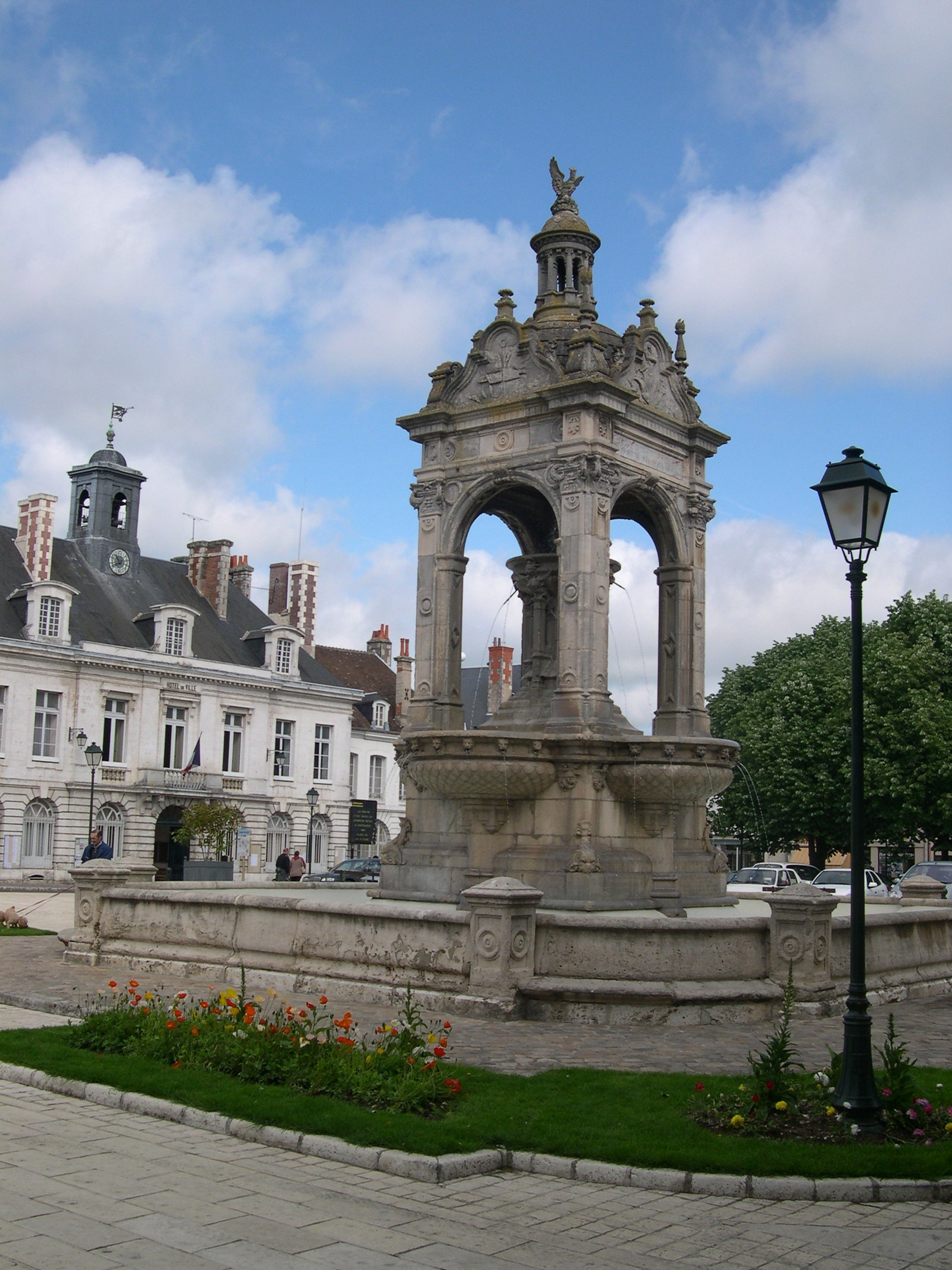
Fountain and façade of the town hall of Châteaudun

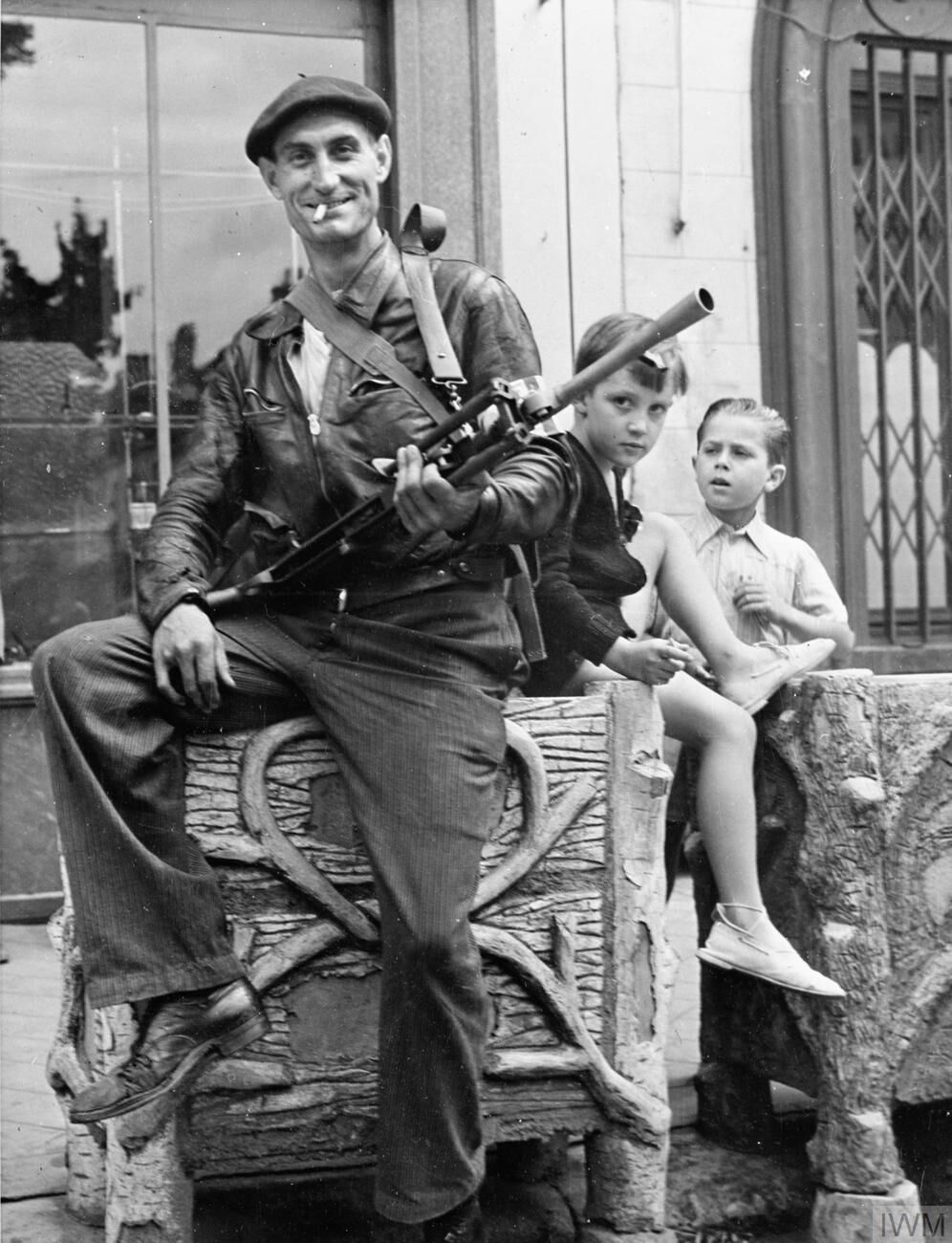
A member of the FFI poses with his Bren gun at Châteaudun - 1944

== Climate ==
Climate data for Châteaudun (1991–2020 normals, extremes 1952–present)
Month	Jan	Feb	Mar	Apr	May	Jun	Jul	Aug	Sep	Oct	Nov	Dec	Year
Record high °C (°F)	15.7 (60.3)	21.0 (69.8)	25.4 (77.7)	28.0 (82.4)	32.1 (89.8)	37.8 (100.0)	41.7 (107.1)	39.3 (102.7)	35.2 (95.4)	29.9 (85.8)	21.7 (71.1)	17.1 (62.8)	41.7 (107.1)
Mean daily maximum °C (°F)	7.1 (44.8)	8.6 (47.5)	12.6 (54.7)	15.9 (60.6)	19.4 (66.9)	23.0 (73.4)	25.8 (78.4)	25.8 (78.4)	21.8 (71.2)	16.6 (61.9)	10.9 (51.6)	7.6 (45.7)	16.3 (61.3)
Daily mean °C (°F)	4.3 (39.7)	4.8 (40.6)	7.8 (46.0)	10.4 (50.7)	13.9 (57.0)	17.3 (63.1)	19.6 (67.3)	19.6 (67.3)	16.0 (60.8)	12.1 (53.8)	7.5 (45.5)	4.7 (40.5)	11.5 (52.7)
Mean daily minimum °C (°F)	1.4 (34.5)	1.0 (33.8)	3.0 (37.4)	4.8 (40.6)	8.4 (47.1)	11.6 (52.9)	13.4 (56.1)	13.3 (55.9)	10.2 (50.4)	7.6 (45.7)	4.1 (39.4)	1.8 (35.2)	6.7 (44.1)
Record low °C (°F)	−18.8 (−1.8)	−17.2 (1.0)	−11.8 (10.8)	−6.3 (20.7)	−2.3 (27.9)	1.2 (34.2)	4.2 (39.6)	3.6 (38.5)	0.7 (33.3)	−4.6 (23.7)	−13.4 (7.9)	−16.3 (2.7)	−18.8 (−1.8)
Average precipitation mm (inches)	51.5 (2.03)	41.3 (1.63)	44.2 (1.74)	46.9 (1.85)	56.1 (2.21)	48.2 (1.90)	51.9 (2.04)	42.9 (1.69)	42.7 (1.68)	61.0 (2.40)	55.1 (2.17)	61.5 (2.42)	603.3 (23.75)
Average precipitation days (≥ 1.0 mm)	10.5	9.3	8.9	9.0	9.1	8.1	7.2	7.0	7.2	10.2	10.4	11.3	108.2
Mean monthly sunshine hours	64.8	91.9	144.2	188.7	215.6	226.4	237.7	233.0	186.6	121.1	72.7	63.0	1,845.7
Source: Meteociel

== See also ==
- Communes of the Eure-et-Loir department
