= Canton of Cloyes-sur-le-Loir =

Coordinates: 48°01′51″N 1°14′18″E

Cloyes-sur-le-Loir
- Former canton
- Interactive map of Cloyes-sur-le-Loir
- Country: France
- Region: Centre-Val de Loire
- Department: Eure-et-Loir
- No. of communes: {{{nbcomm}}}
- Disbanded: 2015
- Area: 264.49 km^{2} (102.12 sq mi)
- Population (2012): 9,693
  - Density: 36.65/km^{2} (94.92/sq mi)

The Canton of Cloyes-sur-le-Loir is a French former canton, located in the arrondissement of Châteaudun, in the Eure-et-Loir département (Centre région). It had 9,693 inhabitants (2012). It was disbanded following the French canton reorganisation which came into effect in March 2015. It consisted of 15 communes, which joined the canton of Brou in 2015.

== Municipalities ==
The canton comprised the following communes:

- Cloyes-sur-le-Loir (seat)
- Arrou
- Autheuil
- Boisgasson
- Charray
- Châtillon-en-Dunois
- Courtalain
- Douy
- La Ferté-Villeneuil
- Langey
- Le Mée
- Montigny-le-Gannelon
- Romilly-sur-Aigre
- Saint-Hilaire-sur-Yerre
- Saint-Pellerin

== See also ==
- Cantons of the Eure-et-Loir department
