= History of the Palace of Westminster =

The history of the Palace of Westminster began in the Middle Ages – in the early eighth century – when there was an Anglo-Saxon church dedicated to St. Peter the Apostle which became known as the West Minster (St. Paul's being the East Minster). In the tenth century the church became a Benedictine abbey and was adopted as a royal church, which subsequently became a royal palace in the 11th century.

Edward the Confessor, the penultimate Anglo-Saxon king, began the building of Westminster Abbey and a neighbouring palace to oversee its construction. After the Norman Conquest of 1066, William the Conqueror adopted the Palace of Westminster as his own. His son, William II (Rufus) laid the foundations of the Great Hall (Westminster Hall).

In 1245 the church was rebuilt (under the reign of Henry III and dedicated to St. Edward (Edward the Confessor).

From as early as 1259, the state openings of parliamentary occasions were held in the King's private apartment at Westminster, the Painted Chamber. The English (and subsequently British) Parliament of the United Kingdom has met at Westminster since the 'Model Parliament' was called by Edward I in 1295.

The Palace burned down in 1834 and was replaced by the modern building.

== Old Palace ==
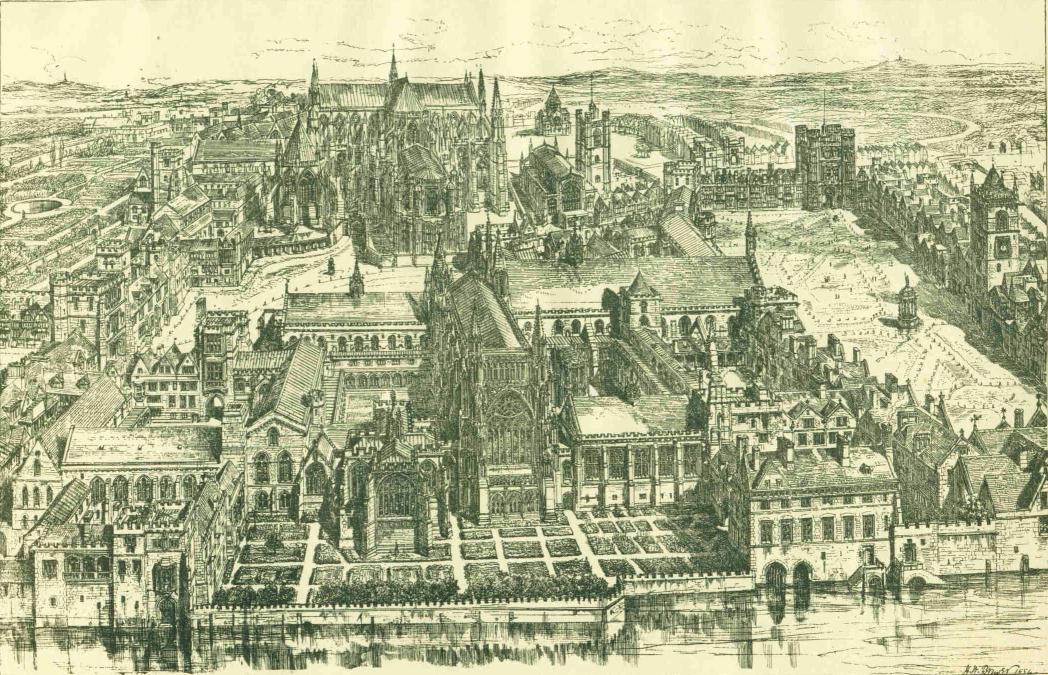
Conjectural restoration of Westminster during the reign of Henry VIII. St Stephen's Chapel in the centre dominates the whole site, with the White Chamber and Painted Chamber on the left and Westminster Hall on the right. Westminster Abbey is in the background.

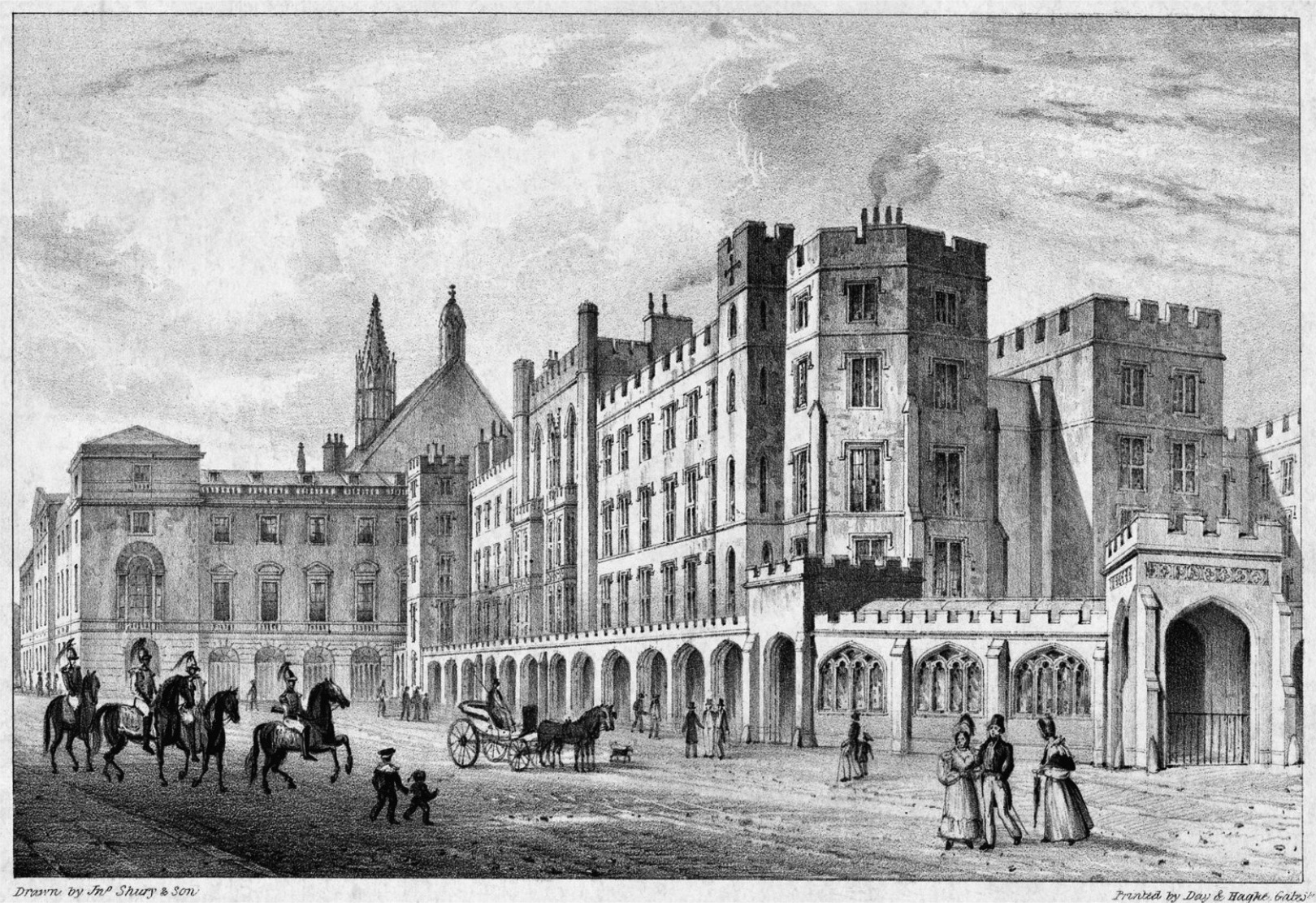
Parliament before the 1834 fire with Old Palace Yard in the foreground. Vardy's Stone Building is on the left, with Soane's law courts and the south gable end of Westminster Hall visible behind. In the centre is Wyatt's "Cotton Mill" frontage of the House of Lords. Soane's ceremonial entrance is on the far-right.

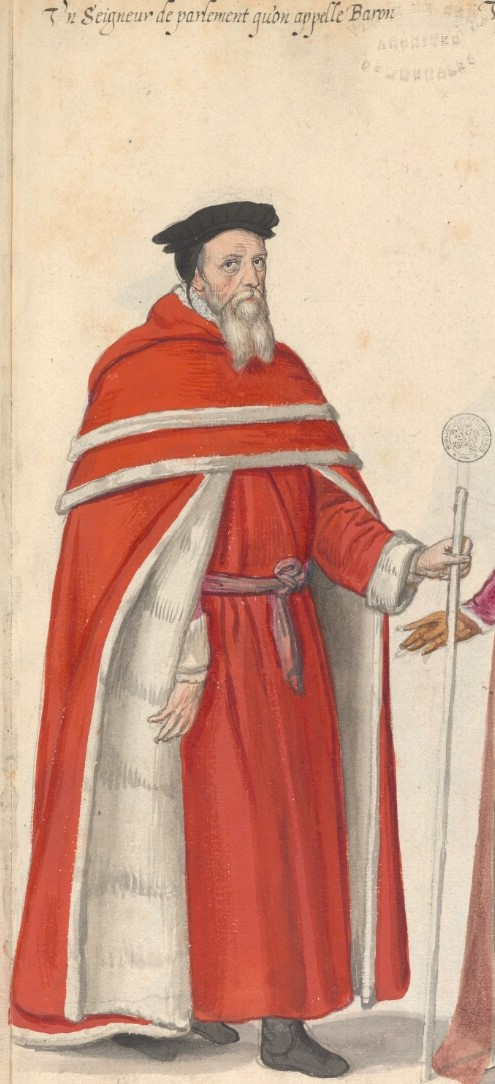
A lord of the Parliament, also called a baron, illustrated in the manuscript "Théâtre de tous les peuples et nations de la terre avec leurs habits et ornemens divers, tant anciens que modernes, diligemment depeints au naturel". Painted by Lucas d'Heere in the 2nd half of the 16th century. Preserverd in the Ghent University Library.

The Palace of Westminster site was strategically important during the Middle Ages, as it was located on the banks of the River Thames. Known in medieval times as Thorney Island, the site may have been first-used for a royal residence by Canute the Great during his reign from 1016 to 1035. St Edward the Confessor, the penultimate Anglo-Saxon monarch of England, built a royal palace on Thorney Island just west of the City of London at about the same time as he built Westminster Abbey (1045–1050). Thorney Island and the surrounding area soon became known as Westminster (a portmanteau of the words West Minster). Neither the buildings used by the Anglo-Saxons nor those used by William I survive. The oldest existing part of the Palace, Westminster Hall, dates from the reign of William I's successor, King William II.

The Palace of Westminster was the monarch's principal residence in the late Medieval period. The predecessor of Parliament, the Curia Regis (Royal Council), met in Westminster Hall (although it followed the King when he moved to other palaces). Simon de Montfort's parliament, the first to include representatives of the major towns, met at the Palace in 1265. The "Model Parliament", the first official Parliament of England, met there in 1295, and almost all subsequent English Parliaments and then, after 1707, all British Parliaments have met at the Palace.

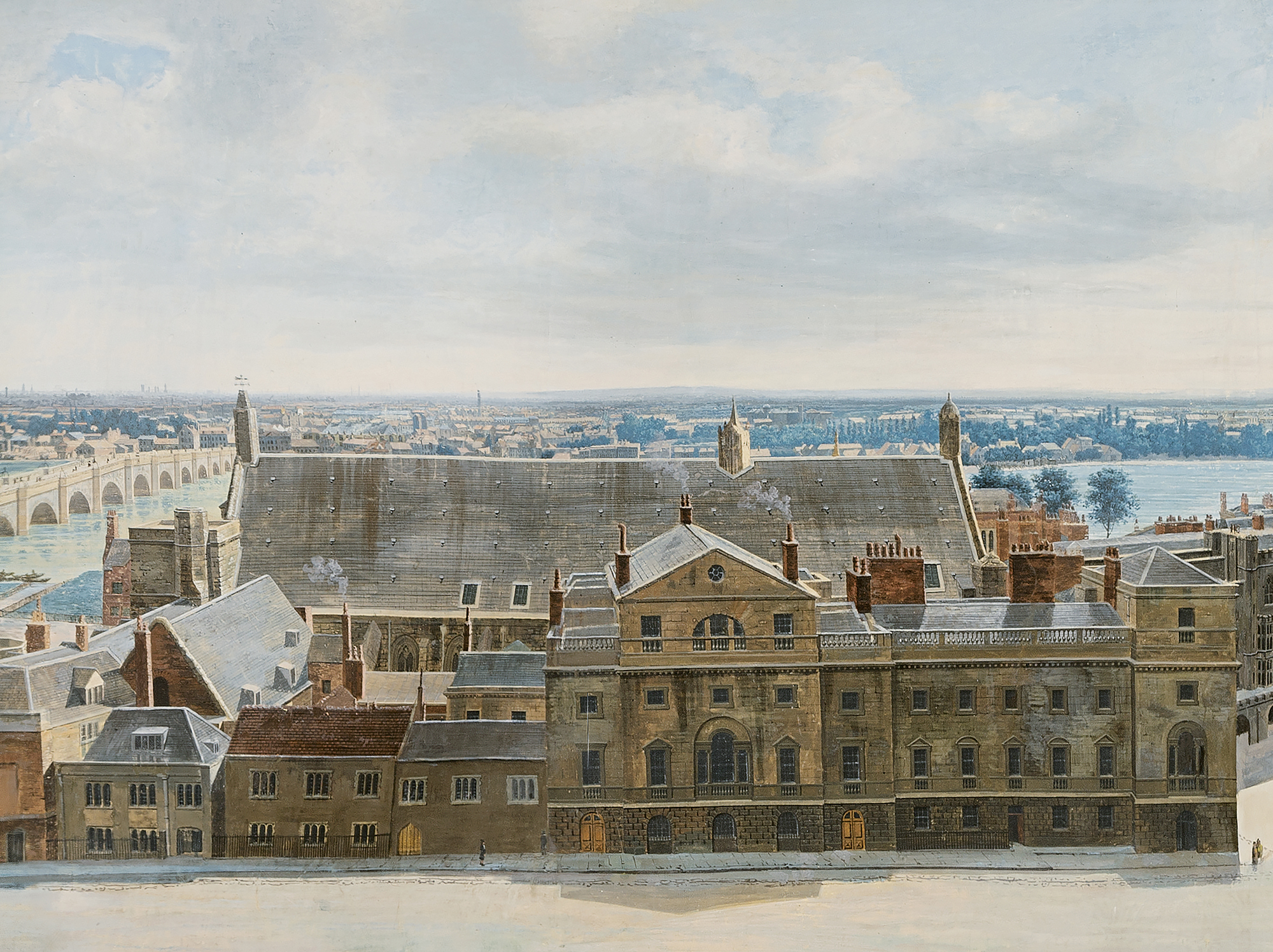
Detail from A Panoramic View of London, from the Tower of St. Margaret's Church, Westminster (1815) by Pierre Prévost, showing the Palace of Westminster. The original Westminster Bridge is at left, and the roof of Westminster Hall at centre.

In 1512, during the early years of the reign of King Henry VIII, fire destroyed the royal residential ("privy") area of the palace. In 1534, Henry VIII acquired York Place from Cardinal Thomas Wolsey, a powerful minister who had lost the King's favour. Renaming it the Palace of Whitehall, Henry used it as his principal residence. Although Westminster officially remained a royal palace, it was used by the two Houses of Parliament and by the various royal law courts.

In February 2020 a secret door was discovered which had been built for the coronation of King Charles II in 1661. The doorway is located in the cloister behind Westminster Hall.

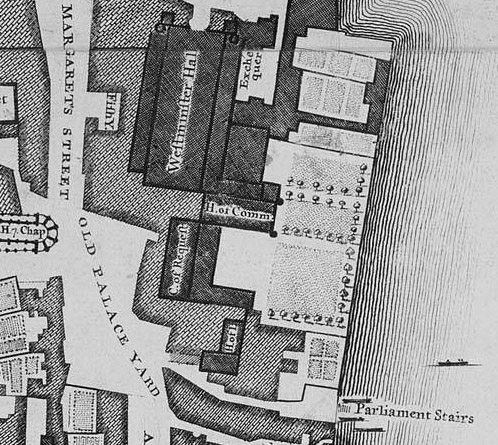
A detail from John Rocque's 1746 map of London. St Stephen's Chapel, labelled "H of Comm" (House of Commons), was adjacent to Westminster Hall; the Parliament Chamber—labelled "H of L" (House of Lords)—and the Prince's Chamber were to the far south. The Court of Requests, between the two Houses, would become the new home of the Lords in 1801. At the north-east, by the river, stood Speaker's House.

Because it was originally a royal residence, the Palace included no purpose-built chambers for the two Houses. Important state ceremonies were held in the Painted Chamber which had been originally built in the 13th century as the main bedchamber for King Henry III. The House of Lords originally met in the Queen's Chamber, a modest Medieval hall towards the southern end of the complex, with the adjoining Prince's Chamber used as the robing room for peers and for the monarch during state openings. In 1801 the Upper House moved into the larger White Chamber (also known as the Lesser Hall), which had housed the Court of Requests; the expansion of the Peerage by King George III during the 18th century, along with the imminent Act of Union with Ireland, necessitated the move, as the original chamber could not accommodate the increased number of peers.

The House of Commons, which did not have a chamber of its own, sometimes held its debates in the Chapter House of Westminster Abbey. The Commons acquired a permanent home at the Palace in St Stephen's Chapel, the former chapel of the royal palace, during the reign of Edward VI. In 1547 the building became available for the Commons' use following the disbanding of St Stephen's College. Alterations were made to St Stephen's Chapel over the following three centuries for the convenience of the lower House, gradually destroying, or covering up, its original mediaeval appearance. A major renovation project undertaken by Christopher Wren in the late 17th century completely redesigned the building's interior.

The Palace of Westminster as a whole began to see significant alterations from the 18th century onwards, as Parliament struggled to carry out its business in the limited available space and ageing buildings. Calls for an entirely new palace went unheeded as instead more buildings of varying quality and style were added. A new west façade, known as the Stone Building, facing onto St Margaret's Street was designed by John Vardy built in the Palladian style between 1755 and 1770, providing more space for document storage and committee rooms. The House of Commons Engrossing Office of Senior Parliamentary Officer, Henry (Robert) Gunnell (1724–1794) and Edward Barwell was on the lower floor beside the corner tower at the west side of Vardy's western façade. A new official residence for the Speaker of the House of Commons was built adjoining St Stephen's Chapel and completed in 1795. The neo-Gothic architect James Wyatt also carried out works on both the House of Lords and Commons between 1799 and 1801, including alterations to the exterior of St Stephen's Chapel and a much-derided new neo-Gothic building, referred to by Wyatt's critics as "The Cotton Mill" adjoining the House of Lords and facing onto Old Palace Yard.

The palace complex was substantially remodelled, this time by John Soane, between 1824 and 1827. The medieval House of Lords chamber, which had been the target of the failed Gunpowder Plot of 1605, was demolished as part of this work in order to create a new Royal Gallery and ceremonial entrance at the southern end of the palace. Soane's work at the palace also included new library facilities for both Houses of Parliament and new law courts for the Chancery and King's Bench. Soane's alterations caused controversy owing to his use of neo-classical architectural styles, which conflicted with the Gothic style of the original buildings.

== Fire and reconstruction ==
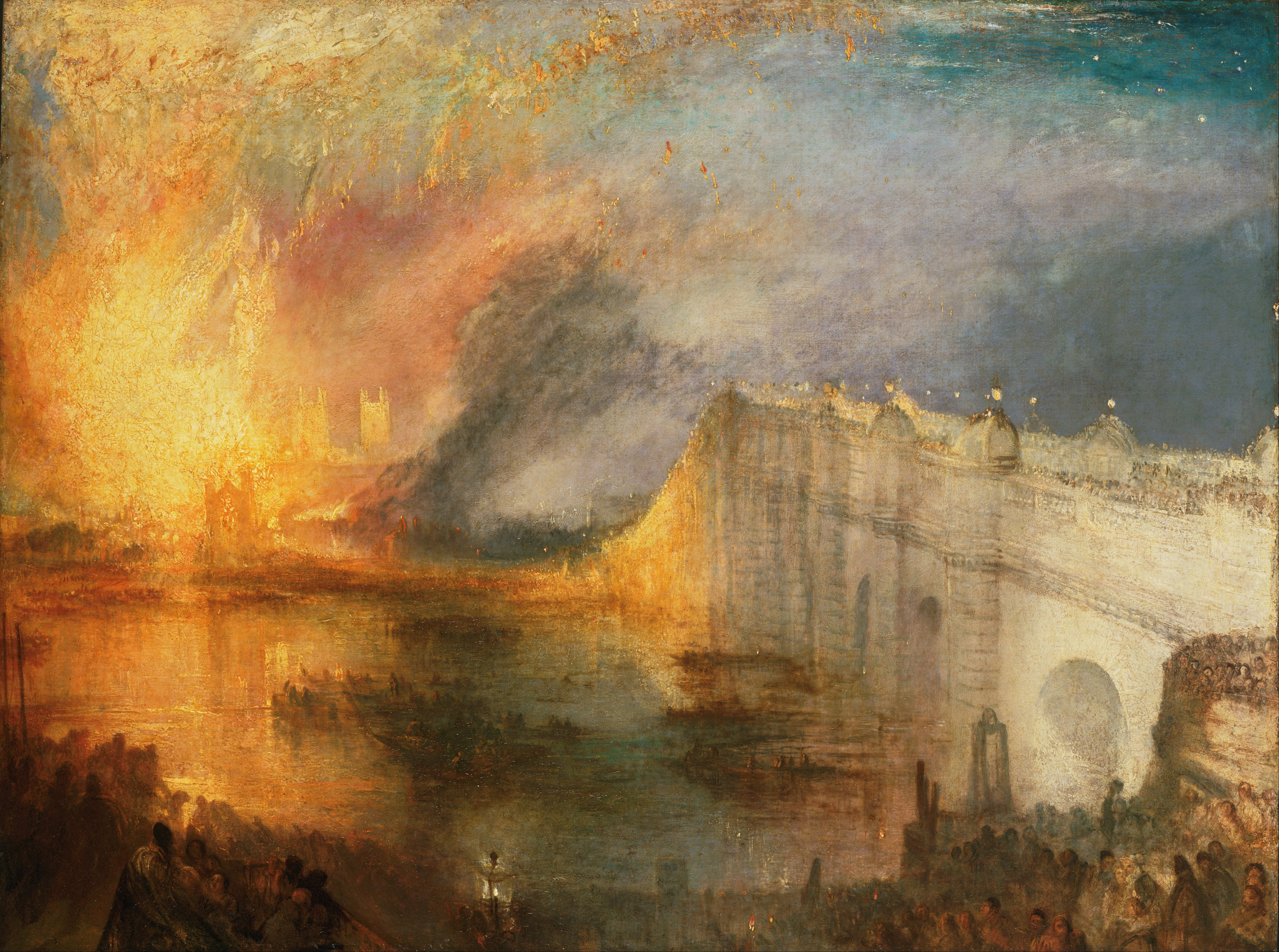
J. M. W. Turner watched the fire of 1834 and painted several canvases depicting it, including The Burning of the Houses of Lords and Commons (1835).

On 16 October 1834, a fire broke out in the Palace after an overheated stove used to destroy the Exchequer's stockpile of tally sticks set fire to the House of Lords Chamber. In the resulting conflagration both Houses of Parliament were destroyed, along with most of the other buildings in the palace complex. Westminster Hall was saved thanks to fire-fighting efforts and a change in the direction of the wind. The Jewel Tower, the Undercroft Chapel and the Cloisters and Chapter House of St Stephen's were the only other parts of the Palace to survive.

Immediately after the fire, King William IV offered the almost-completed Buckingham Palace to Parliament, hoping to dispose of a residence he disliked. The building was considered unsuitable for parliamentary use, however, and the gift was rejected. Proposals to move to Charing Cross or St James's Park had a similar fate; the allure of tradition and the historical and political associations of Westminster proved too strong for relocation, despite the deficiencies of that site. In the meantime, the immediate priority was to provide accommodation for the next Parliament, and so the Painted Chamber and White Chamber were hastily repaired for temporary use by the Houses of Lords and Commons respectively, under the direction of the only remaining architect of the Office of Works, Sir Robert Smirke. Works proceeded quickly and the chambers were ready for use by February 1835.

In his speech opening Parliament in February 1835, following the conclusion of that year's General Election, the King assured the members that the fire was accidental, and permitted Parliament to make "plans for [its] permanent accommodation". Each house created a committee and a public debate over the proposed styles ensued.

== Feud between Neoclassical and Neogothic architects ==
Advocacy of a neoclassical design was popular. Decimus Burton, who was 'the land's leading classicist', created a design for a new neoclassical Houses of Parliament. Decimus Burton and his pupils commended the purchase of the Elgin Marbles for the nation, and the erection of a neoclassical gallery in which they could be displayed to the same, and subsequently contended that the destruction of the Houses of Parliament by the fire of 1834 was an opportunity for the creation of a splendid neoclassical replacement of the Houses of Parliament, in which the Elgin Marbles could be displayed: they expressed their aversion that the new seat of the British Empire would ‘be doomed to crouch and wither in the groinings [sic], vaultings, tracery, pointed roof, and flying buttresses of a Gothic building…’: a building of a style that they contended to be improper ‘to the prevailing sentiment of an age so enlightened’.

In contradistinction to the neo-gothic style, they commended those who had ‘built St. Paul’s Cathedral, to the satisfaction of an applauding posterity, in the more beautiful and universal style of Roman architecture’. However, the Prime Minister, Robert Peel, wanted, now that he were premier, to disassociate himself from the controversial John Wilson Croker, who was a founding member of the Athenaeum, close associate of the Burtons, an advocate of neoclassicism, and repudiator of the neo-gothic style: consequently, Peel appointed a Royal Commission chaired by Edward Cust, who disliked the style of John Nash and William Wilkins, which resolved that the new Houses of Parliament would have to be in either the ‘gothic’ or the ‘Elizabethan’ style.

The committee also included Charles Hanbury-Tracy, Thomas Liddell, the poet Samuel Rogers and the artist George Vivian. Augustus W. N. Pugin, the foremost expert on the Gothic, had to submit each of his designs through, and thus in the name of, other architects, James Gillespie Graham and Charles Barry, because he had recently openly and fervently converted to Roman Catholicism, as a consequence of which any design submitted in his own name would certainly have been automatically rejected; the design he submitted for improvements to Balliol College, Oxford, in 1843 were rejected for this reason. The design for Parliament that Pugin submitted through Barry won the competition. Barry was awarded a prize (or "premium") of £1,500. Premiums of £500 each were given to David Hamilton, J. C. Buckler and William Railton. The Architectural Magazine summarised Barry's winning plan as "a quadrangular pile, with the principal front facing the Thames, and a tower in the centre, 170ft high".

Subsequent to the announcement of the design ascribed to Barry, William Richard Hamilton, who had been secretary to Elgin during the acquisition of the marbles, published a pamphlet in which he censured the fact that ‘gothic barbarism’ had been preferred to the masterful designs of Ancient Greece and Rome: but the judgement was not altered, and was ratified by the Commons and the Lords. The commissioners subsequently appointed Pugin to assist in the construction of the interior of the new Palace, to the design of which Pugin himself had been the foremost determiner. The first stone of the new Pugin-Barry design was laid on 27 April 1840, by Barry's wife Sarah (née Rowsell). During the competition for the design of the new Houses of Parliament, Decimus Burton was vituperated with continuous invective, which Guy Williams has described as an 'anti-Burton campaign', by the foremost advocate of the neo-gothic style, Augustus W. N. Pugin, who was made enviously reproachful that Decimus 'had done much more that Pugin's father (Augustus Charles Pugin) to alter the appearance of London'. Pugin attempted to popularize advocacy of the neo-gothic, and repudiation of the neoclassical, by composing and illustrating books that contended the supremacy of the former and the degeneracy of the latter, which were published from 1835.

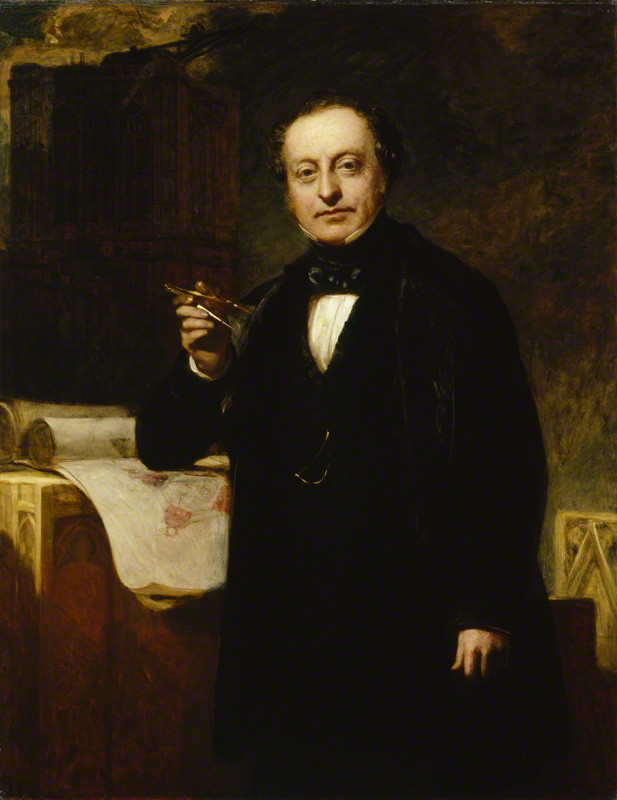
Sir Charles Barry conceived the winning design for the New Houses of Parliament and supervised its construction until his death in 1860. (Portrait by John Prescott Knight)

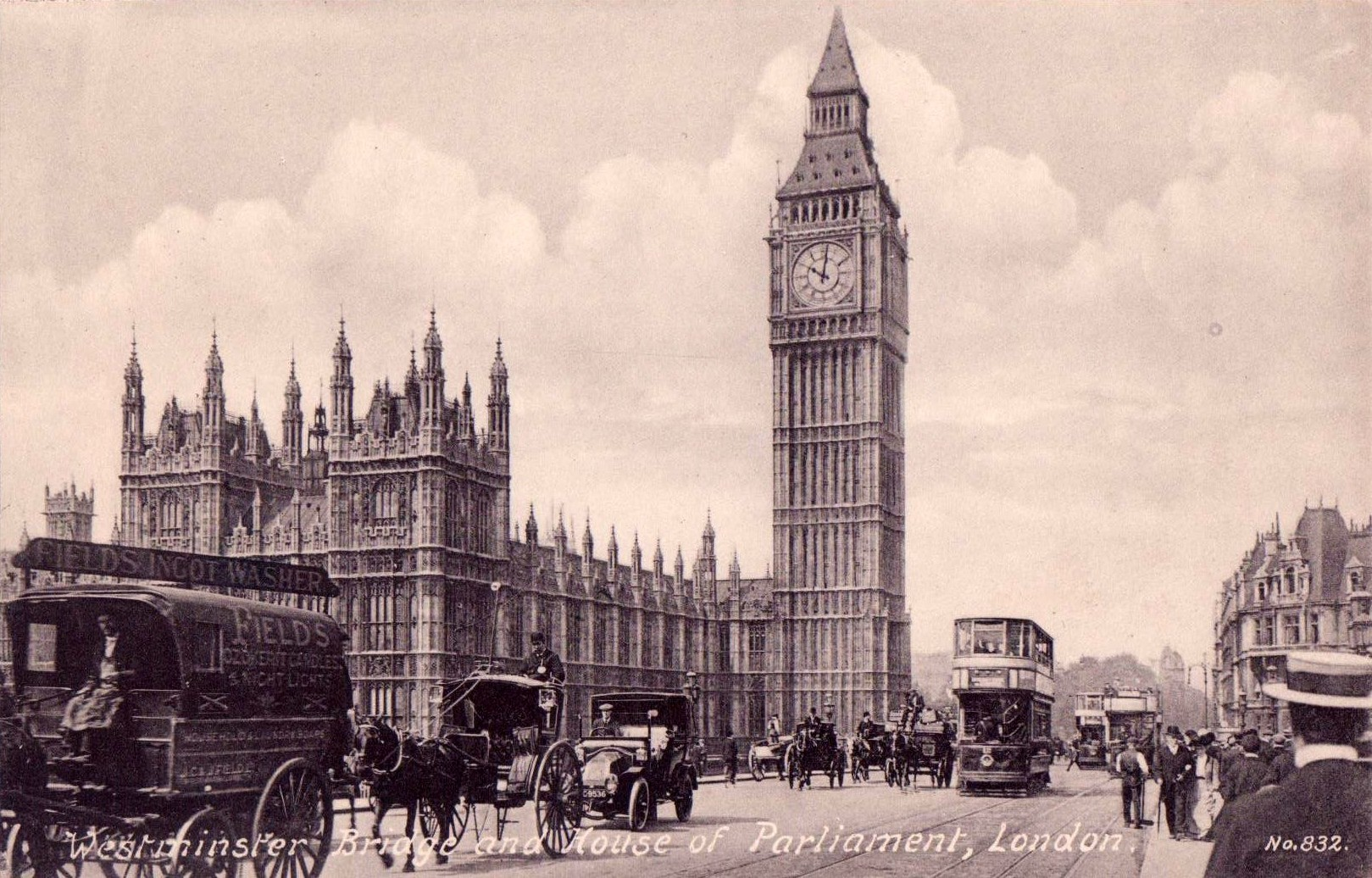
Westminster Bridge and Houses of Parliament, c. 1910

The Lords Chamber was completed in 1847, and the Commons Chamber in 1852 (at which point Barry received a knighthood). Although most of the work had been carried out by 1860 when Charles Barry died, construction was not finished until a decade afterwards, under the supervision of his son Edward Middleton Barry.

=== Frescoes ===
With the building itself taking shape, it was time to think about its internal adornments. In a process overseen by a Royal Fine Art Commission under the presidency of Prince Albert, a Select Committee which included Sir Robert Peel started to take witness accounts from experts in 1841. Those experts included Sir Martin Archer Shee, P.R.A., and Charles Lock Eastlake, painter and acknowledged authority on art history, soon to be first director of the National Gallery and de facto administrator of the whole Westminster decoration project. It was decided that the opportunity should be seized to encourage the development of a national British school of History Painting, and that the paintings should be done in fresco.

The call for artists to submit proposals resulted in a first exhibition in 1843 at Westminster Hall in which 140 cartoons were shown. Others followed but the progress was slow. Fresco proved to be a problematic technique for the English climate. The wall surfaces to be covered were vast and therefore a number of paintings were in fact done in oil on canvas. With the death of Prince Albert in 1861 the scheme lost its driving force, but by then many paintings were completed or underway. William Dyce, who was the first to start fresco work in 1848, died in 1864, completing only five of seven commissioned works. The other major contributors were John Rogers Herbert, finishing in 1864 but having had some commissions cancelled, Charles West Cope who worked until 1869, Edward Matthew Ward until 1874, Edward Armitage, George Frederic Watts, John Callcott Horsley, John Tenniel, and Daniel Maclise. In the 20th century, further paintings were commissioned from other artists.

== Recent history ==
During the Second World War (see The Blitz), the Palace of Westminster was hit by bombs on fourteen separate occasions. One bomb fell into Old Palace Yard on 26 September 1940 and severely damaged the south wall of St Stephen's Porch and the west front. The statue of Richard the Lionheart was lifted from its pedestal by the force of the blast, and its upheld sword bent, an image that was used as a symbol of the strength of democracy, "which would bend but not break under attack". Another bomb destroyed much of the Cloisters on 8 December.

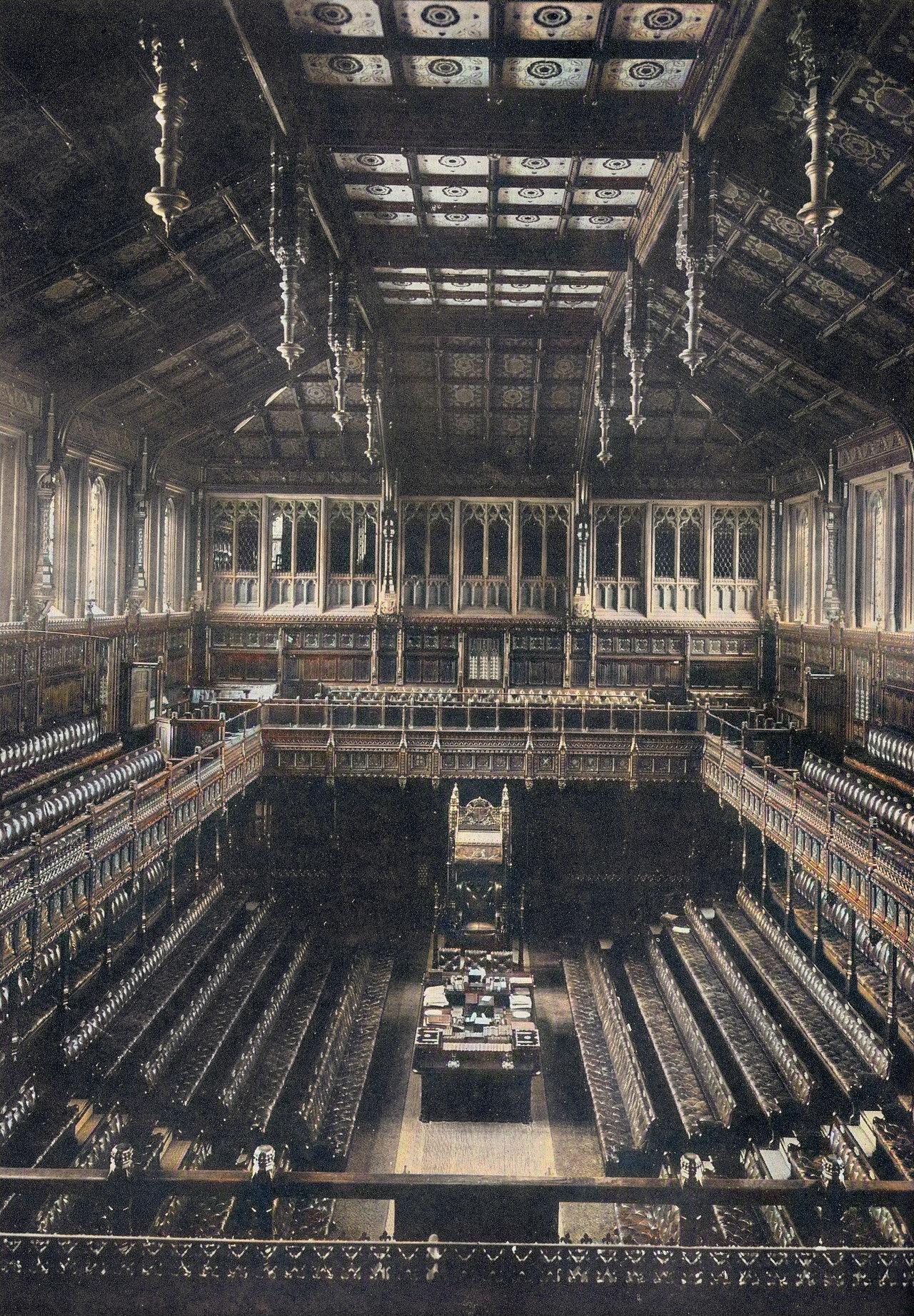
The old chamber of the House of Commons was in use between 1852 and 1941, when it was destroyed by German bombs in the course of the Second World War.

The worst raid took place in the night of 10–11 May 1941, when the Palace took at least twelve hits and three people (two policemen and the Resident Superintendent of the House of Lords, Edward Elliott) were killed. An incendiary bomb hit the chamber of the House of Commons and set it on fire; another set the roof of Westminster Hall alight. The firefighters could not save both, and a decision was taken to try to rescue the Hall. In this they were successful; the abandoned Commons Chamber, on the other hand, was destroyed, as was the Members' Lobby. A bomb also struck the Lords Chamber, but went through the floor without exploding. The Clock Tower took a hit by a small bomb or anti-aircraft shell at the eaves of the roof, suffering much damage there. All the glass on the south dial was blown out, but the hands and bells were not affected, and the Great Clock continued to keep time accurately.

Following the destruction of the Commons Chamber, the Lords offered their own debating chamber for the use of the Commons; for their own sittings the Queen's Robing Room was converted into a makeshift chamber. The Commons Chamber was rebuilt after the war under the architect Giles Gilbert Scott, in a simplified version of the old chamber's style. The work was undertaken by John Mowlem & Co., and construction lasted until 1950, when King George VI opened the new chamber in a ceremony which took place in Westminster Hall on 26 October. The Lords Chamber was then renovated over the ensuing months; the Lords re-occupied it in May 1951.

As the need for office space in the Palace increased, Parliament acquired office space in the nearby Norman Shaw Building in 1975, and in the custom-built Portcullis House, completed in 2000. This increase has enabled all MPs to have their own office facilities.

The Palace of Westminster, which is a Grade I listed building, is in urgent need of extensive restoration to its fabric. A 2012 pre-feasibility report set out several options, including the possibility of Parliament moving to other premises while work is carried out. At the same time, the option of moving Parliament to a new location was discounted, with staying at the Westminster site preferred. An Independent Options Appraisal Report released in June 2015 found that the cost to restore the Palace of Westminster could be as much as £7.1 billion if MPs were to remain at the Palace whilst works take place. MPs decided in 2016 to vacate the building for six years starting in 2022. In January 2018, the House of Commons voted for both houses to vacate the Palace of Westminster to allow for a complete refurbishment of the building which may take up to six years starting in 2025. It is expected that the House of Commons will be temporarily housed in a replica chamber to be located in Richmond House in Whitehall and the House of Lords will be housed at the Queen Elizabeth II Conference Centre in Parliament Square.
