= Cloyes =

Cloyes may refer to:

== Places ==
- Cloyes-sur-le-Loir, France
- Canton of Cloyes-sur-le-Loir, France
- Cloyes-sur-Marne, France

== Persons with the surname ==
- Bertha Maria Cloyes (19th century)
- Harry Cloyes (20th–21st centuries)
- Shirley Cloyes (20th–21st centuries)

== See also ==
- Stephen of Cloyes
