= Pierre Prévost =

Pierre Prévost may refer to:

- Pierre Prévost (painter) (1764–1823), French panorama painter
- Pierre Prevost (physicist) (1751–1839), Genevan philosopher and physicist
