= Douy =

Douy may refer to:

== People ==
- David Douy (born 1975), French rugby player
- Jacques Douy (1924–2010), French art director
- Max Douy (1913–2007), French art director
- Serge Douy (born 1941), French art director

== Places ==
- Douy, Eure-et-Loir, France
- Douy-la-Ramée, France
