= Vald'Yerre =

- Commune
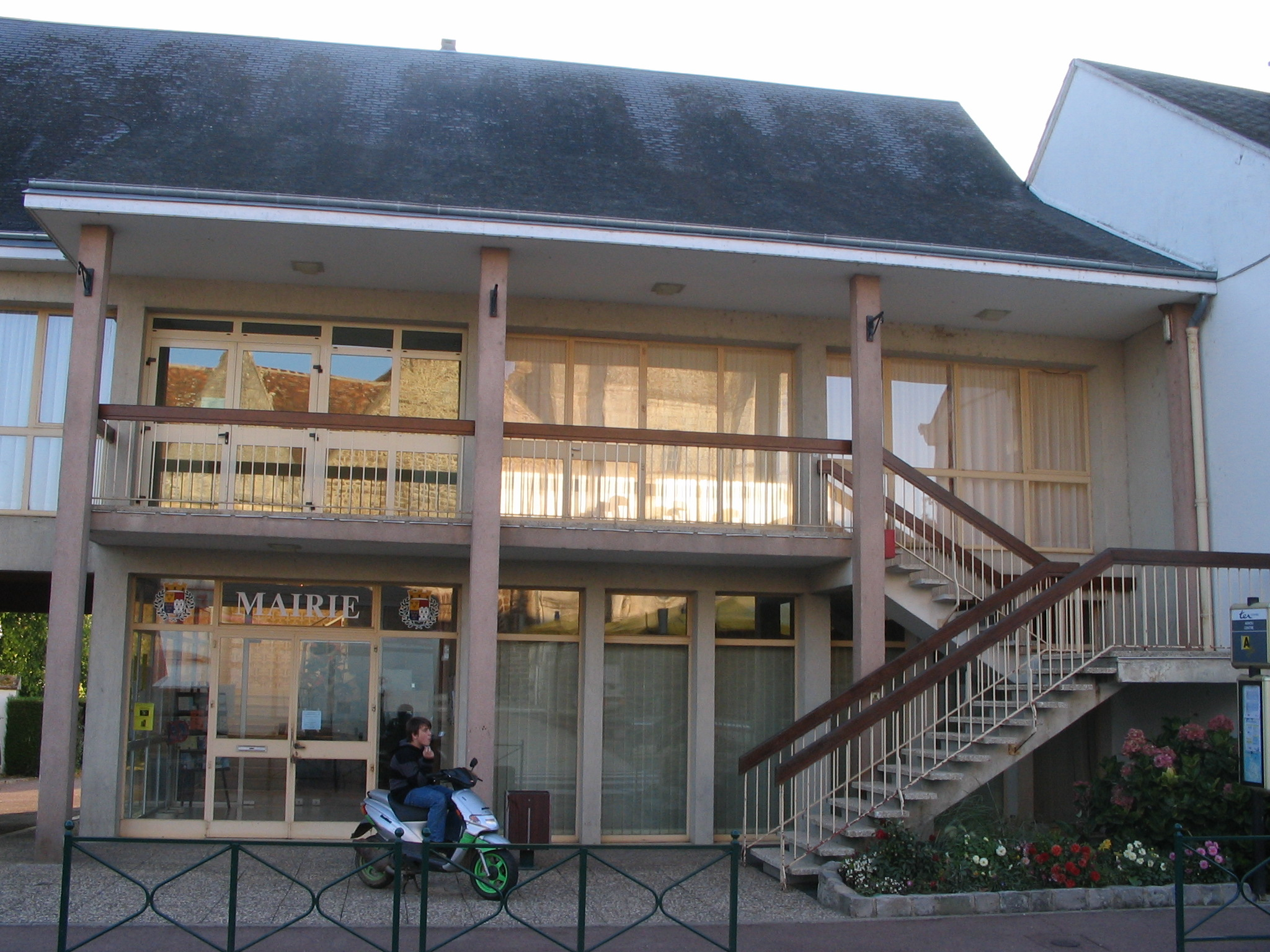
- Vald'Yerre Town Hall
- Location of Vald'Yerre
- Location within France Location within Centre-Val de Loire
- Coordinates: 48°06′04″N 1°07′26″E
- Country: France
- Region: Centre-Val de Loire
- Department: Eure-et-Loir
- Arrondissement: Châteaudun
- Canton: Brou
- Intercommunality: CC Grand Châteaudun

Government
  - Mayor (2020–2026): Franck Marchand
- Area^{1}: 145.30 km^{2} (56.10 sq mi)
- Population (2023): 3,609
  - Density: 24.84/km^{2} (64.33/sq mi)
- Time zone: UTC+01:00 (CET)
  - Summer (DST): UTC+02:00 (CEST)
- INSEE/Postal code: 28012 /28290
- ^{1} French Land Register data, which excludes lakes, ponds, glaciers > 1 km^{2} (0.386 sq mi or 247 acres) and river estuaries.

Vald'Yerre (French pronunciation: [valdjɛʁ]; before 2023: Commune nouvelle d'Arrou [kɔmyn nuvɛl daʁu], literally New Commune of Arrou) is a commune in the department of Eure-et-Loir, north-central France. The municipality was established on 1 January 2017 by merger of the former communes of Arrou (the seat), Boisgasson, Châtillon-en-Dunois, Courtalain, Langey and Saint-Pellerin.

== Population ==
Population data refer to the commune in its geography as of January 2025.

Historical population
Year	Pop.	±% p.a.
1968	4,400	—
1975	3,989	−1.39%
1982	3,964	−0.09%
1990	3,820	−0.46%
1999	3,792	−0.08%
2007	3,864	+0.24%
2012	3,890	+0.13%
2017	3,803	−0.45%
2023	3,609	−0.87%
Source: INSEE

== See also ==
- Communes of the Eure-et-Loir department
