= Cloyes-les-Trois-Rivières =

- Commune
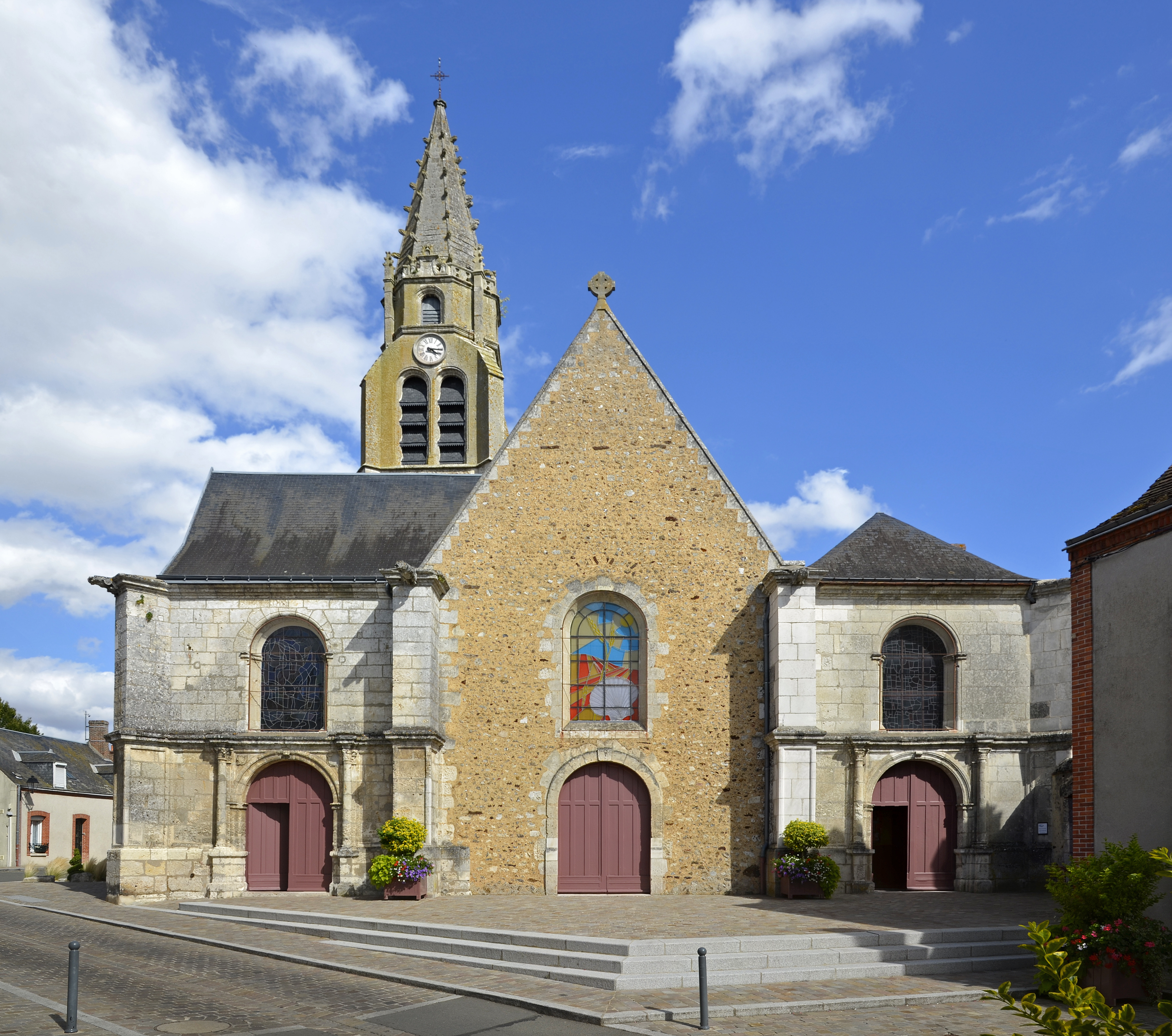
- The church in Cloyes
- Location of Cloyes-les-Trois-Rivières
- Location within France Location within Centre-Val de Loire
- Coordinates: 47°59′53″N 1°14′10″E
- Country: France
- Region: Centre-Val de Loire
- Department: Eure-et-Loir
- Arrondissement: Châteaudun
- Canton: Brou
- Intercommunality: CC Grand Châteaudun

Government
  - Mayor (2020–2026): Didier Renvoisé
- Area^{1}: 119.19 km^{2} (46.02 sq mi)
- Population (2023): 5,607
  - Density: 47.04/km^{2} (121.8/sq mi)
- Time zone: UTC+01:00 (CET)
  - Summer (DST): UTC+02:00 (CEST)
- INSEE/Postal code: 28103 /28220
- Website: www.cloyeslestroisrivieres.fr
- ^{1} French Land Register data, which excludes lakes, ponds, glaciers > 1 km^{2} (0.386 sq mi or 247 acres) and river estuaries.

Cloyes-les-Trois-Rivières (French pronunciation: [klwa le tʁwɑ ʁivjɛʁ], literally 'Cloyes the Three Rivers') is a commune in the department of Eure-et-Loir, north-central France. The municipality was established on 1 January 2017 by merging the former communes of Cloyes-sur-le-Loir (the seat), Autheuil, Charray, Douy, La Ferté-Villeneuil, Le Mée, Montigny-le-Gannelon, Romilly-sur-Aigre and Saint-Hilaire-sur-Yerre.

Cloyes-sur-le-Loir is listed as a Village étape.

== Population ==
Population data refer to the commune in its geography as of January 2025.

Historical population
Year	Pop.	±% p.a.
1968	4,973	—
1975	4,996	+0.07%
1982	5,212	+0.61%
1990	5,367	+0.37%
1999	5,492	+0.26%
2007	5,525	+0.07%
2012	5,803	+0.99%
2017	5,662	−0.49%
2023	5,607	−0.16%
Source: INSEE

== See also ==
- Communes of the Eure-et-Loir department
