= Saint-Hilaire-sur-Yerre =

- Part of Cloyes-les-Trois-Rivières
- Location of Saint-Hilaire-sur-Yerre
- Location within France Location within Centre-Val de Loire
- Coordinates: 48°01′42″N 1°15′19″E
- Country: France
- Region: Centre-Val de Loire
- Department: Eure-et-Loir
- Arrondissement: Châteaudun
- Canton: Brou
- Commune: Cloyes-les-Trois-Rivières
- Area^{1}: 16.84 km^{2} (6.50 sq mi)
- Elevation: 101 m (331 ft)
- Highest elevation: 155 m (509 ft)
- Lowest elevation: 95 m (312 ft)
- Population (2019): 559
  - Density: 33.2/km^{2} (86.0/sq mi)
- Time zone: UTC+01:00 (CET)
  - Summer (DST): UTC+02:00 (CEST)
- Postal code: 28220
- ^{1} French Land Register data, which excludes lakes, ponds, glaciers > 1 km^{2} (0.386 sq mi or 247 acres) and river estuaries.

Saint-Hilaire-sur-Yerre (French pronunciation: [sɛ̃.t‿ilɛʁ syʁ jɛʁ]) is a former commune in the Eure-et-Loir department in northern France. On 1 January 2017, it was merged into the new commune Cloyes-les-Trois-Rivières.

== Population ==
Historical population
Year	Pop.	±% p.a.
1962	415	—
1968	406	−0.36%
1975	400	−0.21%
1982	521	+3.85%
1990	565	+1.02%
1999	560	−0.10%
2006	514	−1.22%
2019	559	+0.65%
Source: EHESS and INSEE

== See also ==
- Communes of the Eure-et-Loir department
