= Arrou =

Commune in Eure-et-Loir, France

- Part of Commune nouvelle d'Arrou
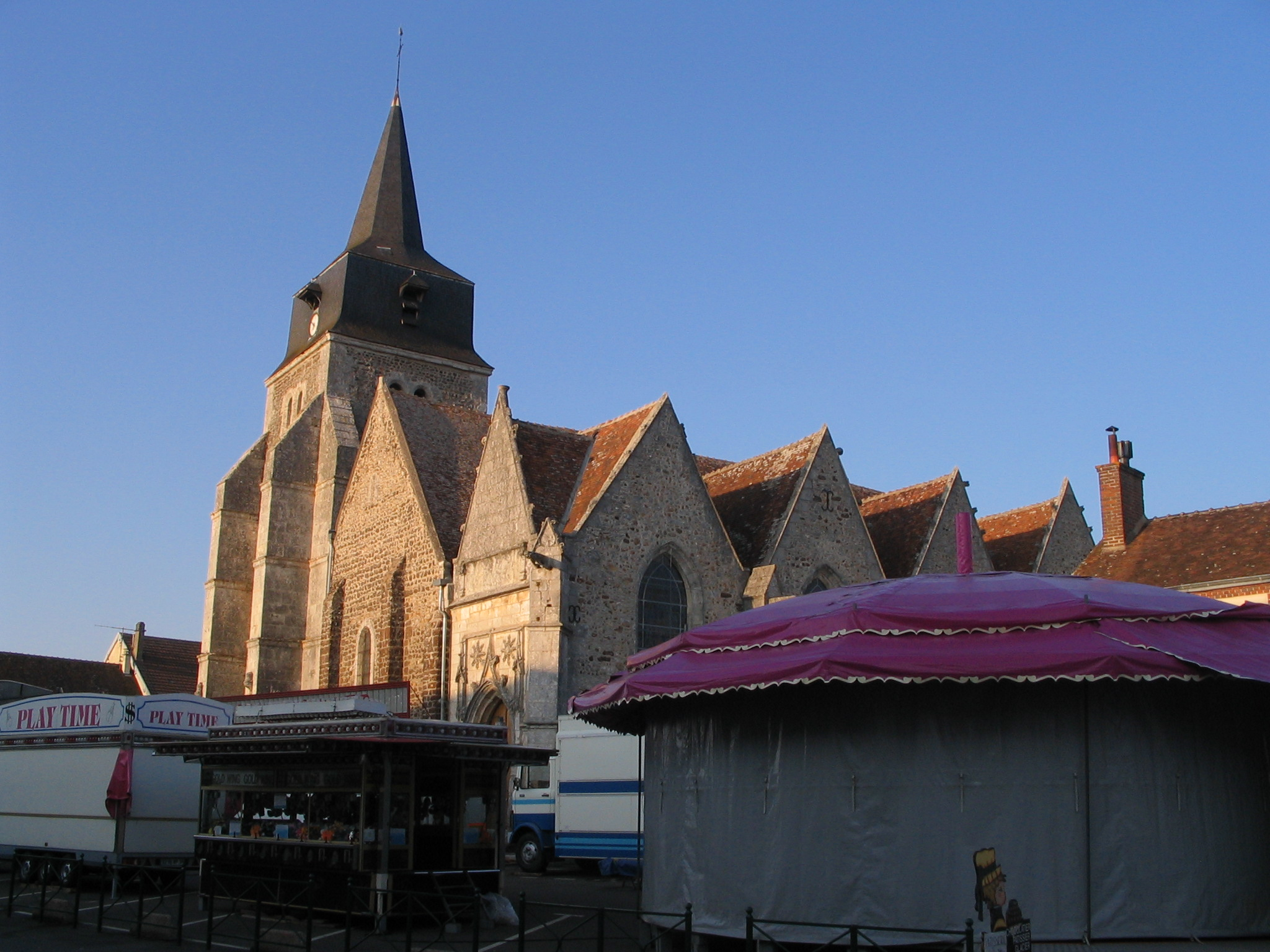

- Coat of arms
- Location of Arrou
- Location within France Location within Centre-Val de Loire
- Coordinates: 48°06′05″N 1°07′26″E
- Country: France
- Region: Centre-Val de Loire
- Department: Eure-et-Loir
- Arrondissement: Châteaudun
- Canton: Brou
- Commune: Commune nouvelle d'Arrou
- Area^{1}: 64.98 km^{2} (25.09 sq mi)
- Elevation: 164 m (538 ft)
- Highest elevation: 220 m (720 ft)
- Lowest elevation: 138 m (453 ft)
- Population (2018): 1,432
  - Density: 22.04/km^{2} (57.08/sq mi)
- Time zone: UTC+01:00 (CET)
  - Summer (DST): UTC+02:00 (CEST)
- Postal code: 28290
- ^{1} French Land Register data, which excludes lakes, ponds, glaciers > 1 km^{2} (0.386 sq mi or 247 acres) and river estuaries.

Arrou is a former commune in the Eure-et-Loir department in northern France. On 1 January 2017, it was merged into the new commune Commune nouvelle d'Arrou.

== Population ==
Historical population
Year	Pop.	±% p.a.
1962	2,078	—
1968	1,957	−0.99%
1975	1,841	−0.87%
1982	1,825	−0.12%
1990	1,777	−0.33%
1999	1,770	−0.04%
2006	1,689	−0.67%
2018	1,432	−1.37%
Source: EHESS and INSEE

== See also ==
- Communes of the Eure-et-Loir department
- Perche
