= Pierre Prévost (painter) =

French painter (1764–1823)

- Born: 7 December 1764; Montigny-le-Gannelon
- Died: 1823
- Resting place: Père Lachaise Cemetery
- Occupations: Painter, artist, landscape painter, panoramist

Pierre Prévost (7 December 1764 – 30 August 1823) was the first French panorama painter.

Born in the city of Montigny-le-Gannelon, he was a student of Pierre-Henri de Valenciennes. He died in Paris and is buried there in the Père Lachaise Cemetery.

== Panoramas ==
- View of Paris from the Tuileries, with the help of Constant Bourgeois, Denis Fontaine and Jean Mouchet
- The evacuation of Toulon by English in 1793
- Panorama of Lyon
- View of Amsterdam
- Panorama of Rome
- Panorama of Naples
- Fleet at Boulogne preparing to invade England
- View of the meeting between French and Russian Emperors at Tilsitt
- Battle of Wagram
- Panorama of Jerusalem
- Panorama of Athens
- A Panoramic View of London, from the Tower of St. Margaret's Church, Westminster, acquired by the Museum of London in July 2018.

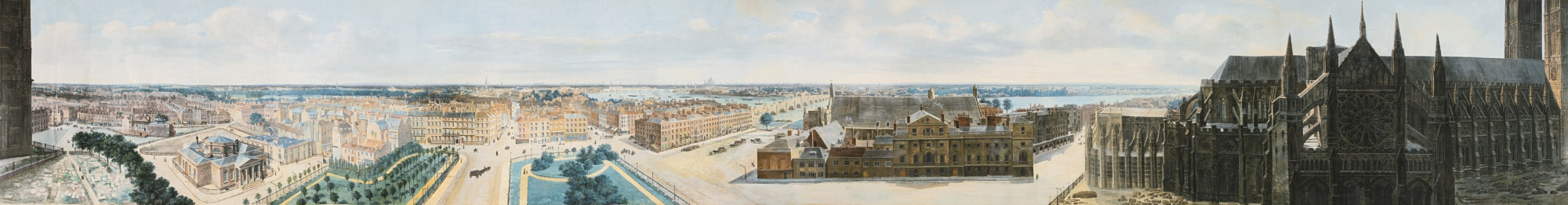
A Panoramic View of London, from the Tower of St. Margaret's Church, Westminster

== Sources ==
- Michaud et Michaud, Biographie universelle, ancienne et moderne, t. 36, Paris, L. G. Michaud, pp. 60–2.
- Louis du Chalard & Antoine Gautier, « Les panoramas orientaux du peintre Pierre Prévost (1764-1823) », in Orients, Bulletin de l'association des anciens élèves et amis des langues orientales, juin 2010, pp. 85–108.
- Louis du Chalard & Antoine Gautier, « Le Panorama de Constantinople, anonyme 20 828 du musée du Louvre, dévoile une partie de ses secrets », in Orients, Bulletin de l'association des anciens élèves et amis des langues orientales, juin 2011, p. 95-98.
- Bernard Comment, Le XIX^{e} siècle des panoramas, essai, Adam Biro, 1993, pp. 18-22.
- Bernard Comment, The painted panoramas, New-York, 1999, pp. 29–46.
- Les hommes illustres de l'Orléanais, 1852.
- Jean Prévost, Notice historique sur Montigny-le-Gannelon, Châteaudun, 1852.
- John Gorton, General Biographical Dictionary, 1833, volume II.
- Dictionnaire général des lettres des beaux-arts et des sciences, Théodore Bachelet, 1862, vol. II, p. 1364.
- Biografia degli artisti, 1836.
