= Courtalain =

- Part of Commune nouvelle d'Arrou
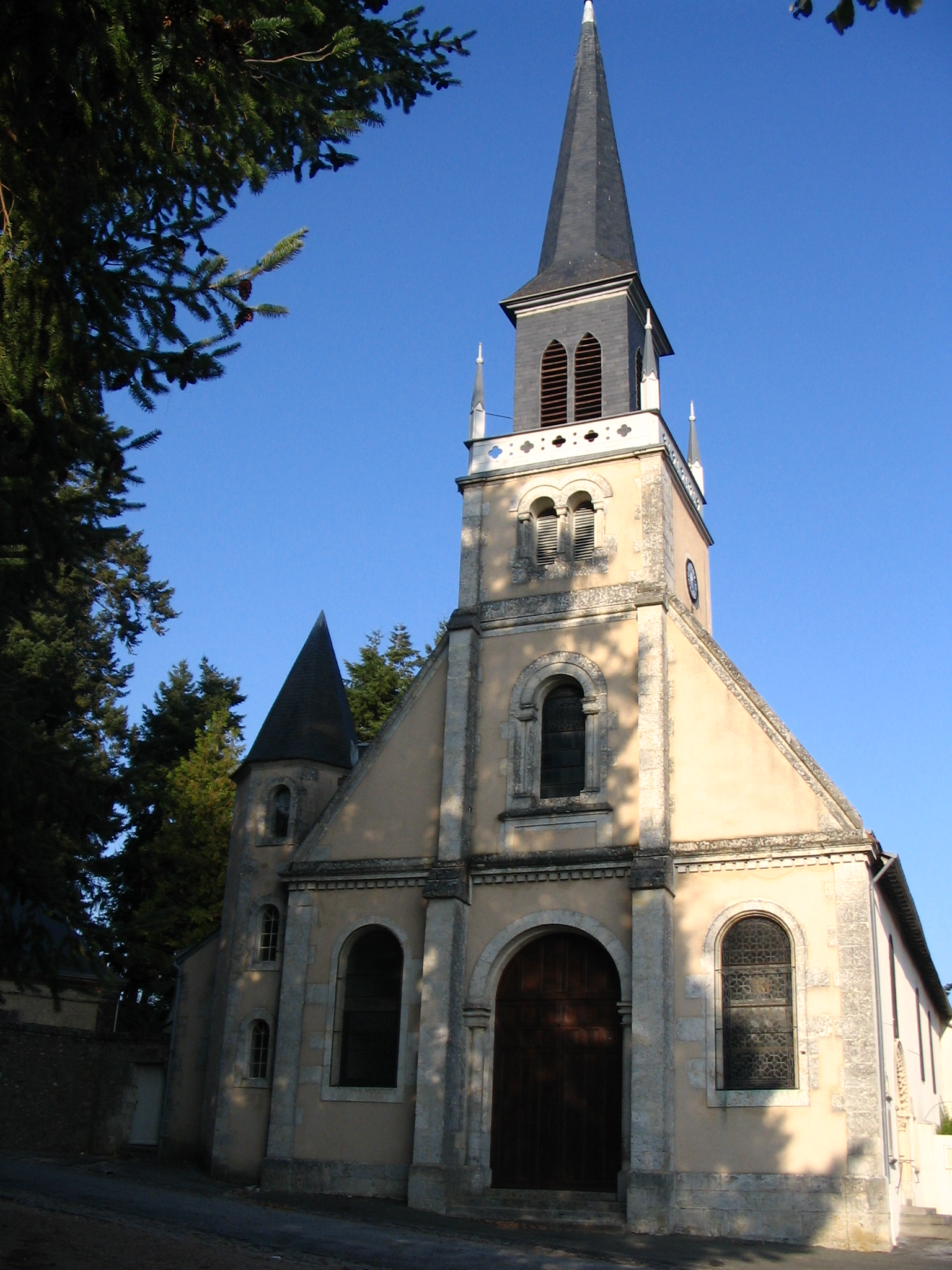

- Coat of arms
- Location of Courtalain
- Location within France Location within Centre-Val de Loire
- Coordinates: 48°04′49″N 1°08′20″E
- Country: France
- Region: Centre-Val de Loire
- Department: Eure-et-Loir
- Arrondissement: Châteaudun
- Canton: Brou
- Commune: Commune nouvelle d'Arrou
- Area^{1}: 2.47 km^{2} (0.95 sq mi)
- Elevation: 152 m (499 ft)
- Highest elevation: 160 m (520 ft)
- Lowest elevation: 130 m (430 ft)
- Population (2018): 656
  - Density: 266/km^{2} (688/sq mi)
- Time zone: UTC+01:00 (CET)
  - Summer (DST): UTC+02:00 (CEST)
- Postal code: 28290
- ^{1} French Land Register data, which excludes lakes, ponds, glaciers > 1 km^{2} (0.386 sq mi or 247 acres) and river estuaries.

Courtalain (French pronunciation: [kuʁtalɛ̃]) is a former commune in the Eure-et-Loir department in northern France. On 1 January 2017, it was merged into the new commune Commune nouvelle d'Arrou.

== Population ==
Historical population
Year	Pop.	±% p.a.
1962	601	—
1968	533	−1.98%
1975	534	+0.03%
1982	593	+1.51%
1990	583	−0.21%
1999	558	−0.49%
2006	590	+0.80%
2018	656	+0.89%
Source: EHESS and INSEE

== See also ==
- Communes of the Eure-et-Loir department
