= Langey =

- Part of Commune nouvelle d'Arrou
- Location of Langey
- Location within France Location within Centre-Val de Loire
- Coordinates: 48°02′39″N 1°11′14″E
- Country: France
- Region: Centre-Val de Loire
- Department: Eure-et-Loir
- Arrondissement: Châteaudun
- Canton: Brou
- Commune: Commune nouvelle d'Arrou
- Area^{1}: 19.48 km^{2} (7.52 sq mi)
- Elevation: 157 m (515 ft)
- Highest elevation: 159 m (522 ft)
- Lowest elevation: 110 m (360 ft)
- Population (2018): 355
  - Density: 18.2/km^{2} (47.2/sq mi)
- Time zone: UTC+01:00 (CET)
  - Summer (DST): UTC+02:00 (CEST)
- Postal code: 28220
- ^{1} French Land Register data, which excludes lakes, ponds, glaciers > 1 km^{2} (0.386 sq mi or 247 acres) and river estuaries.

Langey (French pronunciation: [lɑ̃ʒɛ]) is a former commune in the Eure-et-Loir department in northern France. On 1 January 2017, it was merged into the new commune Commune nouvelle d'Arrou.

== See also ==
- Communes of the Eure-et-Loir department
