= A Panoramic View of London, from the Tower of St. Margaret's Church, Westminster =

1815 painting by Pierre Prévost

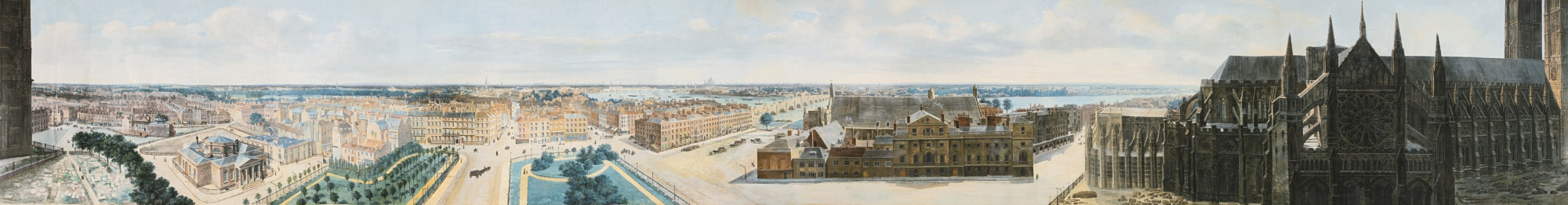
- Artist: Pierre Prévost
- Year: 1815
- Medium: Watercolor, paper, canvas
- Subject: Panorama of Westminster
- Dimensions: 85 cm × 605 cm (2.79 ft × 19.85 ft)
- Location: Museum of London
- Owner: Museum of London

A Panoramic View of London, from the Tower of St. Margaret's Church, Westminster is a painting made in 1815 by Pierre Prévost, acquired by the Museum of London in July 2018. It is particularly significant for its depiction of the pre-1834 Palace of Westminster.

== Creation ==
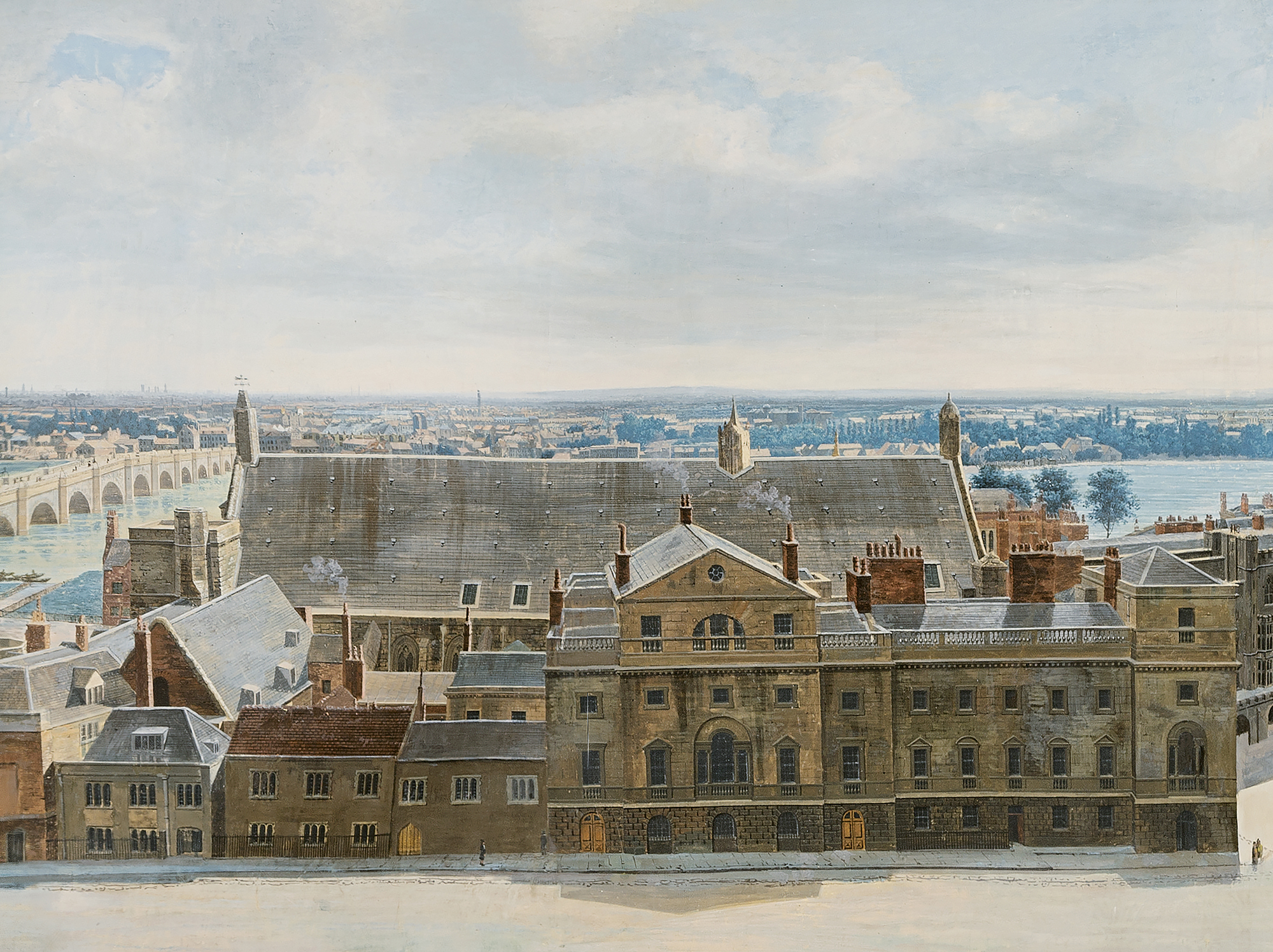
Section of the work showing the Palace of Westminster, with Westminster Bridge crossing the River Thames in the background

The work uses watercolour and bodycolour over pencil, on paper, which has been mounted on canvass. It is 605 centimetres (19.85 ft) long. It is a sketch for a larger work, now lost, which was displayed as a visitor attraction in Paris. That work was 30 metres (98 ft) long (or in diameter; sources vary).

== Depictions ==
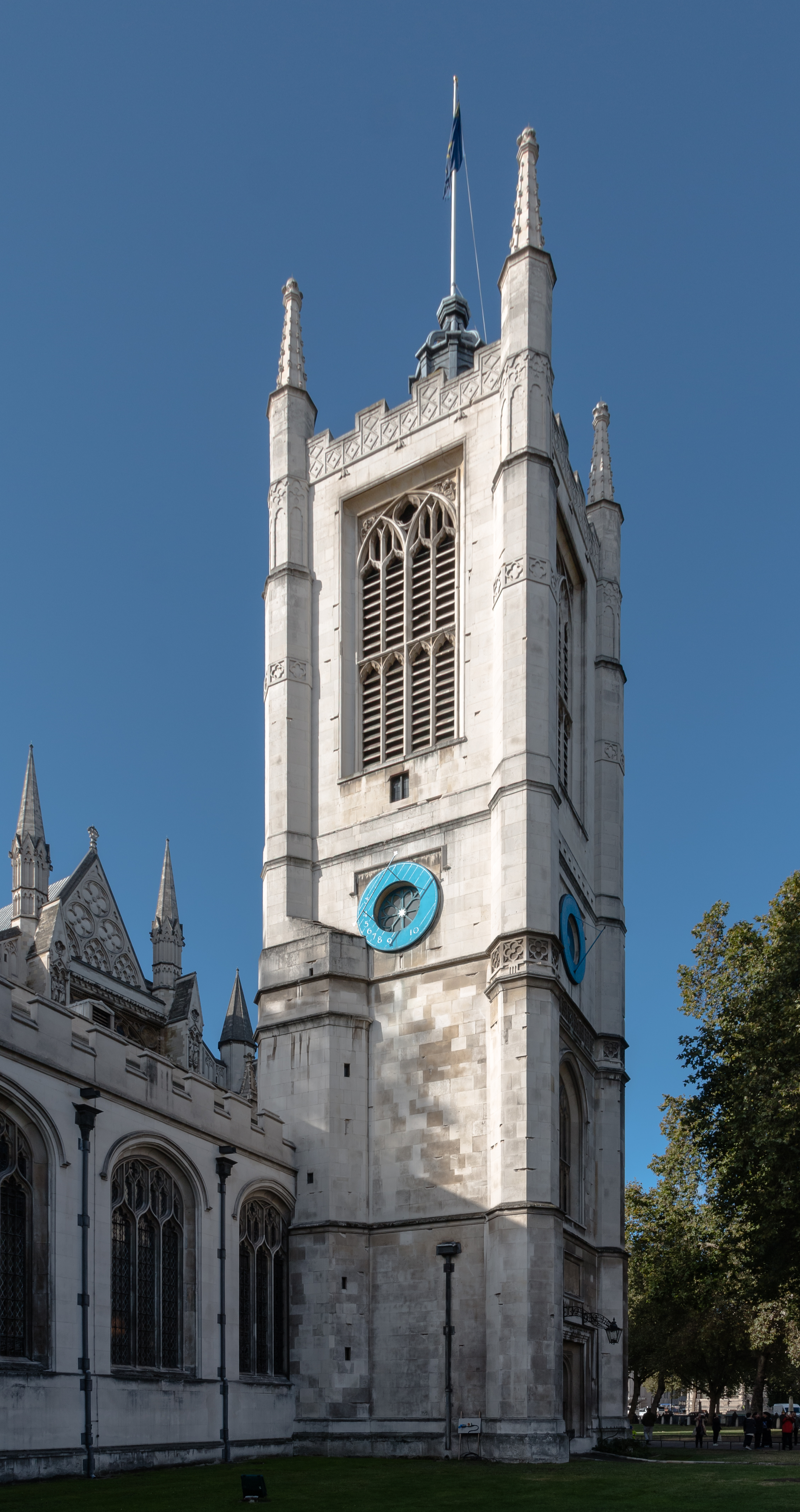
The tower of St. Margaret's, seen here in 2016, was Prévost's vantage point

Prévost painted the view from the tower of St. Margaret's, including (from left to right):

- Westminster Abbey (part)
- Guildhall
- Whitehall
- St Martin-in-the-Fields
- St James's Park
- Banqueting House
- River Thames
- Waterloo Bridge (under construction)
- St Paul's Cathedral
- Westminster Bridge
- Palace of Westminster
- Westminster Abbey

This was before the 1834 fire which destroyed much of the Palace of Westminster; and the Palace's subsequent rebuilding.

== Provenance ==
On 4 July 2018, the painting was auctioned at Sotheby's in London, after being re-found in the south of France. It was purchased for £250,000 by the Museum of London, with partial funding by the Art Fund.
