= Saint-Pellerin, Eure-et-Loir =

Saint-Pellerin
- Part of Commune nouvelle d'Arrou
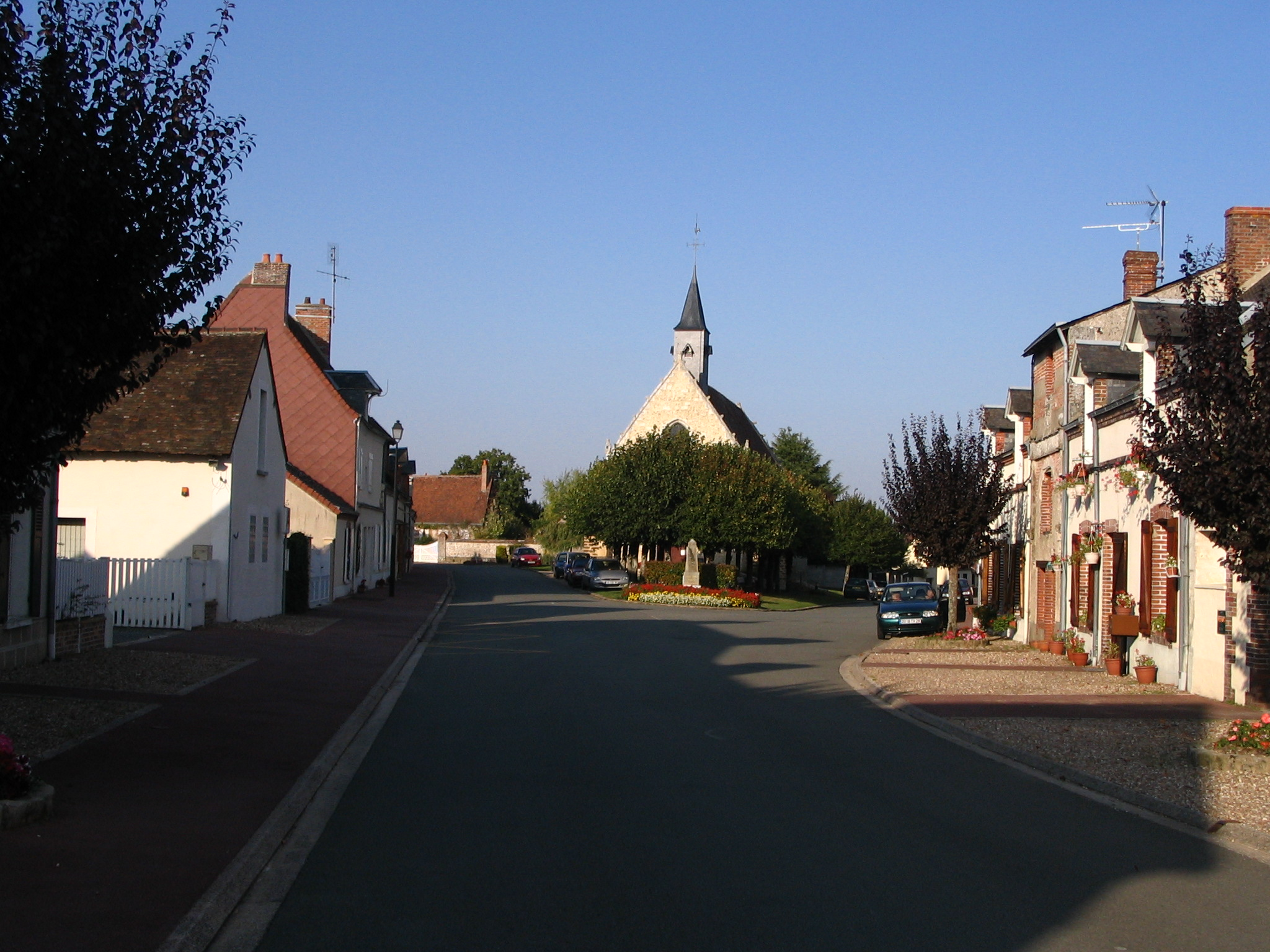
- Location of Saint-Pellerin
- Location within France Location within Centre-Val de Loire
- Coordinates: 48°04′20″N 1°08′32″E
- Country: France
- Region: Centre-Val de Loire
- Department: Eure-et-Loir
- Arrondissement: Châteaudun
- Canton: Brou
- Commune: Commune nouvelle d'Arrou
- Area^{1}: 13.68 km^{2} (5.28 sq mi)
- Elevation: 156 m (512 ft)
- Highest elevation: 162 m (531 ft)
- Lowest elevation: 126 m (413 ft)
- Population (2018): 342
  - Density: 25.0/km^{2} (64.7/sq mi)
- Time zone: UTC+01:00 (CET)
  - Summer (DST): UTC+02:00 (CEST)
- Postal code: 28290
- ^{1} French Land Register data, which excludes lakes, ponds, glaciers > 1 km^{2} (0.386 sq mi or 247 acres) and river estuaries.

Saint-Pellerin is a former commune in the Eure-et-Loir department in northern France. On 1 January 2017, it was merged into the new commune Commune nouvelle d'Arrou.

== See also ==
- Communes of the Eure-et-Loir department
