= Le Mée, Eure-et-Loir =

Le Mée
- Part of Cloyes-les-Trois-Rivières
- Location of Le Mée
- Location within France Location within Centre-Val de Loire
- Coordinates: 47°59′11″N 1°25′00″E
- Country: France
- Region: Centre-Val de Loire
- Department: Eure-et-Loir
- Arrondissement: Châteaudun
- Canton: Brou
- Commune: Cloyes-les-Trois-Rivières
- Area^{1}: 19.11 km^{2} (7.38 sq mi)
- Elevation: 128 m (420 ft)
- Highest elevation: 134 m (440 ft)
- Lowest elevation: 106 m (348 ft)
- Population (2019): 262
  - Density: 13.7/km^{2} (35.5/sq mi)
- Time zone: UTC+01:00 (CET)
  - Summer (DST): UTC+02:00 (CEST)
- Postal code: 28220
- ^{1} French Land Register data, which excludes lakes, ponds, glaciers > 1 km^{2} (0.386 sq mi or 247 acres) and river estuaries.

Le Mée (French pronunciation: [lə me]) is a former commune in the Eure-et-Loir department in northern France. On 1 January 2017, it was merged into the new commune Cloyes-les-Trois-Rivières.

== See also ==
- Communes of the Eure-et-Loir department
