= Châtillon-en-Dunois =

- Part of Commune nouvelle d'Arrou
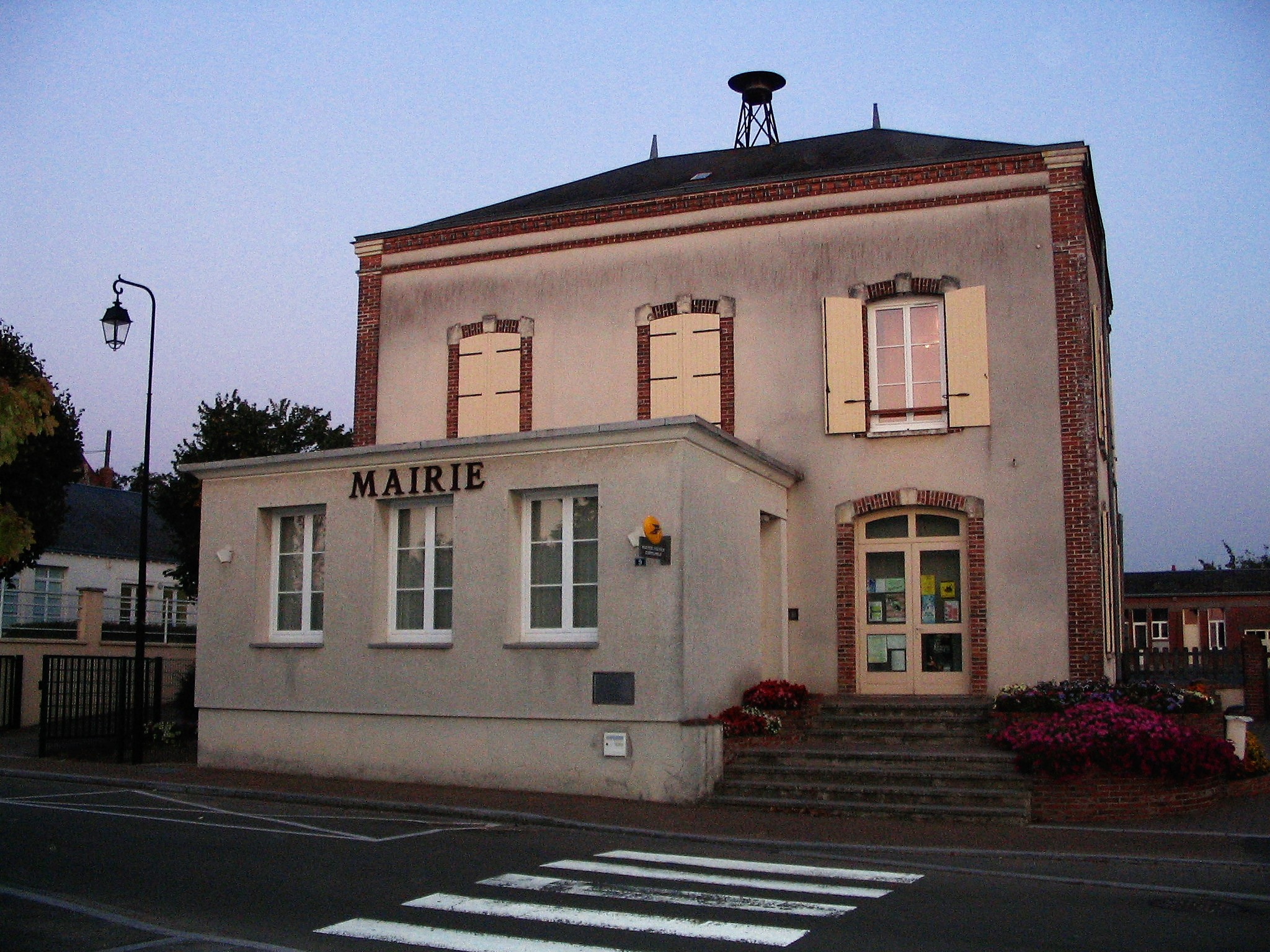
- Town hall
- Location of Châtillon-en-Dunois
- Location within France Location within Centre-Val de Loire
- Coordinates: 48°07′00″N 1°11′15″E
- Country: France
- Region: Centre-Val de Loire
- Department: Eure-et-Loir
- Arrondissement: Châteaudun
- Canton: Brou
- Commune: Commune nouvelle d'Arrou
- Area^{1}: 37.19 km^{2} (14.36 sq mi)
- Elevation: 172 m (564 ft)
- Highest elevation: 182 m (597 ft)
- Lowest elevation: 144 m (472 ft)
- Population (2018): 834
  - Density: 22.4/km^{2} (58.1/sq mi)
- Time zone: UTC+01:00 (CET)
  - Summer (DST): UTC+02:00 (CEST)
- Postal code: 28290
- ^{1} French Land Register data, which excludes lakes, ponds, glaciers > 1 km^{2} (0.386 sq mi or 247 acres) and river estuaries.

Châtillon-en-Dunois (French pronunciation: [ʃatijɔ̃ ɑ̃ dynwa]) is a former commune in the Eure-et-Loir department in northern France. On 1 January 2017, it was merged into the new commune Commune nouvelle d'Arrou.

== Population ==
Historical population
Year	Pop.	±% p.a.
1962	1,028	—
1968	967	−1.01%
1975	813	−2.45%
1982	752	−1.11%
1990	739	−0.22%
1999	716	−0.35%
2018	834	+0.81%
Source: EHESS and INSEE

== See also ==
- Communes of the Eure-et-Loir department
