= Montigny-le-Gannelon =

- Part of Cloyes-les-Trois-Rivières
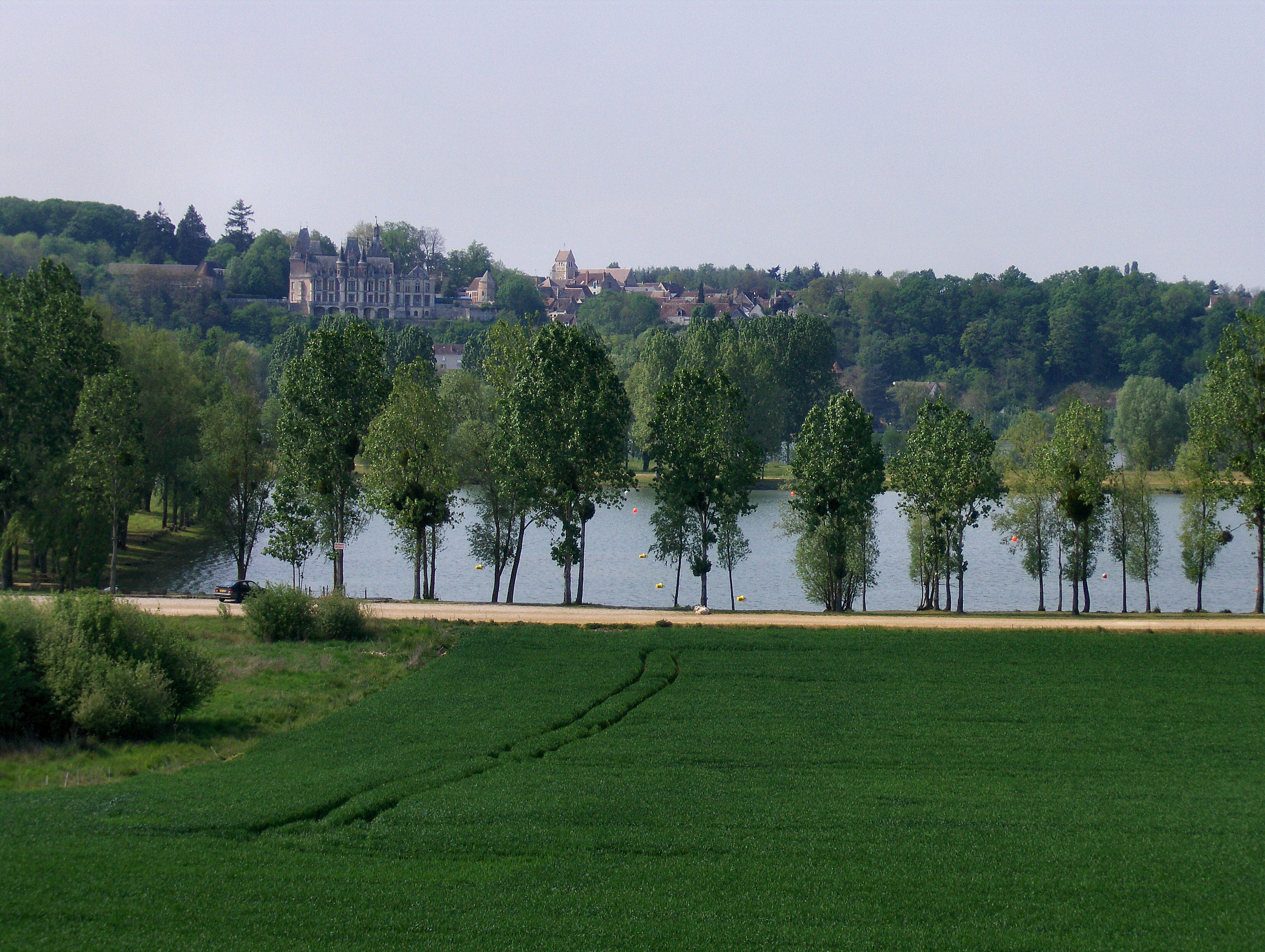
- Location of Montigny-le-Gannelon
- Location within France Location within Centre-Val de Loire
- Coordinates: 48°00′54″N 1°14′07″E
- Country: France
- Region: Centre-Val de Loire
- Department: Eure-et-Loir
- Arrondissement: Châteaudun
- Canton: Brou
- Commune: Cloyes-les-Trois-Rivières
- Area^{1}: 8.95 km^{2} (3.46 sq mi)
- Elevation: 140 m (460 ft)
- Highest elevation: 152 m (499 ft)
- Lowest elevation: 92 m (302 ft)
- Population (2019): 449
  - Density: 50.2/km^{2} (130/sq mi)
- Demonym: Montrognons
- Time zone: UTC+01:00 (CET)
  - Summer (DST): UTC+02:00 (CEST)
- Postal code: 28220
- ^{1} French Land Register data, which excludes lakes, ponds, glaciers > 1 km^{2} (0.386 sq mi or 247 acres) and river estuaries.

Montigny-le-Gannelon (French pronunciation: [mɔ̃tiɲi lə ɡanlɔ̃]) is a former commune in the Eure-et-Loir department in northern France. On 1 January 2017, it was merged into the new commune Cloyes-les-Trois-Rivières.

== See also ==
- Communes of the Eure-et-Loir department
