= Cloyes-sur-le-Loir =

- Part of Cloyes-les-Trois-Rivières
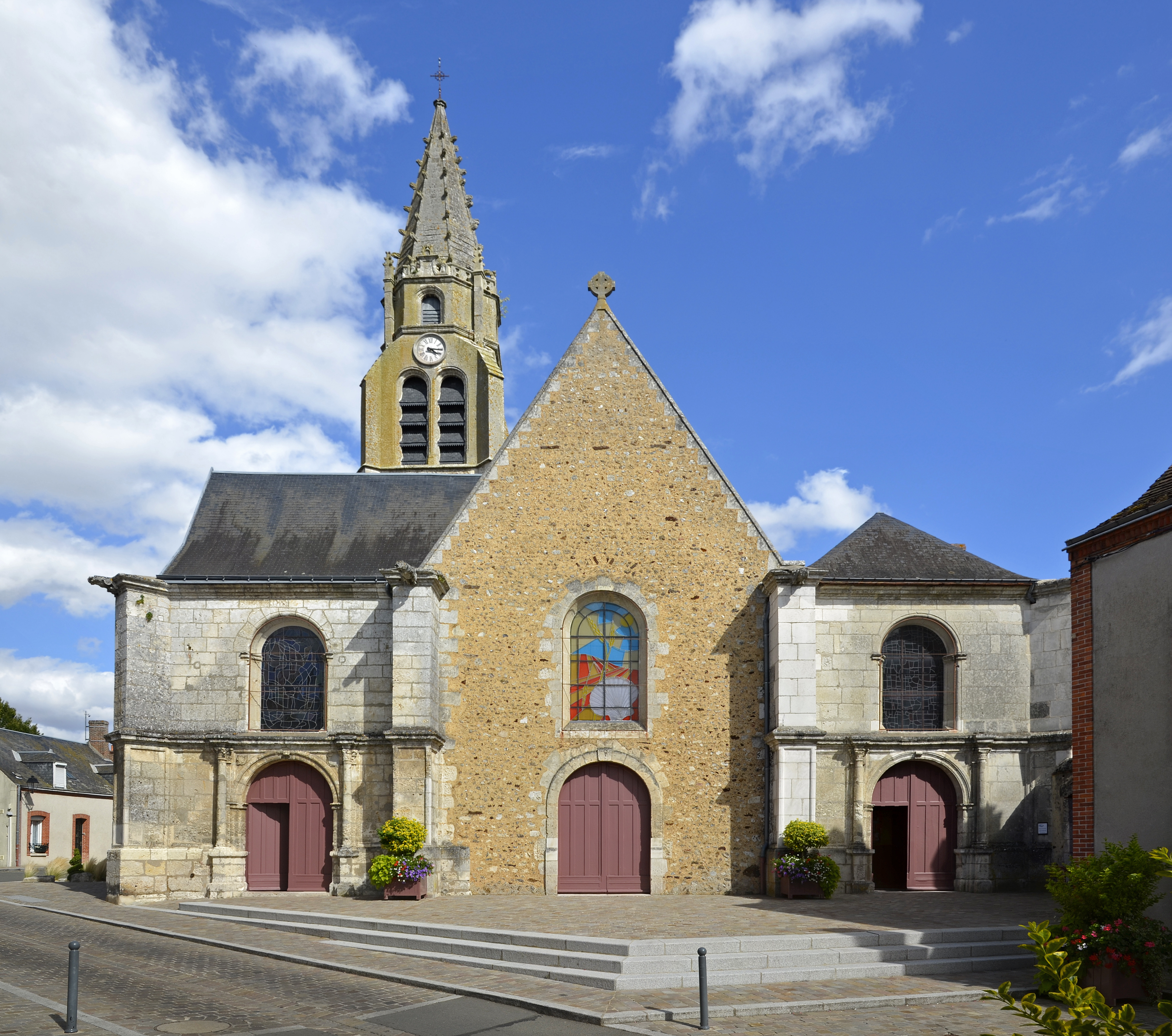

- Coat of arms
- Location of Cloyes-sur-le-Loir
- Location within France Location within Centre-Val de Loire
- Coordinates: 47°59′52″N 1°14′09″E
- Country: France
- Region: Centre-Val de Loire
- Department: Eure-et-Loir
- Arrondissement: Châteaudun
- Canton: Brou
- Commune: Cloyes-les-Trois-Rivières
- Area^{1}: 19.85 km^{2} (7.66 sq mi)
- Elevation: 105 m (344 ft)
- Highest elevation: 152 m (499 ft)
- Lowest elevation: 92 m (302 ft)
- Population (2019): 2,668
  - Density: 134.4/km^{2} (348.1/sq mi)
- Time zone: UTC+01:00 (CET)
  - Summer (DST): UTC+02:00 (CEST)
- Postal code: 28220
- ^{1} French Land Register data, which excludes lakes, ponds, glaciers > 1 km^{2} (0.386 sq mi or 247 acres) and river estuaries.

Cloyes-sur-le-Loir (French pronunciation: [klwa syʁ lə lwaʁ], literally Cloyes on the Loir) is a former commune on the River Loir, a few kilometres south of the town of Châteaudun in the department of Eure-et-Loir in northern France. On 1 January 2017, it was merged into the new commune Cloyes-les-Trois-Rivières.

== Population ==
Historical population
Year	Pop.	±% p.a.
1962	2,315	—
1968	2,478	+1.14%
1975	2,552	+0.42%
1982	2,653	+0.56%
1990	2,593	−0.29%
1999	2,636	+0.18%
2019	2,668	+0.06%
Source: EHESS and INSEE

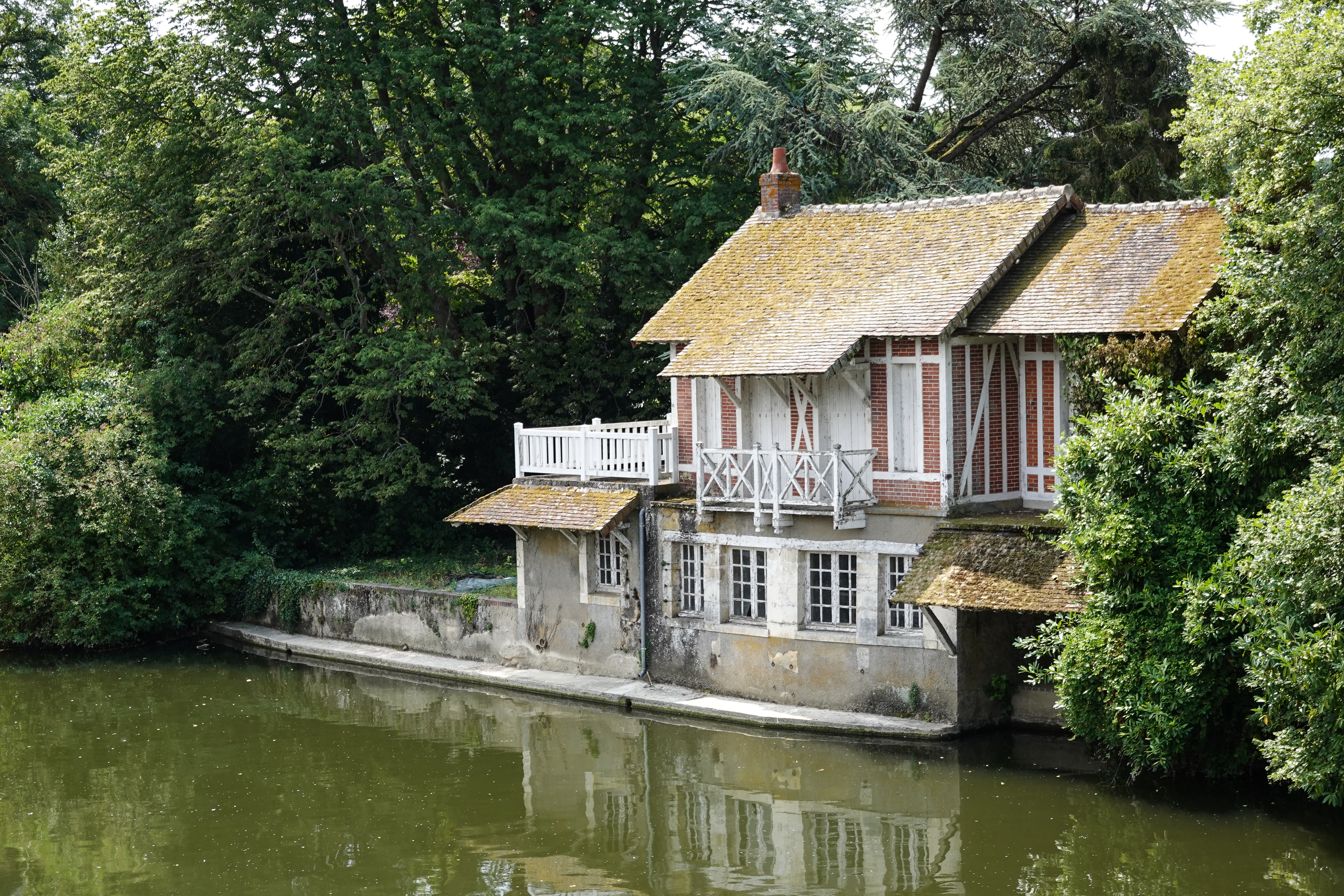
le Loir at Cloyes-sur-le-Loir

== Personalities ==
It was the home of Stephen of Cloyes, a leader of the Children's Crusade. Mezzo-soprano Juliette Borghèse was born in the town.

== See also ==
- Communes of the Eure-et-Loir department
