= Douy, Eure-et-Loir =

Douy
- Part of Cloyes-les-Trois-Rivières
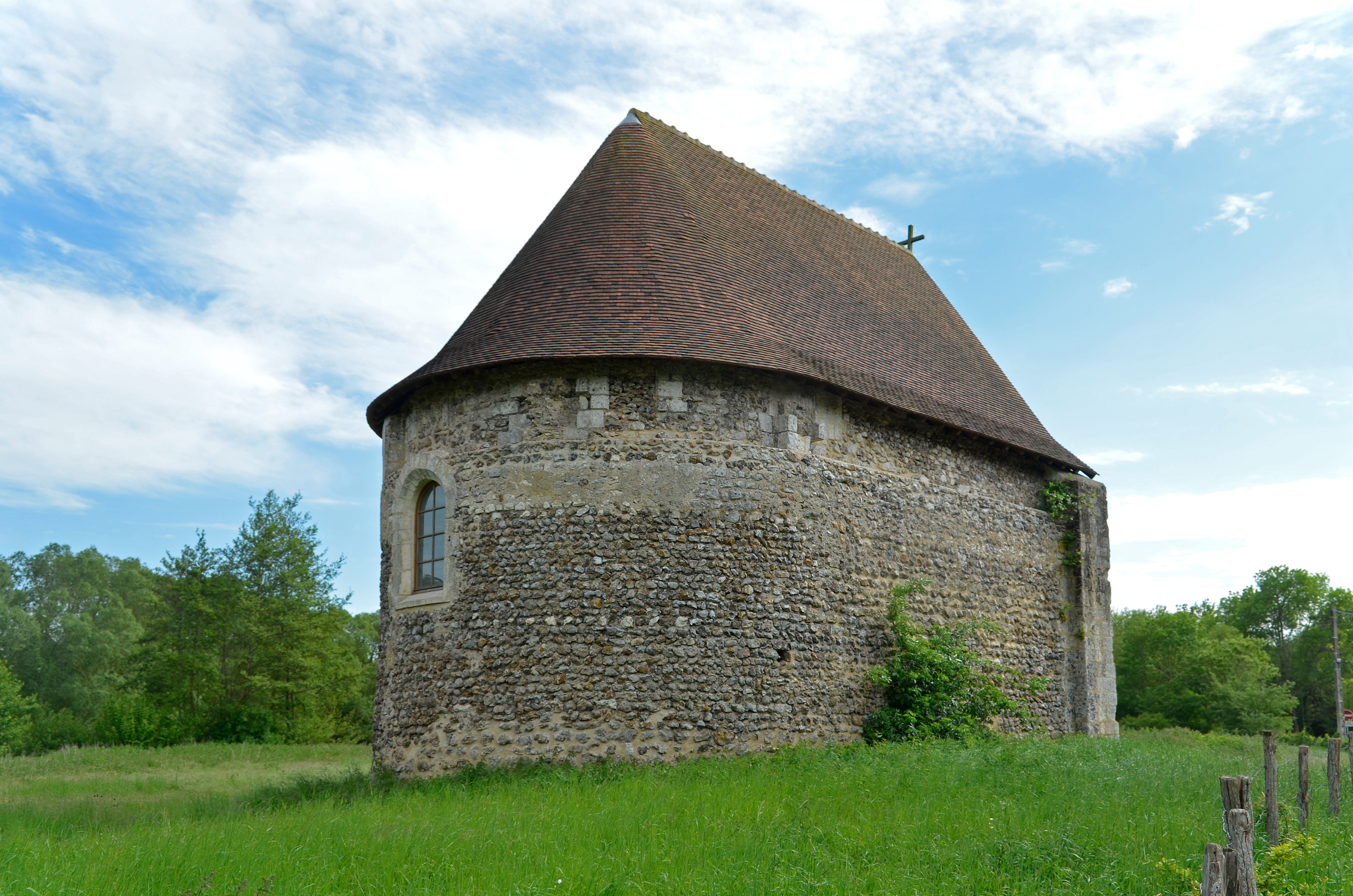
- Priory of Saint Julien

- Coat of arms
- Location of Douy
- Location within France Location within Centre-Val de Loire
- Coordinates: 48°02′12″N 1°16′16″E
- Country: France
- Region: Centre-Val de Loire
- Department: Eure-et-Loir
- Arrondissement: Châteaudun
- Canton: Brou
- Commune: Cloyes-les-Trois-Rivières
- Area^{1}: 6.84 km^{2} (2.64 sq mi)
- Elevation: 120 m (390 ft)
- Highest elevation: 146 m (479 ft)
- Lowest elevation: 97 m (318 ft)
- Population (2019): 569
  - Density: 83.2/km^{2} (215/sq mi)
- Time zone: UTC+01:00 (CET)
  - Summer (DST): UTC+02:00 (CEST)
- Postal code: 28220
- ^{1} French Land Register data, which excludes lakes, ponds, glaciers > 1 km^{2} (0.386 sq mi or 247 acres) and river estuaries.

Douy (French pronunciation: [dwi]) was a commune in the Eure-et-Loir department in northern France. On 1 January 2017, it was merged into the new commune Cloyes-les-Trois-Rivières.

== Population ==
Historical population
Year	Pop.	±% p.a.
1962	348	—
1968	300	−2.44%
1975	314	+0.65%
1982	359	+1.93%
1990	436	+2.46%
1999	447	+0.28%
2006	462	+0.47%
2019	569	+1.62%
Source: EHESS and INSEE

== See also ==
- Communes of the Eure-et-Loir department
