= 8th Dragoon Regiment (France) =

French dragoon regiment (1674–1977)

- 8e régiment de dragons
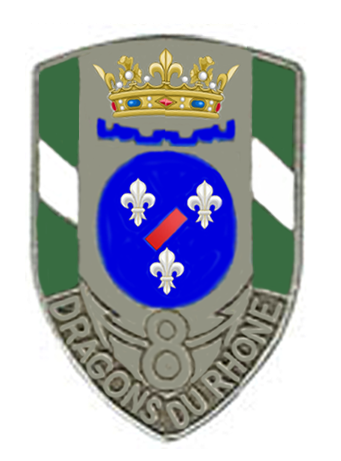
- Unit insignia
- Active: 1674–1977
- Country: France
- Type: Dragoon
- Size: Regiment
- Mottos: "Which rubs against the pricks itself." "And of the land and sea."
- Engagements: Anglo-Dutch War; War of the Reunions; French Revolutionary Wars; Napoleonic Wars; Franco-Prussian War; World War I World War II

For the 8th Dragoons in the British Army, see 8th King's Royal Irish Hussars.

The 8th Dragoon Regiment (8e régiment de dragons or 8e RD) was a cavalry regiment in the French Army created under the Ancien Régime in 1674 by the Marquis of Heudicourt.

== History ==
=== Under the Ancien Régime ===
In 1674, a new regiment was created by the Marquis of Heudicourt, named the Heudicourt Regiment. It was renamed multiple times under the command of the Ancien Régime:

• Choiseul-Praslin Regiment (1688)

• Toulouse Regiment (1693)

• Penthièvre Regiment (1737), later also "Penthièvre Regiment Dragoons"(1776)

This regiment would initially first serve in the Dutch Wars, and the Siege of Luxembourg, playing minor roles. They would enter combat at numerous points in the War of the League of Augsburg, the Battle of Neerwinden, the early bombardment of Brussels, and the War of the Spanish Succession, proving effective in most of these encounters. Following more Succession crisis in Europe, with the Penthievre Regiment serving in most of these wars, (War of the Spanish Succession, War of the Polish Succession, War of the Austrian Succession) the Penthièvre Regiment lost its commander in the Seven Years' War, and took no further action in following events.

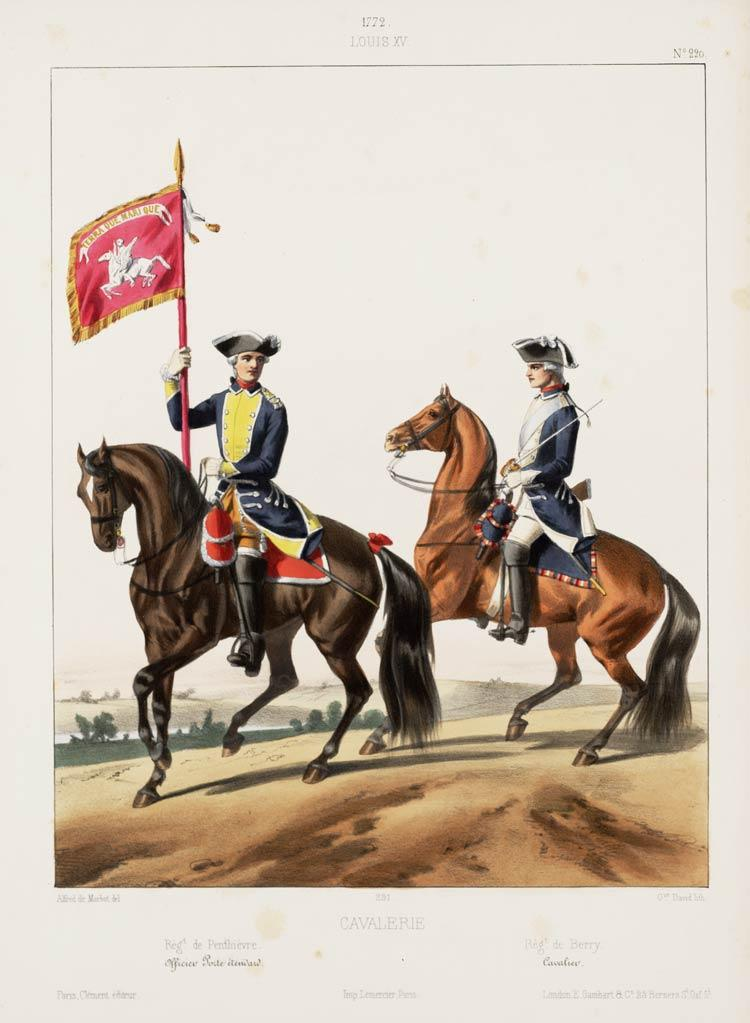
Officer of the Penthièvre Regiment carrying their standard in the Ancien Régime.

=== Revolutionary Wars ===
In the Revolutionary Wars, the Penthièvre Regiment was renamed, the 8th Dragoon Regiment. Moving from Army of the Alps to Army of the Rhine, they took part in multiple probing attacks on Coalition Forces at Mainz, and Wissembourg. Then, moved to the Army of the Moselle. In the Army of Italy, they took part in the Siege of Mantua, and the Battle of Rivoli.

After serving for more years on the Rhine (1799), in 1800, this regiment was one of three regiments that participated in the coup of 18' Brumaire, and won distinction in the Battle of Marengo.

=== Napoleonic Wars ===
The 8th Dragoons were part of the occupation force in Naples and were sent to the coast for the 'Invasion' of Britain. But in 1805, they joined the Grande Armée, participating in their early victories at Austerlitz and Jena. They were devastated at Eylau like most cavalry units and missed the Battle of Friedland.

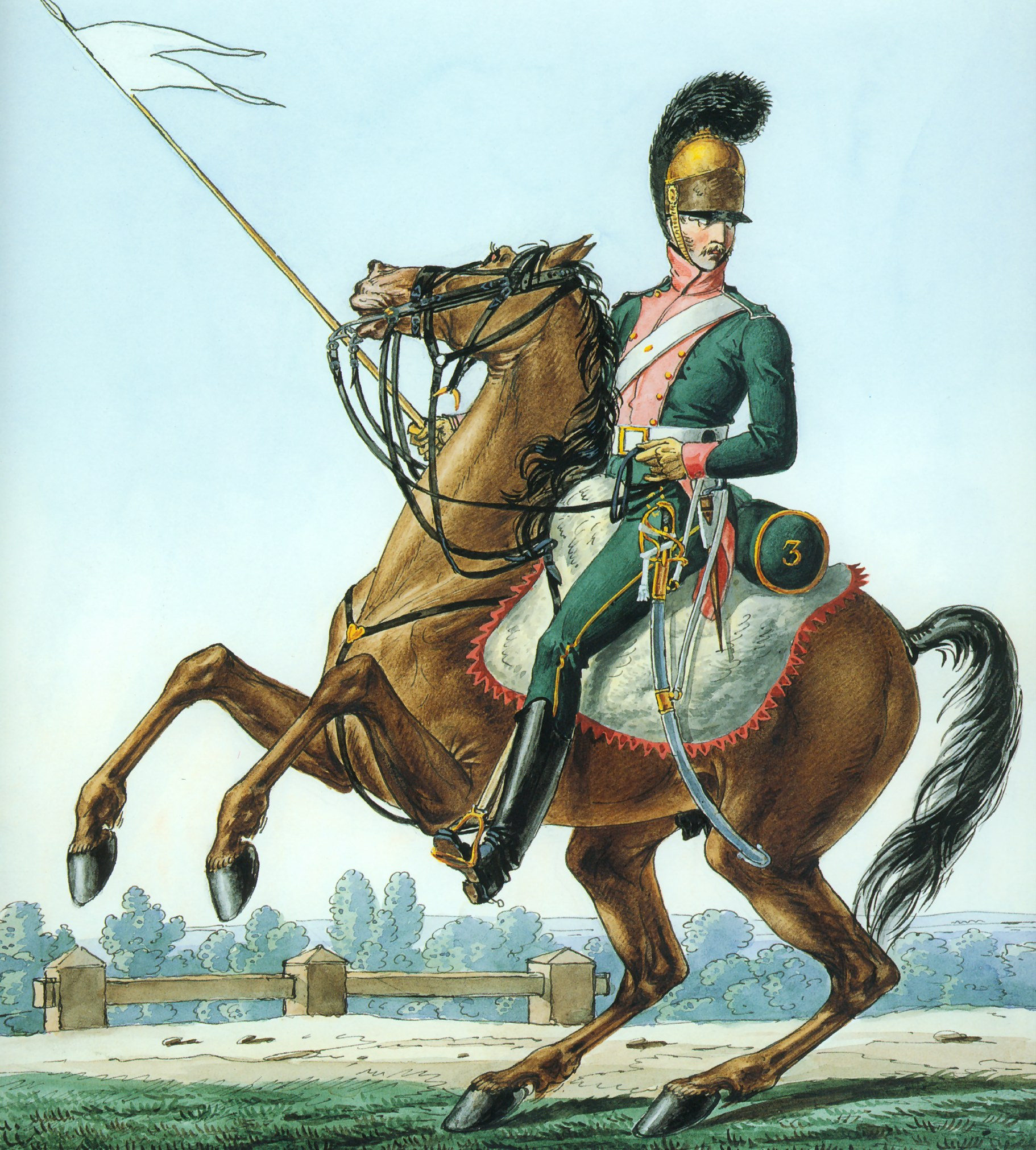
In 1811, the 8th Dragoons were renamed '3rd Regiment of Light horse Lancers.' This name was abandoned after the Bourbon Restoration.

From 1808 to 1811, the 8th Dragoons would operate entirely in the Iberian Peninsula in the Peninsular Wars. Summoned to modern day Germany in 1813, they took part in the Battle of Leipzig, in which they would be defeated. They will not take further action in the defense of France.

Following Napoleon's return from exile, the 8th Dragoons once again joined the Grande Armée, becoming part of I Corp. Missing the Battle of Ligny, the 8th Dragoons would play a role in the Battle of Waterloo, also defeated.

=== 1815 – 1914 ===
==== Bourbon Restoration ====
Following Napoleon's defeat, the 8th Dragoon Regiment was reduced to just a garrison. 1823 saw it active in Spain, and from 1825, they would be stationed at Nevers. They will not be affected by the changes in leadership, with the Bourbons overthrown, following two more republics.

==== Franco-Prussian War ====
In the Franco-Prussian War, the 8th Dragoons would be highly active, following their reinstatement as a regiment, serving in the Battles of Borny and Gravelotte. They were part of the force that tried to relieve forces participating in the siege in Metz along with the Army of the Rhine. It would be followed by skirmishes in Lorcy. Following an uprising in Paris by the French Communes, the 8th Dragoons were put under the command of the Army of Versailles, participating in the Bloody Week, acts of reprisal against the rebellion.

==== Before 1914 ====
After the end of the Franco-Prussian War, the 8th Dragoons were at patrol in Lunéville, starting from 1877. They would take no military actions as they were on garrison duty.

=== World War I ===
After World War I began, the 8th Dragoons were sent to the front. They later participated in the Battle of the Marne, and after 3 years in the trenches, the Germans tried desperately to break the stalemate. The 8th Dragoons were part of the counter offensive in 1918, first arriving at Amiens, then to the mountainous terrain of Southern Flanders, and by the end of the attack, were at Aisne.

==== Peacetime ====
During peacetime, the 8th Dragoons were quartered at Lunéville.

=== World War II ===
==== 1939 ====
The 8th Dragoon Regiment, together with 31st Dragoons, form the 4th Cavalry Brigade, itself the first part of the 2nd Cavalry Division. The 2nd Cavalry Division would station themselves in the Ardennes to delay the Germans for as long as possible, in front of the 9th Army.

==== 1940 ====
When the German attack began on May 10, 1940, the 8th Dragoons were made up of four squadrons, with the capacity of 900 men, and 1,200 horses in total. Half of the men would become prisoners of war while a small contingent was withdrawn. Nevertheless, the 8th Dragoons fought with the British Expeditionary Force in Belgium and France, delaying the Germans while the main group made its escape. By the time the remaining Allied units at the Dunkirk Pocket surrendered, the 8th Dragoons virtually ceased to exist.

==== 1941 ====
The 8th Dragoons were recreated by the Vichy Government under the command of the Armistice Army (Vichy Army), one of the fewest units chosen.

==== 1942 ====
The 8th Dragoons were disbanded once again after the Germans invaded Vichy France, bringing an end to the German puppet state.

==== 1944 ====
After the liberation of France, the 8th Dragoons were recreated, merged with the 1st Spahi Regiment, battering German forces in Alsace and in Germany until German surrender in May. By that time the 8th Dragoons were stationed at Lake Constance, and were awarded the Croix de Guerre.

=== 1945 to present ===
Following World War II, the 8th Dragoons garrisoned the City of Poitiers, then was sent in 1952 to Saarburg, shortly becoming part of the French occupation force in Germany. In 1956, the 8th Dragoons would participate in their last military operation in the Suez Canal, following the Suez Crisis. In 1964, the 8th Dragoons joined the 4th Hussar Regiment, and were stationed in Morhange Barracks where they would be dissolved in 1977.

== Garrisons ==
- Abbeville (1869)
- Meaux (1887– 1893)
- Lunéville (1894– 1914)
- Vitry-le-François (1914)
- Lunéville (1919– 1942) *Remnants were kept there until the Germans get to disarm them*
- Alsace and Germany (1944– 1946) *Oppose German forces as they were pushed back farther into Germany
- Poitiers (1946– 1952)
- Saarburg (1952– 1964)
- Morhange (1964– 1977)

== Marquis de camp, regimental colonels, commanders, and lieutenant colonels ==
=== Old Regime/Ancien Régime ===
Title: Marquis de Camp

- Michel Sublet Marquis d'Heudicourt (1674)
- Jean Baptiste Gaston de Choiseul, Count of Hostel and marquis de Praslin (1688)
- Count of Souternon (1693)
- Count of Gacé (1702)
- Count d'Agenois (1706)
- Marquis d'Estournel (1714)
- Marquis d'Hautefort d'Ajat (1734)
- Marquis de Crenay, Count of Montaigu (1736)
- Viscount of Castellane-Novéjean (1748)
- Count of Saluces (1753)
- Michel Louis Marie marquis de Beuzeville (1770)
- Conrad-Adolphe-Louis de Lardenois de Ville (1773)
- Jean Baptiste Gaston de Choiseul (1779)
- Jean, comte du Authier (1788- 1790)

=== Officers of the Revolutionary Army ===
Colonel Generals:

- François Bouzet de Montjoye (1791)
- Jean Thomas Scelles (1792)
- Charles Hubert (1793)
- Jean Louis Falque (1794)
- Jacques Louis François Milet (1797)
- Louis Jean Nicolas Abbot (1798)

=== Napoleonic officers ===
- Louis Beckler (1800– 1806)
- Alexandre Louis Robert (1806– 1811)
- Alexandre Lebrun (1811)
- Charles Joseph Hatry (1813)
- Eugène-Gabriel (1814)
- Charles François Martigue (1815)

=== Bourbon Restorationists ===
- Pierre-Jacques (1823)
- Jean-Alexandre Le Pays de Bourjolly (1835– 1839)

=== French Republicans ===
Colonels:

- Xavier de Lagoutte (1865– 1869)

==== World War I ====
- Louis Conneau (1907) *Temporary command*

==== World War II ====
- Léon Cuny (1939– 1940)
- Commander Kuntz (5/15/1940- 5/26/1940)*Regiment formally disbanded*

==== Vichy France ====
- Olleris (1940– 1941) *Regiment reformed as part of Vichy Army. Disbanded again once Vichy France collapsed*

=== 1945– 1977 ===
- Simon Y. (1955)
- Paramelle (1963)
- Mercier (1964)
- Colomb (1966)
- Perier (1968)
- Delmotte (1970)
- Perrey (1972)
- Mialet (1974)
- Lieutenant Colonel Georges Delclève (1976– 1977) *Regiment dismissed from service*

== Notable personnel from the regiment ==
- Antoine Rémy, a Knight and Baron of the 1st French Empire. Later allied to Louis XVIII. (Joined in 1783)
- Louis Jean Nicolas Abbot, a Major General of the Empire, and was Captain of the 8th Dragoon Regiment in 1798.
- Charles-Marie de MacMahon, second Lieutenant of the 8th Dragoons, heir to the MacMahon family. (Joined in 1877)
- Yves Guellec, a brigadier in the 8th Dragoons, soon made his name famous in World War II. (Joined in 1932)
- Bernard Chevignard, awarded the Companion of the Liberation decoration for his service in World War II. (Joined in 1933)

== Traditions and uniforms ==
Penthièvre Cavalry and Dragoons (1740- 1776) (1776- 1786)

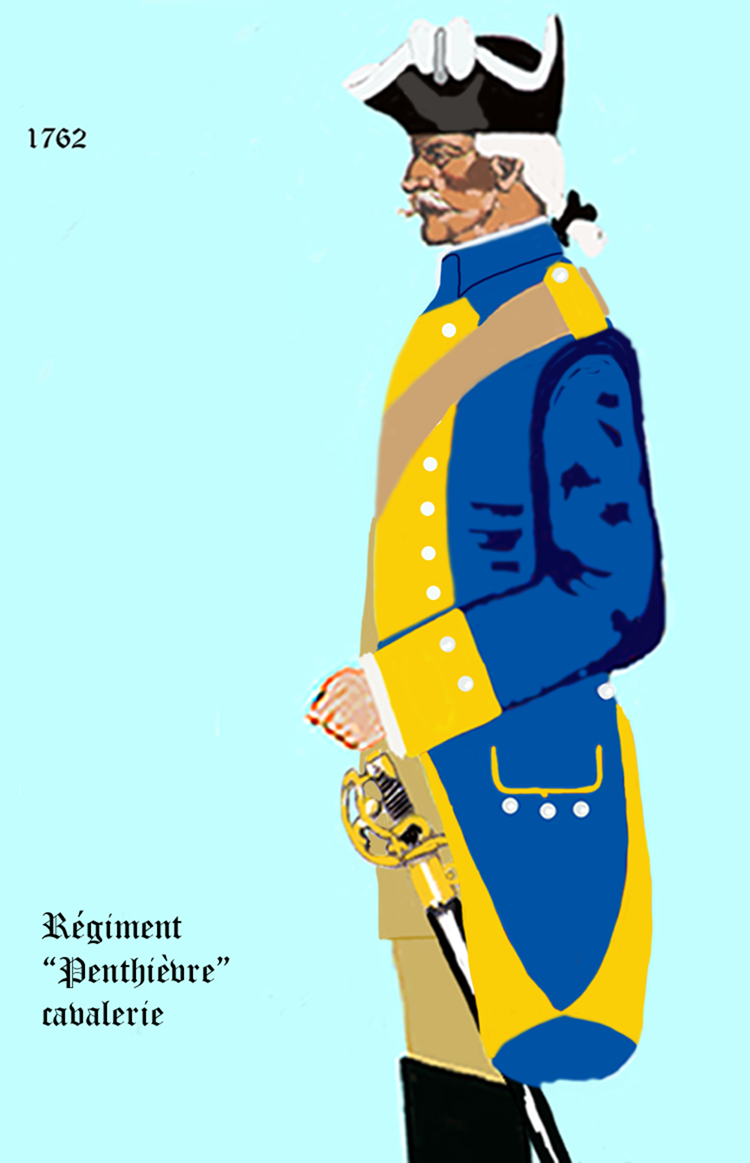
Uniform of the Penthièvre Cavalry from 1762 to 1767

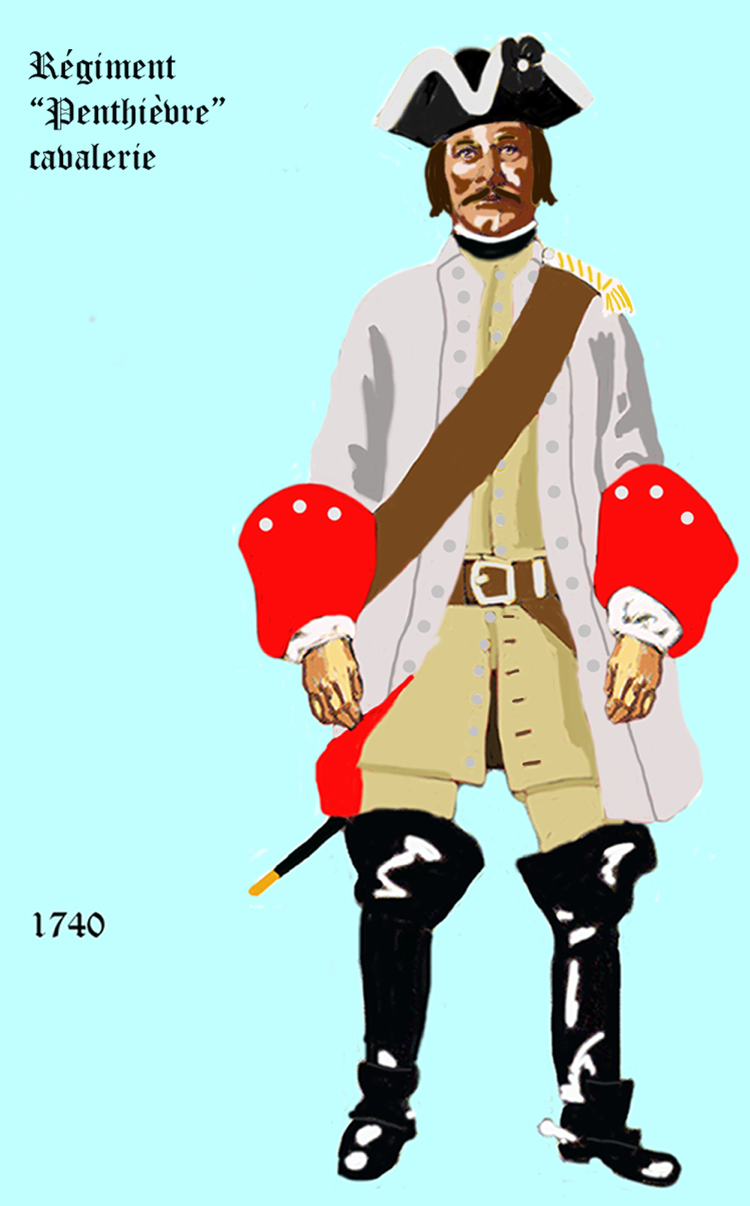
Uniform of the Penthièvre Cavalry from 1740 to 1757

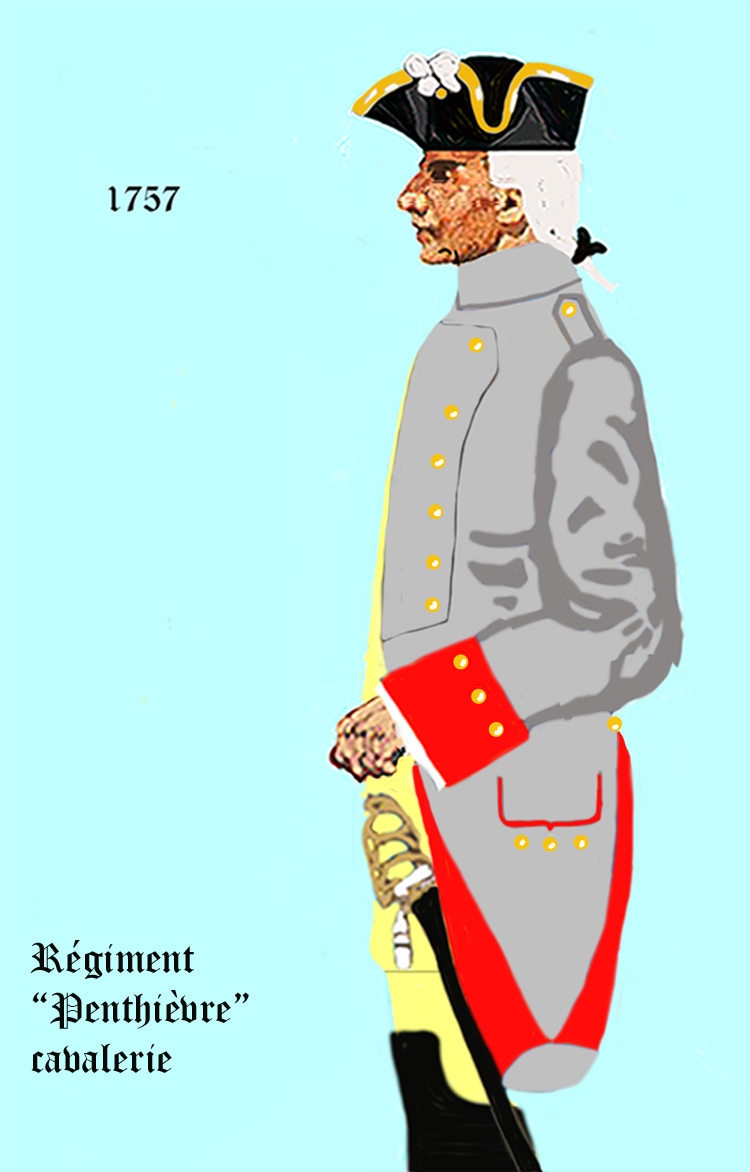
Uniform of the Penthièvre Cavalry from 1757 to 1762

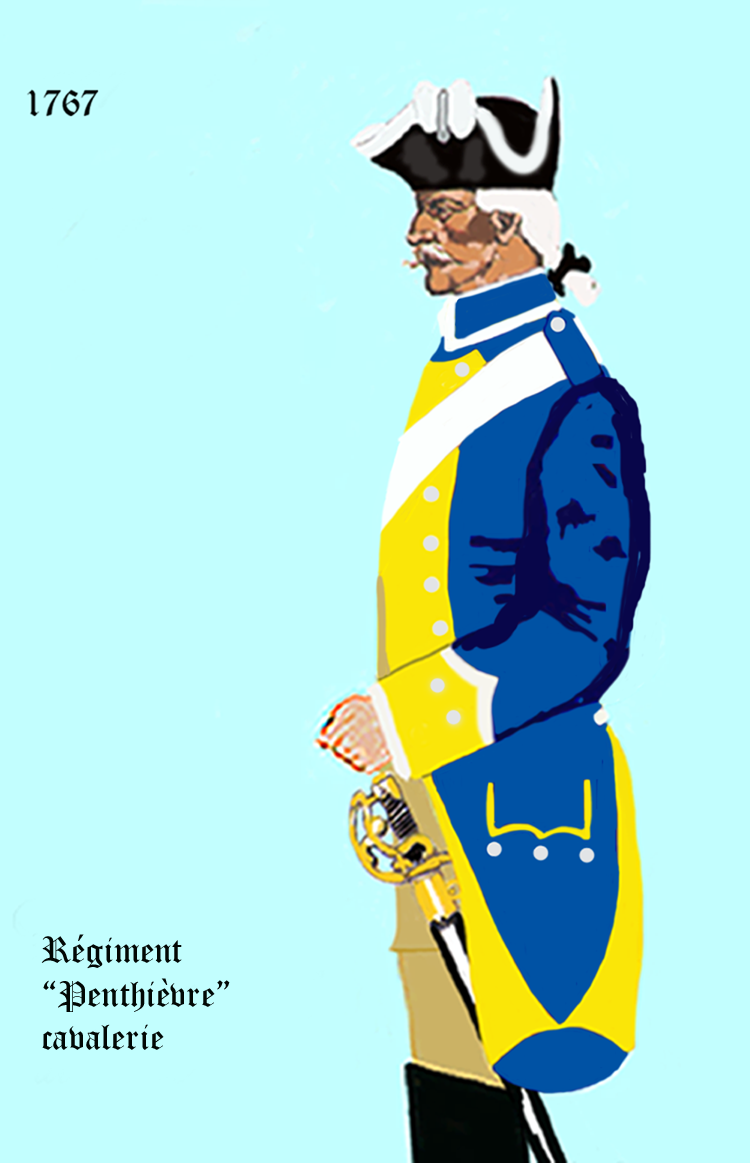
Uniform of the Penthièvre Cavalry from 1767 to 1776

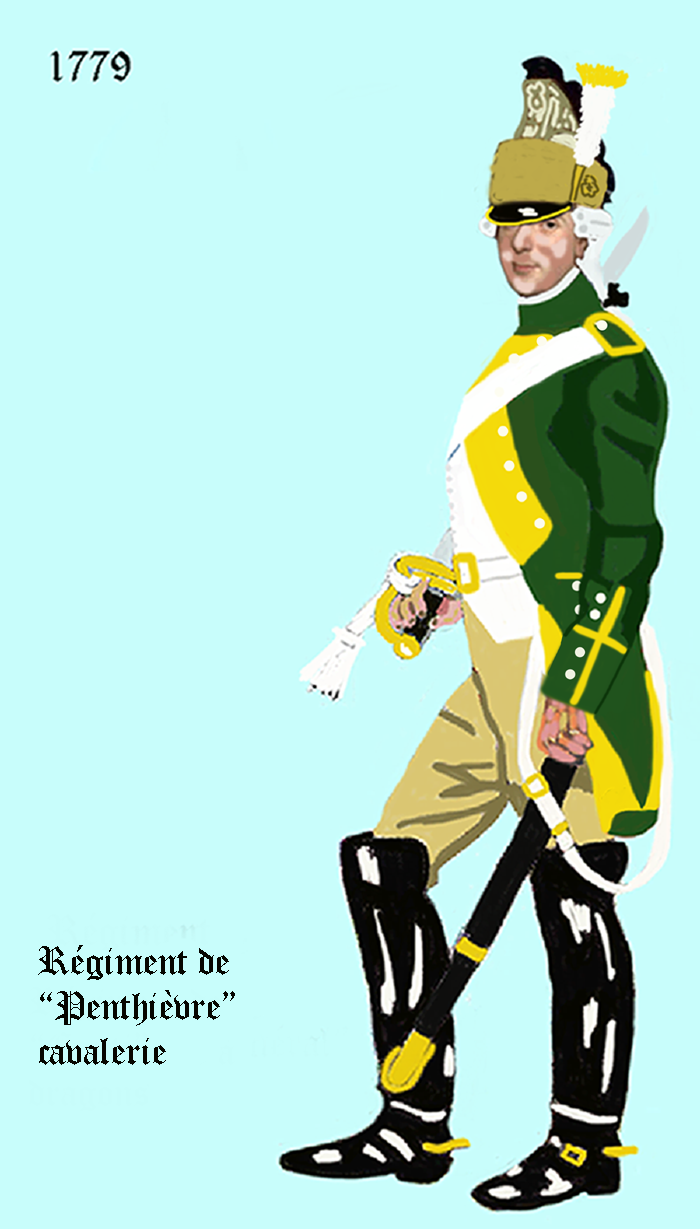
Uniform of the Penthièvre Dragoons from 1779- 1786

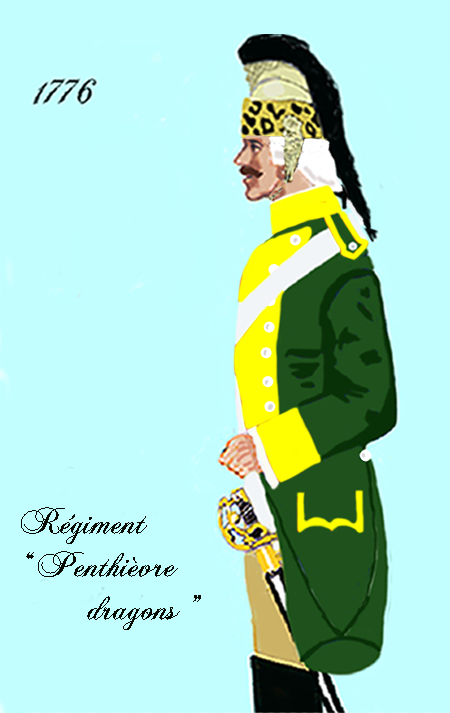
Uniform of the Penthièvre Dragoons from 1776- 1779
Revolutionary and Napoleonic uniforms (1786- 1791)

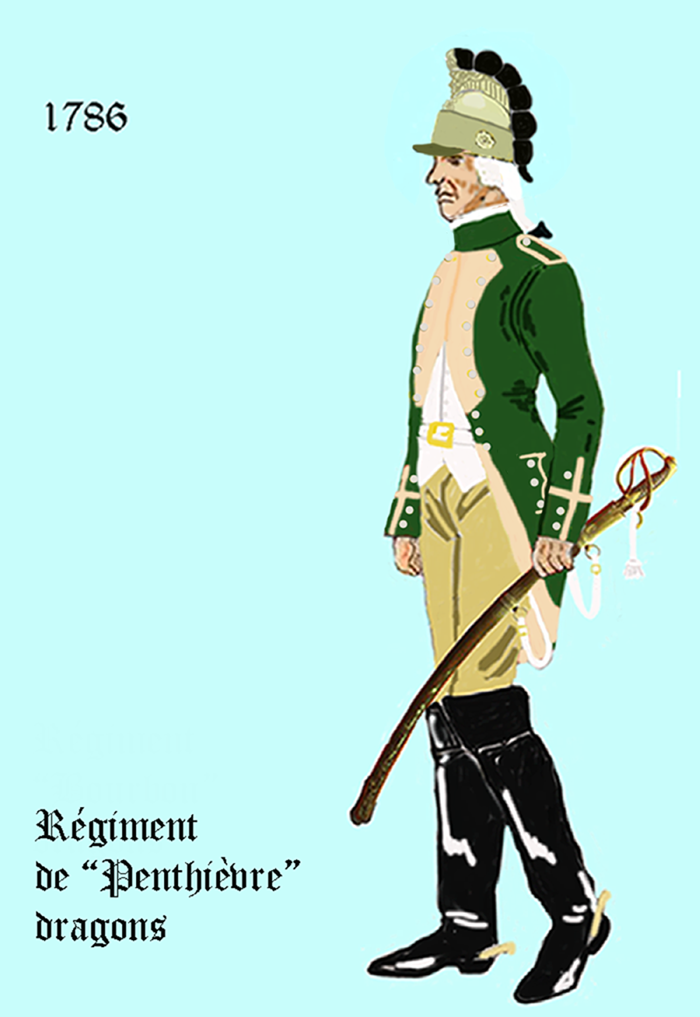
Uniform of the 8th Dragoons (Cavalry) from 1786- 1791

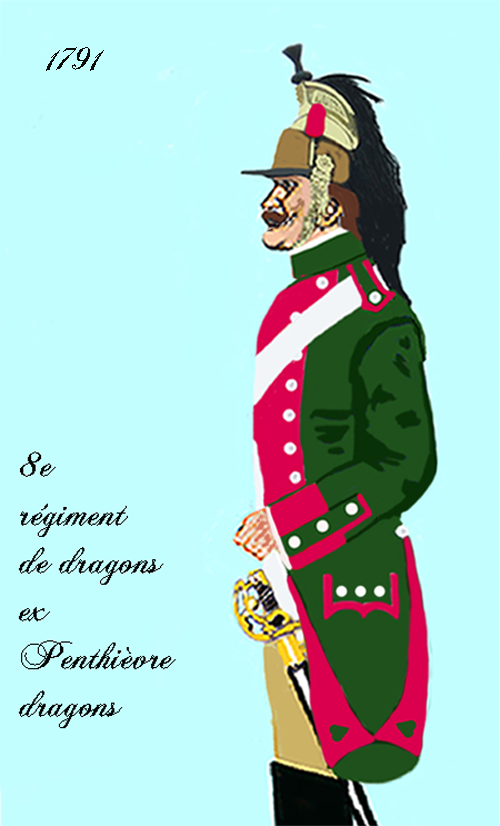
Uniform of the 8th Dragoons after 1791

=== Standards ===
==== Old Regime ====
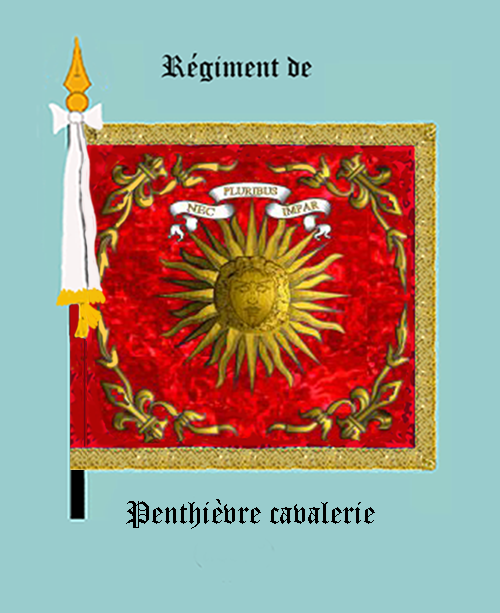
Standard of the Penthièvre Regiment (1737)

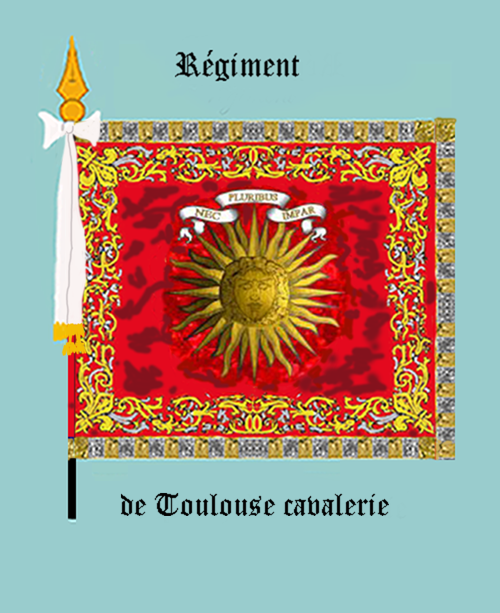
Standard of the Toulouse Regiment (1693)

==== 1945– present ====
The modern standard of the 8th Dragoons have the following words sewed into it.

- Rivoli 1797
- Marengo 1800
- Austerlitz 1805
- Heilsburg 1807
- La Mortagne 1914
- Flanders 1918
- L'Aisne 1918

=== Decorations ===
==== Badges/heraldry ====
In 1953, the official Regimental badge of the 8th Dragoon Regiment was a shield from the Ancien Régime with the coat of arms of the Bourbon Penthièvre family, of which the regiment was first named after, placed on an anchor. Above will be a Flory Crown, and below will spell in English, Dragon- Penthièvre. The badge can be seen at the start of this page.

The tie of the honor awards are decorated:

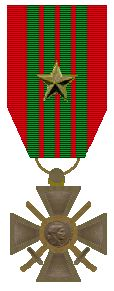
1939– 1945 War cross with a silver star.

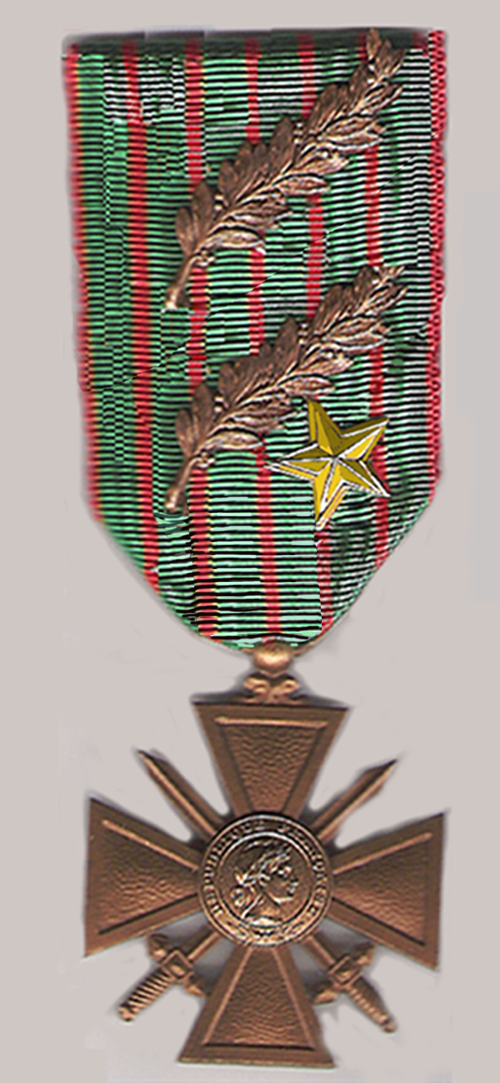
1914– 1918 War Cross with two palm leaves and a vermeil star.

==== Motto ====
"Which rubs against the pricks itself." −1972

"And of the land and sea." −1977–present motto
