= Army of the Rhine (1870) =

Armée du Rhin (Army of the Rhine)
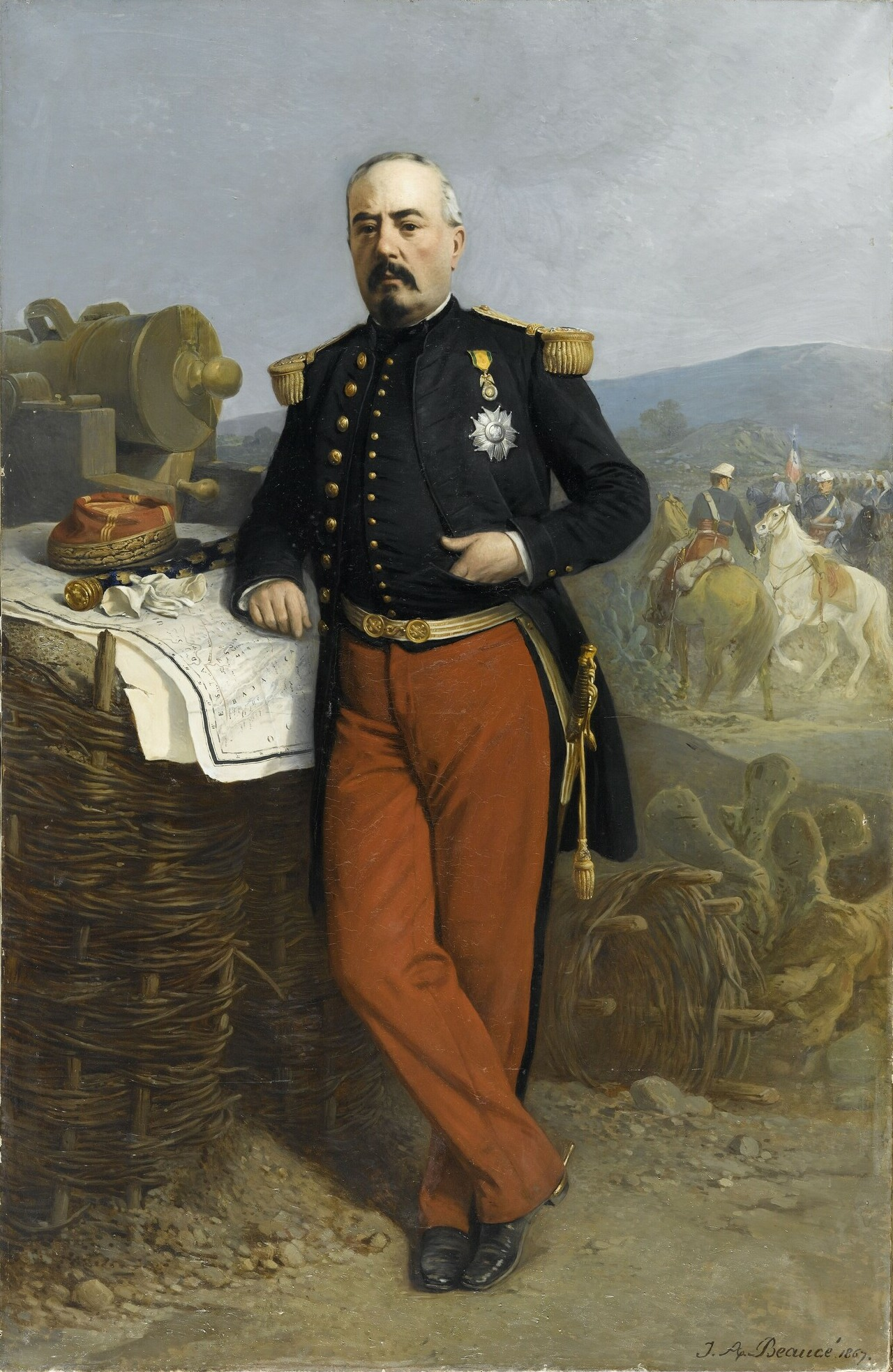
- Commander of the Army, Maréchal Bazaine
- Active: 1870
- Country: France
- Allegiance: Second French Empire
- Branch: French Army
- Engagements: Franco-Prussian War

Commanders
- Notable commanders: Maréchal de France Bazaine

The Army of the Rhine (French: Armée du Rhin) was a French military unit that fought in the Franco-Prussian War. It was created after the declaration of war on July 18 1870.

The unit participated in combats in Lorraine, then divided to form a second army, the Army of Châlons.

The Army of the Rhine surrendered on 27 October at the Siege of Metz.

== Creation of the unit ==
The Army of the Rhine was the first French Army constituted after the declaration of war, formed from the available troops during peacetime. Initially commanded by the Emperor Napoleon III, the Army included the Imperial Guard (French: La Garde Impériale), 7 Army Corps and a general reserve. Each Army Corps was constituted of 3 or 4 infantry division and 1 cavalry division made up of 2 or 3 brigades each, one artillery reserve and one engineer reserve. Each brigade counted 2 or 3 line infantry or line cavalry regiments.

The infantry divisions included an artillery component with 2 batteries de canons de 4 and 1 de mitrailleuse, while the cavalry divisions constituted 2 batteries horse mounted.

Formation of the army corps:

- The Imperial Guard of the Second Empire (French: Garde Impériale du Second Empire), with commander, général Bourbaki, garrisoned in Paris in times of peace. The Imperial Guard reached Metz on July 28 and the Guard reserves on the 30.
- The 1st Army Corps (French: 1^{er} Corps d'Armée), commanded by Maréchal de France Patrice de Mac Mahon, Duc de Magenta was formed in principle by troops from Algeria and the regiments of Eastern France. This Army Corps activated on August 1, 1870. Its initial role was to cover the Alsace.
- The 2nd Army Corps (French: 2^{e} Corps d'Armée) was consisted of troops of the Camp de Châlons, commanded by Frossard, aide de camp of the Emperor. These units made their way to Saint-Avold and Forbach.
- The 3rd Army Corps (French: 3^{e} Corps d'Armée) was formed by troops from Paris, Metz and Nancy. Commanded by Marshal François Achille Bazaine until August 12, then général Decaen killed at Borny (August 12 to 14) and finally commanded by Marshal Le Bœuf.
- The 4th Army Corps (French: 4^{e} Corps d'Armée), formed at Thionville on July 23 from the garrisons of the north and north-east, commanded by général de Ladmirault.
- The 5th Army Corps (French: 5^{e} Corps d'Armée), formed with the Army of Lyon, commanded by general de Failly. This Army Corps assembled in the regions of Bitche and Haguenau.
- The 6th Army Corps (French: 6^{e} Corps d'Armée) of Marshal François Certain de Canrobert consisted of troops from Paris, Châlons, and Soissons and assembled at the camp de Châlons.
- The 7th Army Corps (French: 7^{e} Corps d'Armée) had difficulty assembling due to its units being widely dispersed. Troops of the Army Corps hailed from the south-east, Clermont-Ferrand, Perpignan, Civitavecchia and had to make their way to Colmar and Belfort. This Army Corps was commanded by général Douay.
- The general Cavalry Reserve was supposed to be formed initially of 3 divisions with 2 brigades each. However, only 2 divisions were available as the 1st Division was employed to reinforce the Army of Châlons as the cavalry of the 6th Corps.
- The general Artillery Reserve, commanded by général Canu, formed at Nancy and made its way to Metz.
- The general Engineer Reserve was commanded by colonel Rémond.

Strength of the Army of the Rhine
| | Date | Officers | Men | Horses | Battalions | Squadrons | Batteries | Cie Engineer |
|---|---|---|---|---|---|---|---|---|
| Imperial Guard | July 30 | 1,047 | 21,028 | 7,304 | 24 | 30 | 12 | 3 |
| 1st Army Corps | August 1 | 1,651 | 40,165 | 8,143 | 52 | 26 | 20 | 5,5 |
| 2nd Army Corps | August 1 | 1,172 | 27,956 | 5,016 | 39 | 18 | 13 | 4 |
| 3rd Army Corps | August 6 | 1,704 | 41,574 | 9,810 | 52 | 31 | 20 | 5,5 |
| 4th Army Corps | August 13 | 1,208 | 27,702 | 5,536 | 39 | 18 | 15 | 4 |
| 5th Army Corps | August 1 | 1,174 | 20,243 | 5,527 | 52 | 31 | 20 | 5,5 |
| 6th Army Corps | August 1 | 1,474 | 33,946 | 5,534 | - | - | - | - |
| 7th Army Corps | August 1 | 1,043 | 23,142 | 5,396 | - | - | - | - |
| Cavalry Reserve | August 1 | 464 | 6,360 | 6,321 | - | - | - | - |
| Artillery Reserve | August 9 | 87 | 2,675 | 2,725 | - | - | - | - |
| Engineer Reserve | - | 13 | 459 | 196 | - | - | - | 4 |

== Composition and order of battle ==
On August 1, 1870, the Army of the Rhine was constituted of seven Army Corps and of artillery and reserve cavalry. Lieutenant-colonel Rousset tendered an estimative decomposition by grand units:

=== Commandement and état-major ===
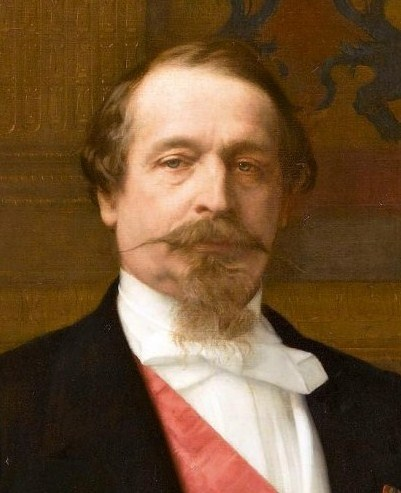
Napoleon III, first commander-in-chief of the Army of the Rhin.

- Commander-in-Chief : Napoléon III
- Major General : maréchal Le Bœuf
- Aides-major generals :
  - général Lebrun
  - général Hugues Louis Jarras
- Artillery Commander : général Marie Justin Lin Soleille (also known as général Justin Soleille)
- Engineer Commander : général Coffinières de Nordeck
- Intendant of the Army : général Wolff
- Medical Chief of the Army : baron Larrey

=== The Imperial Guard ===
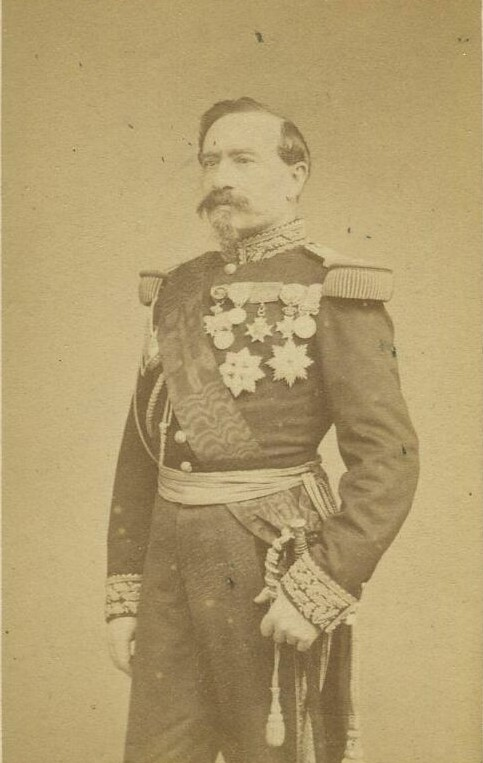
Général Bourbaki, commander of the Imperial Guard.

1st Infantry Division (voltigeurs)

The 1st Infantry Division of the Imperial Guard (French: La Garde Impériale) was commanded by général Deligny

- 1st Brigade of général Brincourt
  - Imperial Guard Chasseur Battalion (French: Chasseurs de la Garde Impériale) (commandant Dufaure du Bessol)
  - Imperial Guard 1st Voltigeurs Regiment (French: 1^{er} Régiment de Voltigeurs de la Garde Impériale) (colonel Dumont)
  - Imperial Guard 2nd Voltigeurs Regiment (French: 2^{e} Régiment de Voltigeurs de la Garde Impériale) (colonel Désiré Camille Jean Peychaud)
- 2nd Brigade of général Garnier
  - Imperial Guard 3rd Voltigeurs Regiment (French: 3^{e} Régiment de Voltigeurs de la Garde Impériale) (colonel Jules Pierre Joseph Lian)
  - Imperial Guard 4th Voltigeurs Regiment (French: 4^{e} Régiment de Voltigeurs de la Garde Impériale) (colonel Jean-Baptiste Xavier Bonaventure Ponsard)
- 3 Artillery Batteries (2 batteries de 4 and 1 de mitrailleuses) and 1 Engineer Company

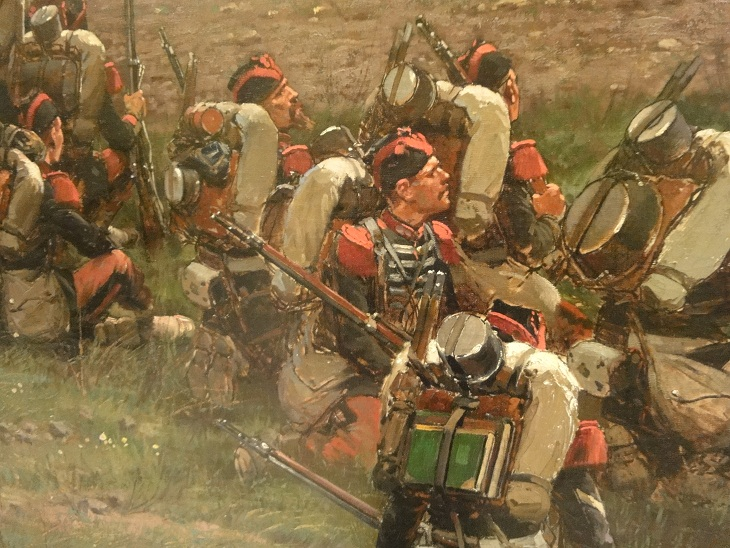
Detachment of the grenadiers of the Imperial Guard at Rezonville (painting of Édouard Detaille - 1870).

2nd Infantry Division (Grenadiers)

The 2nd Infantry Division of the Imperial Guard was commanded by général Picard

- 1st Brigade of général Jeanningros
  - Imperial Guard Zouaves Regiment (French: Régiment de zouaves de la Garde Impériale) (colonel Jean-Baptiste Joseph Giraud)
  - Imperial Guard 1st Grenadier Regiment (French: 1^{er} Régiment de Grenadiers de la Garde Impériale) (colonel Georges Hippolyte Théologue)
- 2nd Brigade of général Le Poittevin de La Croix-Vaubois
  - Imperial Guard 2nd Grenadier Regiment (French: 2^{e} Régiment de Grenadiers de la Garde Impériale) (colonel Lecointe)
  - Imperial Guard 3rd Grenadier Regiment (French: 3^{e} Régiment de Grenadiers de la Garde Impériale) (colonel Louis Cousin)
- 3 Artillery Batteries (2 batteries de 4 and 1 de mitrailleuses) and 1 Engineer Company

Cavalry Division

The Cavalry Division of the Imperial Guard was commanded by général Nicolas Gilles Toussaint Desvaux

- 1st Brigade of général Joseph Charles Halna du Frétay
  - Guides Regiment (French: Régiment de guides) (colonel Frédéric de Percin Northumberland)
  - Chasseurs Regiment (French: Régiment de chasseurs) (colonel Antoine Louis Claude de Montarby)
- 2nd Brigade of général Jean Alexandre Ernest de France
  - Lancers Regiment (French: Régiment de lanciers) (colonel Henri Jean-Baptiste de Latheulade)
  - Dragoon Regiment of the Empress (French: Régiment de dragons de l'Impératrice) (colonel Simon Antoine Eugène Sautereau-Dupart)
- 3rd Brigade of général du Preuil
  - Cuirassiers Regiment (French: Régiment de cuirassiers) (colonel Charles François Antoine Dupressoir)
  - Carabiniers Regiment of the Imperial Guard (French: Régiment de carabiniers de la Garde Impériale) (colonel Louis Jean Edmond Petit)
- 2 Artillery Batteries de 4 horse mounted

Reserve Artillery (colonel Félix François Louis Clappier)

- 4 Artillery Batteries de 4 horse mounted
- 1 Train equipped Squadron

Parc Artillery (colonel Elie Jean de Vassoigne)

Total artillery

- 24 Battalions, 24 Squadrons, 72 pieces out of which 12 mitrailleuses, 2 Engineer Companies, 1 Train Squadron

=== 1st Army Corps ===
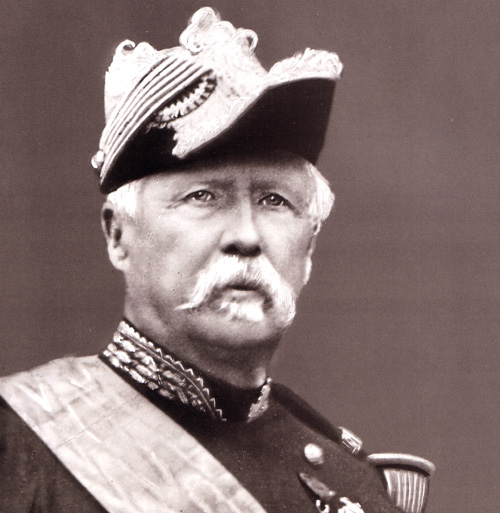
Marshal de Mac Mahon, commander of the 1st Army Corps.

The 1st Army Corps (French: 1^{er} Corps d'Armée) was commanded by Patrice de MacMahon, Duke of Magenta, with chef d'état-major général Colson. Général Ducrot, former commander of the 1st Division, succeeded Marshal Mac Mahon who recently assumed command of the Army of Châlons. Général Philippe Antoine Justin Joly Frigola commanded the artillery.

1st Infantry Division

The 1st Infantry Division of the 1st Army Corps was under the orders of général Ducrot

- 1st Brigade of général Wolff
  - 18th Infantry Regiment (French: 18^{e} Régiment d'Infanterie de Ligne) (colonel Alexis Evariste Appolinie Bréger)
  - 96th Infantry Regiment (French: 96^{e} Régiment d'Infanterie de Ligne) (colonel Ernest de Franchessin)
  - 13th Chasseurs Battalion (French: 13^{e} Bataillon de Chasseurs à Pied) (commandant Alfred Jules Adrien Le Cacher de Bonneville)
- 2nd Brigade of général Louis Jules de Postis du Houlbec
  - 45th Line Infantry Regiment (French: 45^{e} Régiment d'Infanterie de Ligne) (colonel René Ludovic Bertrand)
  - 1st Zouaves Regiment (French: 1^{er} Régiment de Zouaves) (colonel Simon Hubert Carteret-Trecourt)
- 3 Artillery Batteries (2 batteries de 4 and 1 de mitrailleuses) and 1 Engineer Company

2nd Infantry Division

The 2nd Infantry Division of the 1st Army Corps was under the orders of général Douay

- 1st Brigade of général Pelletier de Montmarie
  - 50th Infantry Regiment (French: 50^{e} Régiment d'Infanterie de Ligne) (colonel Jules César Ardoin)
  - 74th Infantry Regiment (French: 74^{e} Régiment d'Infanterie de Ligne) (colonel François Adolphe Theuvez)
  - 16e Bataillon de Chasseurs à Pied (French: 16^{e} Bataillon de Chasseurs à Pied) (commandant Anne Louis François Armand d'Hugues)
- 2nd Brigade of général Pellé
  - 78th Infantry Regiment (French: 78^{e} Régiment d'Infanterie de Ligne) (colonel de Bellemare )
  - 1st Algerian Tirailleurs Regiment (French: 1^{er} Régiment de Tirailleurs Algériens) (colonel Jacques Louis de Morandy)
  - 1st Marching Regiment (French: 1^{er} Régiment de Marche) (colonel Lecomte, 3 Battalions)
- 3 Artillery Batteries (2 batteries de 4 and 1 de mitrailleuses) and 1 Engineer Company

3rd Infantry Division

The 3rd Infantry Division of the 1st Army Corps was under the orders of général Raoult

- 1st Brigade of général Edmond Aimable L'Hériller
  - 36th Infantry Regiment (French: 36^{e} Régiment d'Infanterie de Ligne) (colonel Louis Eugène Krien)
  - 2nd Zouaves Regiment (French: 2^{e} Régiment de Zouaves) (colonel Détrie)
  - 8e Bataillon de Chasseurs à Pied (French: 8^{e} Bataillon de Chasseurs à Pied) (commandant André Léon Poyet)
- 2nd Brigade of général Henri Louis Nicolas Lefebvre
  - 48th Infantry Regiment (French: 48^{e} Régiment d'Infanterie de Ligne) (colonel Louis Adolphe Rogier)
  - 2nd Algerian Tirailleurs Regiment (French: 2^{e} Régiment de Tirailleurs Algériens) (colonel Pierre François Jean Raphaël Suzzoni)
- 3 Artillery Batteries (2 batteries de 4 and 1 de mitrailleuses) and 1 Engineer Company

4th Infantry Division

The 4th Infantry Division of the 1st Army Corps was under the orders of général Marie-Hippolyte de Lartigue de Goueytes

- 1st Brigade under the orders of général Joseph Henri Fortuné Fraboulet de Kerléadec
  - 56th Infantry Regiment (French: 56^{e} Régiment d'Infanterie de Ligne) (colonel Jean-Louis Ména)
  - 3rd Zouaves Regiment (French: 3^{e} Régiment de Zouaves) (colonel Louis Alfred Bocher)
  - 1er Bataillon de Chasseurs à Pied (French: 1^{er} bataillon de chasseurs à pied) (commandant François Achille Bureau)
- 2nd Brigade under the orders of général Lacretelle
  - 87th Infantry Regiment (French: 87^{e} Régiment d'Infanterie de Ligne) (colonel Omer Arsène André Blot)
  - 3rd Algerian Tirailleurs Regiment (French: 3^{e} Régiment de Tirailleurs Algériens) (colonel Fabien Pierre Edmond Gandil)
- 3 Artillery Batteries (2 batteries de 4 and 1 de mitrailleuses) and 1 Engineer Company

Cavalry Division

The Cavalry Division of the 1st Army Corps was commanded by général Duhesme

- 1st Brigade of général de Achille Armand de Laroche-Tourteau de Septeuil
  - 3rd Hussards Regiment (French: 3^{e} Régiment de Hussards) (colonel de Vieil)
  - 11e Régiment de Chasseurs à Cheval (French: 11^{e} Régiment de Chasseurs à Cheval) (colonel Élisabeth Jean Hyacinthe Dominique Dastugue)
- 2nd Brigade of général de Nansouty
  - 2nd Lancers Regiment (French: 2^{e} Régiment de Lanciers) (colonel Charles Marie Poissonnier)
  - 6th Lancers Regiment (French: 6^{e} Régiment de Lanciers) (colonel Joseph Élie Tripart)
  - 10th Dragoon Regiment (French: 10^{e} Régiment de Dragons) (colonel Félix Théodule Perrot)
- 3rd Brigade of général Alexandre Ernest Michel
  - 8th Cuirassiers Regiment (French: 8^{e} Régiments de Cuirassiers) (colonel Guiot de la Rochère)
  - 9th Cuirassiers Regiment (French: 9^{e} Régiments de Cuirassiers) (colonel Aimé Louis Waternau)

Reserve Artillery

Artillery Reserve was under the orders of colonel Jean Louis de Vassart d'Andernay

- 2 Artillery Batteries de 12
- 2 Artillery Batteries de 4 mounted
- 2 Artillery Batteries de 4 horse mounted
- Parc Artillery, Reserve and Parc Engineer

=== 2nd Army Corps ===
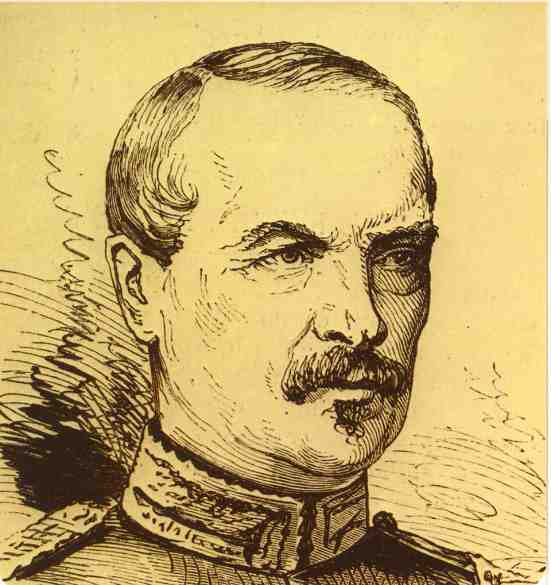
Général Frossard, commander of the 2nd Army Corps.

The 2nd Army Corps (French: 2^{e} Corps d'Armée) was commanded by général Frossard, with chef d'état-major général Eugène Saget.

1st Infantry Division

The 1st Infantry Division of the 2nd Army Corps was under the orders of général Vergé

- 1st Brigade of général Letellier-Valazé
  - 32nd Infantry Regiment (French: 32^{e} Régiment d'Infanterie de Ligne) (colonel Hilarion Adrien Léonard Frédéric Merle)
  - 55th Infantry Regiment (French: 55^{e} Régiment d'Infanterie de Ligne) (colonel de Waldner de Freundstein)
  - 3e Bataillon de Chasseurs à Pied (French: 3^{e} Bataillon de Chasseurs à Pied) (commandant Claude Thoma)
- 2nd Brigade of Charles Jean Jolivet
  - 76th Infantry Regiment (French: 76^{e} Régiment d'Infanterie de Ligne) (colonel Pierre François Alphonse Brice)
  - 77th Infantry Regiment (French: 77^{e} Régiment d'Infanterie de Ligne) (colonel Février)
- 3 Artillery Batteries (2 batteries de 4 and 1 de mitrailleuses) and 1 Engineer Company

2nd Infantry Division

The 2nd Infantry Division of the 2nd Army Corps was under the orders of général Bataille

- 1st Brigade of général Gaspard Émile Pierre Balthazard Pouget
  - 8th Infantry Regiment (French: 8^{e} Régiment d'Infanterie de Ligne) (colonel François Auguste Florimond Haca)
  - 23rd Infantry Regiment (French: 23^{e} Régiment d'Infanterie de Ligne) (colonel Charles Élie Rolland)
  - 12e Bataillon de Chasseurs à Pied (French: 12^{e} Bataillon de Chasseurs à Pied) (commandant Louis Édouard Jouanne-Beaulieu)
- 2nd Brigade of général Jacques Alexandre Jules Fauvart-Bastoul
  - 66th Infantry Regiment (French: 66^{e} Régiment d'Infanterie de Ligne) (colonel Charles François Ameller)
  - 67th Infantry Regiment (French: 67^{e} Régiment d'Infanterie de Ligne) (colonel Mangin)
- 3 Artillery Batteries (2 batteries de 4 and 1 de mitrailleuses) and 1 Engineer Company

3rd Infantry Division

The 3rd Infantry Division of the 2nd Army Corps was under the orders of général de Laveaucoupet

- 1st Brigade of général Augustin Alexis Doëns
  - 2nd Infantry Regiment (French: 2^{e} Régiment d'Infanterie de Ligne) (colonel Saint-Hillier)
  - 63rd Infantry Regiment (French: 63^{e} Régiment d'Infanterie de Ligne) (colonel Louis Adolphe Zentz)
  - 10e Bataillon de Chasseurs à Pied (French: 10^{e} Bataillon de Chasseurs à Pied) (commandant Schenk)
- 2nd Brigade of général Charles Micheler
  - 24th Infantry Regiment (French: 24^{e} Régiment d'Infanterie de Ligne) (colonel Charles Louis Auguste d'Arguesse)
  - 40th Infantry Regiment (French: 40^{e} Régiment d'Infanterie de Ligne) (colonel Jean-Baptiste Vittot)
- 3 Artillery Batteries (2 batteries de 4 and 1 de mitrailleuses) and 1 Engineer Company

Cavalry Division

The Cavalry Division of the 2nd Army Corps was commanded by général Claude marie Hyacinthe Marmier

- 1st Brigade of général Paul de Valabrègue
  - 4e Régiment de Chasseurs à Cheval (French: 4^{e} Régiment de Chasseurs à Cheval) (colonel Arthur Gabriel Marie Claude du Ferron)
  - 5e Régiment de Chasseurs à Cheval (French: 5^{e} Régiment de Chasseurs à Cheval) (colonel Louis Frédéric Gombaud de Séréville)
- 2nd Brigade of général Bachelier
  - 7th Dragoon Regiment (French: 7^{e} Régiment de Dragons) (colonel Xavier Marie-Thérèse Eugène de Gressot)
  - 12th Dragoon Regiment (French: 12^{e} Régiment de Dragons) (colonel Nicolas de Bigault d'Avocourt)

Reserve Artillery

Artillery Reserve was under the orders of colonel Beaudoin

- 2 Artillery Batteries de 12
- 2 Artillery Batteries de 4 mounted
- 2 Artillery Batteries de 4 horse mounted
- Parc Artillery, Reserve and Parc Engineer

=== 3rd Army Corps ===
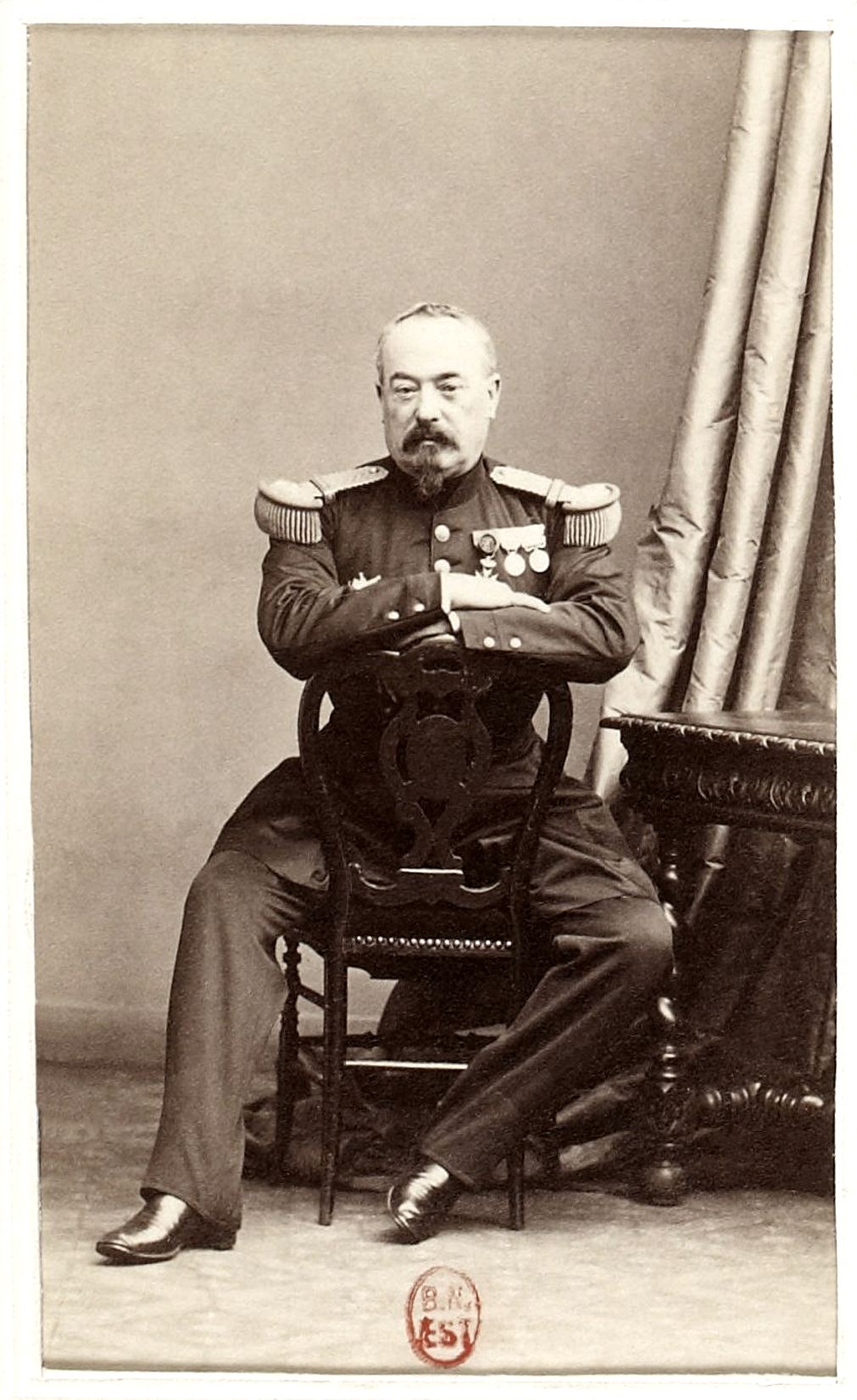
Marshal Bazaine, commander of the 3rd Army Corps.

The 3rd Army Corps (French: 3^{e} Corps d'Armée) was commanded by Marshal Bazaine, with chef d'état-major général Claude Jules Isidore Manèque.

1st Infantry Division

The 1st Infantry Division of the 3rd Army Corps was under the orders of Montaudon

- 1st Brigade of général baron Aymard
  - 51st Infantry Regiment (French: 51^{e} Régiment d'Infanterie de Ligne) (colonel Delebecque)
  - 62nd Infantry Regiment (French: 62^{e} Régiment d'Infanterie de Ligne) (colonel Joseph Alexis Dauphin)
  - 18e Bataillon de Chasseurs à Pied (French: 18^{e} Bataillon de Chasseurs à Pied) (commandant Charles Rigault)
- 2nd Brigade of général Clinchant
  - 81st Infantry Regiment (French: 81^{e} Régiment d'Infanterie de Ligne) (colonel Louis Antoine Auguste Collavier d'Albici)
  - 95th Infantry Regiment (French: 95^{e} Régiment d'Infanterie de Ligne) (colonel Davout d'Auerstaedt)
- 3 Artillery Batteries (2 batteries de 4 and 1 de mitrailleuses) and 1 Engineer Company

2nd Infantry Division

The 2nd Infantry Division of the 3rd Army Corps was under the orders of général de Castagny

- 1st Brigade of général baron Etienne Gabriel Edmond de Nayral
  - 19th Infantry Regiment (French: 19^{e} Régiment d'Infanterie de Ligne) (colonel Georges Alexis de Launay)
  - 41st Infantry Regiment (French: 41^{e} Régiment d'Infanterie de Ligne) (colonel Saussier)
  - 15e Bataillon de Chasseurs à Pied (French: 15^{e} Bataillon de Chasseurs à Pied) (commandant Henri Anne François Archibald Lafouge)
- 2nd Brigade of général Louis Médéric Georges Frédéric Henri Éloi Eugène Duplessis
  - 69th Infantry Regiment (French: 69^{e} Régiment d'Infanterie de Ligne) (colonel Aristide Amand Jean-Baptiste Le Tourneur)
  - 90th Infantry Regiment (French: 90^{e} Régiment d'Infanterie de Ligne) (colonel Philippe Marie Henri Roussel de Courcy)
- 3 Artillery Batteries (2 batteries de 4 and 1 de mitrailleuses) and 1 Engineer Company

3rd Infantry Division

The 3rd Infantry Division of the 3rd Army Corps was under the orders of général Jean-Louis Metman

- 1st Brigade of général Charles Marie Ferdinand Jacques de Potier
  - 7th Infantry Regiment (French: 7^{e} Régiment d'Infanterie de Ligne) (colonel Cotteret)
  - 29th Infantry Regiment (French: 29^{e} Régiment d'Infanterie de Ligne) (colonel Etienne Lalanne)
  - 7e Bataillon de Chasseurs à Pied (French: 7^{e} Bataillon de Chasseurs à Pied) (commandant Rigaud)
- 2nd Brigade of général Eugène Jean-Marie Arnaudeau
  - 59th Infantry Regiment (French: 59^{e} Régiment d'Infanterie de Ligne) (colonel Armand Lucien Duez)
  - 71st Infantry Regiment (French: 71^{e} Régiment d'Infanterie de Ligne) (colonel Louis Guillaume Joseph d'Audebard de Ferussac)
- 3 Artillery Batteries (2 batteries de 4 and 1 de mitrailleuses) and 1 Engineer Company

4th Infantry Division

The 4th Infantry Division of the 3rd Army Corps was under the orders of général Decaen then Aymard

- 1st Brigade of général de Brauer
  - 44th Infantry Regiment (French: 44^{e} Régiment d'Infanterie de Ligne) (colonel Joseph Polycarpe Fournier)
  - 60th Infantry Regiment (French: 60^{e} Régiment d'Infanterie de Ligne) (colonel Joseph Boissie)
  - 11e Bataillon de Chasseurs à Pied (French: 11^{e} Bataillon de Chasseurs à Pied) (commandant Charles Anatole de Paillot)
- 2nd Brigade of général François Eugène Sanglé-Ferrière
  - 80th Infantry Regiment (French: 80^{e} Régiment d'Infanterie de Ligne) (colonel Louis Henri Fulgence Janin)
  - 35th Infantry Regiment (French: 35^{e} Régiment d'Infanterie de Ligne) (colonel François Louis Plauchut)
- 3 Artillery Batteries (2 batteries de 4 and 1 de mitrailleuses) and 1 Engineer Company

Cavalry Division

The Cavalry Division of the 3rd Army Corps was commanded by général comte Charles Philippe Marie Antoine de Clérembault

- 1st Brigade of général Jean-Louis de Bruchard
  - 2e Régiment de Chasseurs à Cheval (French: 2^{e} Régiment de Chasseurs à Cheval) (colonel Edmé Charles Pelletier)
  - 3e Régiment de Chasseurs à Cheval (French: 3^{e} Régiment de Chasseurs à Cheval) (colonel Henri Philippe Robert Sanson de Sansal)
  - 10e Régiment de Chasseurs à Cheval (French: 10^{e} Régiment de Chasseurs à Cheval) (colonel Pierre Marie Léopold Nérin)
- 2nd Brigade of général Henri Louis Abel Gayault de Maubranches
  - 2nd Dragoon Regiment (French: 2^{e} Régiment de Dragons) (colonel Antoine Amédée Mercier du Paty de Clam)
  - 4th Dragoon Regiment (French: 4^{e} Régiment de Dragons) (colonel Augustin Victor Cassiodore Cornat)
- 3rd Brigade of général Jacques Louis Ange Eugène Bégougne de Juniac
  - 5th Dragoon Regiment (French: 5^{e} Régiment de Dragons) (colonel Jean-Baptiste Joseph Euchène)
  - 8th Dragoon Regiment (French: 8^{e} Régiment de Dragons) (colonel Ludovic de Boyer de Fonscolombe)

Reserve Artillery

Artillery Reserve was under the orders of colonel de Lajaille

- 2 Artillery Batteries de 12
- 2 Artillery Batteries de 4 mounted
- 2 Artillery Batteries de 4 horse mounted
- Parc Artillery, Reserve and Parc Engineer

=== 4th Army Corps ===
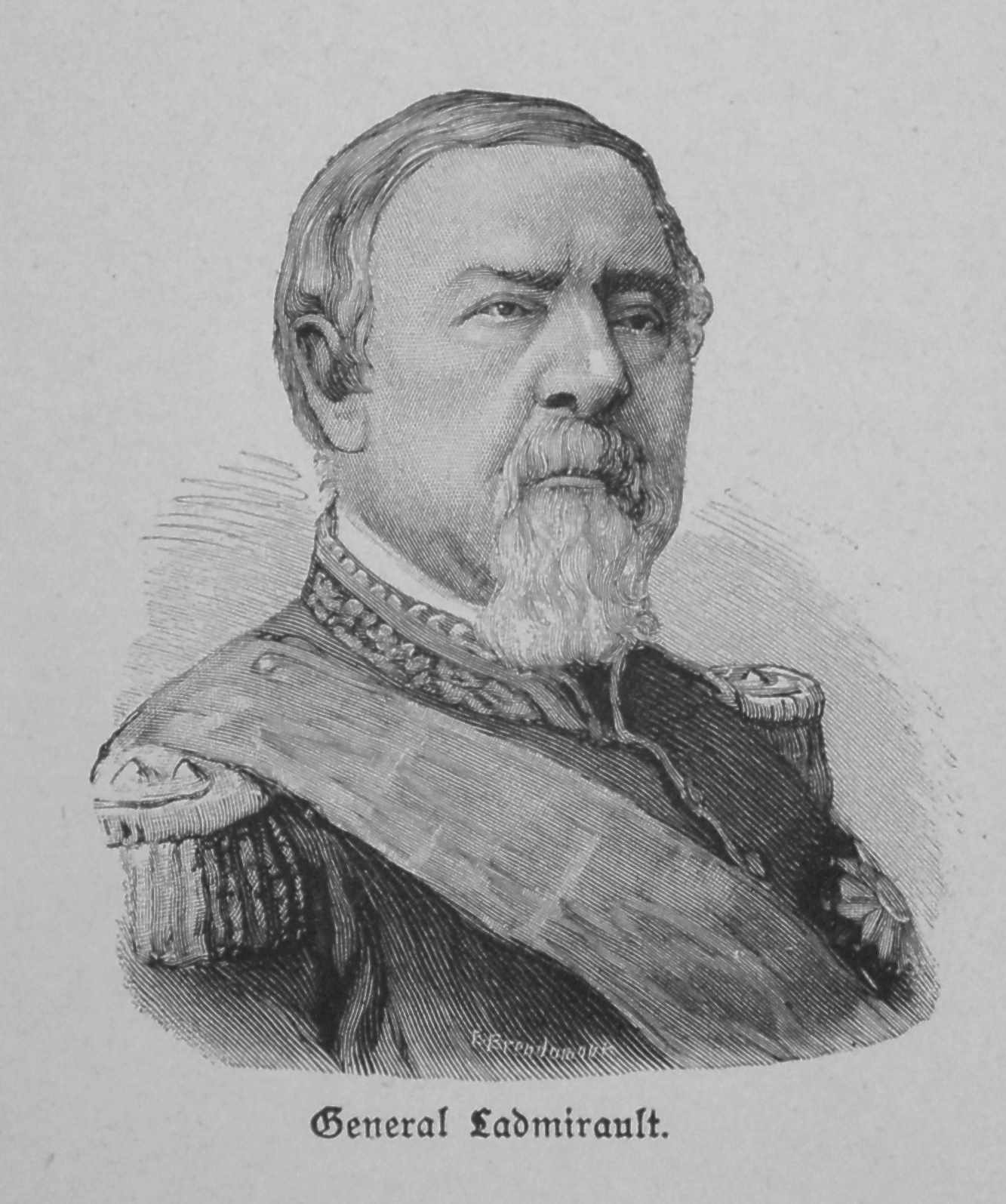
Général Ladmirault, commander of the 4th Army Corps.

The 4th Army Corps (French: 4^{e} Corps d'Armée) was commanded by général de Ladmirault, with chef d'état-major général Osmont.

1st Infantry Division

The 1st Infantry Division of the 4th Army Corps was under the orders of général Courtot de Cissey

- 1st Brigade of général comte Brayer
  - 1st Infantry Regiment (French: 1^{er} régiment d'infanterie de Ligne) (colonel Frémont)
  - 6th Infantry Regiment (French: 6^{e} Régiment d'Infanterie de Ligne) (colonel Labarthe)
  - 20e Bataillon de Chasseurs à Pied (French: 20^{e} Bataillon de Chasseurs à Pied) (commandant Augustin Marcel Maurice de Labarrière)
- 2nd Brigade of général de Golberg
  - 57th Infantry Regiment (French: 57^{e} Régiment d'Infanterie de Ligne) (colonel Giraud)
  - 73rd Infantry Regiment (French: 73^{e} Régiment d'Infanterie de Ligne) (colonel Supervielle)
- 3 Artillery Batteries (2 batteries de 4 et 1 de mitrailleuses) and 1 Engineer Company

2nd Infantry Division

The 2nd Infantry Division of the 4th Army Corps was under the orders of général Rose then Grenier

- 1st Brigade of général Véron dit Bellecourt
  - 13th Infantry Regiment (French: 13^{e} Régiment d'Infanterie de Ligne) (colonel Lion)
  - 43rd Infantry Regiment (French: 43^{e} Régiment d'Infanterie de Ligne) (colonel de Viville)
  - 5e Bataillon de Chasseurs à Pied (French: 5^{e} Bataillon de Chasseurs à Pied) (commandant Carré)
- 2nd Brigade of général Pradier
  - 64th Infantry Regiment (French: 64^{e} Régiment d'Infanterie de Ligne) (colonel Léger)
  - 98th Infantry Regiment (French: 98^{e} Régiment d'Infanterie de Ligne) (colonel Lechesne)
- 3 batteries d'artillerie (2 batteries de 4 et 1 de mitrailleuses) and 1 Engineer Company

3rd Infantry Division

The 3rd Infantry Division of the 4th Army Corps was under the orders of général Latrille comte de Lorencez

- 1st Brigade of général comte de Pajol
  - 15th Infantry Regiment (French: 15^{e} régiment d'infanterie de ligne) (colonel Fraboulet de Kerléadec)
  - 33rd Infantry Regiment (French: 33^{e} régiment d'infanterie de ligne) (colonel Bounetou)
  - 2e Bataillon de Chasseurs à Pied (French: 2^{e} Bataillon de Chasseurs à Pied) (commandant Le Tanneur)
- 2nd Brigade of général Berger
  - 54th Infantry Regiment (French: 54^{e} Régiment d'Infanterie de Ligne) (colonel Caillot)
  - 65th Infantry Regiment (French: 65^{e} Régiment d'Infanterie de Ligne) (colonel Sée)
- 3 Artillery Batteries (2 batteries de 4 et 1 de mitrailleuses) and 1 Engineer Company

Cavalry Division

The Cavalry Division of the 4th Army Corps was commanded by général Legrand

- 1st Brigade of général de Montaigu
  - 2nd Hussard Regiment (French: 2^{e} Régiment de Hussards) (colonel Carrelet)
  - 7th Hussard Regiment (French: 7^{e} Régiment de Hussards) (colonel Chaussée)
- 2nd Brigade of général baron de Gondrecourt
  - 3rd Dragoon Regiment (French: 3^{e} Régiment de Dragons) (colonel Bilhau)
  - 11th Dragoon Regiment (French: 11^{e} Régiment de Dragons) (colonel Huyn de Verneville)

Reserve Artillery

Artillery Reserve was under the orders of colonel Soleille

- 2 Artillery Batteries de 12
- 2 Artillery Batteries de 4 mounted
- 2 Artillery Batteries de 4 horse mounted
- Parc Artillery, Reserve and Parc Engineer

=== 5th Army Corps ===
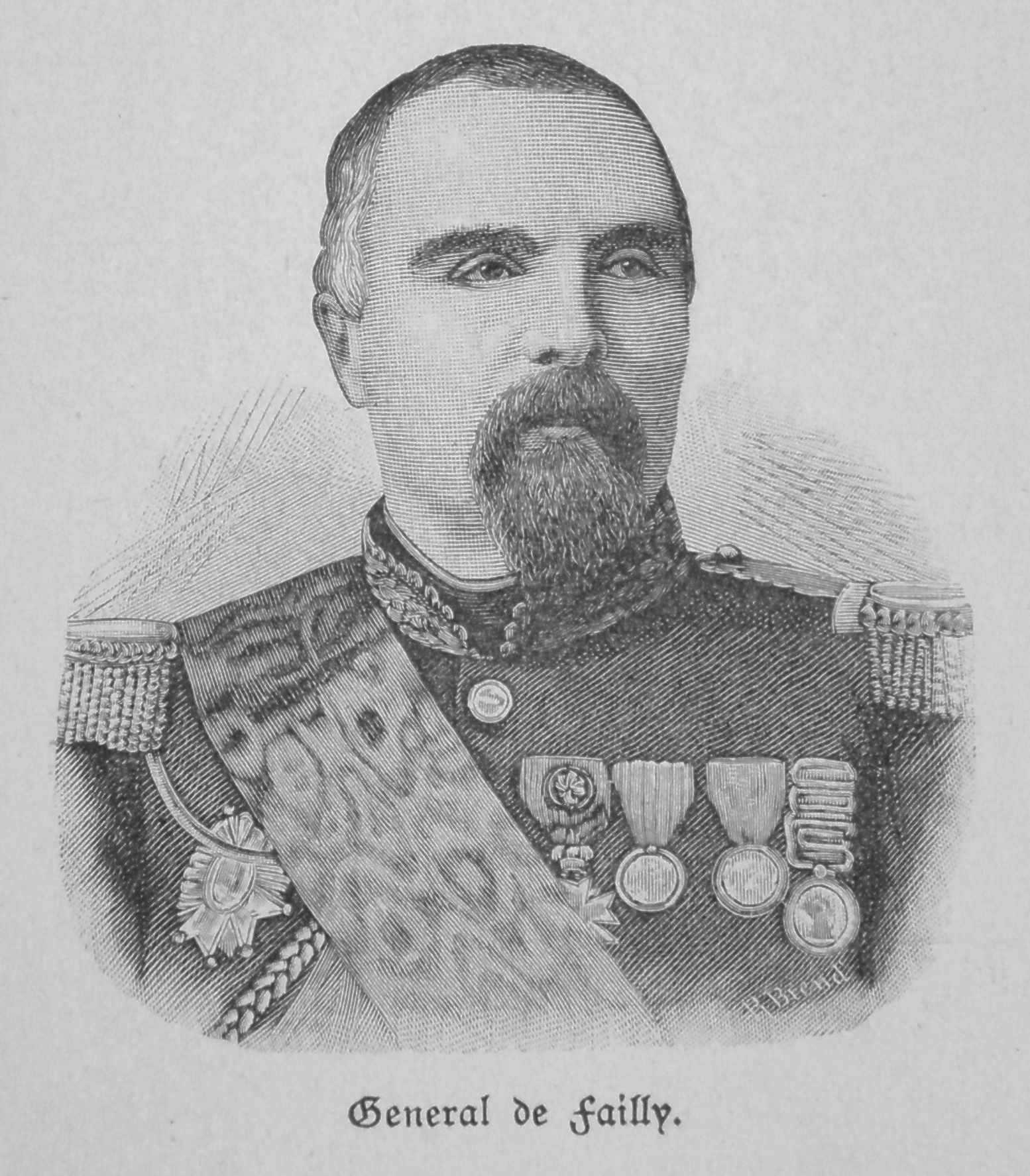
Général de Failly, commander of the 5th Army Corps.

The 5th Army Corps (French: 5^{e} Corps d'Armée) was commanded by général de Failly, with chef d'état-major général Besson.

1st Infantry Division

The 1st Infantry Division of the 5th Army Corps was under the orders of général Goze.

- 1st Brigade of général Grenier then Saurin
  - 11th Infantry Regiment (French: 11^{e} Régiment d'Infanterie de Ligne) (colonel de Béhagle)
  - 46th Infantry Regiment (French: 46^{e} Régiment d'Infanterie de Ligne) (colonel Pichon)
  - 4e Bataillon de Chasseurs à Pied (French: 4^{e} Bataillon de Chasseurs à Pied) (commandant Foncegrives)
- 2nd Brigade of général baron Nicolas
  - 61st Infantry Regiment (French: 61^{e} Régiment d'Infanterie de Ligne) (colonel du Moulin)
  - 86th Infantry Regiment (French: 86^{e} Régiment d'Infanterie de Ligne) (colonel Auguste Florimond dit Alexis Berthe)
- 3 Artillery Batteries (2 batteries de 4 and 1 de mitrailleuses) and 1 Engineer Company

2nd Infantry Division

The 2nd Infantry Division of the 5th Army Corps was under the orders of général de l'Abadie d'Aydren.

- 1st Brigade of général Lapasset
  - 84th Infantry Regiment (French: 84^{e} Régiment d'Infanterie de Ligne) (colonel Benoit)
  - 97th Infantry Regiment (French: 97^{e} Régiment d'Infanterie de Ligne) (colonel Copmartin)
  - 14e Bataillon de Chasseurs à Pied (French: 14^{e} Bataillon de Chasseurs à Pied) (commandant Planck)
- 2nd Brigade of général de Maussion
  - 49th Infantry Regiment (French: 49^{e} Régiment d'Infanterie de Ligne) (colonel Kampf)
  - 88th Infantry Regiment (French: 88^{e} Régiment d'Infanterie de Ligne) (colonel Courty)
- 3 Artillery Batteries (2 batteries de 4 and 1 de mitrailleuses) and 1 Engineer Company

3rd Infantry Division

The 3rd Infantry Division of the 5th Army Corps was under the orders of général Guyot de Lespart

- 1st Brigade of général Abattucci
  - 17th Infantry Regiment (French: 17^{e} Régiment d'Infanterie de Ligne) (colonel Weissemberger)
  - 27th Infantry Regiment (French: 27^{e} Régiment d'Infanterie de Ligne) (colonel de Barolet)
  - 19e Bataillon de Chasseurs à Pied (French: 19^{e} Bataillon de Chasseurs à Pied) (commandant Léon Michel Marie Louis de Marqué)
- 2nd Brigade of général de Fontanges de Couzan
  - 30th Infantry Regiment (French: 30^{e} Régiment d'Infanterie de Ligne) (colonel Wirbel)
  - 68th Infantry Regiment (French: 68^{e} Régiment d'Infanterie de Ligne) (colonel Paturel)
- 3 Artillery Batteries (2 batteries de 4 and 1 de mitrailleuses) and 1 Engineer Company

Cavalry Division

The Cavalry Division of the 5th Army Corps was commanded by général Brahaut

- 1st Brigade of général de Bernis
  - 5th Hussards Regiment (French: 5^{e} Régiment de Hussards) (colonel Flogny)
  - 12e Régiment de Chasseurs à Cheval (French: 12^{e} Régiment de Chasseurs à Cheval) (colonel de Tucé)
- 2nd Brigade of général de la Mortière
  - 3rd Lancers Regiment (French: 3^{e} Régiment de Lanciers) (colonel Thorel)
  - 5th Lancers Regiment (French: 5^{e} Régiment de Lanciers) (colonel de Boério)

Reserve Artillery

Colonel de Salignac-Fénelon

- 2 Artillery Batteries de 12
- 2 Artillery Batteries de 4 mounted
- 2 Artillery Batteries de 4 horse mounted
- Parc Artillery, Reserve and Parc Engineer

=== 6th Army Corps ===
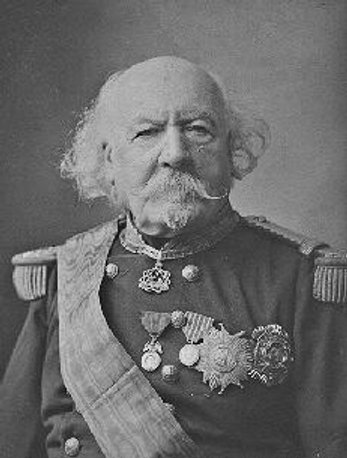
Général de Canrobert, commander of the 6th Army Corps.

The 6th Army Corps was (French: 6^{e} Corps d'Armée) was commanded by Marshal Certain de Canrobert, with chef d'état-major général Henry.

1st Infantry Division

The 1st Infantry Division of the 6th Army Corps was under the orders of général Tixier

- 1st Brigade of général Péchot
  - 4th Infantry Regiment (French: 4^{e} Régiment d'Infanterie de Ligne) (colonel Vincendon)
  - 10th Infantry Regiment (French: 10^{e} Régiment d'Infanterie de Ligne) (colonel Ardan du Picq)
  - 9e Bataillon de Chasseurs à Pied (French: 9^{e} Bataillon de Chasseurs à Pied) (commandant Mathelin)
- 2nd Brigade of général Leroy de Dais
  - 12th Infantry Regiment (French: 12^{e} Régiment d'Infanterie de Ligne) (colonel Lebrun)
  - 100th Infantry Regiment (French: 100^{e} Régiment d'Infanterie de Ligne) (colonel Grémion)
- 3 Artillery Batteries (2 batteries de 4 and 1 de mitrailleuses) and 1 Engineer Company

2nd Infantry Division

The 2nd Infantry Division of the 6th Army Corps was under the orders of général Bisson

- 1st Brigade of général Noel puis Archinard
  - 9^{e} Régiment d'Infanterie de Ligne (French: 9^{e} Régiment d'Infanterie de Ligne) (colonel Roux)
  - 14th Infantry Regiment (French: 14^{e} Régiment d'Infanterie de Ligne) (colonel Louvent)
- 2nd Brigade of général Maurice
  - 20th Infantry Regiment (French: 20^{e} Régiment d'Infanterie de Ligne) (colonel de la Guigneraye)
  - 31st Infantry Regiment (French: 31^{e} Régiment d'Infanterie de Ligne) (colonel Sautereau)
- 3 Artillery Batteries (2 batteries de 4 et 1 de mitrailleuses) and 1 Engineer Company

3rd Infantry Division

The 3rd Infantry Division of the 6th Army Corps was under the orders of général Lafont de Villiers

- 1st Brigade of général Béquet de Sonnay
  - 75th Infantry Regiment (French: 75^{e} Régiment d'Infanterie de Ligne) (colonel Amadieu)
  - 91st Infantry Regiment (French: 91^{e} Régiment d'Infanterie de Ligne) (colonel Daguerre)
- 2nd Brigade of général Colin
  - 93rd Infantry Regiment (French: 93^{e} Régiment d'Infanterie de Ligne) (colonel Ganzin)
  - 94th Infantry Regiment (French: 94^{e} Régiment d'Infanterie de Ligne) (colonel de Geslin)
- 3 Artillery Batteries batteries de 4 et 1 Engineer Company

4th Infantry Division

The 4th Infantry Division of the 6th Army Corps was under the orders of général Levassor-Sorval

- 1st Brigade of général de Marguenat then Gibon
  - 25th Infantry Regiment (French: 25^{e} Régiment d'Infanterie de Ligne) (colonel Gibon)
  - 26th Infantry Regiment (French: 26^{e} Régiment d'Infanterie de Ligne) (colonel Hanrion)
- 2nd Brigade of général comte de Chanaleilles
  - 28th Infantry Regiment (French: 28^{e} Régiment d'Infanterie de Ligne) (colonel Lamothe)
  - 70th Infantry Regiment (French: 70^{e} Régiment d'Infanterie de Ligne) (colonel Henrion Bertier)
- 3 Artillery Batteries de 4 and 1 Engineer Company

Cavalry Division

The Cavalry Division of the 6th Army Corps was commanded by général de Salignac-Fénelon

- 1st Brigade of général Tilliard
  - 1^{er} Régiment de Hussards (French: 1^{er} Régiment de Hussards) (colonel de Bauffremont)
  - 6e Régiment de Chasseurs à Cheval (French: 6^{e} Régiment de Chasseurs à Cheval) (colonel Bonvoust)
- 2nd Brigade of général de Savaresse
  - 1st Lancers Regiment (French: 1^{er} Régiment de Lanciers) (colonel Oudinot de Reggio)
  - 7th Lancers Regiment (French: 7^{e} régiment de lanciers) (colonel Périer)
- 3rd Brigade of général Yvelin de Béville
  - 5th Cuirassiers Regiment (French: 5^{e} régiments de cuirassiers) (colonel Dubessey de Contenson)
  - 6th Cuirassiers Regiment (French: 6^{e} régiments de cuirassiers) (colonel Martin)

Cavalry Division

The Cavalry Division attached to the 6th Army Corps since August 18 in replacement of the division of Salignac-Fénelon, was commanded by général du Barail

- 1st Brigade of général de Lajaille
  - 2nd African Chasseurs Regiment (French: 2^{e} Régiment de Chasseurs d'Afrique) (colonel de la Martinière)
  - 2nd Chasseurs Regiment of France (French: 2^{e} Régiment de Chasseurs de France) (colonel Pelletier)
- 2nd Brigade of général de Bruchard
  - 3e Régiment de Chasseurs à Cheval (French: 3^{e} Régiment de Chasseurs à Cheval) (colonel de Sansal)
  - 10e Régiment de Chasseurs à Cheval (French: 10^{e} Régiment de Chasseurs à Cheval) (colonel Nérin)

Reserve Artillery

- Artillery reserve under the orders of général Bertrand
  - 2 Artillery Batteries de 12
  - 4 Artillery Batteries de 4 montées
  - 2 Artillery Batteries de 4 horse mounted
- Parc d'artillerie, réserve et parc du génie

=== 7th Army Corps ===
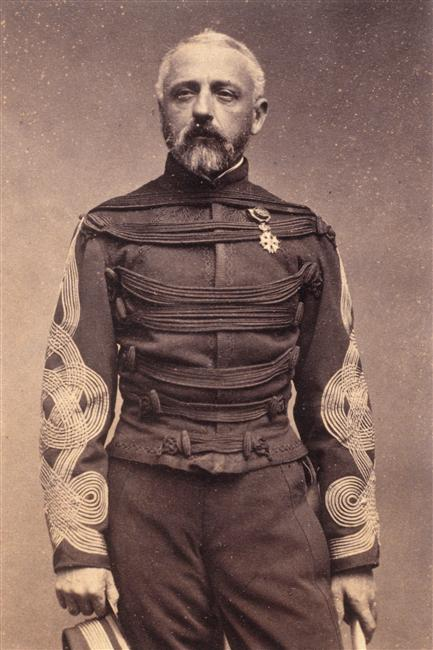
Général Douay, commander of the 7th Army Corps.

The 7th Army Corps (French: 7^{e} Corps d'Armée) was commanded by général Douay, with chef d'état-major général Renson.

1st Infantry Division

The 1st Infantry Division of the 7th Army Corps was under the orders of général Conseil-Dumesnil.

- 1st Brigade of général Nicolaï
  - 3rd Infantry Regiment (French: 3^{e} Régiment d'Infanterie de Ligne) (colonel Champion)
  - 21st Infantry Regiment (French: 21^{e} Régiment d'Infanterie de Ligne) (colonel Morand)
  - 17e Bataillon de Chasseurs à Pied (French: 17^{e} Bataillon de Chasseurs à Pied) (commandant Jules Florimond Germain Merchier)
- 2nd Brigade of général Maire
  - 47th Infantry Regiment (French: 47^{e} Régiment d'Infanterie de ligne) (colonel de Gramont)
  - 99th Infantry Regiment (French: 99^{e} Régiment d'Infanterie de Ligne) (colonel Chagrin de Saint-Hilaire)
- 3 Artillery Batteries (two batteries de 4 and 1 de mitrailleuse) and 1 Engineer Company

2nd Infantry Division

The 2nd Infantry Division of the 7th Army Corps was under the orders of général Liébert.

- 1st Brigade of général Guiomar
  - 5th Infantry Regiment (French: 5^{e} Régiment d'Infanterie de Ligne) (colonel Boyer)
  - 37th Infantry Regiment (French: 37^{e} Régiment d'Infanterie de Ligne) (colonel de Formy de la Blanchetée)
  - 6e Bataillon de Chasseurs à Pied (French: 6^{e} Bataillon de Chasseurs à Pied) (commandant de Beaufort)
- 2nd Brigade of général de la Bastide
  - 53 Infantry Regiment (French: 53^{e} Régiment d'Infanterie de Ligne) (colonel Japy)
  - 89th Infantry Regiment (French: 89^{e} Régiment d'Infanterie de Ligne) (colonel Munier)
- 3 Artillery Batteries (two batteries de 4 and 1 de mitrailleuse) and 1 Engineer Company

3rd Infantry Division

The 3rd Infantry Division of the 7th Army Corps was under the orders of général Dumont.

- 1st Brigade of général Bordas
  - 52nd Infantry Regiment (French: 52^{e} Régiment d'Infanterie de Ligne) (colonel Aveline)
  - 79th Infantry Regiment (French: 79^{e} Régiment d'Infanterie de Ligne) (colonel Bressolles)
- 2nd Brigade of général Bittard des Portes
  - 82nd Infantry Regiment (French: 82^{e} Régiment d'Infanterie de Ligne) (colonel Guys)
  - 83rd Infantry Regiment (French: 83^{e} Régiment d'Infanterie de Ligne) (colonel Séatelli)
- 3 Artillery Batteries (two batteries de 4 and 1 de mitrailleuse) and 1 Engineer Company

Cavalry Division

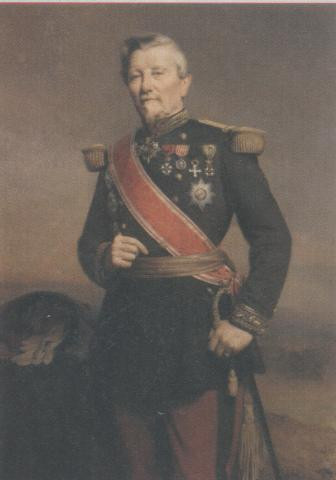
Général Ameil, commander of the cavalry division of the 7th Army Corps.

The Cavalry Division of the 7th Army Corps was commanded by général baron Ameil.

- 1st Brigade of général Cambriel
  - 4^{e} Régiment de Hussards (French: 4^{e} Régiment de Hussards) (colonel de Lavigerie)
  - 4th Lancers Regiment (French: 4^{e} Régiment de Lanciers) (colonel Féline)
  - 8th Lancers Regiment (French: 8^{e} Régiment de Lanciers) (colonel de Dampierre)
- 2nd Brigade of général Jolif-Ducoulombier
  - 6th Hussards Regiment (French: 6^{e} Régiment de Hussards) (colonel Guillon)
  - 6^{e} Régiment de Dragons (French: 6^{e} Régiment de Dragons) (colonel Tillion)

Reserve Artillery

Colonel Aubac

- 2 Artillery Batteries de 12,
- 2 Artillery Batteries de 4 mounted,
- 2 Artillery Batteries de 4 horse mounted.
- Parc Artillery, Reserves and Parc Engineer.

=== Reserve Cavalry ===
1st Cavalry Division

The 1st Reserve Cavalry Division was commanded by général du Barail.

- 1st Brigade of général Margueritte.
  - 1st African Chasseurs Regiment (French: 1^{er} Régiment de Chasseurs d'Afrique) (colonel Clicquot)
  - 3rd African Chasseurs Regiment (French: 3^{e} Régiment de Chasseurs d'Afrique) (colonel de Galliffet)
- 2nd Brigade of général de Lajaille.
  - 2nd African Chasseurs Regiment (French: 2^{e} Régiment de Chasseurs d'Afrique) (colonel de la Martinière)
  - 4th African Chasseurs Regiment (French: 4^{e} Régiment de Chasseurs d'Afrique) (colonel de Quélen)
- 2 Artillery Batteries horse mounted

The 2nd Reserve Cavalry Division was commanded by général de Bonnemain.

2nd Cavalry Division

- 1st Brigade of général Girard.
  - 1st Cuirassiers Regiment (French: 1^{er} Régiment de Cuirassiers) (colonel Leforestier de Vendeuvre)
  - 4th Cuirassiers Regiment (French: 4^{e} Régiment de Cuirassiers) (colonel Billet)
- 2nd Brigade of général de Brauer.
  - 2nd Cuirassiers Regiment (French: 2^{e} Régiment de Cuirassiers) (colonel Rossetti)
  - 3rd Cuirassiers Regiment (French: 3^{e} Régiment de Cuirassiers) (colonel Lafutsun de Lacarre)
- 2 Artillery Batteries horse mounted

3rd Cavalry Division

The 3rd Reserve Cavalry Division was commanded by général de Forton.

- 1st Brigade of général Prince Murat.
  - 1st Dragoon Regiment (French: 1^{er} Régiment de Dragons) (colonel Forceville)
  - 9th Dragoon Regiment (French: 9^{e} Régiment de Dragons) (colonel Reboul)
- 2nd Brigade of général de Gramont, duc de Lesparre.
  - 7th Cuirassiers Regiment (French: 7^{e} régiment de Cuirassiers) (colonel Nitot)
  - 10th Cuirassiers Regiment (French: 10^{e} Régiment de Cuirassiers) (colonel Juncker)
- 2 Artillery Batteries horse mounted

=== Reserve Artillery and Engineer ===
General Reserve Artillery

Commanded by général Canu.

- 1st Division of colonel Salvador (8 Artillery Batteries de 12)
- 1st Division of colonel Toussaint (8 Artillery Batteries horse mounted)

Grand parc de campagne

Commanded by général de Mitrecé.

General Reserve of Engineer

Commanded by colonel Rémond.

- 2 Sapeurs Companies
- 1 Mining Company
- 1 Detachment of Sapeurs-Conducteurs

Grand parc du Génie

== Chronology of operations ==
- Battle of Sarrebuck (1870) (French: Bataille de Sarrebruck (1870)).
  - Order of Battle during the Battle of Sarrebruck (French: Ordre de bataille lors de la bataille de Sarrebruck).
- Battle of Wissembourg (1870) (French: Bataille de Wissembourg (1870)).
  - Order of Battle during the Battle of Wissembourg (1870) (French: Ordre de bataille lors de la bataille de Wissembourg (1870)).
- Battle of Forbach-Spicheren (French: Bataille de Forbach-Spicheren).
  - Order of Battle during the Battle of Forbach-Spicheren (French: Ordre de bataille lors de la bataille de Forbach-Spicheren).
- Battle of Frœschwiller-Wœrth (1870) (French: Bataille de Frœschwiller-Wœrth (1870)).
  - Order of Battle during the Battle Frœschwiller-Wœrth (French: Ordre de bataille lors de la bataille de Frœschwiller-Wœrth (1870)).
- Bitche during the Siege of 1870–1871 (French: Bitche pendant le siège de 1870–1871).
- Battle of Borny–Colombey (French: Bataille de Borny-Colombey).
- Battle of Mars-la-Tour (French: Bataille de Mars-la-Tour).
- Siege of Toul (French: Siège de Toul).
- Battle of Saint-Privat (French: Bataille de Saint-Privat).
- Siege of Metz (1870) (French: Siège de Metz (1870)).
- Siege of Strasbourg (French: Siège de Strasbourg).
- Battle of Noisseville (French: Bataille de Noisseville).

== Sources and bibliography ==
- Lieutenant-colonel Rousset, Histoire générale de la guerre franco allemande - 1870–1871, éditions Montgredien et Cie, 1900.
- Paul et Victor Margueritte, Histoire de la guerre de 1870–71, Éditions G. Chamerot, 1903.
- Général Niox, La guerre de 1870 - Simple récit, Librairie Ch. Delagrave, 1898.
- Annuaire militaire de l'empire français 1870
- Ferdinand Lecomte : Relation historique et critique de la guerre franco-allemande en 1870–1871
- Annuaire militaire de 1870 (pour les prénoms)
