= Decaen =

Decaen is a French surname. People of that name include:

- Charles Mathieu Isidore Decaen (1769–1832), French general
- Claude Théodore Decaen (1811–1870), French general
