= 4th Hussar Regiment (France) =

French army regiment

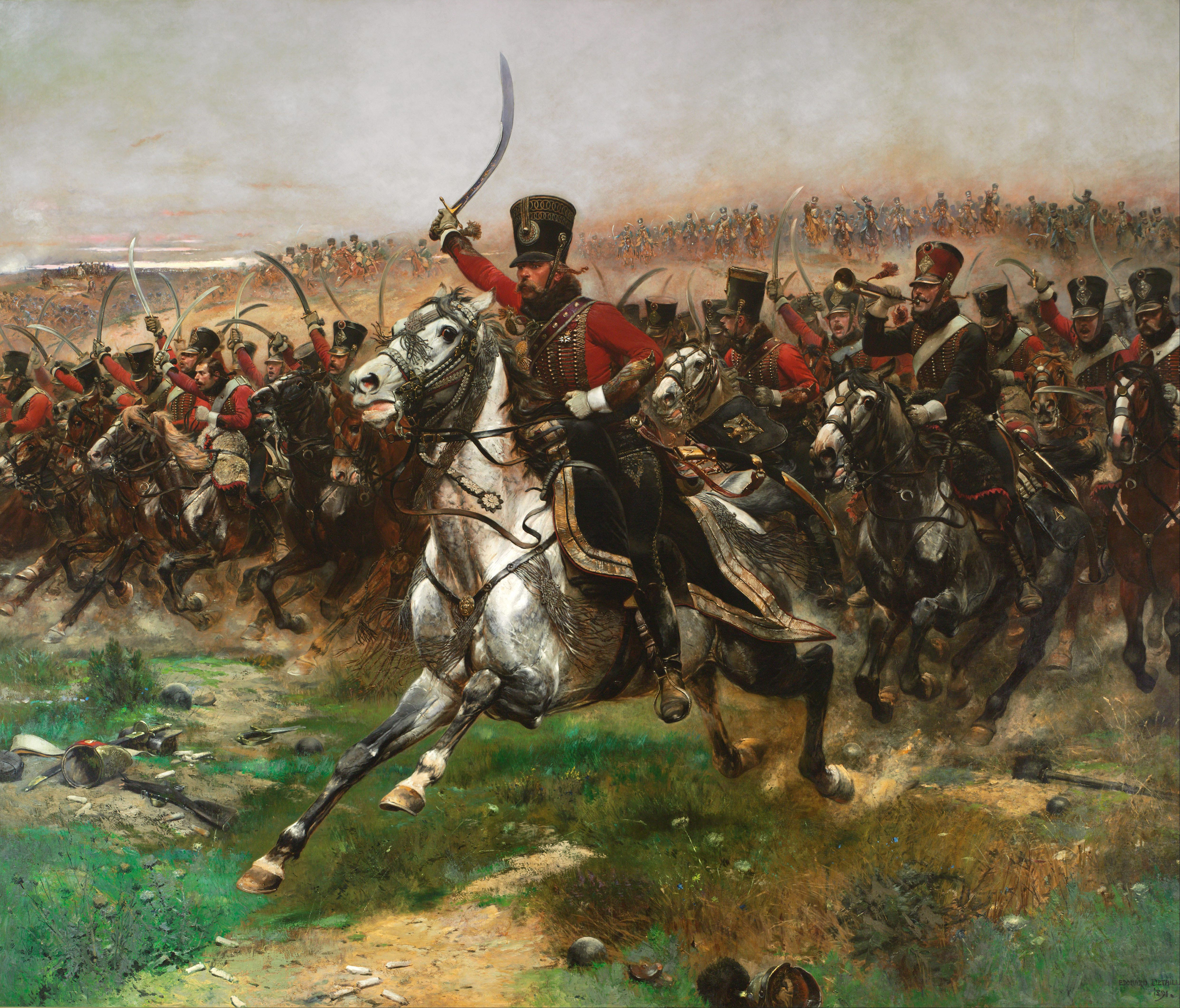
4th Hussar Regiment at the Battle of Friedland, 14 June 1807. Vive l'Empereur! by Édouard Detaille, 1891.

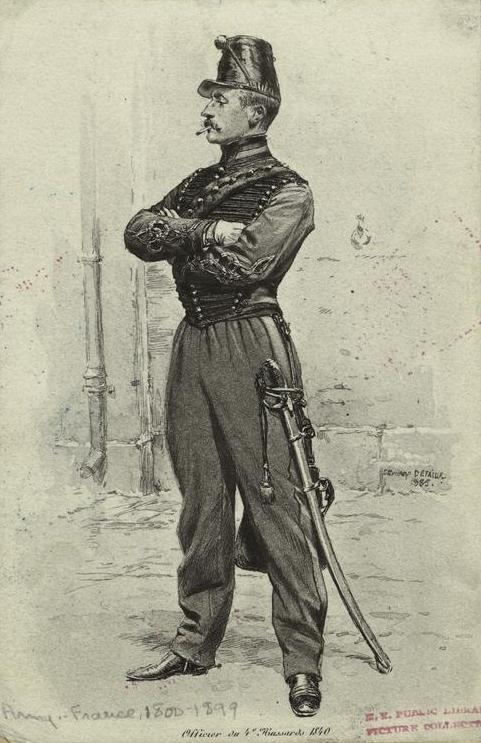
An officer of the 4th Hussar Regiment in 1840.

The 4th Hussar Regiment (4e régiment de hussards) is a hussar regiment in the French Army, raised and embodied in 1783 and still in existence.

== Formation and the Revolutionary wars (1783–1800) ==
It was created as the hussards Colonel Général on 31 July 1783 for the Duke of Chartres (later known as Philippe Égalité), by taking one squadron from each of the Bercheny, Chamborant, Conflans and Esterhazy regiments of hussars. On 30 May 1788 it was reinforced by a contingent of soldiers taken from the régiment de Quercy, régiment de Septimanie, régiment de Nassau, régiment de La Marck, régiment de Franche-Comté and régiment des Évéchés, all then cavalry units. The new hussar regiment would enter combat multiple times during the War of the 1st and 2nd Coalitions. Such notable battles include, Valmy (1792), Croix-aux-Bois (1792), Maastricht (1793), Hondschoote (1793), Flerus (1794), Stockach (1799), Second Battle of Zurich (1799), and Hohenlinden (1800).

== Napoleonic Wars ==
The hussars also played a prominent role as cavalry in the Napoleonic Wars (1803–1815), serving in campaigns in Austria (1805 & 1809), Prussia (1805 -1806), Poland (1806), Spain (1809 - 1813), Germany (1812), France (1814 - 1815), and Belgium (1815) before being disbanded by the Bourbon Restoration.

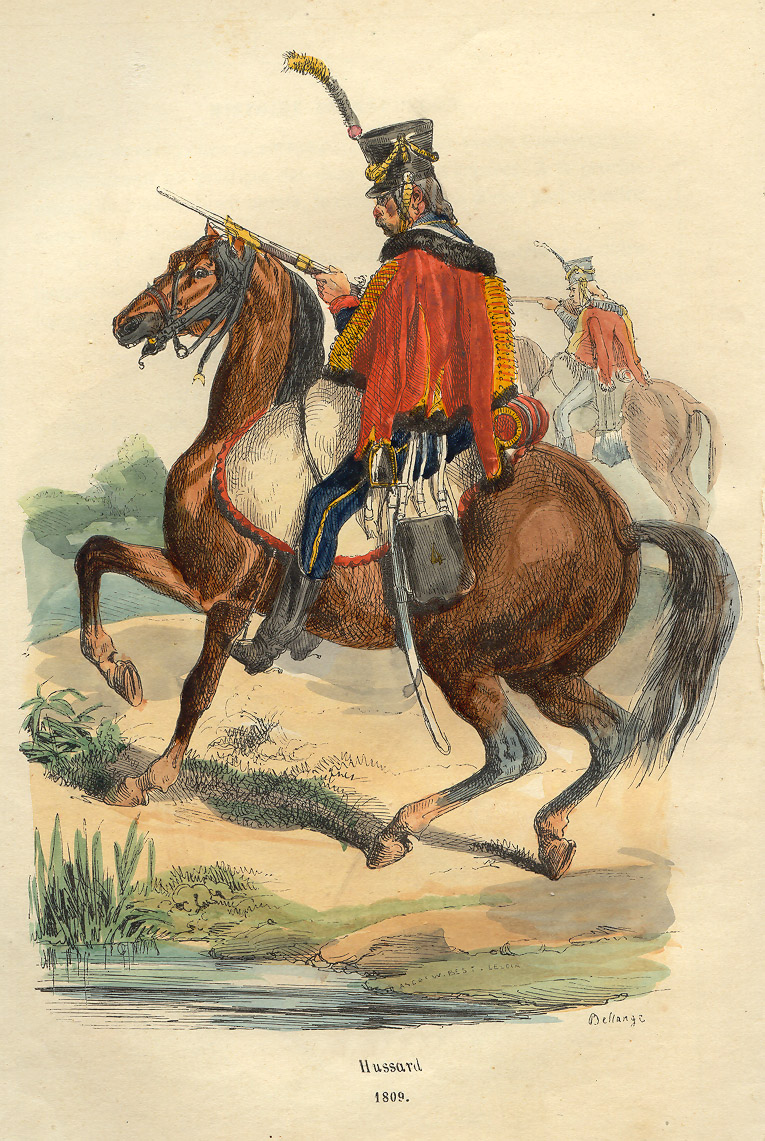
A hussar of the 4th Hussar Regiment, during the War of the 5th Coalition.(1809)

As light cavalrymen mounted on fast horses, they would be used to fight skirmish battles and for scouting. Most of the great European powers raised hussar regiments. The armies of France, Austria, Prussia, and Russia had included hussar regiments since the mid-18th century. In the case of Britain, four light dragoon regiments were converted to hussars in 1806–1807.

Hussars gained notoriety in the Grande Armée after the invasion of Egypt. At the Battle of Salalieh in August 1798, a brigade commander named Antoine Charles Louis de Lasalle fought "like a demon" and solidified his reputation as a maverick rider upon returning to France and receiving Weapons of Honour. At the ceremony (in a remark often mistakenly attributed to Napoleon), Lasalle quipped "Any hussar who isn't dead at age 30 is a layabout." The hussars of Napoleon's army created the tradition of sabrage, the opening of a champagne bottle with a sabre. Moustaches were universally worn by Napoleonic period hussars, the British hussars were the only moustachioed troops in the British Army – leading to occasional taunts of "foreigner" from their brothers-in-arms. French hussars also wore cadenettes, braids of hair hanging to either side of the face, until the practice was officially proscribed when shorter hair became universal.

The uniforms worn by Napoleonic hussars were unique to each regiment but all featured the dolman – a colourful, braided stable jacket – and the pelisse, a short fur-edged jacket which was often worn slung over one shoulder in the style of a cape and fastened with a cord. This garment was extensively adorned with braiding (often gold or silver for officers) and several rows of multiple buttons.

On active service the hussar normally wore reinforced breeches which had leather on the inside of the leg to prevent them from wearing due to the extensive time spent in the saddle. On the outside of such breeches, running up the outside was a row of buttons, and sometimes a stripe in a different colour. A shako or fur busby was worn as headwear. The colours of dolman, pelisse, and breeches varied greatly by regiment, even within the same army.

The French hussar of the Napoleonic period was armed with a brass-hilted sabre, a carbine, and sometimes with a brace of pistols, although these were often unavailable. The British hussar was armed, in addition to his firearms, with the Pattern 1796 light cavalry sabre.

A famous military commander in Bonaparte's army who began his military career as a hussar was Marshal Ney, who after being employed as a clerk in an iron works joined the 5th Hussars in 1787. He rose through the ranks of the hussars in the wars of Belgium and the Rhineland (1794–1798) fighting against the forces of Austria and Prussia before receiving his marshal's baton in 1804 after the Emperor Napoleon's coronation.

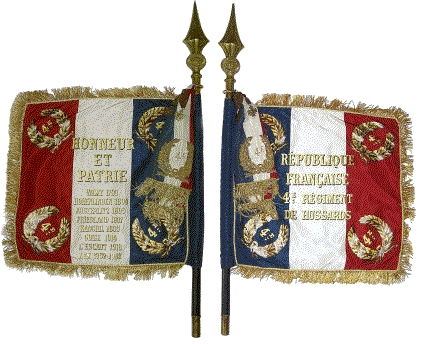
Standard for the 4th Hussar Regiment. The standard on the right inscribes the title of the 4th Hussar Regiment. The words inscribed on the left standard are in the following order: Valmy 1792; Hohenlinden 1800; Austerlitz 1804; Friedland 1807; Kanghil 1855; Guise 1914; Second Battle of Belgium (1918); Algerian War (1954–1962)

On the French Revolution, it was numbered as the 5th Hussar Regiment during the army reorganisation of 1 January 1791, as the fifth oldest cavalry unit in the French army, before being promoted to 4th Hussar Regiment in 1793 after the previous holder of that title. In 1814, just before the fall of the First French Empire, it was renamed the régiment des hussards de Monsieur, though it resumed the title of 4th Hussar Regiment during the Hundred Days before being disbanded on the Bourbon Restoration which followed. After Napoleon returned from exile and invaded Belgium, the 4th Hussar Regiment would enter combat at the final battles of Ligny, and Waterloo, in which Napoleon would be defeated.

== 1816 – 1991 ==
In 1816 the régiment des hussards du Nord was formed and in 1825 this unit took the title 4th Hussar Regiment. They will garrison the cities of Orléans and Poitiers. After a new Second Republic or Second French Empire overthrown the Bourbon Monarchy (see Bourbon Restoration), the 4th Hussar Regiment was stationed at Sedan. They took part in the Crimean Wars, specifically at the Battle of Kanghil, capturing several Russian guns. They would enter action in the Franco-Prussian war, becoming part of the Army of the Rhine.

In 1880, the 4th Hussar Regiment, now one of the most experienced of the French Army, took part in the colonization of Tunisia. In World War I, the regiment would be based in Verdun, and suffered heavy casualties from impeding German attacks. During the World War II, the regiment tried, and failed to defend Luxembourg from German annexation. It took part in the Battle of France, when it was disbanded after the French defeat. After the liberation of France and parts of Belgium by the Western Allies, on 15 February 1945 a new 4th Hussar Regiment was formed by splitting-off elements of COABC 405. On 30 October 1945 the new unit was disbanded and turned into the 2nd Hussar Regiment.

On 15 July 1956 the 4th Hussar Regiment was again recreated, this time from elements of 251e B, before being disbanded again in 1958. It was re-created yet again on 1 April 1959 from elements of 31st Dragoon Regiment, surviving until 1964, taking part in the Algerian War. It was disbanded to become the 8th Dragoon Regiment and immediately recreated from elements of 1st African Chasseurs (1er régiment de chasseurs d'Afrique) and from the instruction centre of the 6th Dragoon Regiment. This unit was disbanded at Laon, with its colours being entrusted to the GMR/6-4e RH).

In 1991 the 4th Hussar Regiment was yet again recreated, becoming the support regiment to the RMD-NE/CMD Metz. In 2000 it took the name of 4th Hussar Squadron Group (4e Groupe d'escadrons de hussards or 4e G.E.H), which it still holds to this day.

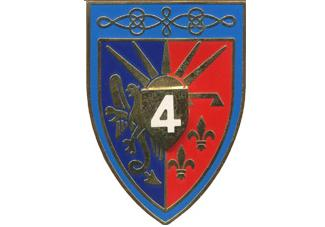
The Regiment Insignia of the 4th Hussar Regiment.

== Colonels (Formerly 'Colonel Generals') of the 4th Hussar Regiment ==
=== Bourbons ===
- Count of Montreal (1779)
- Marquis du Chastelier-Dumesnil (1783)

=== Officers of the Revolutionary army ===
- Colonel Drouot de la Marche (1791)
- Colonel Miezskowski (1792)
- Barbier Brigade leader (1793)*Colonel General title withdrawn*
- Boyè Brigade leader (1794)
- Flosse Brigade leader (1794- 1796)
- Chef de Brigade Merlin (1796)
- Lieutenant Pajol (1797 -1800)

=== Napoleonic officers ===
- Colonel Andrè Burthe (1804 - 1811) * Colonel General title restored*
- Colonel Christophe (1811- 1815)
- Colonel Blot (1815)

=== Bourbon Restorationists ===
- Colonel Charles Oudinot (1816 -1822)
- Colonel Merssemann (1822 -1829)
- Colonel Louvencourt (1829)
- Colonel Richard (1830)
- Colonel Antoine Fortùne de Brack (1832 -1838)
- Colonel Lesparda (1838 - 1840)

=== Second French Empire/republic ===
- Colonel Dormoy (1841 -1850)
- Colonel Gallais (1850- 1854)
- Colonel Simon Mortière (1855- 1864)
- Colonel Choury Virgerie (1864 -1870)

=== Third French Republic ===
- Colonel Cousin Montauban (1871–1875)
- Colonel Bauviaux (1875–1879)
- Colonel De Poul (1880)
- Colonel Colinet Labeau (1886)
- Colonel Gaudin (1888)
- Colonel Moine le Margon (1895–1900)
- Colonel Duprat (1900–1907)
- Colonel Renaud (1907)
- Colonel Joubert (1911–1914)
- Colonel Dollfus (1915)
- Colonel Parrot (1916–1925)
- Colonel Bonnet (1925–1929)
- Colonel Langlois (1929)
- Colonel Bessey Contenson (1931)
- Colonel Poulof (1934)
- Colonel Rupied (1934–1938)
- Colonel Chiappini (1938–1940) *Regiment was dissolved*

=== Fourth French Republic ===
- Colonel Reboul (1945) *Regiment re-formed*
- Colonel Finaz (1945–1956)
- Colonel Duboster (1956)
- Colonel Giraud (1957)

=== Fifth French Republic ===
- Colonel Oddo (1959)
- Colonel Noe (1960)
- Colonel Heraud (1962)
- Colonel Burin (1964)
- Colonel Barry (1964)
- Colonel February (1966)
- Colonel Gonneville (1968)
- Colonel De Lassus (1970)
- Colonel De Zelicourt (1972)
- Colonel Chevallereau (1976)
- Colonel Jacquot (1978)
- Colonel Voinot (1980)
- Colonel Rocolle (1982 -1988)
- Colonel Boulery (1988)
- Lieutenant Colonel Lhomme (1991)
- Colonel Valet (1993)
- Colonel Enguilabert (1995)
- Colonel Colombel (1997)
- Lieutenant Colonel Joannes (1999)*unit demoted to squadron*
- Lieutenant Colonel Pillet (2001)
- Lieutenant Colonel Martin (2003)
- Lieutenant Colonel Salsedo (2005)
- Lieutenant Colonel Maurin (2007)
- Lieutenant Colonel Rocolle (2009) *unit now enters policing service*

== Notable Personnel/soldiers ==
These are one of many notable people that come from this regiment.

- Henri Jacques Guillaume Clarke, Napoleon I's future War Minister and Marshal. (joined the regiment in 1784)
- Michel Ney, a future Marshal of the First French Empire. (joined the regiment in 1787)
- Charles Marie Augustin De Goyon, a future Major General of the Second French Empire, and was an aide de camp to Emperor Napoleon III. (joined the regiment in 1832)
- Patrice de MacMahon, future president of the Third French Republic. (joined the regiment in 1830)
- Jean Compagon, a French General. (Commanded the 4th Hussar Regiment during 1937–1940)

== Battles of the 4th Hussar Regiment ==
Original article in French:

=== Revolutionary Wars (Wars of the 1st and 2nd Coalitions) ===
==== Under the command of the Army of the Center ====
- Battle of Valmy (21 September 1792) Result: French Victory
- Battle of Croix-Aux-Bois (1792)

==== Under the command of the Army of the North ====
- Battle of Maastricht (1793)
- Battle of Aldenhoven (1794) Result: French Victory
- Battle of Tirlemont (1794)
- Battle of Hondschoote (1793) Result: French Victory
- Battle of Wattignies (1793) Result: French Victory

==== Under the command of the Army of Sambre-et-Meuse ====
- Battle of Flerus (1794) Result: French Victory
- Skirmishes at Langenhiem (1795)
- Blockade of Mainz (1796) Result: Austrian/Coalition Victory
- The crossing over the Rhine at Neuwied (1797)

==== Under the command of the Army of Mainz ====
- Minor skirmishes in the Northern Frontier (1798)

==== Under the command of the Army of the Danube ====
- Battle of Stockach (1799) Result: Austrian/Coalition Victory
- Battle of Altiken (1799)
- Battle of Winterthur (1799) Result: Austrian/Coalition Victory
- Second Battle of Zurich (September, 1799) Result: French Victory

==== Under the command of the Army of the Rhine ====
Minor roles, part of the defense of the flanks of the Army of the Rhine (1800)

=== Napoleonic Wars ===
==== Under the command of I Corp of the Grande Armèè ====
Battles in Austria/modern day Czech Republic:

- Battle of Austerlitz (1805) Result: French Victory

Battles in Prussia and modern day Poland:

- Battle of Schleiz (1806) Result: French Victory
- Battle of Jena-Auerstedt(1806) Result: French Victory
- Battle of Lübeck (1806) Result: French Victory
- Battle of Liebstadt (1807) Result: French Victory
- Battle of Mohrungen (1807) Result: French Victory
- Battle of Friedland (1807) Result: French Victory

Battles in Spain and Portugal:

- Battle of Alcañiz (1809) Result: Spanish/Coalition Victory
- Battle of Belchite (1809) Result: French Victory
- Battle of Stella (1811)
- Battle of Chiclana (1811) Result: Coalition Victory
- Battle of Saguntum (1811) Result: French Victory
- Battle of Tecla (1813)
- Battle of Ordal (1813) Result: French Victory

Battles in modern day Germany:

- Battle of Gross Beeren (23 August 1813) Result: Coalition Victory
- Battle of Leipzig/Battle of the Nations (16–19 October 1813) Result: Coalition Victory

Battles in France:

- The 4th Hussar Regiment becomes part of the 7th Cavalry Corp. They will clash against Austrian troops near Bourg, then was pushed back by Austrian counterattacks in Macon. (1814)
- The Battle of Limonest took place, in which was followed by the abdication of Napoleon I. (20 March 1814) Result: Coalition Victory

Battles in Belgium:

- Following the return of Napoleon, the 4th Hussar Regiment was among the amphibious Invasion force that swept through southern Belgium. This force would ultimately be routed at Waterloo, and Napoleon finally ended his military career.
- Battle of Ligny (1815) Result: French Victory
- Battle of Waterloo (1815) Result: Coalition Victory

=== 1815 -1850 ===
The regiment would be reduced to a garrison sized force, and initially was stationed in Orlèans, and in 1848, was stationed at Poitiers. Throughout 1850, the regiment would be stationed at Sedan.

=== Crimean Wars -1914 ===
==== Crimean Wars ====
In the Crimean Wars, the regiment took part in the Battle of Kanghil (1855) and won fame, capturing multiple Russian artillery pieces. After the Crimean Wars settled down, there was the new threat of Prussia in mainland Europe.

==== Franco- Prussian War ====
The 4th Hussar Regiment took part in the defense of France, moving from Phalsbourg, to Belfort, to Reims.

Notable battles:

Battle of Sedan (1870) Result: Prussian/German Victory

==== Before 1914 ====
The 4th Hussar Regiment would take part in the campaign of colonial French troops, based in Tunisia, leading to the expansion in colonial territory.

=== World Wars ===
==== World War I ====
At the start of World War I, 4th Hussar Regiment's transport Corp was based in the city of Reims, with the rest of the regiment in Verdun, but did not stay at Verdun, which means that they did not participate in the Battle of Verdun.

Notable battles:

- Battle of Guise (1914) Result: German Victory
- Second Battle of Belgium (1918) Result: Allied Victory

==== World War II ====
Notable services:

- Phoney War (1940) Result: Bought the Germans valuable time to gather up forces
- Battle of France (1940) Result: German Victory
- Liberation of France (1945) Result: Successful

=== Algerian War ===
The most recent armed battles of the 4th Hussar Regiment took place in Algeria, where they kept order in the French protectorate until its independence in 1962.

== See also ==
Other French Hussar Regiment pages:

- 9th Hussar Regiment
- 5th Hussar Regiment
- 7th Hussar Regiment
- 11th Hussar Regiment
