= Vive L'Empereur (painting) =

Painting by Édouard Detaille

Vive L'Empereur!
- Vive L'Empereur – charge du quatrième hussards à la bataille de Friedland, 14 juin 1807 (French), Long live the Emperor – Charge of the 4th Hussars at the battle of Friedland, 14 June 1807 (English)
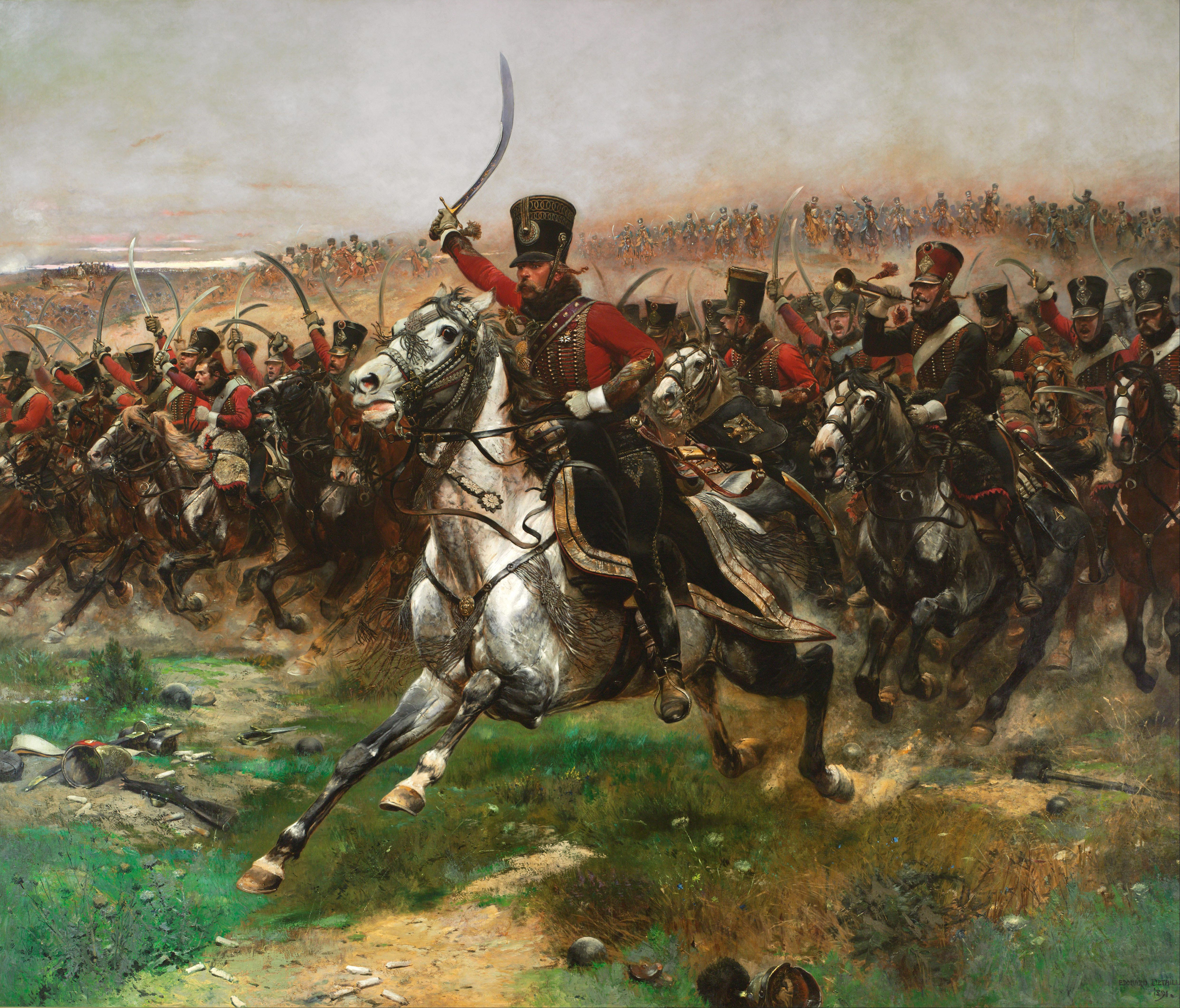
- Artist: Édouard Detaille
- Year: 1891
- Medium: Oil on canvas
- Subject: Cavalry charge of the French 4th Hussars
- Dimensions: 445 cm × 512.5 cm (175.2 in × 201.77 in)
- Condition: Restored
- Location: Art Gallery of New South Wales, Sydney
- Accession: 4560
- Website: artgallery.nsw.gov.au/4560

Vive L'Empereur! is a history painting made retrospectively by French artist Édouard Detaille in 1891, based upon the cavalry charge of the French 4th Hussars during the Battle of Friedland. The actual battle had taken place on 14 June 1807, some 41 years before the artist's birth.

== History ==
The painting was purchased by the Art Gallery of New South Wales in 1893, where it remains. In 1959, the painting was damaged severely by water, but it was restored during the 2000s.

== Museum ==
In June 2014, the Art Gallery of New South Wales purchased Portrait of Édouard Detaille by Basile Lemeunier (1852-1922), which shows Detaille at work in his studio – painting Vive L'Empereur! – atop a wooden ladder with a lit cigarette in his mouth. The portrait was exhibited at the Paris Salon in 1891.
