= Claude Théodore Decaen =

French military commander

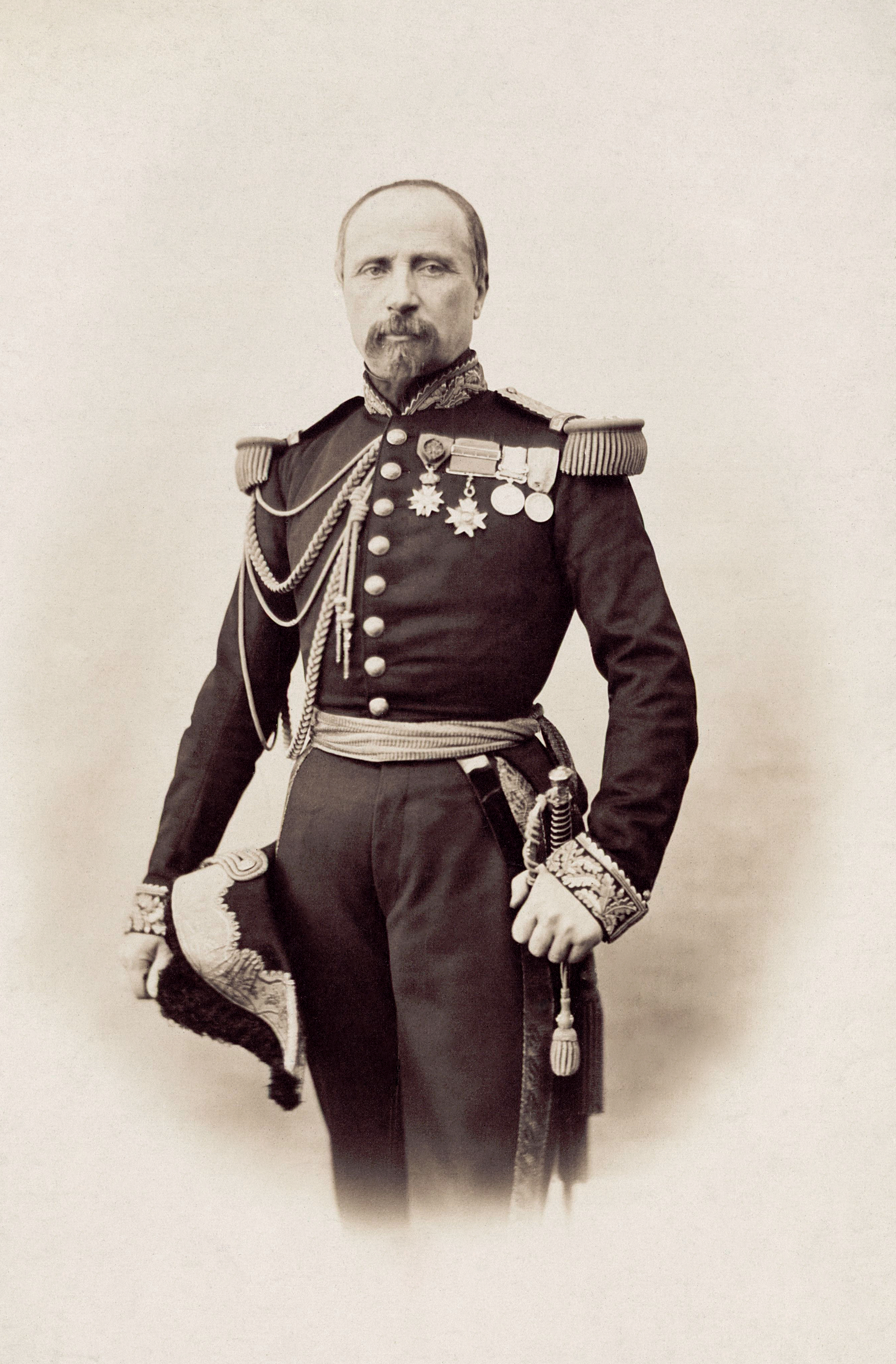
General Claude Théodore Decaen in a photographic portrait by Gustave Le Gray

General Claude Théodore Decaen (30 September 1811 in Utrecht – 17 August 1870 in Metz) was a French military commander. He was at military school in 1827, became a 2nd Lieutenant in 1829 and served the French campaign in Africa during 1830 and 1831. In 1838 he became a lieutenant and in 1849 a captain. He served as Adjutant Staff with the 7th battalion of the Chasseurs in 1840.

Decaen received the Knight of the Legion of Honour on 22 April 1847. He was appointed battalion commander in the 62nd line 6 May 1850 and given command of the first battalion of the Chasseurs on 24 December 1851. He was in Algeria from 1852 until 1854.

In 1853 he became lieutenant colonel to the 11th Light and the 86th line. He was sent to Sevastopol and became Colonel of the 7th line. He was appointed brigadier general rank on 22 September 1855 . He was given command of the 2nd Brigade of the 1st Infantry Division of the 1st Corps of the Army of the East and, on 7 February 1858 he took command of an infantry brigade of the Imperial Guard.

Returning to France, he left for Italy at the head of the 2nd Brigade of the 2nd Division of the Imperial Guard. The day after the Battle of Magenta, he was raised to the rank of general of the division and took command of the 2nd Division of the 2nd Corps, replacing General Espinasse who was killed in combat.

During the War of 1870, Decaen was mortally wounded during the Battle of Borny–Colombey and died three days later.

== Legacy ==
- The Claude-Decaen street in the 12th arrondissement of Paris pays tribute to him since 1877.
- A caserne in Caen was named after him (Barracks 43rd Artillery Regiment) but is now gone. The public garden Claude Decaen was laid in the early 2000s on part of the land released by the army. His name is also passed, informally, to the district built on the remains of the military site, called "General Claude Decaen neighborhood."
