= Battle of Borny–Colombey =

Part of the Franco-Prussian War (1870)

Coordinates: 49°06′40″N 6°15′16″E

- Part of the Franco-Prussian War
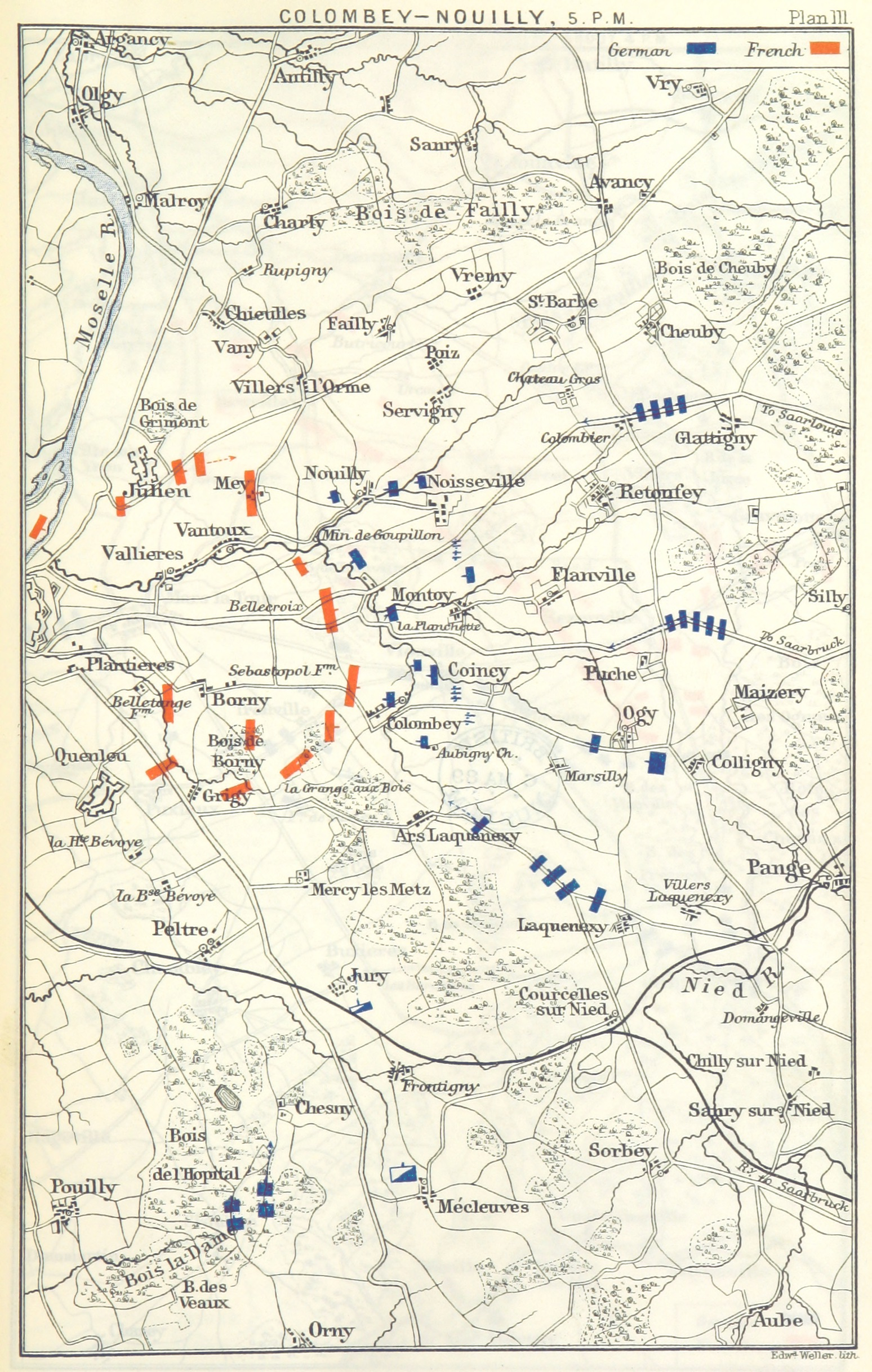
- Situation 5 PM
Date	14 August 1870
Location	Borny–Colombey, Moselle, France
Result	French victory

Belligerents
North German Confederation: Kingdom of Prussia	(Second French Empire) French Empire

Commanders and leaders
(Kingdom of Prussia) Karl Friedrich von Steinmetz	(Second French Empire) François Bazaine

Units involved
(Kingdom of Prussia) First Army	(Second French Empire) Army of the Rhine

Strength
50,000	30,000

Casualties and losses
4,906–5,222 casualties	3,608–3,915
- Grand Est Region

The Battle of Borny–Colombey or the Battle of Colombey-Nouilly took place on 14 August 1870 as part of the Franco-Prussian War. During the battle the escape route of the French army under François Bazaine was blocked when the French encountered the First Army under von Steinmetz. The outcome of the battle itself was a French victory as the French were able to escape to Metz, although they were delayed for 12 hours.

Like most of the early battles of the war, Borny was one that neither side had planned or wanted. For the French, the battle had dire consequences as they neglected to use their numerical superiority to force a passage and it delayed the Army's retreat out of Metz for twelve precious hours. This gave the Prussians the time to bring up their Second army under Prince Frederick Charles and assured that after the battles fought in the following days (Mars-la-Tour and Gravelotte) France's premier army would be trapped at Metz.
