= Battle of Sceaux =

Franco-Prussian War

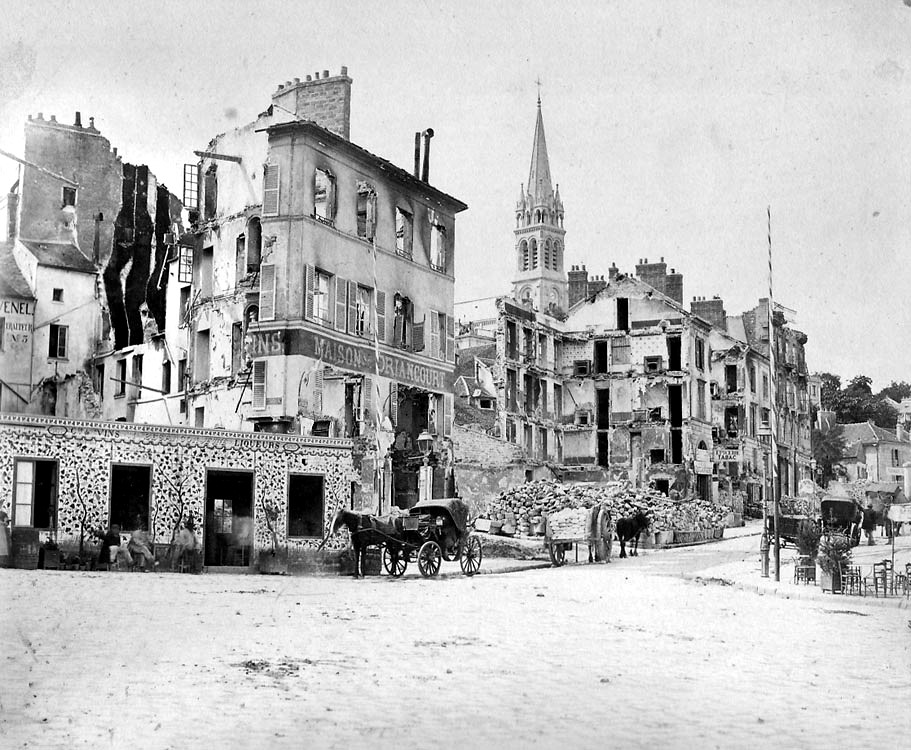
- Saint-Cloud from German bombardment after the Battle of Châtillon
Date	October 13, 1870
Location	Sceaux, Hauts-de-Seine, France
Result	Bavarian victory

Belligerents
French Republic	Kingdom of Bavaria

Commanders and leaders
Joseph Vinoy	Jakob von Hartmann

Units involved
Unknown	II Corps

Strength
25,000 men, 80 cannons	Unknown

Casualties and losses
400 casualties	Source 1 : 400 casualties Source 2 : 10 officers and 860 soldiers casualties Source 3 : 388 casualties, including 10 officers

The Battle of Sceaux took place during the Franco-Prussian War on October 13, 1870. In this battle, the German army under the command of General Jakob von Hartmann repelled the French army 's siege when Paris was under German siege, causing the French army heavy losses. Several other French breakthroughs in late 1870 were also broken by the Germans.

== The Battle ==
Two weeks after being repulsed at the Battle of Chevilly, French general Joseph Vinoy again conducted an expedition south of Paris. After a heavy artillery bombardment from the forts to the south, Vinoy sent three vertical formations towards the Clamart heights. General Von Hartmann of Germany implemented a strategy to let the enemy go too far, so that his army would surround the enemy and push them into the range of German artillery and infantry. At the beginning of the attack, the French defeated the outposts of the II corps from Châtillon and Sceaux. However, the German army had already positioned its reserve force behind the fortress of Montrouge, which would be used once the French had captured the heights at Châtillon and the Bavarian artillery positions. After a battle that lasted for about 6 hours (including the participation of the 8th and then 7th Bavarian brigade ), the German crossfire forced the French to run away. As during the French defeat at Châtillon, the French artillery on Mount Valérien made it difficult for the Bavarians to counterattack.

The next major breakout of the French army would be the Battle of Buzenval on the last month October 21, 1870, the German army would defeat the French again.
