= Battle of Chevilly =

Battle during the 1870 siege of Paris

- Part of the siege of Paris and the Franco-Prussian War
Date	September 30, 1870
Location	Chevilly, France 48°45′59″N 2°21′12″E
Result	German victory

Belligerents
North German Confederation: Prussia	France

Commanders and leaders
(Kingdom of Prussia) Wilhelm von Tümpling	Joseph Vinoy

Strength
Portions from the VI Corps	20,000 Infantry

Casualties and losses
441	2,120

The battle of Chevilly was fought during the siege of Paris. The battle was the second French sortie from Paris against the German armies. On 30 September 1870 General Joseph Vinoy attacked the Prussian VI Corps at Chevilly and was easily repulsed.

The Prussian VI Corps commanded by General von Trumpling repulsed an attempt by the French army from Paris led by General Joseph Vinoy. The French army in the battle suffered greater losses than the Prussian army.

The Crown Prince of Prussia, later Emperor Frederick III of Germany, wrote in his diary:

General Vinoy - who commanded a corps including all regular forces finally of France during the war, has conducted an "attack reconnaissance" nonsense on the left bank of the Seine on September 30, 1870: with 20,000 men, under the cannons of the fortresses of Bicêtre and Ivry, he proceeded to raid the villages of L'Hay, Chevilly and Thiaïs. The Prussian VI Corps had no difficulty crushing and forcing Vinoy's forces to flee in chaos. Due to large losses, the French requested a ceasefire for burial and sending wounded soldiers to the rear.

Two weeks after the defeat at the Battle of Chevilly, Vinoy sortied out again on October 13 in the Battle of Châtillon, which also ended in a French defeat.
