= VI Corps (German Empire) =

VI Army Corps VI. Armee-Korps
- Flag of the Staff of a Generalkommando (1871–1918)
- Active: 1815–1919
- Country: Prussia / German Empire
- Type: Corps
- Size: Approximately 44,000 (on mobilisation in 1914)
- Garrison/HQ: Breslau/Schweidnitzer Straße 24
- Shoulder strap piping: Yellow
- Engagements: Austro-Prussian War Battle of Königgrätz Franco-Prussian War Siege of Paris Battle of Chevilly World War I Battle of the Frontiers

Insignia
- Abbreviation: VI AK

The VI Army Corps / VI AK (German: VI. Armee-Korps) was a corps level command of the Prussian and then the Imperial German Armies from the 19th Century to World War I.

VI AK originated in 1815 as the General Command for the Province of Silesia, with headquarters in Breslau.

The Corps served in the Austro-Prussian War. During the Franco-Prussian War it was assigned to the 3rd Army.

In peacetime the Corps was assigned to the VIII Army Inspectorate but joined the 4th Army at the start of the First World War. It was still in existence at the end of the war. The Corps was disbanded with the demobilisation of the German Army after World War I.

== Austro-Prussian War ==
VI Corps fought in the Austro-Prussian War in 1866, seeing action in the Battle of Königgrätz.

== Franco-Prussian War ==
During the Franco-Prussian War, the Corps was initially held back in Silesia against the possibility of intervention by Austria-Hungary. It only moved up to join the 3rd Army in August 1870. It then participated in the Siege of Paris and the Battle of Chevilly.

== Peacetime organisation ==
The 25 peacetime Corps of the German Army (Guards, I - XXI, I - III Bavarian) had a reasonably standardised organisation. Each consisted of two divisions with usually two infantry brigades, one field artillery brigade and a cavalry brigade each. Each brigade normally consisted of two regiments of the appropriate type, so each Corps normally commanded 8 infantry, 4 field artillery and 4 cavalry regiments. There were exceptions to this rule:

V, VI, VII, IX and XIV Corps each had a 5th infantry brigade (so 10 infantry regiments)
II, XIII, XVIII and XXI Corps had a 9th infantry regiment
I, VI and XVI Corps had a 3rd cavalry brigade (so 6 cavalry regiments)
the Guards Corps had 11 infantry regiments (in 5 brigades) and 8 cavalry regiments (in 4 brigades).

Each Corps also directly controlled a number of other units. This could include one or more

Foot Artillery Regiment
Jäger Battalion
Pioneer Battalion
Train Battalion

Peacetime organization of the Corps
Corps	Division	Brigade	Units	Garrison
VI Corps	11th Division	21st Infantry Brigade	10th (1st Silesian) Grenadiers "King Frederick William II"	Schweidnitz
VI Corps	11th Division	21st Infantry Brigade	38th (Silesian) Fusiliers "General Field Marshal Count Moltke"	Glatz
VI Corps	11th Division	22nd Infantry Brigade	11th (2nd Silesian) Grenadiers "King Frederick III"	Breslau
VI Corps	11th Division	22nd Infantry Brigade	51st (4th Lower Silesian) Infantry	Breslau
VI Corps	11th Division	11th Field Artillery Brigade	6th (1st Silesian) Field Artillery "von Peucker"	Breslau
VI Corps	11th Division	11th Field Artillery Brigade	42nd (2nd Silesian) Field Artillery	Schweidnitz
VI Corps	11th Division	11th Cavalry Brigade	1st (Silesian) Life Cuirassiers "Great Elector"	Breslau
VI Corps	11th Division	11th Cavalry Brigade	8th (2nd Silesian) Dragoons "King Frederick III"	Öls, Kreuzburg, Bernstadt an der Weide, Namslau
VI Corps	12th Division	23rd Infantry Brigade	22nd (1st Upper Silesian) Infantry "Keith"	Gleiwitz, III Bn at Kattowitz
VI Corps	12th Division	23rd Infantry Brigade	156th (3rd Silesian) Infantry	Beuthen, III Bn at Tarnowitz
VI Corps	12th Division	24th Infantry Brigade	23rd (2nd Upper Silesian) Infantry "von Winterfeldt"	Neiße
VI Corps	12th Division	24th Infantry Brigade	62nd (3rd Upper Silesian) Infantry	Cosel, III Bn at Ratibor
VI Corps	12th Division	78th Infantry Brigade	63rd (4th Upper Silesian) Infantry	Oppeln, III Bn at Lublinitz
VI Corps	12th Division	78th Infantry Brigade	157th (4th Silesian) Infantry	Brieg
VI Corps	12th Division	12th Field Artillery Brigade	21st (1st Upper Silesian) Field Artillery "von Clausewitz"	Neiße, Grottkau
VI Corps	12th Division	12th Field Artillery Brigade	57th (2nd Upper Silesian) Field Artillery	Neustadt/Oberschlesien, Gleiwitz
VI Corps	12th Division	12th Cavalry Brigade	4th (1st Silesian) Hussars "von Schill"	Ohlau
VI Corps	12th Division	12th Cavalry Brigade	6th (2nd Silesian) Hussars "Count Götzen"	Leobschütz, Ratibor
VI Corps	12th Division	44th Cavalry Brigade	2nd (Silesian) Uhlans of Katzler	Gleiwitz, Pless
VI Corps	12th Division	44th Cavalry Brigade	11th Jäger zu Pferde	Tarnowitz, Lublinitz
VI Corps	Corps Troops		6th (2nd Silesian) Jäger Battalion	Öls
VI Corps	Corps Troops		1st Machine Gun Abteilung	Breslau
VI Corps	Corps Troops		6th (Silesian) Foot Artillery "von Dieskau"	Neiße, Glogau
VI Corps	Corps Troops		6th (Silesian) Pioneer Battalion	Neiße
VI Corps	Corps Troops		6th (Silesian) Train Battalion	Breslau
VI Corps	Breslau Defence Command (Landwehr-Inspektion)			Breslau

== World War I ==
=== Organisation on mobilisation ===
On mobilization, on 2 August 1914, the Corps was restructured. The 11th and 12th Cavalry Brigades were withdrawn to form part of the 5th Cavalry Division and the 44th Cavalry Brigade was broken up and its regiments assigned to the divisions as reconnaissance units. The 23rd Infantry Brigade was assigned to the 11th Reserve Division with VI Reserve Corps. Divisions received engineer companies and other support units from the Corps headquarters. In summary, VI Corps mobilised with 25 infantry battalions, 9 machine gun companies (54 machine guns), 8 cavalry squadrons, 24 field artillery batteries (144 guns), 4 heavy artillery batteries (16 guns), 3 pioneer companies and an aviation detachment.

Initial wartime organization of the Corps
Corps	Division	Brigade	Units
VI Corps	11th Division	21st Infantry Brigade	10th Grenadier Regiment
VI Corps	11th Division	21st Infantry Brigade	38th Fusilier Regiment
VI Corps	11th Division	22nd Infantry Brigade	11th Infantry Regiment
VI Corps	11th Division	22nd Infantry Brigade	51st Infantry Regiment
VI Corps	11th Division	22nd Infantry Brigade	6th Jäger Battalion
VI Corps	11th Division	11th Field Artillery Brigade	6th Field Artillery Regiment
VI Corps	11th Division	11th Field Artillery Brigade	42nd Field Artillery Regiment
VI Corps	11th Division		11th Jäger zu Pferde
VI Corps	11th Division		1st Company, 6th Pioneer Battalion
VI Corps	11th Division		11th Divisional Pontoon Train
VI Corps	11th Division		1st Medical Company
VI Corps	11th Division		3rd Medical Company
VI Corps	12th Division	24th Infantry Brigade	23rd Infantry Regiment
VI Corps	12th Division	24th Infantry Brigade	62nd Infantry Regiment
VI Corps	12th Division	78th Infantry Brigade	63rd Infantry Regiment
VI Corps	12th Division	78th Infantry Brigade	157th Infantry Regiment
VI Corps	12th Division	12th Field Artillery Brigade	21st Field Artillery Regiment
VI Corps	12th Division	12th Field Artillery Brigade	57th Field Artillery Regiment
VI Corps	12th Division		2nd Uhlan Regiment
VI Corps	12th Division		2nd Company, 6th Pioneer Battalion
VI Corps	12th Division		3rd Company, 6th Pioneer Battalion
VI Corps	12th Division		12th Divisional Pontoon Train
VI Corps	12th Division		2nd Medical Company
VI Corps	Corps Troops		II Battalion, 6th Foot Artillery Regiment^{a}
VI Corps	Corps Troops		13th Aviation Detachment
VI Corps	Corps Troops		6th Corps Pontoon Train
VI Corps	Corps Troops		6th Telephone Detachment
VI Corps	Corps Troops		6th Pioneer Searchlight Section
VI Corps	Corps Troops		Munition Trains and Columns corresponding to II Corps

=== Combat chronicle ===
On mobilisation, VI Corps was assigned to the 4th Army forming part of centre of the forces for the Schlieffen Plan offensive in August 1914 on the Western Front.

It was still in existence at the end of the war.

== Commanders ==
The VI Corps had the following commanders during its existence:

From	Rank	Name
15 April 1815		Friedrich Heinrich von Hünerbein
11 February 1819		Wieprecht Graf von Zieten
29 November 1839	Generalleutnant	Friedrich Wilhelm, Count Brandenburg
10 September 1849		Karl Friedrich von Lindheim
10 May 1862	General der Kavallerie	Louis Wilhelm Franz von Mutius
30 October 1866	General der Kavallerie	Wilhelm von Tümpling
27 November 1883	Generalleutnant	Karl Otto von Wichmann
23 November 1886	Generalleutnant	Oktavio von Boehn
12 January 1889	General der Artillerie	Eduard von Lewinski
21 February 1895	General der Infanterie	Erbprinz Bernhard von Sachsen-Meiningen
29 May 1903	Generalleutnant	Remus von Woyrsch
2 February 1911	General der Infanterie	Kurt von Pritzelwitz
7 November 1915	General der Kavallerie	Georg von der Marwitz
17 December 1916	General der Infanterie	Julius Riemann
23 November 1917	Generalleutnant	Konstanz von Heineccius
15 December 1918	General der Infanterie	Kurt von dem Borne
25 June 1919	Generalleutnant	Friedrich von Friedeburg

== See also ==
- Franco-Prussian War order of battle
- German Army order of battle (1914)
- List of Imperial German infantry regiments
- List of Imperial German artillery regiments
- List of Imperial German cavalry regiments

== Footnotes ==
a.This might be a typographical error in the source, as II Btn is also listed (alongside I Btn) as 5th Army Artillery

== Bibliography ==
- Cron, Hermann (2002). Imperial German Army 1914-18: Organisation, Structure, Orders-of-Battle [first published: 1937]. Helion & Co. ISBN 1-874622-70-1.
- Ellis, John; Cox, Michael (1993). The World War I Databook. Aurum Press Ltd. ISBN 1-85410-766-6.
- Haythornthwaite, Philip J. (1996). The World War One Source Book. Arms and Armour. ISBN 1-85409-351-7.
- Histories of Two Hundred and Fifty-One Divisions of the German Army which Participated in the War (1914–1918), compiled from records of Intelligence section of the General Staff, American Expeditionary Forces, at General Headquarters, Chaumont, France 1919. The London Stamp Exchange Ltd. 1989 [1920]. ISBN 0-948130-87-3.
- The German Forces in the Field; 7th Revision, 11th November 1918; Compiled by the General Staff, War Office. Imperial War Museum, London and the Battery Press. 1995 [1918]. ISBN 978-1-870423-95-3.
