= Wilhelm von Tümpling =

Prussian General der Kavallerie (1809–1884)

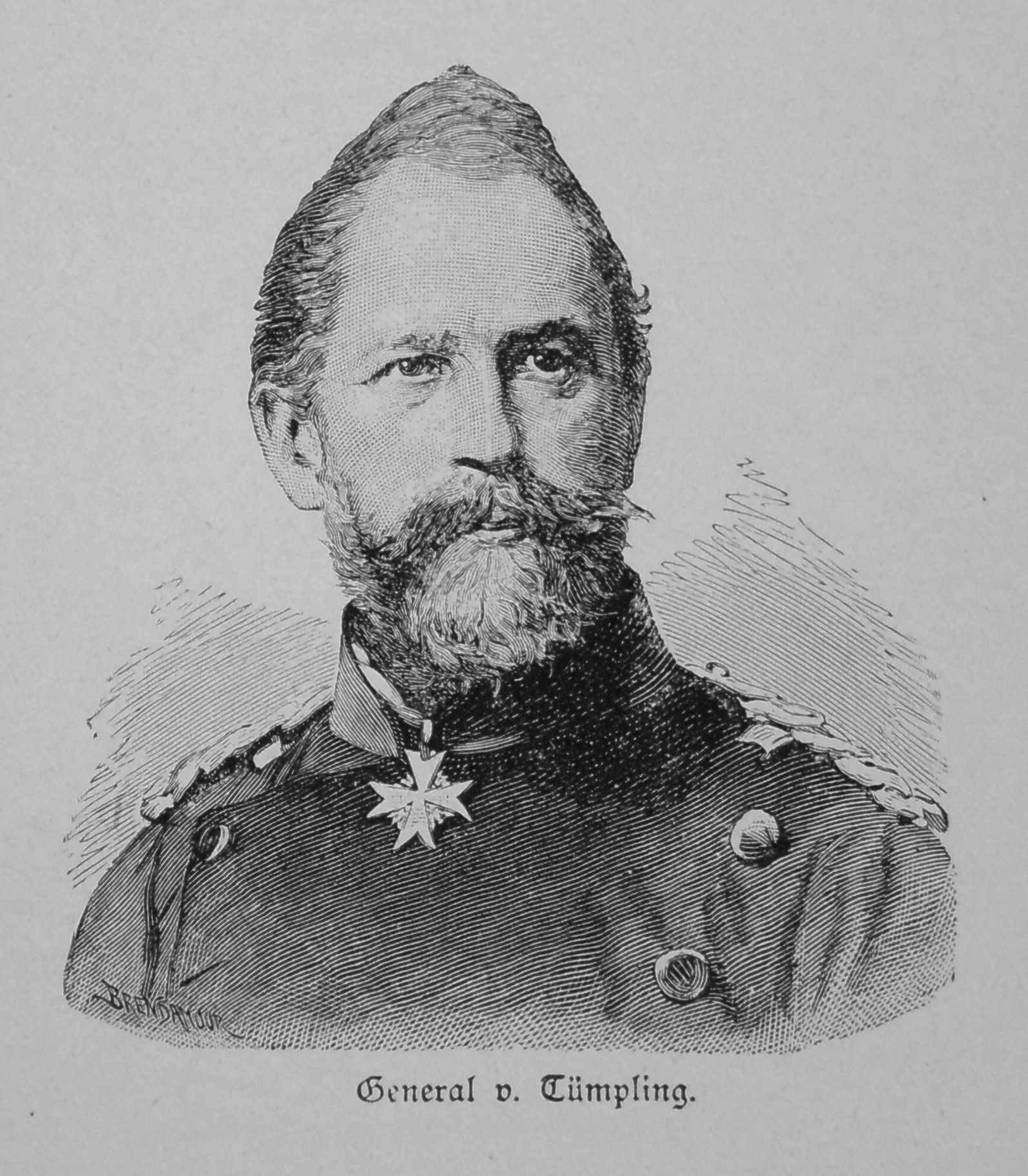
Wilhelm Ludwig Karl Kurt Friedrich von Tümpling

Wilhelm Ludwig Karl Kurt Friedrich von Tümpling (30 December 1809 – 13 February 1884) was a Prussian General der Kavallerie. Tümpling commanded a division in the Austro-Prussian War and VI Army Corps during the Franco-Prussian War.

== Biography ==
Born in Pasewalk in the Prussian Province of Pomerania as a scion of the noble family von Tümpling, Wilhelm initially opted for a civilian career and studied law at Heidelberg University.

On 25 July 1830 he entered the Guard Corps as a candidate-officer and on 18 June 1831 he was appointed second lieutenant. In the fall of 1833 he went to the war school and in 1837 was appointed to the topographical office. From 1839 he belonged to the general staff. In 1840 he was promoted to first lieutenant. On 12 April 1842, he was appointed to the General Staff of the VIII Army Corps in Koblenz with the rank of captain. From there, in 1848, now promoted to major, he was transferred to the Great General Staff in Berlin. In 1849 he took part in the campaign in Baden.

In 1850 he was again in the field, first as a staff officer in the 4th Dragoons Regiment, and in 1853 with his own command in the 5th Cuirassier Regiment. In 1854 Tümpling took command of the 1st Guard Uhlan Regiment in Potsdam. At the end of 1857 he was appointed colonel and commander of the 11th Cavalry Brigade in Breslau. Tümpling stayed there until in 1863 he took over the 5th division in Frankfurt an der Oder.

In the Second Schleswig War in 1864, parts of his division came into combat at the Düppeler Schanzen and the occupation of Fehmarn, but he was not personally involved. During the Austro-Prussian War in 1866 Tümpling distinguished himself in the Battle of Gitschin, where he was wounded. For Gitschin he was awarded the Pour le Mérite. After the war he was governor-general of the occupied Kingdom of Saxony for a few weeks. In October 1866 Tümpling was given command of the VI Army Corps.

At the beginning of the Franco-Prussian War the VI Army Corps was kept in Silesia in order to be a deterrent to Austria entering the war on the French side. After it became clear that Austria would not participate in the war, the corps moved to France in August 1870 and was assigned to the 3rd Army. When the 3rd Army moved north towards Sedan, Tümpling remained as flank protection. His task was to intercept retreating French formations so that they could not get to Paris. The French 13th Corps, however, managed to escape this trap and reach Paris. During the Siege of Paris, Tümpling held the southwestern section. In this area he was able to fight back a French outage in the Battle of Chevilly.

After the war, Tümpling returned to Breslau with his corps. In 1883 Tümpling retired from the army due to his poor health, and eventually died in 1884 in Talstein near Jena.

== Honours and awards ==
- Kingdom of Prussia:
  - Knight of Honour of the Johanniter Order, 1847; Knight of Justice, 1858
  - Knight of the Order of the Red Eagle, 4th Class with Swords, 1849; Grand Cross with Oak Leaves and Swords on Ring, 2 September 1873
  - Knight of the Royal Order of the Crown, 2nd Class, 14 November 1861
  - Commander's Cross of the Royal House Order of Hohenzollern, 7 December 1864
  - Service Award Cross
  - Pour le Mérite (military), 20 September 1866
  - Iron Cross (1870), 1st Class with 2nd Class on Black Band
  - Knight of the Order of the Black Eagle, 18 September 1875; with Collar, 1876; with Diamonds 22 November 1883
- Baden: Commander of the Order of the Zähringer Lion, 2nd Class, 1850
- Kingdom of Bavaria: Grand Cross of the Military Merit Order
- Denmark: Knight of the Order of the Dannebrog, 16 April 1841
- Mecklenburg:
  - Grand Cross of the House Order of the Wendish Crown, with Golden Crown
  - Military Merit Cross, 2nd Class (Schwerin)
- Nassau: Commander of the Order of Adolphe of Nassau, 1st Class, September 1861
- Russian Empire:
  - Knight of the Order of St. Anna, 2nd Class
  - Knight of the Order of St. Stanislaus, 1st Class
- Kingdom of Saxony: Grand Cross of the Albert Order, 1872
- Württemberg: Grand Cross of the Military Merit Order, 30 December 1870

== Literature ==
- Howard, Michael, The Franco-Prussian War: The German Invasion of France 1870–1871, New York: Routledge, 2001. ISBN 0-415-26671-8.
- Wawro, Geoffrey, The Austro-Prussian War. Austria's war with Prussia and Italy in 1866 (New York 2007)
- von Poten, Bernard, Tümpling, Wilhelm von. in Allgemeine Deutsche Biographie (ADB). Band 38, Duncker & Humblot, Leipzig 1894, S. 785–787.
