= Chevilly-Larue =

- Commune
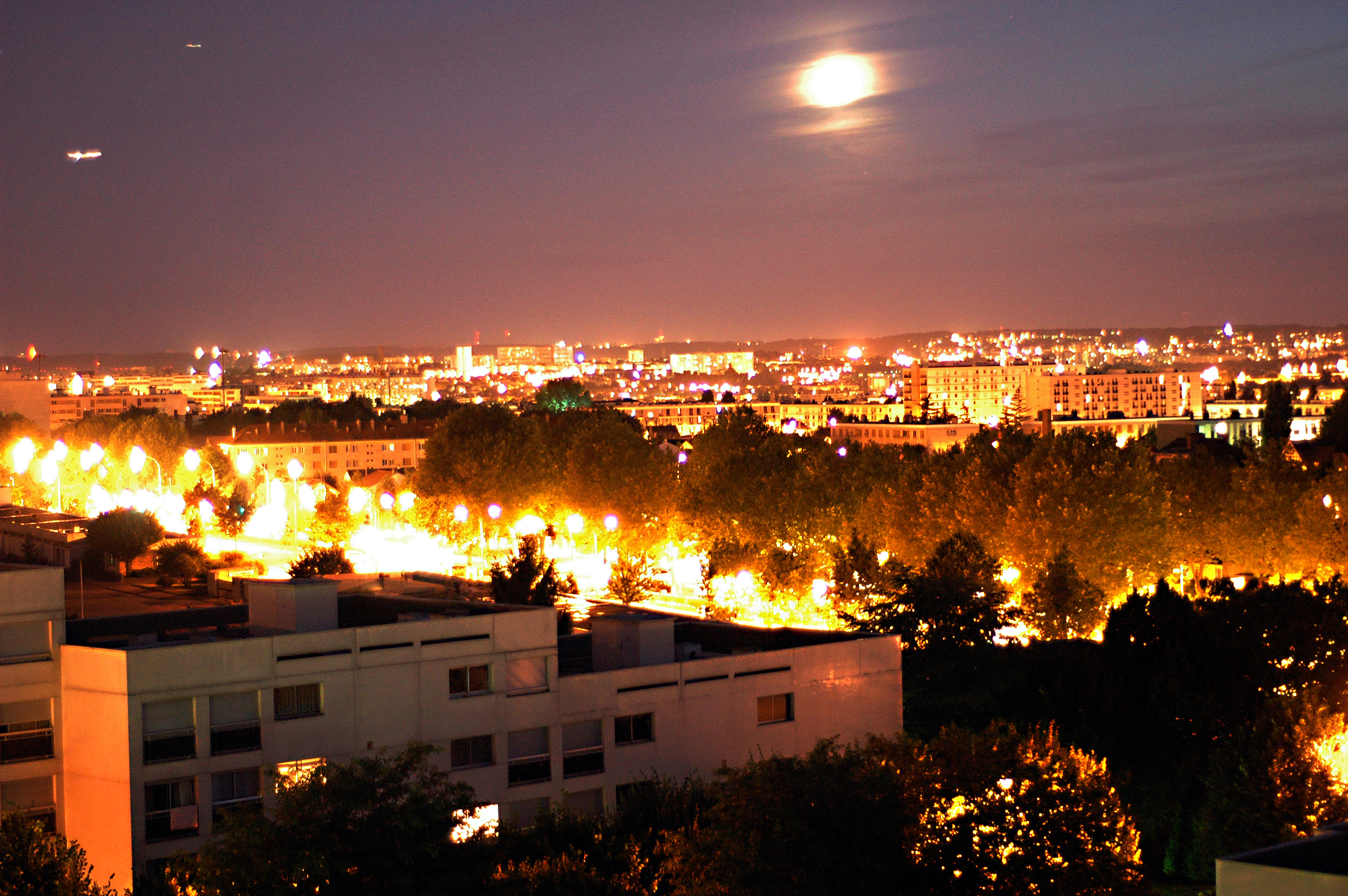
- A view of Chevilly-Larue at night

- Coat of arms

- Location (in red) within Paris inner suburbs
- Location of Chevilly-Larue
- Location within France Location within Île-de-France (region)
- Coordinates: 48°45′59″N 2°21′12″E
- Country: France
- Region: Île-de-France
- Department: Val-de-Marne
- Arrondissement: L'Haÿ-les-Roses
- Canton: Thiais
- Intercommunality: Grand Paris

Government
  - Mayor (2026–32): Stéphanie Daumin
- Area^{1}: 4.22 km^{2} (1.63 sq mi)
- Highest elevation: 94 m (308 ft)
- Lowest elevation: 83 m (272 ft)
- Population (2023): 19,826
  - Density: 4,700/km^{2} (12,200/sq mi)
- Time zone: UTC+01:00 (CET)
  - Summer (DST): UTC+02:00 (CEST)
- INSEE/Postal code: 94021 /94550
- ^{1} French Land Register data, which excludes lakes, ponds, glaciers > 1 km^{2} (0.386 sq mi or 247 acres) and river estuaries.

Chevilly-Larue (French pronunciation: [ʃəviji laʁy]) is a commune in the southern suburbs of Paris, France. It is located 9.3 km (5.8 mi) from the center of Paris.

== Name ==
Chevilly-Larue was originally called simply Chevilly. The name Chevilly was recorded for the first time in 829 (in a donation by Eucade, bishop of Paris) as Civiliacum, probably meaning "estate of Civilis", a Gallo-Roman landowner.

On 5 September 1921 the name of the commune officially became Chevilly-Larue in order to distinguish it from the homonymous commune of Chevilly in the Loiret département. Larue was a hamlet located within the commune. Founded at the end of the Hundred Years' War along the small road from L'Haÿ-les-Roses to Fresnes, it was originally called La Ruelle (meaning "the lane", the "alleyway"), later corrupted into La Rue and eventually Larue.

== Geography ==
Neighboring communes: L'Haÿ-les-Roses, Fresnes, Rungis, Thiais and Vitry-sur-Seine.

== Transport ==
Chevilly-Larue is served by no station of the Paris Métro, RER, or suburban rail network. The closest station to Chevilly-Larue is Villejuif – Louis Aragon station on Métro line. This station is located in the neighboring commune of Villejuif, 2.3 km (1.4 mi) from the town center of Chevilly-Larue.

At the end of 2010, a project was put in discussion as to the extension of Paris Métro Line 14 and implantation of two stations in the commune. This project has also been adopted as part of the Grand Paris Express project; the commune will be served, by 2027, by two metro stations: "MIN porte de Thiais" in the south and "Chevilly Trois Communes" located in L'Haÿ-les-Roses in the north.

== Population ==
Historical population
Year	Pop.	±% p.a.
1968	16,168	—
1975	17,687	+1.29%
1982	16,026	−1.40%
1990	16,223	+0.15%
1999	18,149	+1.25%
2007	19,152	+0.67%
2012	18,786	−0.39%
2017	19,491	+0.74%
2023	19,826	+0.28%
Source: INSEE

== Education ==
Schools in the commune include:

- Two preschools: Ecole maternelle Jacques-Gilbert Collet, Ecole maternelle Pasteur, Ecole maternelle Paul Bert, Ecole maternelle Pierre et Marie Curie, Ecole maternelle Frida Kahlo and Ecole maternelle Salvador Allende.
- Three primary school groups: Groupe scolaire Pasteur, Groupe scolaire Paul Bert, Groupe scolaire Pierre et Marie Curie and Groupe scolaire Frida Kahlo.
- Two junior high schools: Collège Jean Moulin and Collège Liberté
- One senior high school/sixth-form college: Lycée polyvalent Pauline Roland Chevilly-Larue

The Holy Ghost Fathers had a seminary in Chevilly.

== See also ==
- Communes of the Val-de-Marne department
- Battle of Chevilly (1870)
