= Lycée polyvalent Pauline Roland =

Senior high school in France

Lycée polyvalent Pauline Roland is a senior high school/sixth-form college in the Nord/Ouest neighbourhood of Chevilly-Larue, Val-de-Marne, France, in the Paris metropolitan area. It is in proximity to the border with l'Haÿ-les-Roses. The school building has a capacity of 1,188 students.

== History ==
46 years passed since initial attempts to open a lycée in Chevilly-Larue; the school finally opened on 5 September 2011.

The school was officially inaugurated on 19 November 2012.
