= David W. Ball =

American author

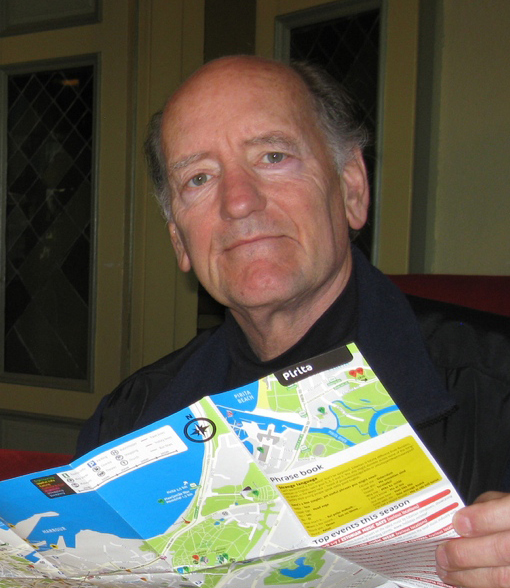
- David W. Ball in Tallinn, Estonia, 2013
- Born: David Wadsworth Ball; September 12, 1949 (age 76); Denver, Colorado, U.S.
- Education: Metropolitan State University of Denver; Columbia University Graduate School of Journalism
- Occupations: Author, short story writer
- Spouse: Melinda Stivers Leach
- Children: Benjamin A.W. Ball and Elizabeth X.S. Ball
- Writing career
- Period: 1999–present
- Genres: Historical fiction, suspense, short story
- Website: www.davidwball.com

David Wadsworth Ball (born September 12, 1949) is an American author whose novels include Empires of Sand (1999), China Run (2002) and Ironfire (2004). His short story, The Scroll, was published in Warriors (2010), and Warriors 2 (2010), anthologies assembled by George R.R. Martin and Gardner Dozois. The short story Provenance was included in an anthology entitled Rogues, published by Bantam Spectra in 2014.

Ball's works have been translated into 11 languages. Ball is currently working on his fourth novel.

== Early life and education ==
Ball, a native of Denver, Colorado, was the middle of five children born to Carol and Jack Ball. His father Jack served in World War II as a pilot, first in the Royal Air Force and then the US Navy.

Ball earned a bachelor's degree in political science from Metropolitan State University, Denver, where he was editor of the campus newspaper and active in student politics. He earned a master's of science degree in journalism from Columbia University Graduate School of Journalism in 1973.

== Career ==
Ball has traveled extensively, visiting more than 65 countries on six continents. He has been a pilot, sarcophagus maker, businessman and charity organizer. He drove a taxi in New York City and built a road in West Africa. He installed telecommunications equipment in Cameroun, renovated Victorian houses in Denver and pumped gasoline in the Grand Tetons. Trained in journalism but wishing to write fiction, Ball seriously began work on Empires of Sand in 1994, recovering 100 pages of a manuscript he had written in a Tunisian beach house in 1984 while traveling in North Africa, but later shelving the work to go into business.

Empires of Sand, (Bantam 1999), is a historical novel set in the Sahara Desert and 19th-century Paris. The first half of the story involves two cousins growing up during the Prussian Siege of Paris. The narrative shifts to the Sahara in the 1880s, during an ill-fated attempt by the French to drive a railroad through the heart of the desert. The expedition was slaughtered by the Tuareg, a Berber tribe more commonly known as the Blue Men. The book was released in paperback in 2001 (Dell) and as an audio-book. The novel has been translated into French, Spanish, German, Serbian, Dutch, Czech, and Turkish. In the course of researching the book, Ball traveled four times to the Sahara, including once on a 50cc motorcycle across the Hoggar, a remote mountainous region of the Algerian desert, where he stayed with the Tuareg.

His second novel, China Run (Simon & Schuster 2002), a contemporary thriller inspired by a true-life incident, is the story of an American woman fleeing the Chinese authorities across remote regions of China with an adopted infant daughter whom the authorities are attempting to take away from her. The novel was based on China's one-child policy. Research for the book took Ball from Shanghai to Hong Kong, including a trip up the Yangtze on a broken-down riverboat, across the Poyang Hu lake in a fishing boat, and through the rugged mountains and forests of south China to Hong Kong.

Dubbed "a wonderfully orchestrated novel of suspense", China Run was translated into Latvian, Hungarian, German, Czech and French and was produced as an audio-book. It was a featured alternate of the Book-of-the-Month Club, the Mystery Guild, the Literary Guild, and the Doubleday Book Club.

Ball's third novel, Ironfire (Delacorte Press 2004), is set during the Great Siege of Malta in 1565, in which the Ottoman sultan, Suleiman the Magnificent, launched a war fleet against the island of Malta, bastion of the Hospitaller Knights of St. John. More broadly the book details life in the 16th century Mediterranean, from the slave markets of Algiers to the noble houses of France, from the Topkapi seraglio in Istanbul to the great sea battles between galleys. Ball spent several years researching the book in Paris, Valletta, Istanbul, and Algeria.

Selected as one of the "great reads" for the 2004 holiday season by the Rocky Mountain News, Ironfire was published in Great Britain and the Commonwealth nations as The Sword and the Scimitar. It was translated into Turkish, Spanish, Serbian, Polish, Greek, German, and French, and released in paperback, audio, and e-book editions.

The Scroll is Ball's short story published in an anthology, Warriors, edited by George R.R. Martin and Gardner Dozois (Tor 2010). It also was a part of Warriors 2, a paperback edition, and was recorded in an audio edition.

Ball currently is working on his fourth novel about art and Occupied Paris. He recently completed a short story that will be included in a cross-genre anthology entitled Rogues to be published by Bantam Spectra in 2014.

== Personal life ==
In July 1983, Ball met Melinda Stivers Leach. They live on a farm east of Boulder, Colorado, and have two children, Benjamin and Elizabeth. Ball has lived, worked, and conducted research in Europe, Asia, Africa, Australia and the Americas. He explored the Andes in a Volkswagen bus and crossed the Sahara Desert four times, getting lost only once. His interests include skiing, fly-fishing, baseball, and opera.

== Works ==
=== Novels ===
- Empires of Sand (1999) ISBN 0-553-11014-4
- China Run (2002) ISBN 0743227433
- Ironfire (2004) ISBN 0-385-33601-2 (also published as The Sword and the Scimitar, Random House UK: ISBN 0091799414)

=== Short stories ===
- The Scroll Included in Warriors, Tor, 2010, ISBN 978-0-7653-2048-3
- Provenance Included in Rogues, (scheduled publication 2014)

== Recognition ==
China Run was the One Book, One Community selection for the Amelia Island (Florida) Book Festival in 2002.

Ironfire was nominated by the Colorado Center of the Book for Best Fiction work in 2004.

Warriors won the 2011 Locus Poll Award for Best Original Anthology.
