= Kurt von dem Borne =

Prussian military officer (1857–1933)

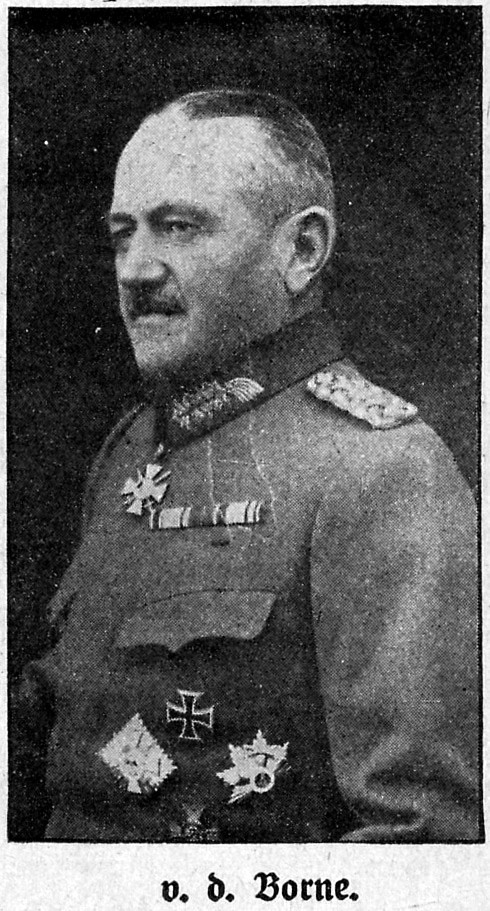
- von dem Born in 1918.
- Born: 19 May 1857; Frankfurt (Oder), Province of Brandenburg, Kingdom of Prussia, German Confederation
- Died: 22 November 1933 (aged 76); Berlin-Wannsee, German Reich
- Relatives: ∞ 1882 Marie Henschel ∞ 1905 Auguste Henschel
- Military career
- Allegiance: Kingdom of Prussia; German Empire; Weimar Republic
- Branch: Prussian Army; Imperial German Army; Reichsheer
- Service years: 1874–1919
- Rank: General der Infanterie
- Unit: 13th Division
- Commands: VI Reserve Corps; VI Corps
- Conflicts: See battles: First World War; Battle of La Bassée; Battle of Liège; Battle of Soissons
- Awards: Pour le Mérite

Kurt Gotthelf Kreuzwendedich von dem Borne (19 May 1857 – 22 November 1933) was a Prussian General der Infanterie. He was most notable for his commanding positions during the First World War, including the 13th Division, the VI Reserve Corps and VI Corps.

Born in Frankfurt (Oder), Borne was born into two Prussian noble families. He attended training the cadet corps, before commanding a series of infantry regiments and working as an instructor at the Prussian Staff College and Danzig's Kriegsschule. At the start of the First World War, he led the 13th Division into the invasion of Belgium, and then moved towards France to the Sambre. He then participated, after being appointed Commander of the VI. Reserve Corps in 1917, in some operations in France. In 1918, he became Commander of the VI Corps and Commander of Armeeoberkommando Süd. With the Armeeoberkommando, he helped plan attack an attack on Poland through the south before the plan was abandoned after civil unrest in Germany, and he retired shortly after.

== Early life ==
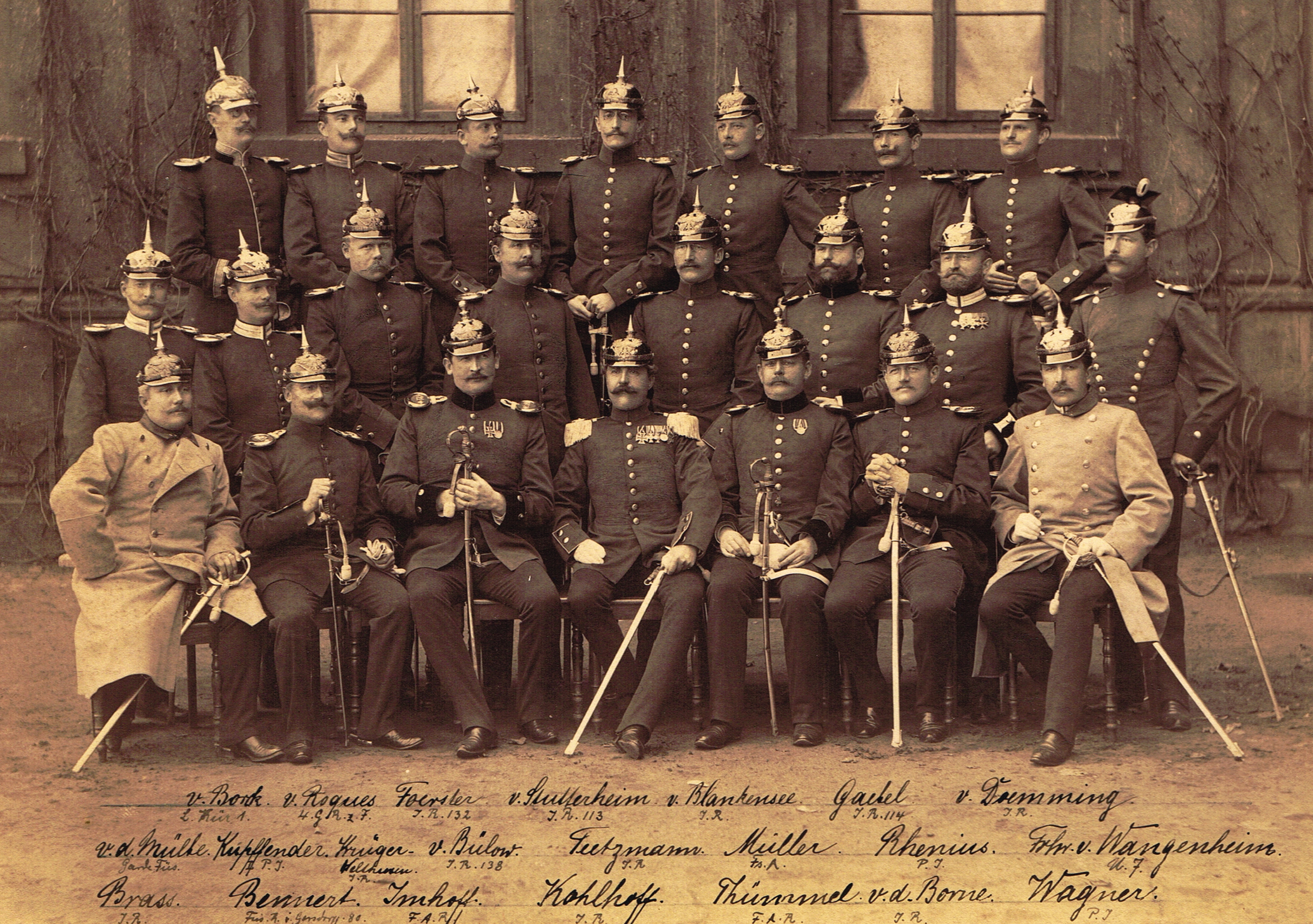
Borne at a Prussian Kriegsschule in 1899. He is in the third row, second to the right.

Von dem Borne was born on 19 May 1857 in Frankfurt (Oder), at the time in the Province of Brandenburg in Prussia. He was the child of Prussian Major Albert Ferdinand Woteslaw von dem Borne (1804–1883) and his second wife (∞ 1844) Mathilde Friederike Malwine Emilie Viktoria, née von Waldow. He had one older brother, Hermann Gotthelf Kreuzwendedich (1850–1923), who was 7 years older than him and also went into the military, becoming a lieutenant general. He also had two sisters: Friederike "Frida" Wilhelmine Henriette Auguste Charlotte (1848–1891) and Mathilde (1854–1863).

Kurt attended a Gymnasium in Frankfurt until 1869, when he was transferred to the cadet corps. He first attended the cadet institute at Wahlstatt until 1874, he then attended Royal Prussian Main Cadet's Institute in Groß-Lichterfelde near Berlin until 1874.

== Military career ==
After graduating from the cadet academy on 23 April 1874, von dem Borne was commissioned with the rank of second lieutenant in the 8th Company/3rd Electoral Hessian Infantry Regiment No. 83 in Kassel. He was transferred to the 4th Pomeranian Infantry Regiment No. 21 in Bromberg on 29 April 1879. In 1882, he was transferred to the Prussian Staff College before going to the 1st Magdeburg Infantry Regiment No. 26 in 1888. In 1889, he was at the 1st Hessian Infantry Regiment No. 81. In 1903, he was appointed commander of the Danzig Kriegsschule, and in 1913 became commander of the 13th Division.

=== World War I ===
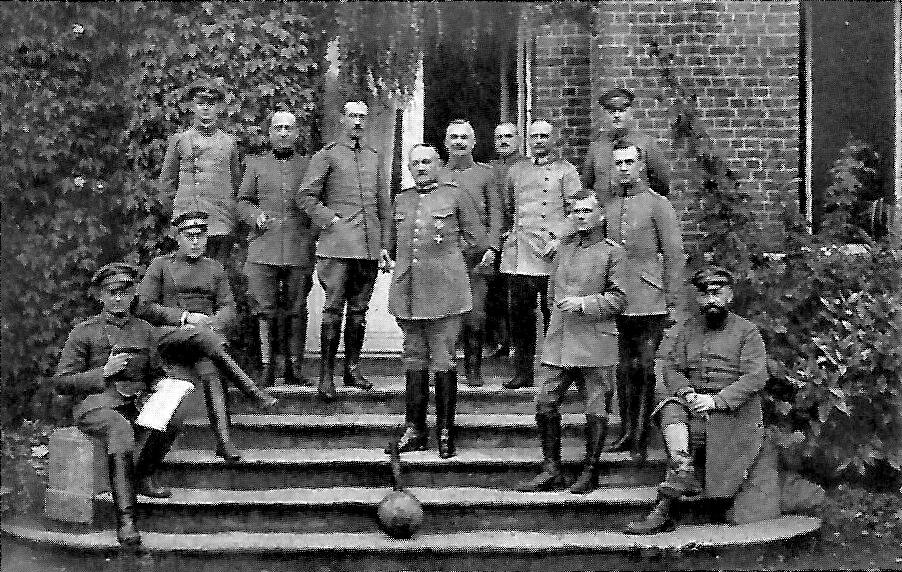
The 13th Division in 1916. Borne is in the middle.

He was attached to be Commander of the 13th Division as they fought in the invasion of Belgium, becoming temporary commander of the VII. Army Corps during the Battle of Liège, before going to France. He participated in the initial preparations for the First Battle of the Marne at the Battle of St. Quentin in August 1914, after Karl von Bülow called his division in as the last reserves.

Von Bülow "fed their reserves into wherever the French threatened", in order to not break the 2nd Army's front, which ultimately failed. During October 1914, Borne participated in the Battle of La Bassée with his unit. In December 1914, under Eberhard von Claer, Borne's 13th Division began to move towards the British line held by the British IV Corps to solidify Germany's position. He then moved towards Aubenton alongside Karl von Einem to occupy the south of the Sambre in March 1915.

On 10 February 1917, he was put in charge of the VI. Reserve Corps. His reserve corps, under the 17th Army, were assigned to attack on 21 March 1918 during Operation Michael. Borne also participated in the Battle of Soissons, with his corps as back up. On 18 April 1918 he was promoted to General der Infanterie. Prior to this he had been a lieutenant general.

On 20 December 1918, he was appointed Commander of the VI Corps. Simultaneously, Borne was assigned to the Greater Polish Uprising, becoming Commander of Armeeoberkommando Süd on 10 January 1919. He commanded about 106 thousand soldiers in this role, and he was supported by Fritz von Lossberg. In March 1919 he received orders from the Armeeoberkommando to undertake an operation called Stellungskrieg, where he was assigned to attack Poland through the south, advancing from Lower Silesia towards Kalisz. However, this plan was abandoned after the social "unrest" in Germany made the plan impossible.

== Post World War I ==
On 28 June 1919, he transferred away from the VI Corps at his own request, because of his outspokenness against the terms of the Treaty of Versailles, which Germany had signed that day. On 10 July 1919, he retired from the Preliminary Reichswehr.

== Death ==
General (Ret.) von dem Borne died on 22 November 1933. He was 76.

== Personal life ==
On 28 September 1882 in Kronjanten, 1st Lieutenant von dem Borne married his fiancée Marie Emilie Auguste Ernestine Henschel (1859–1901). They would have five children:

- Walter Gotthelf Kreuzwendedich (born 4 August 1883 in Kronjanten; d. 16 March 1885 in Berlin)
- Charlotte Ida Mathilde (born 17 July 1884 in Berlin; d. 17 September 1884 ibidem)
- Kurt Gotthelf Kreuzwendedich (1885–1946), Vizeadmiral of the Kriegsmarine in WWII
- Annemarie (born 15 December 1887 in Berlin); ∞ 1920 Dr. jur. Ludwig von Reiche
- Dietrich Gotthelf Kreuzwendedich (1891–1916), 1st Lieutenant of the Prussian Army, aerial observer of the Fliegertruppe in WWI, killed on 29 July 1916 near Gent after his plane crashed

On 24 January 1905 in Hagen (West Prussia), widower Lieutenant Colonel von dem Borne married his sister-in-law Auguste Wilhelmine Emilie Ida Henschel (b. 30 July 1862 in Grünsberg).

== Promotions ==
- 23 April 1874 Seconde-Lieutenant (2nd Lieutenant) without Patent (ernannt)
  - 19 May 1874 received Patent
  - 29 April 1879 received improved Patent from 19 May 1873
- 14 March 1882 Premier-Lieutenant without Patent (ernannt)
  - 5 October 1882 received Patent
- 29 November 1888 Hauptmann (Captain)
- 27 January 1898 Major
- 20 July 1904 Oberstleutnant (Lieutenant Colonel)
- 14 April 1907 Oberst (Colonel)
- 20 March 1911 Generalmajor (Major General)
- 1 October 1913 Generalleutnant (Lieutenant General)
  - as such he also received the title "Exzellenz" (Excellence)
- 18 April 1918 General der Infanterie (General of the Infantry)

== Awards and decorations (excerpt) ==
- Order of the Crown Second Class with Star
- Service Award Cross
- Officer's Cross of Honour of the Lippe House Order
- Order of the Sword Commander 1st Class
- Iron Cross First and Second Class (1914)
- Pour le Mérite (9 April 1918), with oakleaves (7 November 1918)
- Order of the Red Eagle First Class, with Oak Leaves and Swords (1918)
