= Empires of Sand =

1999 novel by David W. Ball

- Author: David W. Ball
- Language: English
- Publication date: 1999

Empires of Sand is a 1999 novel by American writer David W. Ball. It tells the story of two cousins who grow up together in Paris but are separated during the Franco-Prussian War. The second half of the novel concerns their adventures in French Algeria, one cousin living with a Tuareg tribe, the other a French lieutenant on the real-life Flatters Expedition, an ill-fated mission initiated by the French government in 1881 to survey a railway route through the Hoggar region of the Sahara desert. Most of the expedition's members were slaughtered by the Tuareg.

== Reviews ==
Reviews were generally positive.

- Franscell, Ron (July 29, 1999). "A tale of two cousins in the desert". Christian Science Monitor. Vol. 91, no. 170. p. 17. ISSN 0882-7729.
- Duncan, Melanie (June 1–15, 1999). "(Book review) Empires of Sand". Booklist. Vol. 95, no. 19/20. p. 1740. ISSN 0006-7385.
- "(Book review) Empires of Sand". Publishers Weekly. June 14, 1999. p. 45.
- Johnson, Cynthia (July 1, 1999). "Book Reviews: Fiction. Ball, David. Empires of Sand". Library Journal. Vol. 124, no. 12.
- Book Review Digest. Vol. 97. H. W. Wilson Company. 2002. p. 95.
- "Empires of Sand by David Ball". www.fantasticfiction.com.
- "Empires of Sand by David Ball : All About Romance %". All About Romance.
- "Туареги - воинственные кочевники Сахары, которых никто не мог покорить – Мир Знаний" [Tuaregs - warlike nomads of the Sahara, whom no one could conquer - World of Knowledge] (in Russian). February 3, 2020. Archived from the original on October 20, 2020.
