= Joseph Vinoy =

French general (1803–1880)

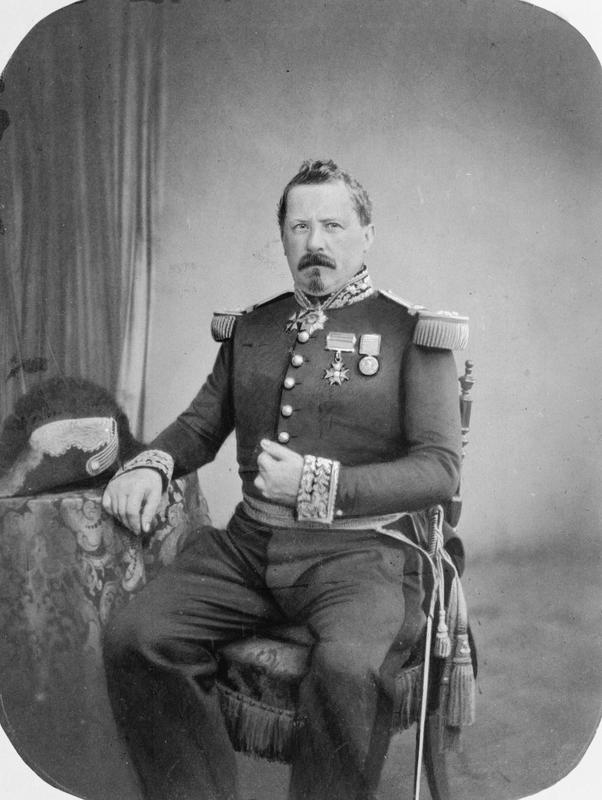
- Joseph Vinoy
- Born: 10 August 1803; Saint-Étienne-de-Saint-Geoirs, France
- Died: 27 April 1880 (aged 76); Paris, France
- Military career
- Allegiance: Bourbon Restoration (France) July Monarchy; French Second Republic; Second French Empire
- Branch: French Army
- Service years: 1823–?
- Rank: Général de Division
- Conflicts: Conquest of Algeria; Crimean War; Franco-Prussian War
- Awards: Legion of Honour (Grand Chanceliers)

Joseph Vinoy (French pronunciation: [ʒozɛf vinwa]; 10 August 1803 – 27 April 1880) was a French soldier, who commanded the French capital's defenses during the siege of Paris in the course of the Franco-Prussian War.

== Biography ==
He originally intended to join the Church, but, after some years at a seminary, he decided upon a military career and joined the French army in 1823. As a sergeant in the 14th line infantry, he took part in the Algerian expedition of 1830. He won his commission at the capture of Algiers and during the subsequent campaigns rose to the rank of Colonel. He returned to France in 1850. In the Crimean War, he served under François Certain Canrobert as general of brigade. For his brilliant conduct at the Battle of Malakoff in 1855 he was promoted to General of division. He later led a division of Adolphe Niel's corps in the Battle of Solférino.

Retired on account of his age in 1865, he was recalled to active service on the outbreak of the Franco-Prussian War in 1870. After the early reverses he was made head of the XIII army corps, which did not arrive at the front in time to be involved in the catastrophe of Sedan. By a skillful retreat he brought his corps intact to Paris on September 7. During the Siege of Paris, Vinoy commanded the III army operating on the south side of the capital and took part in all the actions in that quarter. On Louis Jules Trochu's resignation he was appointed to the supreme command, in which capacity he negotiated France's surrender.

During the Paris Commune, he held important commands in the army of Versailles, occupying the burning Tuileries and the Louvre on May 23, 1871. He was subsequently made a Grand Chancellor of the Legion of Honour.

Vinoy wrote several memoirs of the Franco-Prussian War: Operations de l'armée pendant le siege de Paris (1872); L'Armistice et la commune (1872); and L'Armée française (1873).

The Municipality of Vinoy in Quebec, Canada, was named in his honour (since 1996 part of the Municipality of Chénéville).
