= Battle of Châtillon =

Skirmish during the 1870 siege of Paris

Coordinates: 48.8000°N 2.2900°E

- Part of the Franco-Prussian War – Siege of Paris
Date	13 October 1870
Location	Châtillon, Hauts-de-Seine, Île-de-France
Result	German victory

Belligerents
North German Confederation: Prussia; Bavaria	French Republic

Commanders and leaders
Hugo von Kirchbach; Jakob von Hartmann	Auguste-Alexandre Ducrot; General Renault

Units involved
II Corps; V Corps	XIV Corps

Strength
100,000	28,000–40,000 troops (among them Garde Mobile soldiers)

Casualties and losses
Bavaria: 13 officers and 252 soldiers casualties Prussia: 6 officers and 172 soldiers casualties	Source 1: 4 officers and 94 soldiers were killed, 28 officers and 535 soldiers were injured, 62 people missing Source 2: 661 troops killed, over 300 soldiers arrested In addition, 9 fire cannons seized

The battle of Châtillon, also known as the battle of Châtillon-sous-Bagneux, was a skirmish in the siege of Paris between France and North German Confederation in the Franco-Prussian War, took place on 13 October 1870. This is also considered the first battle in the history of the French Third Republic. In this fierce battle – occurred at Châtillon and Sceaux, Corps V of the Prussian army under the command of Lieutenant General Infantry Hugo von Kirchbach, along with the II Corps of the Kingdom of Bavaria by the Supreme Minister infantry Jakob von Hartmann which were the forces of the army Group 3 of Prussia by Prince Friedrich Wilhelm as General command., won a victory against an attack by the XIV Corps under General Renault - of the French army under General Auguste-Alexandre Ducrot. Although some soldiers under Ducrot fought well, the majority of his army became agitated. The French were forced to flee to Paris, losing the Châtillon Plateau - a very favorable defensive position overlooking the fortresses south of Paris - to the Germans. This was a disaster for the "justice" of the French army during the war, although the French reported that they suffered only minor losses.

The Battle of Sedan between the German and French armies on 1–2 September 1870 ended with the defeat of the Second French Empire. The victory in Sedan opened the way for the Germans to enter Paris, and on 4 September an uprising in Paris overthrew the Empire and led to the establishment of the Government of National Defense. Meanwhile, under the orders of Chief of the General Staff Helmuth von Moltke the Great, the German 3rd and Maas armies set out to attack Paris five days after the great victory at Sedan. Until 19 September the Prussian V Army commanded by General Von Kirchbach marched in two vertical formations to the Palace of Versailles . The French were determined to keep control of the important points in front of the capital's fortifications, and in view of the Prussian presence in the Châtillon plateau, French general Ducrot launching a breakout on the frontline of the V Corps: At dawn on 19 September, two divisions of infantry of Corps XIV of France had invaded Petit Bicêtre and Villacoublay. With strong artillery support, they drove out the German outposts (Division number 9 of Prussia), although the Germans initially defended successfully. However, although Hartmann's II Bavarian Army advanced in a different direction, their 1st Infantry Brigade was brought in to Bicêtre to support the Prussians. Simultaneously, Von Kirchbach ordered the Prussian 10th Division to respond shortly after their vanguard force reached the northeast of Villacoublay. A combined attack by the Bavarians with the Prussians still fighting at the Bois de Garenne repelled the French at Pavé blanc. Meanwhile, the French had formed their artillery, and three regiments attacked Petit Bicêtre and Bois de Garenne. Firepower of Prussian muskets defeated the French, and German shells forced the Zouaves soldiers of the Trivaux farm to flee to Paris. Part of the right flank of the French army had to flee frantically. The Prussian-Bayern coalition captured Pavé blanc, recaptured Dame Rose and stormed into the Meudon forest.

However, the rest of the French forces were concentrated around a small earthen fortress erected on the Châtillon plateau. Thereafter, Von Kirchbach led V Corps back to Versailles, handing the battle over to Bavaria's II Corps. While a Bavarian brigade was sent to Sceaux, the 8th Brigade of the 4th Bavarian Army was sent to Croix de Bernis, and the 7th Brigade advanced to Bourg. The German army increased its artillery, and after a day of fighting, Ducrot ordered the destruction of the cannons at the earthen fortifications and retreated to the rear of separate fortresses. Some soldiers of the Bavarian 3rd Division followed him through Sceaux and Plessis-Picquet, and captured his abandoned fortifications. The battle demonstrated the power of the French artillery, but the German victory at the Battle of Châtillon created favorable conditions for the Bavarians to defeat all French attacks on the Chatillon Plateau. After this battle, the German army completed the Siege of Paris. The French army would conduct many more fierce breakout attempts, but they were all defeated by the Germans.

== Bibliography ==
- Theodor Fontane: Der Krieg gegen Frankreich 1870–1871. Gesamtausgabe in 3 Bänden, Verlag Rockstuhl, Bad Langensalza, Reprint 1873/1876/2004, ISBN 3-937135-25-1 (Band 1); ISBN 3-937135-26-X (Band 2) und ISBN 3-937135-27-8 (Band 3)
