= Battle of Buzenval =

Battle of Buzenval may refer to:

- Battle of Buzenval (1870), fought on 21 October, part of the defence of Paris during the Franco-Prussian War
- Battle of Buzenval (1871), fought on 19 January, part of the defence of Paris during the Franco-Prussian War
