= Carey de Bellemare =

French military officer (1824–1905)

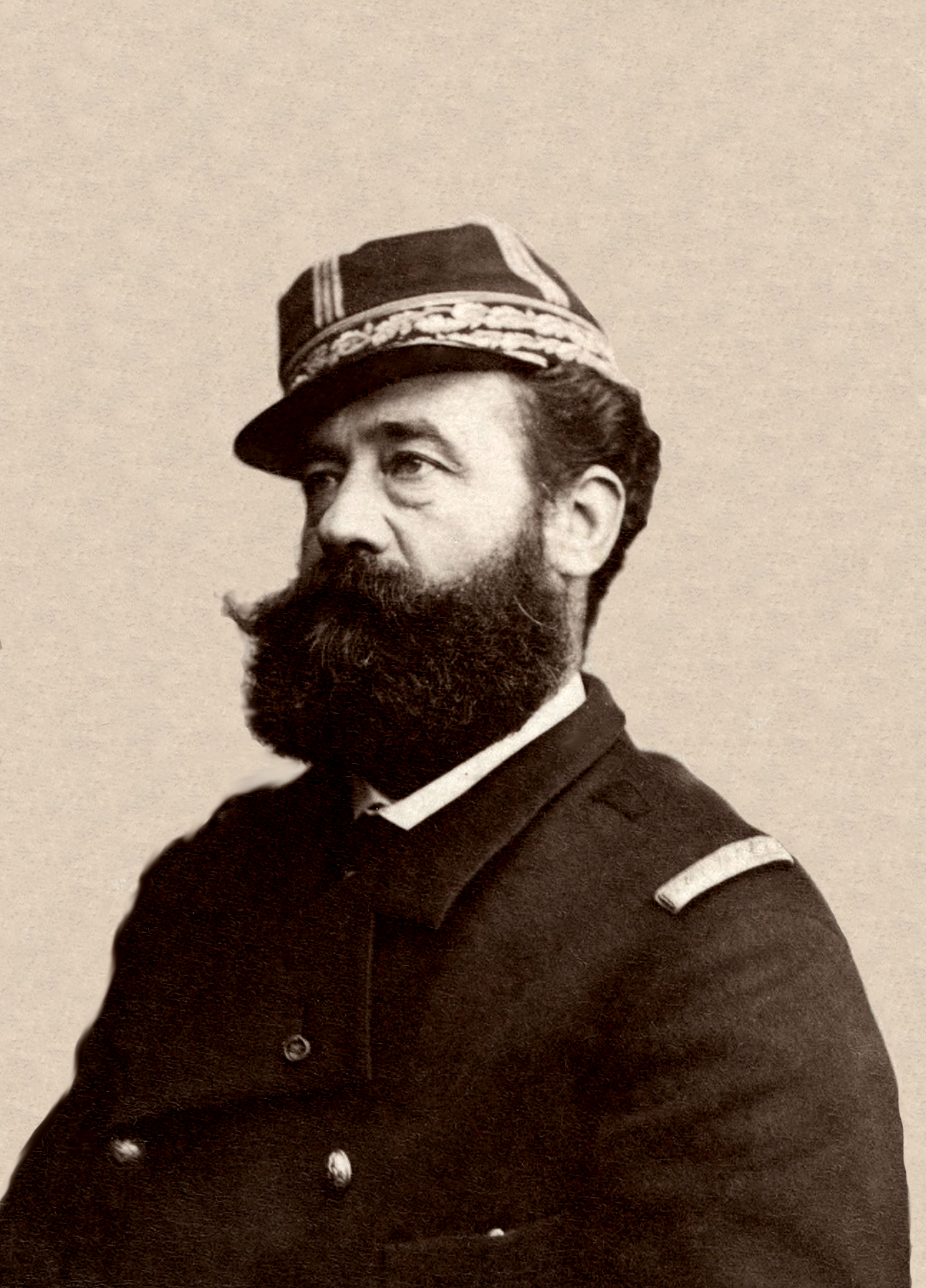
- Born: December 14, 1824; Paris, Kingdom of France
- Died: September 13, 1905 (aged 80); Nice, Alpes-Maritimes, French Republic
- Military career
- Allegiance: July Monarchy; French Second Republic; Second French Empire; French Third Republic
- Branch: French Army
- Service years: 1841–1889
- Rank: Major General
- Commands: 78th Infantry Regiment
- Conflicts: French conquest of Algeria; June Days uprising Åland War; Crimean War; Second Italian War of Independence; Second French Intervention in Mexico: Battle of Puebla; Franco-Prussian War: Battle of Wörth; Battle of Le Bourget; Battle of Villiers; Siege of Paris
- Awards: Legion of Honour

Adrien Alexandre Adolphe de Carrey de Bellemare (French pronunciation: [adʁijɛ̃ alɛksɑ̃dʁ adɔlf də kaʁɛ də bɛlmaʁ]), more commonly known as Carey de Bellemare, was a French Divisional General who was most notable for his service during the Franco-Prussian War.

== Biography ==
=== Early military career ===
Bellemare entered the École spéciale militaire de Saint-Cyr on April 16, 1841, who was made a sub-lieutenant on April 1, 1843, and then assigned to a Zouave regiment in the French conquest of Algeria. On June 19, 1845, during the fighting there with the nomadic tribe of the Ouled el-Act, he was shot and had to return home. On May 30, 1848, he was ordinance officer of General Lamoriciere and participated in June in the fight against the June Days uprising, where he was wounded again on June 23 while cracking down on the barricade of Faubourg Saint-Martin.On June 28, 1848, he was knighted in the Legion of Honor. After being promoted to lieutenant, he was assigned to the 48th Infantry Regiment on July 28, 1848. He was then promoted to captain on July 5, 1854, and took part in the Åland War and the Battle of Bomarsund from July 15 under General Baraguey d'Hilliers.

Transferred to the 74th Infantry Regiment on January 31, 1856, he took part in the Crimean War on February 29 and June 19. His appointment as battalion commander in the 81st Infantry Regiment took place on May 17, 1859. From April 27 he took part in the Italian campaign and led a battalion in the 98th Infantry Regiment, then the 3rd Regiment of the Guard Corps. On July 2, 1859, he returned to France and on May 12, he was appointed officer of the Legion of Honor. On July 28, 1862, he went to Mexico with the French expeditionary force. He participated in the Battle of Puebla and distinguished himself in the storming of Fort San Xavier. Back in France, he was promoted to lieutenant colonel on June 15, 1863, and assigned to the 95th Infantry Regiment on August 13. On August 21, he moved to the 17th regiment as commander and on October 7, 1863, to the 97th Infantry Regiment.

=== Franco-Prussian War ===
On August 10, 1868, he was promoted to colonel and, with the outbreak of the Franco-Prussian War, took command of the 78th Line Regiment that was used in the Battle of Wörth. On August 25, 1870, he was appointed brigadier general and took over the command of the 2nd Brigade of the 4th Division (1st Corps of the Chalons Army). During the Battle of Beaumont, after General Lartigue was wounded, he took command of the 4th Division and escaped while disguised as a farmer after the Battle of Sedan from captivity. He returned to Paris on September 8, after the fall of the French Empire, he took command of the northern fortification front in the Saint-Denis area. For the organization of Fort Briche he was commended by General Ducrot . On October 27 and 28, he led a brigade on the offensive in the Le Bourget area. On November 3, he led a new brigade in the 1st Division of III. Corps with which he led a sortie to the Marne on November 30 at the Battle of Villiers. also deals heavy damage to the enemy. On December 5, he took over the leadership of the 1st Division of the II. Corps and was promoted to Division General on December 8, 1870. On January 19, 1871, he led during the Battle of Buzenval in the middle column with 34,680 men in the battle of Mont Valérien, while General Vinoy attacked a column against Saint-Cloud and General Ducrot against Rueil-Malmaison. On February 16, 1871, he was relieved of command against his will and placed in reserve.

=== Postwar life ===
On August 22, 1873, he was briefly assigned to a brigade of the 14th Military Division in Périgueux and was dismissed on October 28 after publishing a letter in which he states that he refused to serve a monarchy. On June 16, 1874, he entered service again with the rank of brigadier general, on April 13, 1874, he was given command of the 55th Infantry Brigade. On May 14, 1875, he took over the 60th Brigade, on January 12, 1876, the 69th Brigade and on September 19, 1877, the 2nd Brigade. The fall of President Mac-Mahon and the rise of the Republicans to power accelerated his further career. On June 3, 1879, he was appointed commander of the 29th Infantry Division in Nice and was promoted to major general in 1879. On July 8, 1881, he became commander of the Legion of Honor. Between 1879 and 1882 he was Inspector General of the 29th Military Arrondissement. On February 27, 1883, he was commanding general of the XIII. Corps in Clermont-Ferrand, on February 15, 1885, he took over the V Corps in Orléans and on February 6, 1886, the IX. Corps in Tours. He was appointed a member of the War Council on February 6, 1886, and was appointed Grand Officer of the Legion of Honor on June 24. Because of a special mission abroad he had to take command of the IX on June 28, 1888. And retired on December 14, 1889. Bellemare died on September 13, 1905, in Nice.
