= Battle of Villiers =

1870 Franco-Prussian War battle

Coordinates: 48.8172°N 2.5156°E

- Part of Franco-Prussian War
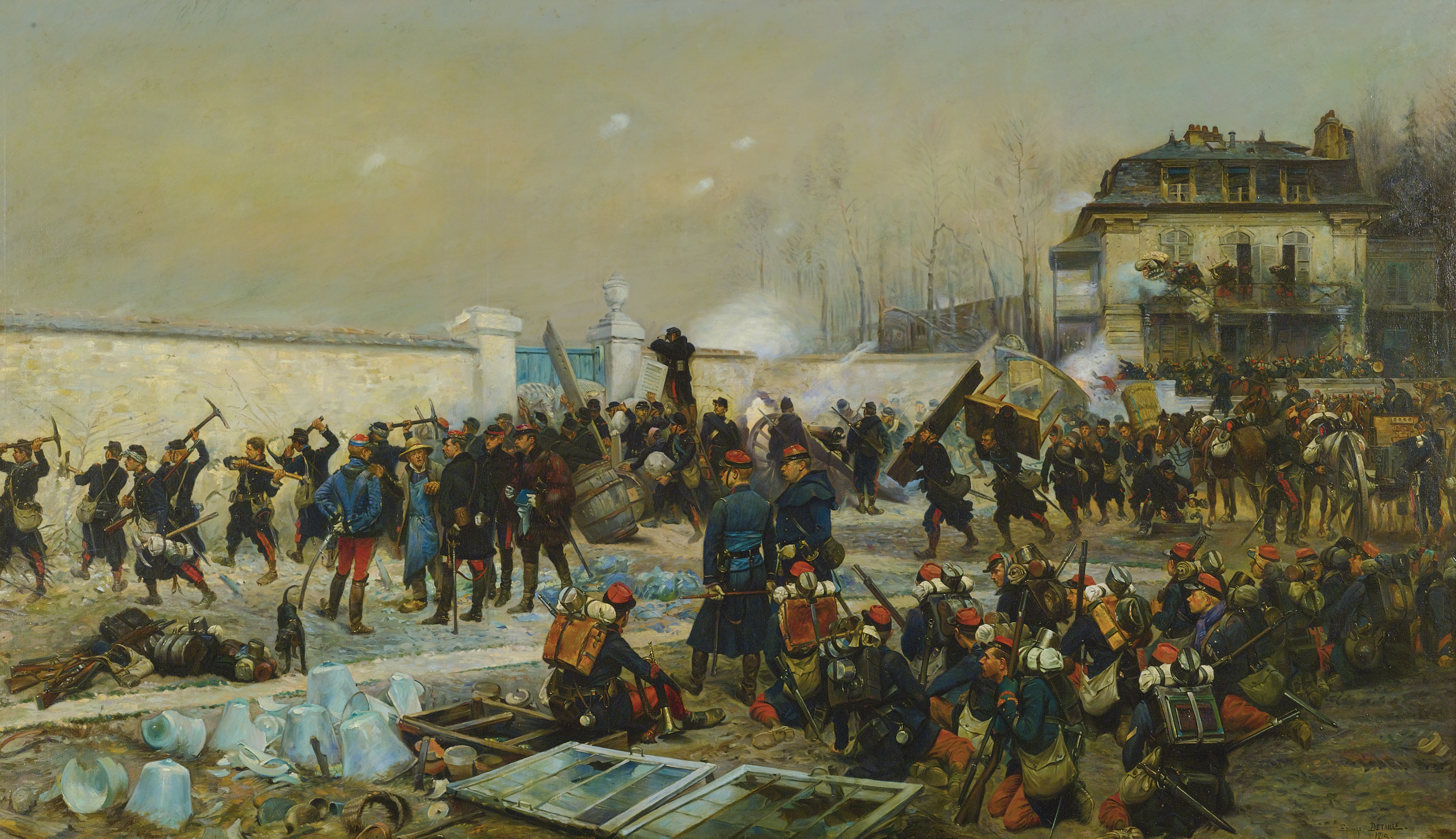
- The Battle of Champigny by Édouard Detaille
Date	29 November – 3 December 1870
Location	Champigny-sur-Marne, Bry-sur-Marne and Villiers-sur-Marne, France
Result	German victory

Belligerents
North German Confederation: Prussia; Saxony; Württemberg	French Empire

Commanders and leaders
Eduard von Fransecky; Albert of Saxony	Auguste-Alexandre Ducrot

Strength
28,000	52,000

Casualties and losses
3,500 killed or wounded	3,500 killed or wounded 1,500 captured

The Battle of Villiers, also called the Battle of Champigny, was the largest of the French sorties from besieged Paris during the Franco-Prussian War.

== Background ==
After news reached Paris of the French defeat at the battle of Le Bourget and the surrender of Metz, morale began to drop in the city. Attempting to counter the grim mood, General Louis Jules Trochu decided to attempt a breakout which could possibly link up with the French Army of the Loire.

== French attack ==
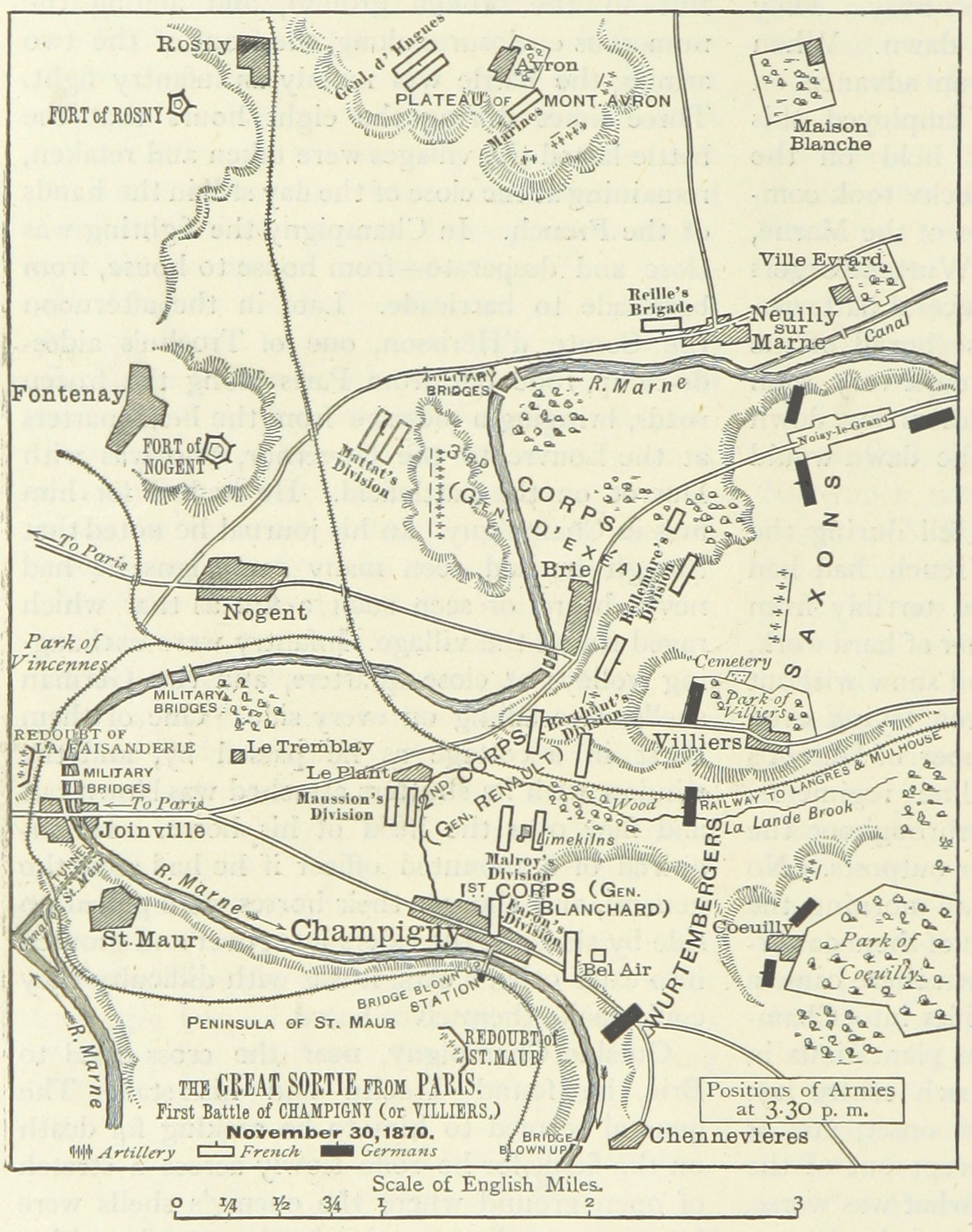
A map of the positions of the forces at 3:30 pm on 30 November

On 30 November Auguste-Alexandre Ducrot led 52,000 men towards the villages of Champigny and Bry on the east bank of the Marne River. This section of the German lines was held by the Württemberg Division of the Prussian 3rd Army. On the 29th the Marne had flooded and a French reconnaissance attack turned into a disaster; 1,300 troops were lost. The main attack was to come the next day followed by a series of diversionary attacks. French artillery drove German advance units from the villages of Bry and Champigny and allowed Ducrot's troops to cross the Marne on pontoon bridges. Ducrot established a bridgehead on the opposite bank of the river at the two villages and advanced up a plateau towards Villiers. The Württemberg Division was so well entrenched that the French artillery did little to dislodge them and the attack stalled. Ducrot called on his III Corps, which had crossed the Marne north of Brie, to assault Villiers from the north. The III Corps hesitated too long for an attack to be of any use and now Ducrot was fighting a defensive battle.

== German counterattack ==
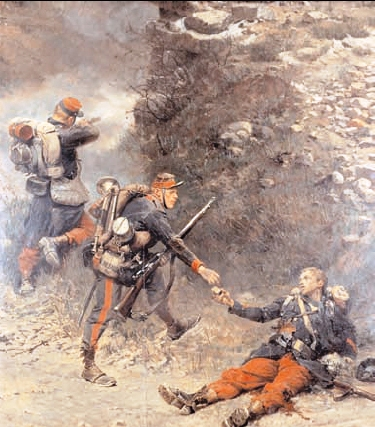
Le fond de la Giberne, 1882, by Alphonse de Neuville. A dying French infantryman gives his last cartridges to a clairon

Helmuth von Moltke, the Chief of Staff, was annoyed with the lack of energy which Albert of Saxony, commanding the Army of the Meuse, had shown in sending reinforcements to the Württemberg Division. Von Moltke ordered General Eduard von Fransecky to move with his II Corps to the threatened area and assume command of all operations there. Fransecky however, had not been notified in time to do anything about the fight on the 30th. The two armies called a truce and buried their dead on 1 December.

On 2 December the Germans faced a similar situation to the battle of Le Bourget. Fransecky did not feel that a counterattack was necessary since the main German line had not been broken yet; Albert pushed for a counterattack anyway, just as he had at Le Bourget. Fransecky's attack was so rapid that it quickly took Champigny. The French then rallied and a stalemate ensued for the rest of the day. The situation worried von Moltke enough to cause him to draw up plans in case the French renewed their attack the following day and succeeded in breaking through. However, Ducrot had no intention of renewing the fight. His troops had suffered greatly in the cold and even though he received word that the Army of the Loire was moving towards Paris, he withdrew back into Paris by 4 December.

== Aftermath ==
The fighting had been costly for both sides. The French had lost some 5,000 troops while the Germans lost 3,500. The Army of the Loire was defeated at the Battle of Orléans and Ducrot urged Trochu and Foreign Minister Jules Favre to sue for peace with Prussia.
