= Eduard von Fransecky =

German general

Eduard Friedrich Karl von Fransecky
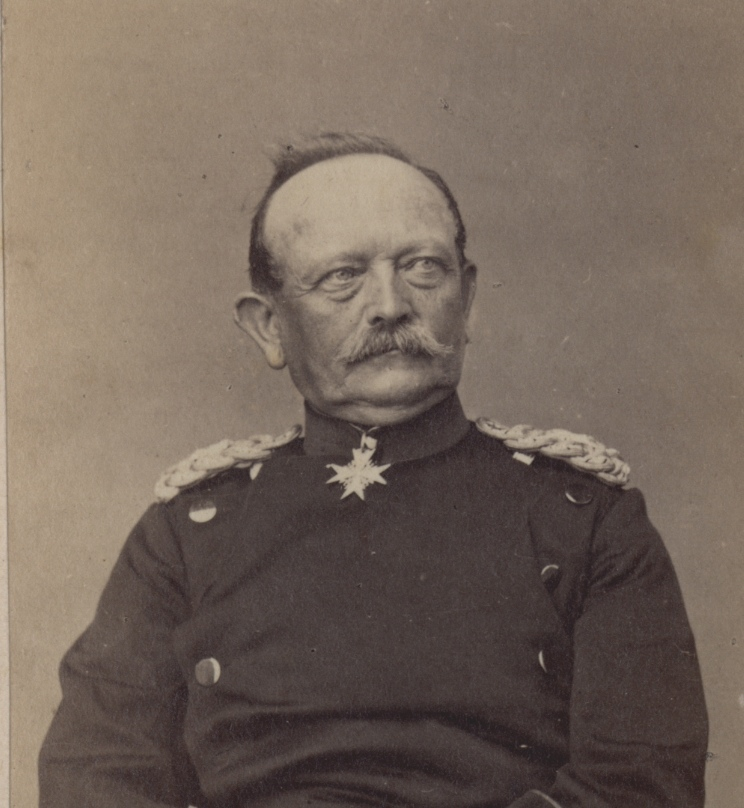
- Born: 16 November 1807; Gedern
- Died: 22 May 1890 (aged 82); Wiesbaden
- Military career
- Allegiance: Kingdom of Prussia; German Empire
- Branch: Prussian Army; Imperial German Army
- Service years: 1825–1882
- Rank: General of the Infantry
- Commands: 7th Division; II Army Corps; XIV Army Corps
- Conflicts: First Schleswig War; Austro-Prussian War; • Battle of Königgrätz; Franco-Prussian War; • Battle of Villiers
- Awards: Pour le Mérite with Oakleaves; Order of the Black Eagle; Order of the Red Eagle

Eduard Friedrich Karl von Fransecky (16 November 1807 – 22 May 1890) was a Prussian general who served in the Austro-Prussian War and the Franco-Prussian War.

== Biography ==
Fransecky was born in 1807 in Gedern in a military family. In 1818 he entered a Prussian cadetschool in Potsdam. In 1825 he was commissioned as an ensign in the 16th Infantry regiment stationed in Düsseldorf. Between 1843 and 1857 Fransecky served in the Historical division of the Prussian general staff. He fought in the war against Denmark in 1848, serving in Schleswig.

In 1860 von Fransecky was attached to Oldenburg where he commanded an Oldenburgian infantry regiment. In November 1864 he was promoted to major-general and later to lieutenant-general. He was given command of the 7th Division stationed in Magdeburg. In the Austro-Prussian War his division was part of Second Army. His division was able during Münchengrätz, and Königgrätz. During Königgrätz, his division was able to find Austrians by advancing to Swiep Forest, where his division met with Austrians. And for these battles, he was given the Pour le Mérite. Between 1867 and 1869 von Fransecky served as inspector of the Saxon army.

In 1870 von Fransecky became the commanding general of the Prussian 2nd Corps. During the Franco-Prussian War the Prussian 2nd Corps was part of the German 2nd army commanded by Prince Friedrich Karl. Fransecky distinguished himself at Gravelotte, where he reached the battlefield after a 16-hour forced march. After Gravelotte, 2nd Corps was part of the troops besieging Metz. After the fall of Metz Fransecky and 2nd Corps were sent to Paris. During the Siege of Paris Fransecky was given command of the troops between Seine and Marne. On 2 December 1870 Ducrot tried to break through the German ring at Villiers but the sortie was stopped by troops under Fransecky.

In January 1871 2nd Corps was detached from the siege and placed under command of Edwin von Manteuffel's newly formed Army of the South. Under Manteuffel's command Fransecky took part in the operations in the Côte-d'Or and Jura against Bourbaki's Armée de l'Est. After Bourbaki's forces were defeated at Pontarlier and forced over the Swiss border, Fransecky was given command of 14th Corps in Strassbourg and awarded the Oak Leaves to his Pour le Mérite on 5 February 1871.

After the war he was given a dotation of 150.000 thaler. In 1879 he was made governor of Berlin. He resigned as governor for health reasons in 1882. Eduard von Fransecky died in 1890 in Wiesbaden.

== Awards and decorations ==
- Pour le Mérite (military), 20 September 1866; with Oak Leaves, 5 February 1871
- Knight of the Black Eagle, 8 April 1875; with Collar, 18 January 1876; in Diamonds, 23 November 1882
- Knight of the Red Eagle, 4th Class with Swords, 1848; Grand Cross with Oak Leaves and Swords on Ring, 2 September 1873
- Grand Commander's Cross of the Royal House Order of Hohenzollern, with Star, 23 September 1879
- Grand Cross of the Military Merit Order, 30 December 1870 (Württemberg)
- Military Merit Order (Bavaria)
- Grand Cross of the Albert Order, with War Decoration and Crown, 1871 (Saxony)
- Knight of St. George, 4th Class, 27 December 1870 (Russia)
- Grand Cross of the House and Merit Order of Peter Frederick Louis, with Golden Crown and Swords, 5 April 1875 (Oldenburg)

== Literature ==
- Howard, Michael, The Franco-Prussian War: The German Invasion of France 1870–1871, New York: Routledge, 2001. ISBN 0-415-26671-8.
