= II Corps (German Empire) =

II Army Corps II. Armee-Korps
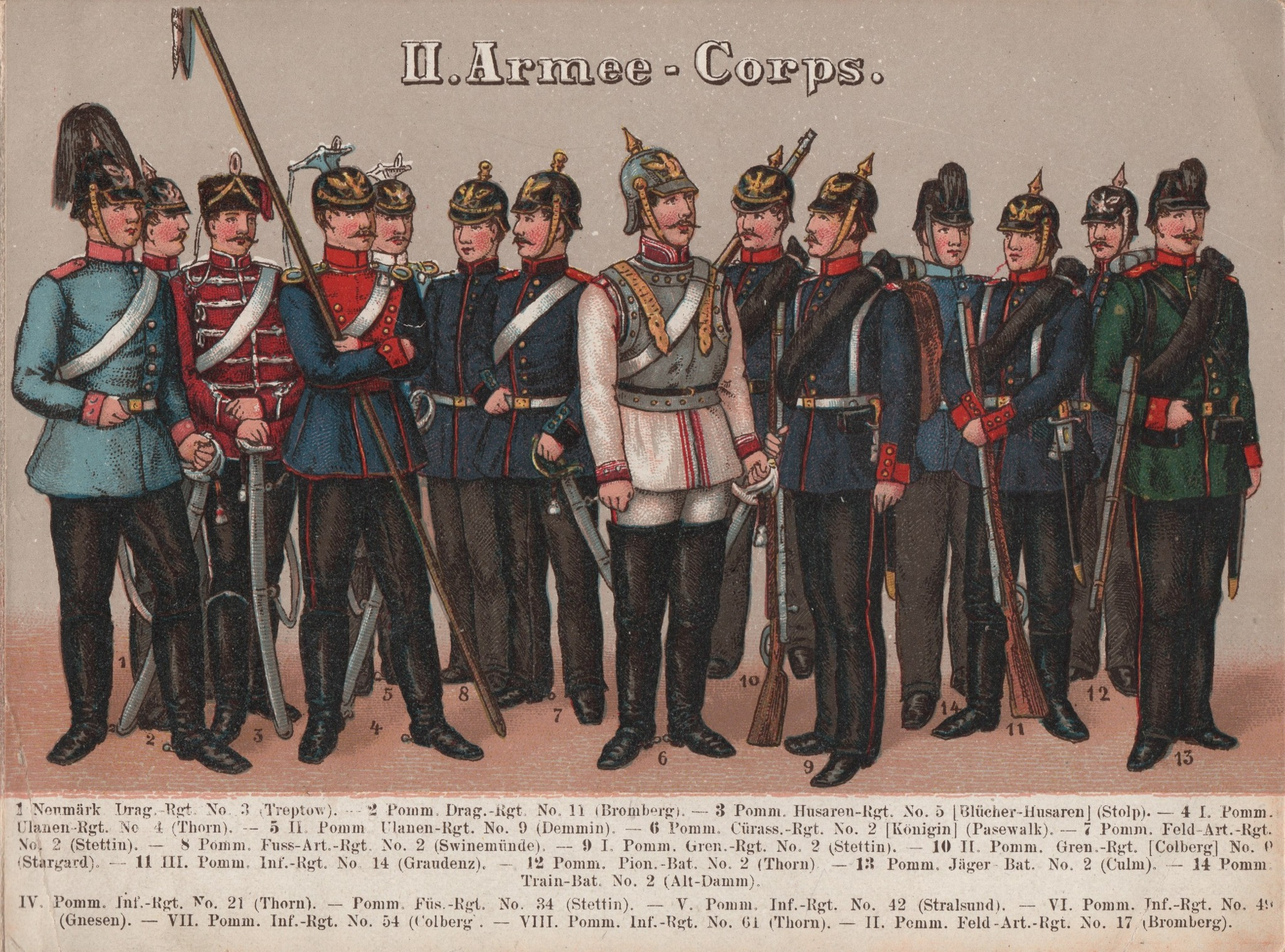
- Uniforms of the II Army Corps during La Belle Époque
- Active: 3 April 1820–10 January 1915
- Country: Prussia / German Empire
- Type: Corps
- Size: Approximately 44,000 (on mobilisation in 1914)
- Garrison/HQ: Stettin (now Szczecin, Poland)/ Königsplatz 2
- Shoulder strap piping: White
- Engagements: Austro-Prussian War Battle of Königgrätz Franco-Prussian War Battle of Gravelotte Battle of Villiers Siege of Metz Siege of Paris World War I Battle of the Frontiers Battle of Mons First Battle of the Marne Race to the Sea First Battle of Ypres

Insignia
- Abbreviation: II AK

The II Army Corps / II AK (German: II. Armee-Korps) was a corps level command of the Prussian and then th

e Imperial German Armies from the 19th Century to World War I.

It was established on 3 April 1820 with headquarters initially in Berlin. From 1837, the headquarters moved to Stettin (now Szczecin, Poland), back to Berlin in 1863, before finally settling in Stettin from 1870. The Corps catchment area included the Province of Pomerania, the district (Regierungsbezirk) of Bromberg from the Province of Posen and the Province of West Prussia. Later, the West Prussian districts were transferred to the new XVII Corps District.

In peacetime, the Corps was assigned to the VIII Army Inspectorate, which became the 1st Army at the start of the First World War. The Corps headquarters was upgraded to form the headquarters of the South Army on 10 January 1915.

The Corps was reformed post-war, before being finally disbanded in 1919.

== Austro-Prussian War ==
The II Corps formed part of Prince Friedrich Karl of Prussia's 1st Army and fought in the Austro-Prussian War against Austria in 1866, including the Battle of Königgrätz.

== Franco-Prussian War ==
The Corps fought in the Franco-Prussian War against France in 1870-71 as part of the 2nd Army. It saw action in the Battle of Gravelotte, Battle of Villiers (playing a key part), the Siege of Metz, and the Siege of Paris, among other actions.

== Peacetime organisation ==
The 25 peacetime Corps of the German Army (Guards, I - XXI, I - III Bavarian) had a reasonably standardised organisation. Each consisted of two divisions with usually two infantry brigades, one field artillery brigade and a cavalry brigade each. Each brigade normally consisted of two regiments of the appropriate type, so each Corps normally commanded 8 infantry, 4 field artillery and 4 cavalry regiments. There were exceptions to this rule:

V, VI, VII, IX and XIV Corps each had a 5th infantry brigade (so 10 infantry regiments)
II, XIII, XVIII and XXI Corps had a 9th infantry regiment
I, VI and XVI Corps had a 3rd cavalry brigade (so 6 cavalry regiments)
the Guards Corps had 11 infantry regiments (in 5 brigades) and 8 cavalry regiments (in 4 brigades).

Each Corps also directly controlled a number of other units. This could include one or more

Foot Artillery Regiment
Jäger Battalion
Pioneer Battalion
Train Battalion

Peacetime organization of the Corps
Corps	Division	Brigade	Units	Garrison
II Corps	3rd Division	5th Infantry Brigade	2nd (1st Pomeranian) Grenadiers "King Frederick William IV"	Stettin
II Corps	3rd Division	5th Infantry Brigade	9th (2nd Pomeranian) Colberg Grenadiers "Count Gneisenau"	Stargard in Pommern
II Corps	3rd Division	5th Infantry Brigade	54th (7th Pomeranian) Infantry "von der Goltz"	Kolberg, III Bn at Köslin
II Corps	3rd Division	6th Infantry Brigade	34th (Pomeranian) Fusiliers "Queen Victoria of Sweden"	Stettin, II Bn at Swinemünde
II Corps	3rd Division	6th Infantry Brigade	42nd (5th Pomeranian) Infantry "Prince Maurice of Anhalt-Dessau"	Stralsund, III Bn at Greifswald
II Corps	3rd Division	3rd Field Artillery Brigade	2nd (1st Pomeranian) Field Artillery	Kolberg, Belgard
II Corps	3rd Division	3rd Field Artillery Brigade	38th (Vorpommersches) Field Artillery	Stettin
II Corps	3rd Division	3rd Cavalry Brigade	2nd (Pomeranian) Cuirassiers “Queen”	Pasewalk
II Corps	3rd Division	3rd Cavalry Brigade	9th (2nd Pomeranian) Uhlans	Demmin
II Corps	4th Division	7th Infantry Brigade	14th (3rd Pomeranian) Infantry "Count Schwerin"	Bromberg
II Corps	4th Division	7th Infantry Brigade	149th (6th West Prussian) Infantry	Schneidemühl, III Bn at Deutsch-Krone
II Corps	4th Division	8th Infantry Brigade	49th (6th Pomeranian) Infantry	Gnesen
II Corps	4th Division	8th Infantry Brigade	140th (4th West Prussian) Infantry	Hohensalza
II Corps	4th Division	4th Field Artillery Brigade	17th (2nd Pomeranian) Field Artillery	Bromberg
II Corps	4th Division	4th Field Artillery Brigade	53rd (Hinterpommersches) Field Artillery	Bromberg, Hohensalza
II Corps	4th Division	4th Cavalry Brigade	3rd (Neumark) Mounted Grenadiers "Baron Derfflinger"	Bromberg
II Corps	4th Division	4th Cavalry Brigade	12th (2nd Brandenburg) Dragoons "von Arnim"	Gnesen
II Corps	Corps Troops		2nd (1st Pomeranian) Foot Artillery "von Hindersin"	Swinemünde, Emden
II Corps	Corps Troops		15th (2nd Pomeranian) Foot Artillery	Bromberg, Graudenz
II Corps	Corps Troops		2nd (Pomeranian) Pioneer Battalion	Stettin
II Corps	Corps Troops		2nd (Pomeranian) Train Battalion	Altdamm

== World War I ==
=== Organisation on mobilisation ===
On mobilization on 2 August 1914, the Corps was restructured. The 3rd Cavalry Brigade was withdrawn to form part of the 4th Cavalry Division and the 4th Cavalry Brigade was broken up and its regiments assigned to the divisions as reconnaissance units. The divisions received engineer companies and other support units from the Corps headquarters. In summary, II Corps mobilised with 24 infantry battalions, 8 machine gun companies (48 machine guns), 8 cavalry squadrons, 24 field artillery batteries (144 guns), 4 heavy artillery batteries (16 guns), 3 pioneer companies and an aviation detachment.

Initial wartime organization of the Corps
Corps	Division	Brigade	Units
II Corps	3rd Division	5th Infantry Brigade	2nd Grenadier Regiment
II Corps	3rd Division	5th Infantry Brigade	9th Grenadier Regiment
II Corps	3rd Division	6th Infantry Brigade	34th Fusilier Regiment
II Corps	3rd Division	6th Infantry Brigade	42nd Infantry Regiment
II Corps	3rd Division	3rd Field Artillery Brigade	2nd Field Artillery Regiment
II Corps	3rd Division	3rd Field Artillery Brigade	38th Field Artillery Regiment
II Corps	3rd Division		3rd Horse Grenadier Regiment
II Corps	3rd Division		1st Company, 2nd Pioneer Battalion
II Corps	3rd Division		3rd Divisional Pontoon Train
II Corps	3rd Division		1st Medical Company
II Corps	3rd Division		3rd Medical Company
II Corps	4th Division	7th Infantry Brigade	14th Infantry Regiment
II Corps	4th Division	7th Infantry Brigade	149th Infantry Regiment
II Corps	4th Division	8th Infantry Brigade	49th Infantry Regiment
II Corps	4th Division	8th Infantry Brigade	140th Infantry Regiment
II Corps	4th Division	6th Field Artillery Brigade	17th Field Artillery Regiment
II Corps	4th Division	6th Field Artillery Brigade	53rd Field Artillery Regiment
II Corps	4th Division		12th Dragoon Regiment
II Corps	4th Division		2nd Company, 2nd Pioneer Battalion
II Corps	4th Division		3rd Company, 2nd Pioneer Battalion
II Corps	4th Division		4th Divisional Pontoon Train
II Corps	4th Division		2nd Medical Company
II Corps	Corps Troops		I Battalion, 15th Foot Artillery Regiment
II Corps	Corps Troops		30th Aviation Detachment
II Corps	Corps Troops		2nd Corps Pontoon Train
II Corps	Corps Troops		2nd Telephone Detachment
II Corps	Corps Troops		2nd Pioneer Searchlight Section
II Corps	Corps Troops	Munition Columns and Train	I & II Munition Column Sections (4th Inf. & 9th Art. Munition Columns)
II Corps	Corps Troops	Munition Columns and Train	I/15th Foot Artillery Munition Section (with 8 Columns)
II Corps	Corps Troops	Munition Columns and Train	I & II Train Section (12 Field Hospitals, 6 Supply Columns, 7 Supply Parks, 2 Horse Depts.)
II Corps	Corps Troops	Munition Columns and Train	2 Field Bakery Columns

=== Combat chronicle ===
On mobilisation, II Corps was assigned to the 1st Army, which was on the right wing of the forces for the Schlieffen Plan offensive in August 1914 on the Western Front. It saw action in the invasion of Belgium (Battle of Mons), the First Battle of the Marne, and the Race to the Sea (culminating in the First Battle of Ypres as part of the 6th Army). Thereafter, the Corps was transferred to the Eastern Front, joining the 9th Army. The Corps headquarters was upgraded to form the headquarters of the South Army on 10 January 1915.

== Commanders ==
The II Corps had the following commanders during its existence:

From	Rank	Name
1813	General der Infanterie	Friedrich Graf Kleist von Nollendorf
20 March 1820	General der Infanterie	Crown Prince Frederick William of Prussia
30 March 1838	Generalleutnant	Karl Heinrich von Block
30 March 1839	General der Kavallerie	Karl Friedrich Emil zu Dohna-Schlobitten
7 April 1842	Generalleutnant	Friedrich Graf von Wrangel
3 November 1849	General der Infanterie	Friedrich Wilhelm von Grabow
7 May 1857	General der Infanterie	Johann Georg von Wussow
29 January 1863	General der Infanterie	Karl Friedrich von Steinmetz
18 May 1864	General der Infanterie	Crown Prince Frederick William of Prussia
17 May 1866	Generalleutnant	Stephan von Schmidt
17 September 1866	General der Infanterie	Crown Prince Frederick William of Prussia
18 July 1870	General der Infanterie	Eduard von Fransecky
20 March 1871	General der Kavallerie	Otto Hann von Weyhern
14 June 1881	General der Infanterie	Ferdinand von Dannenberg
15 January 1887	General der Infanterie	Ernst von der Burg
28 October 1891	General der Infanterie	Hermann von Blomberg
27 January 1898	General der Kavallerie	Arnold von Langenbeck
21 September 1906	General der Infanterie	Josias von Heeringen
1 September 1909 – 10 January 1915	General der Infanterie	Alexander von Linsingen
17 December 1918	Generalleutnant	Richard von Kraewel
23 June 1919	Generalleutnant	Ernst von Oven

== See also ==
- Franco-Prussian War order of battle
- German Army order of battle (1914)
- List of Imperial German infantry regiments
- List of Imperial German artillery regiments
- List of Imperial German cavalry regiments
- Order of battle at Mons
- Order of battle of the First Battle of the Marne
- Order of First Battle of Ypres

== Bibliography ==
- Cron, Hermann (2002). Imperial German Army 1914-18: Organisation, Structure, Orders-of-Battle [first published: 1937]. Helion & Co. ISBN 1-874622-70-1.
- Ellis, John; Cox, Michael (1993). The World War I Databook. Aurum Press Ltd. ISBN 1-85410-766-6.
- Haythornthwaite, Philip J. (1996). The World War One Source Book. Arms and Armour. ISBN 1-85409-351-7.
- Wegner, Günter (1993). Stellenbesetzung der deutschen Heere 1815-1939, Bd. 1. Biblio Verlag, Osnabrück.
- Histories of Two Hundred and Fifty-One Divisions of the German Army which Participated in the War (1914–1918), compiled from records of Intelligence section of the General Staff, American Expeditionary Forces, at General Headquarters, Chaumont, France 1919. The London Stamp Exchange Ltd. 1989 [1920]. ISBN 0-948130-87-3.
- The German Forces in the Field; 7th Revision, 11th November 1918; Compiled by the General Staff, War Office. Imperial War Museum, London and the Battery Press. 1995 [1918]. ISBN 978-1-870423-95-3.
