= The Dream (Detaille) =

Painting by Édouard Detaille

- Le Rêve (French)
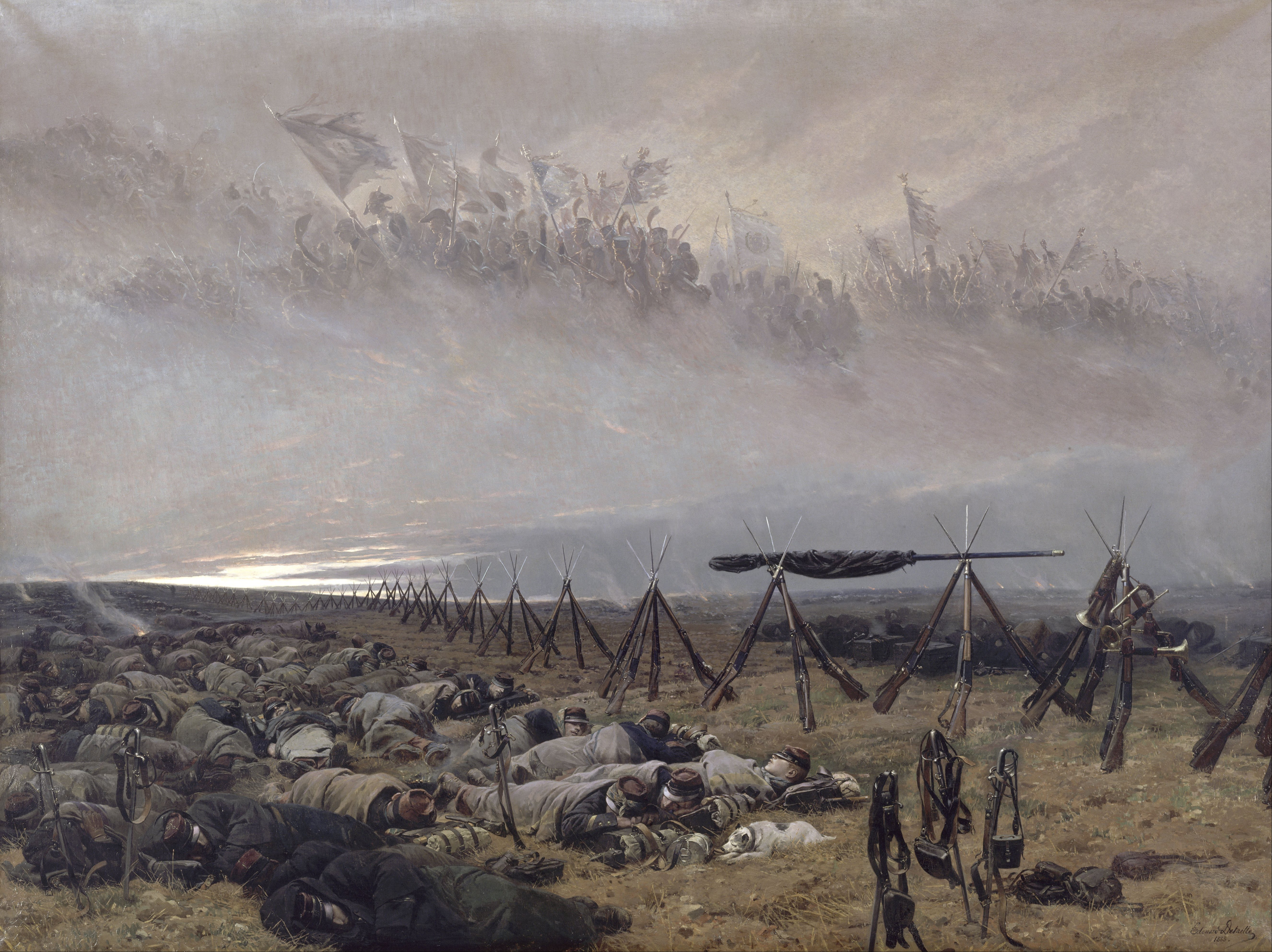
- Artist: Édouard Detaille
- Year: 1888
- Medium: Oil on canvas
- Movement: Academic Art
- Dimensions: 400 cm × 300 cm (160 in × 120 in)
- Location: Musée d'Orsay, Paris

The Dream is a painting by Édouard Detaille created in 1888. It won the gold medal at the Salon in 1888.

== Description ==
The Dream focuses on Detaille's specialty, the military. The painting depicts a very large encampment of French Army soldiers, almost stretching toward the horizon, who are asleep with their rifles stored before them in pyramid formations. The soldiers are young conscripts of the French Third Republic who are taking part in summer exercises, probably in Champagne. They are dreaming of the glory of their predecessors, and of exacting revenge following their country's defeat in the Franco-Prussian War.

In a patriotic allegory, French soldiers from previous battles are depicted in the sky above in an intentionally indistinct way. They include soldiers from the French Revolutionary Army, as well as those involved in the battles of Austerlitz, Trocadero, Magenta and Solferino, the invasion of Algiers and the defeats at Gravelotte and Reichshoffen in 1870.

This type of painting corresponds well with the sentiment of the time, evoking nostalgia for a unified, victorious France, and acting as a memento of a mythical France that was edging further into the past. For Detaille, creating this painting was to "take a direct political position", showing his support for nationalist general Georges Boulanger, as well as celebrating the army.
