= 4th Division (German Empire) =

4th Division (4. Division); in 1870-71 and from August 2, 1914, 4th Infantry Division (4. Infanterie-Division)
- Active: 1818–1919
- Country: Prussia/Germany
- Branch: Army
- Type: Infantry (in peacetime included cavalry)
- Size: Approx. 15,000
- Part of: II. Army Corps (II. Armeekorps)
- Garrison/HQ: Torgau (1818–1820), Stargard (1820–1852), Bromberg (1852–1918)
- Engagements: Austro-Prussian War: Königgrätz Franco-Prussian War: Gravelotte, Metz, Paris World War I: 1st Marne, Race to the Sea, Lemberg (1915), Verdun, German spring offensive, Lys

The 4th Division (4. Division) was a unit of the Prussian/German Army. It was formed in Torgau on September 5, 1818. The headquarters moved to Stargard (now Stargard Szczeciński, Poland) in 1820, where it stayed until 1852. In 1852, the headquarters moved to its final destination, Bromberg (now Bydgoszcz, Poland). From the corps' formation in 1820, the division was subordinated in peacetime to the II Army Corps (II. Armeekorps). The 4th Division was disbanded in 1919 during the demobilization of the German Army after World War I.

The 4th Division and its regiments fought in the Austro-Prussian War against Austria in 1866, including the Battle of Königgrätz. The division then fought in the Franco-Prussian War against France in 1870-71. It saw action in the Battle of Gravelotte, the siege of Metz, and the siege of Paris, among other actions.

In World War I, the 4th Division served initially on the Western Front, seeing action in the invasion of Belgium, the First Battle of the Marne and the Race to the Sea. The division was then transferred to the Eastern Front, where it fought in several campaigns, including the recapture of Lemberg in 1915. It then returned to the Western Front, where it saw action in the Battle of Verdun. After Verdun, it occupied various positions on the line on the Western Front. In 1918, it took part in the German spring offensive, including the Battle of Picardy and the Battle of the Lys (also known as the Lys Offensive or the Fourth Battle of Ypres).

== 1870 organization ==
During wartime, the 4th Division, like other regular German divisions, was redesignated an infantry division. The organization of the 4th Infantry Division in 1870 at the beginning of the Franco-Prussian War was as follows:

- 7. Infanterie-Brigade:
  - Colbergsches-Grenadier-Regiment (2. Pommersches) Nr. 9
  - 6. Pommersches Infanterie-Regiment Nr. 49
- 8. Infanterie-Brigade:
  - 4. Pommersches Infanterie-Regiment Nr. 21
  - 8. Pommersches Infanterie-Regiment Nr. 61
- Dragoner-Regiment von Wedel (Pommersches) Nr. 11

== Pre–World War I organization ==
Many regiments were renamed and assigned to different divisions during the period from 1871 to 1914. Among other changes, the 3rd and 4th Divisions swapped the Colberg Grenadiers and the 14th Infantry Regiment, and the regiments of the 8th Infantry Brigade joined the newly formed 35. Division in 1890. In 1914, the peacetime organization of the 4th Division was as follows:

- 7. Infanterie-Brigade:
  - Infanterie-Regiment Graf Schwerin (3. Pommersches) Nr. 14
  - 6. Westpreußisches Infanterie-Regiment Nr. 149
- 8. Infanterie-Brigade:
  - 6. Pommersches Infanterie-Regiment Nr. 49
  - 4. Westpreußisches Infanterie-Regiment Nr. 140
- 4. Kavallerie-Brigade:
  - Grenadier-Regiment zu Pferde Freiherr von Derfflinger (Neumärkisches) Nr. 3
  - Dragoner-Regiment von Arnim (2. Brandenburgisches) Nr. 12
- 4. Feldartillerie-Brigade:
  - 2. Pommersches Feldartillerie-Regiment Nr. 17
  - Hinterpommersches Feldartillerie-Regiment Nr. 53

== August 1914 organization ==
On mobilization in August 1914 at the beginning of World War I, most divisional cavalry, including brigade headquarters, was withdrawn to form cavalry divisions or split up among divisions as reconnaissance units. Divisions received engineer companies and other support units from their higher headquarters. The 4th Division was again renamed the 4th Infantry Division. The 4th Infantry Division's initial wartime organization was as follows:

- 7. Infanterie-Brigade:
  - Infanterie-Regiment Graf Schwerin (3. Pommersches) Nr. 14
  - 6. Westpreußisches Infanterie-Regiment Nr. 149
- 8. Infanterie-Brigade:
  - 6. Pommersches Infanterie-Regiment Nr. 49
  - 4. Westpreußisches Infanterie-Regiment Nr. 140
- Dragoner-Regiment von Arnim (2. Brandenburgisches) Nr. 12
- 4. Feldartillerie-Brigade:
  - 2. Pommersches Feldartillerie-Regiment Nr. 17
  - Hinterpommersches Feldartillerie-Regiment Nr. 53
- 2. Pommersches Pionier-Bataillon Nr. 2
- 3. Pommersches Pionier-Bataillon Nr. 2

== Late World War I organization ==
Divisions underwent many changes during the war, with regiments moving from division to division, and some being destroyed and rebuilt. During the war, most divisions became triangular: one infantry brigade with three infantry regiments rather than two infantry brigades of two regiments (a "square division"). An artillery commander replaced the artillery brigade headquarters, the cavalry was further reduced, the engineer contingent was increased, and a divisional signals command was created. The 4th Infantry Division's order of battle on January 26, 1918, was as follows:

- 8. Infanterie-Brigade:
  - Infanterie-Regiment Graf Schwerin (3. Pommersches) Nr. 14
  - 6. Pommersches Infanterie-Regiment Nr. 49
  - 4. Westpreußisches Infanterie-Regiment Nr. 140
  - MG-Scharfschützen-Abteilung Nr. 9
- 2.Eskadron/Grenadier-Regiment zu Pferde Freiherr von Derfflinger (Neumärkisches) Nr. 3
- Artillerie-Kommandeur 4:
  - Hinterpommersches Feldartillerie-Regiment Nr. 53
  - Fußartillerie-Bataillon Nr. 48
- Stab Pionier-Bataillon Nr. 114:
  - 2./Pommersches Pionier-Bataillon Nr. 2
  - 5./Pommersches Pionier-Bataillon Nr. 2
  - Minenwerfer-Kompanie Nr. 4
- Divisions-Nachrichten-Kommandeur 4
