= The Defense of Champigny =

Painting by Édouard Detaille

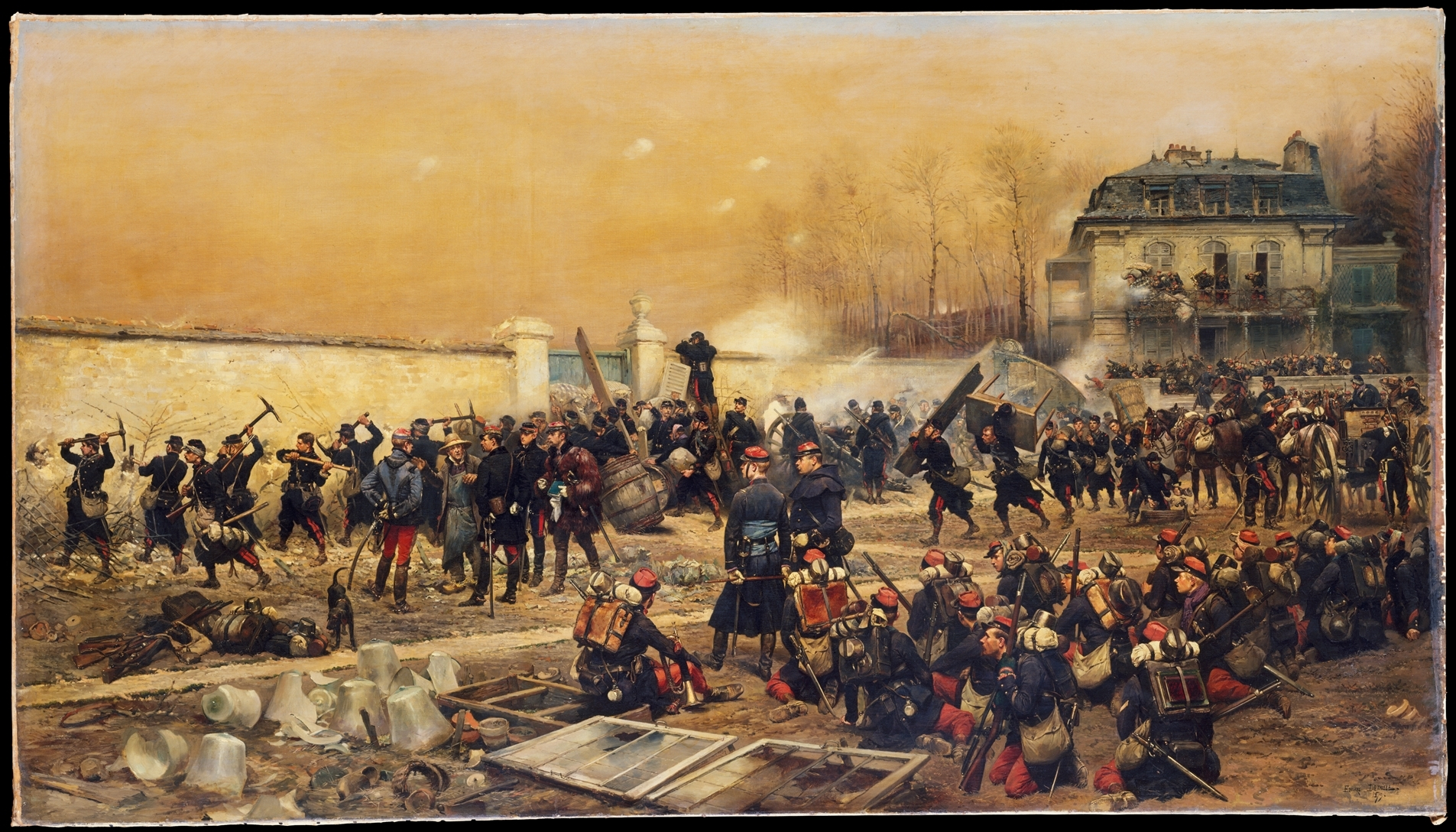
- Artist: Édouard Detaille
- Year: 1879
- Medium: Oil on canvas
- Dimensions: 121.9 cm × 215.3 cm (48.0 in × 84.8 in)
- Location: Metropolitan Museum of Art; New York

The Defense of Champigny is a late-19th-century painting by Édouard Detaille. The painting, done in oil on canvas, depicts the Battle of Villiers during the Franco-Prussian War. The painting is in the collection of the Metropolitan Museum of Art.

== History ==
The Defense of Champigny depicts a scene from the Battle of Villiers (also referred to as the Battle of Champingny) during the Franco-Prussian War of 1870–1871. The battle was fought as part of a series of attempts by the French Army to disrupt the Prussian Army's siege of Paris. At Villiers, what the French intended to be a small reconnaissance sortie turned into a pitched battle with the Prussians; this fighting in turn caused thousands of casualties on both sides, the partial destruction of the villages of Villiers-sur-Marne and Champigny-sur-Marne, and the retreat of the French army to Paris.

The Franco-Prussian War, which caused the collapse of the Second French Empire, was a military and political disaster for France. In the post-war period, the idea that France should rise to meet the challenge posed by the German Empire gained traction in French society. This desire for vengeance – revanchism – was reflected in the art of several prominent French painters, including that of Detaille. Such art commonly depicted the seemingly dilapidated state of the French army during the Franco-Prussian War, with the intent being to show that a revitalized national army was needed to project French power.

Detaille, who came from a military family, served in the French army during the Siege of Paris.

=== On display ===
Detaille originally painted his scene of the battle as part of a wider project to produce a panoramic painting of the battle. His preliminary painting from 1879, titled The Defense of Champigny, is in the collection of the Metropolitan Museum of Art in New York City. Detaille successfully completed a massive 52 × 400 ft panorama (titled the Battle of Champigny) in 1882, but over the years said work was divided into multiple smaller paintings. The fragment of the panorama that mirrors The Defense of Champigny was auctioned off to a private buyer in 2012.

== Description ==
The painting projects a scene in which French soldiers are fortifying a position in the village of Villiers-sur-Marne in preparation for the Prussian counterattack that historically took place. Men are seen using pickaxes to bore through a wall to allow the French artillery to fire on the Prussians. Other soldiers are occupied with building barricades out of furniture, and in the background more soldiers are seen emptying a house (presumably a maison de maître) of its furnishings for use as barricading materiel. The painting uses muted colors to accentuate the bleakness of the French situation; the ground is a trodden, muddy brown covered with debris, and the sky is dull sunset yellow in reference to the imminent fall of Paris and the Second Empire. In the top center of the painting, shells can be seen exploding against the sky and birds can be seen in flight. A forest of barren trees can also be seen in the background; some are bare due to the battle's being fought in early December, while one tree has been snapped in two by a shell.

As far as the French soldiers themselves are concerned, the men are depicted as being haggard but active; some soldiers are seen to be wounded, while many others carry their rifles slung over their shoulders in defiance of traditional military discipline. However, all are active; even the men seen idling in the painting's foreground are depicted as awaiting their officer's command. General Faron of the French Ist Corp and a cadre of officers can be seen in discussion with a gardener immediately to the left of the painting's center. A sense of unease emanates from the painting, as the men (and the viewer) wait for the inevitable Prussian attack. Whether they are officers or enlisted men, the French soldiers are portrayed in such a way as to be visually realistic while at the same time being portrayed in romanticized situations. This is in keeping with Detaille's inclusion in the school of academic art, which borrowed heavily from Romanticism. The painting is also an example of Detaille's penchant for military art.
