= Siegfried Karfunkelstein =

Recipient of the Iron Cross

Siegfried Karfunkelstein (21 February 1848 – 30 October 1870) was a German Jewish soldier. He joined the army in 1866 and fought during the Austro-Prussian War, and was later killed in action during Franco-Prussian War in October 1870 during the Battle of Le Bourget. He had been awarded the Iron Cross, second class, for his military services, two days prior to his death.

== Biography ==
Karfunkelstein was born at Beuthen, Silesia on 21 February 1848. At the age of 18, in 1866 he volunteered for military service and fought during the Austro-Prussian War.

In the Franco-Prussian War, Karfunkelstein distinguished himself so conspicuously that on 28 October 1870, he was decorated with the Iron Cross, second class. Two days later he was mortally wounded during field of battle at Le Bourget on 30 October when he stormed the first barricade, while rescuing the regimental flag from the hands of the enemy. He was, however, able to hand it to General Budrisky. According to some accounts, Karfunkelstein had jumped out to grab the flag and was shot through the chest, the bullet grazing the iron cross that he was wearing around his neck. Die deutschen Juden describes this as a "heroic act", citing him alongside the likes of Corporal Rosenthal and Henry Harburg as German war heroes of the battle.
