= Battle of Buzenval (1870) =

1870 battle during the Franco-Prussian War

- Part of the Siege of Paris (1870–1871) and the Franco-Prussian War
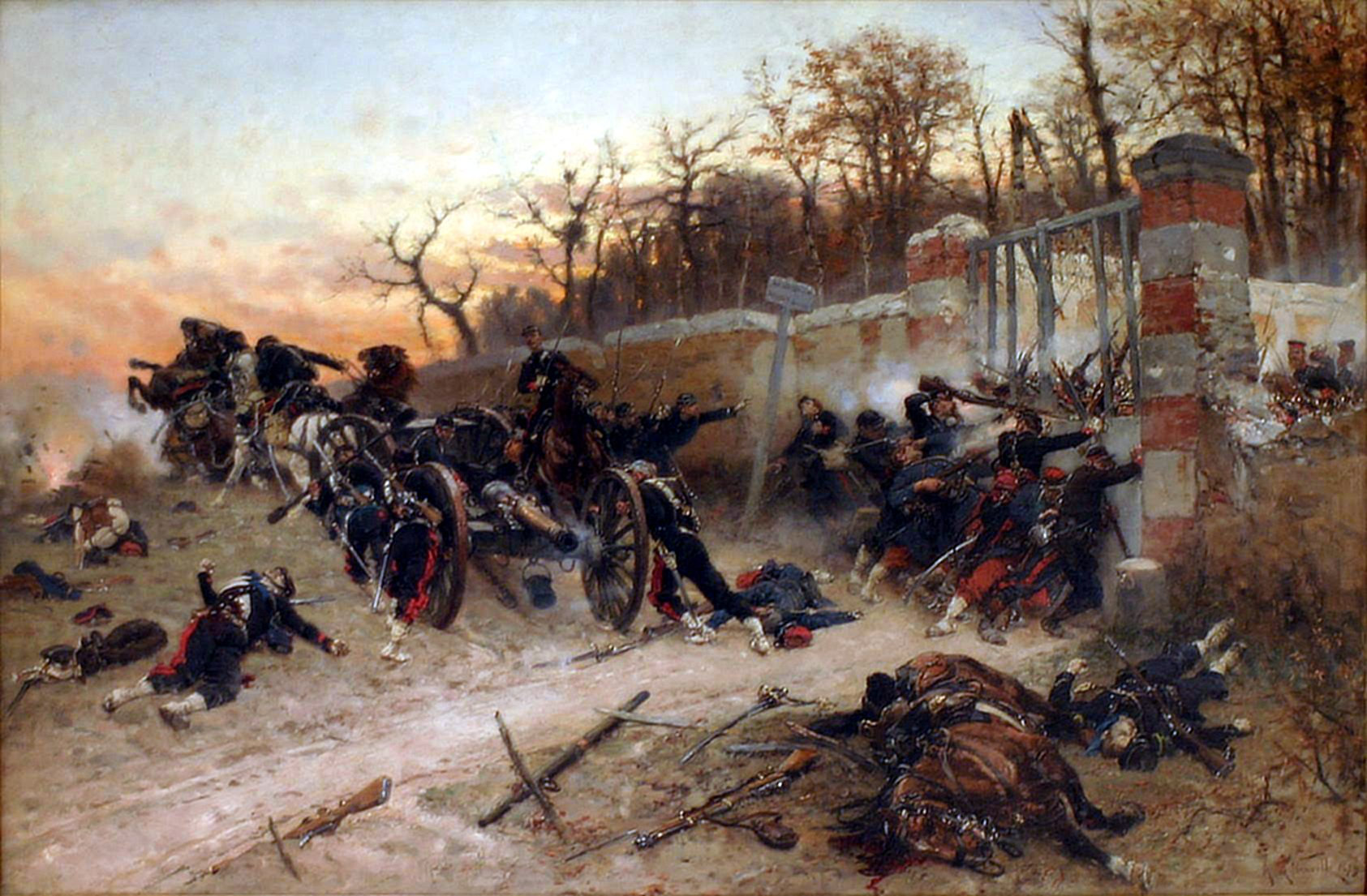
- Defence of the Longboyau Gate, château of Buzenval, 21 October 1870, by Alphonse de Neuville
Date	21 October 1870
Location	Rueil-Malmaison, France 48°53′50″N 2°11′30″E
Result	German victory

Belligerents
North German Confederation; Prussia	French Republic

Commanders and leaders
Hugo von Kirchbach	Auguste Ducrot; General Berthaut; General Martenot; General Noël; Colonel Cholletou

Units involved
Elements of V Corps, IV Corps and Guard Corps detachments	Elements of 14th Army Corps

Strength
Unknown	6,000 infantry 1 cavalry squadron 30 guns Reserves: 4,600 infantry, 2 squadrons and 46 guns

Casualties and losses
c. 400 men incapacitated	443 total 32 killed (2 officers); 409 wounded or missing (26 officers)
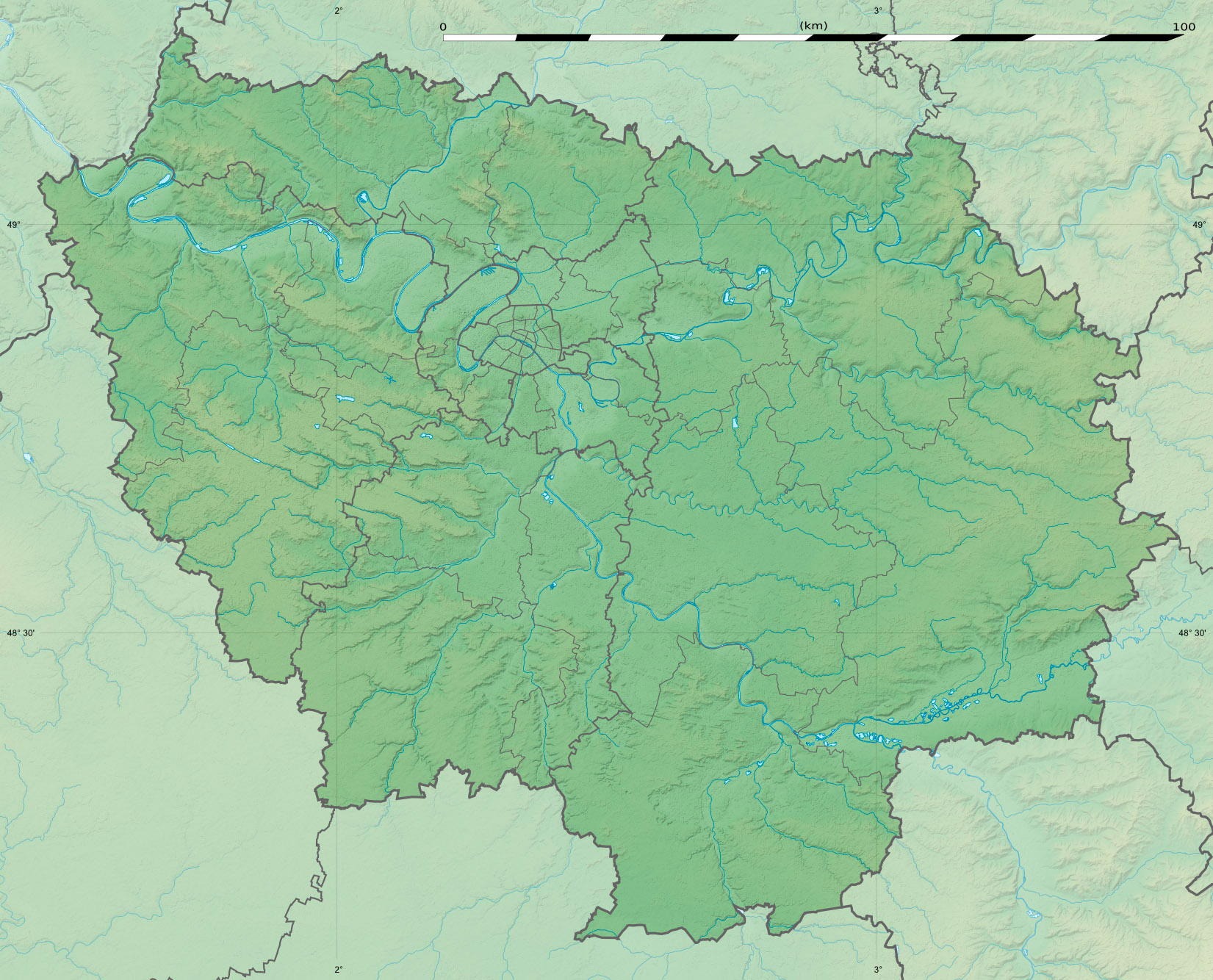
- Location of the battle in the present-day Ile-de-France region, of France

The (First) Battle of Buzenval took place on 21 October 1870 during the siege of Paris in the Franco-Prussian War. Following the collapse of the French field armies and the encirclement of Paris, Governor Louis-Jules Trochu authorised a limited sortie to test Prussian positions west of the capital. General Auguste-Alexandre Ducrot, commanding the French 14th Army Corps, was tasked with probing the sector around Rueil, the Château of Malmaison, the hamlets of La Jonchère and Buzenval (in present-day Rueil-Malmaison), held by elements of the Prussian V Corps, parts of the IV Corps and detachments of the Guard Corps. the hamlets of Malmaison, la Jonchère, and the château of Buzenval.

Ducrot advanced with several columns supported by a strong reserve. After an extended artillery preparation, French infantry pushed forward, turning Malmaison, crossing the ravine of Saint-Cucufa and reaching the slopes of La Jonchère and the outskirts of Buzenval. Local gains were made in the Malmaison park, the Jonchère heights and the woods of Saint-Cucufa, but Prussian fire from fortified houses and woodland positions halted the advance.

By late afternoon Prussian counterattacks and the lack of support for the forward columns forced Ducrot to order a withdrawal. The sortie failed to disrupt the encirclement of Paris and ended in a German victory. French losses amounted to more than four hundred men, while German casualties were unknown.

== Background ==
In August 1870, after the destruction of the French field army at Sedan, the 3rd Army under Crown Prince Frederick advanced on Paris. Wilhelm I and Helmuth von Moltke started to encircle the city, beginning the siege in September. Inside Paris, General Louis-Jules Trochu commanded a large but uneven force totalling over 400,000 men, many of them untrained. As the encirclement tightened, French commanders planned limited sorties to test weak points in the Prussian line west of the city.

== Composition ==
The French Forces were organised into three groups plus reserves:

- The first group, commanded by General Henri Berthaut, had 3,400 infantry, 20 cannons, and a squadron of cavalry to operate between the Saint-Germain railway and upper Rueil.
- The second group, commanded by General Noël, had 1,350 infantry and 10 cannons to operate on the southern edge of the Malmaison park and in the ravine descending from the woods of Saint-Cucufa towards Bougival.
- The third group, commanded by Colonel Cholletou, had 1,600 infantry, 18 cannons, and a cavalry squadron to take up a forward position at the old mill above Rueil, linking and supporting the left and right columns.
- Two reserve forces were arranged, one on the left, under orders of General Martenot, with 2,600 infantry and 18 cannons. and one in the centre, commanded by General Paturel, with 2,000 infantry, 28 cannons, and 2 cavalry squadrons.

Based on contemporary accounts, the Prussian deployment in the sector formed a line from Croissy to Bougival. The VIII Division held the line through Croissy, Chatou and Le Vésinet. A battery was positioned behind the barricade at the entrance to Bougival. The first weight of the French attack fell on the X and IX Divisions of V Corps. Within these formations, Infantry Regiment No. 46 defended the ground around Malmaison, while Grenadier Regiment No. 6 held positions in the Bois Béranger.

== The battle ==
On 21 October 1870, during the siege of Paris, General Auguste-Alexandre Ducrot led a large reconnaissance and demonstrative sortie towards Rueil with the objective of taking the hamlets of la Jonchère, Buzenval and the sector around the Château of Malmaison (in present-day Rueil-Malmaison).

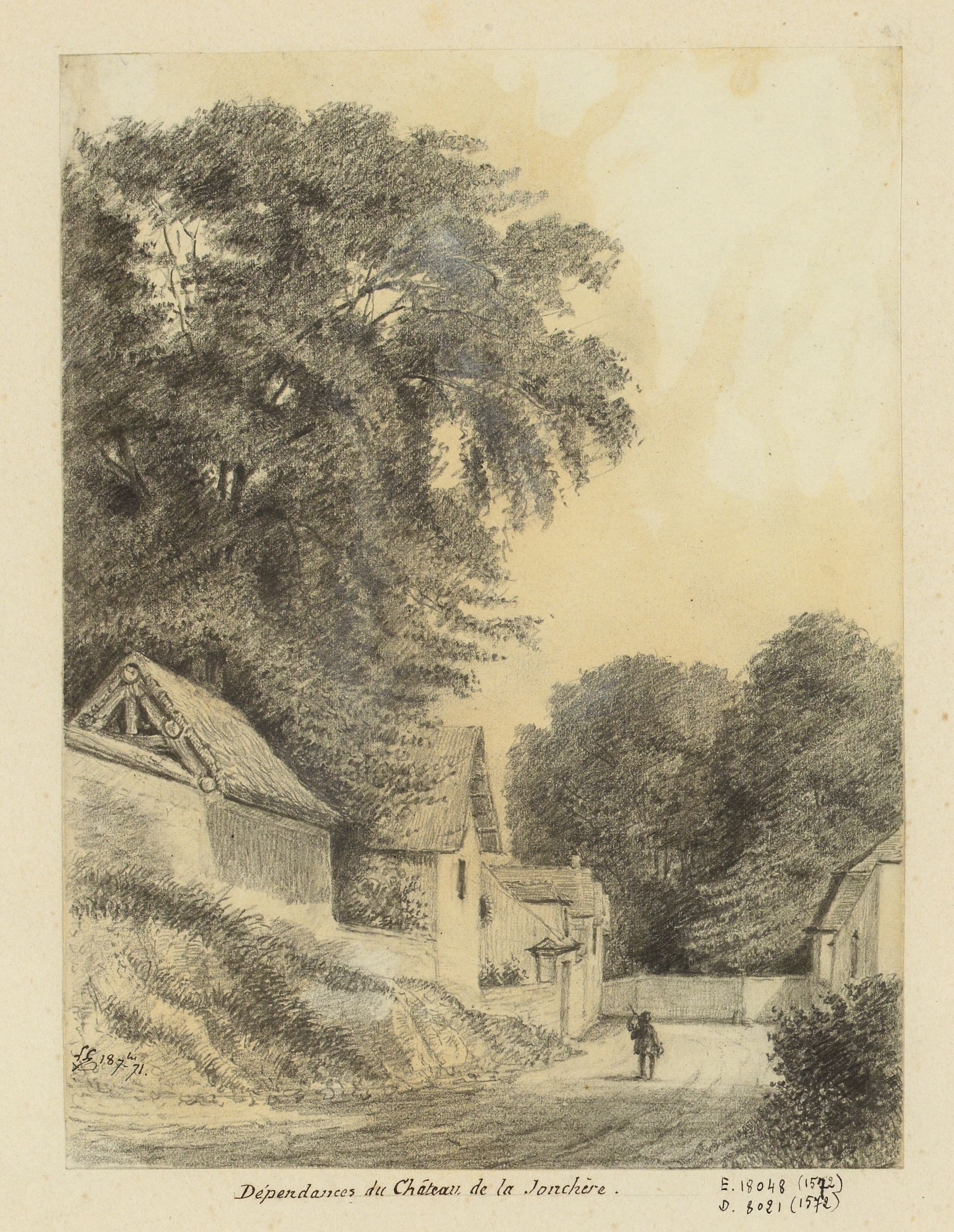
The hamlet of La Jonchère, one of the French objectives during the battle

Ducrot advanced towards Malmaison and Bougival with about 6,000 infantry, one squadron and 30 artillery pieces, supported by a reserve of 4,600 infantry, two squadrons and 46 guns. At 1 p.m. the French batteries opened fire and for three-quarters of an hour shelled Buzenval, Malmaison, la Jonchère and Bougival before the infantry moved forward.

The French columns had distinct objectives: Malmaison was assigned to the Berthaut and Noël columns, while Buzenval was the target of Cholletou's group. After the cannonade, the troops marched towards their objectives and reached the ravine descending from the woods of Saint-Cucufa towards the "American railway", turning Malmaison on their way. The left column under General Noël crossed the ravine and climbed the slopes rising to la Jonchère, but was soon halted by heavy musketry from loopholed houses and nearby woods where the Prussians had taken position.

At the same time, four companies of Zouaves under Commandant Jacquot were caught in the corner formed by the Malmaison Park below la Jonchère. They were able to disengage thanks to the intervention of a battalion of Seine-et-Marne mobiles, which moved onto the slopes above the Saint-Cucufa forest and supported the park, opening fire on the Prussians and forcing them to fall back, thus allowing the four Zouave companies to enter the park.

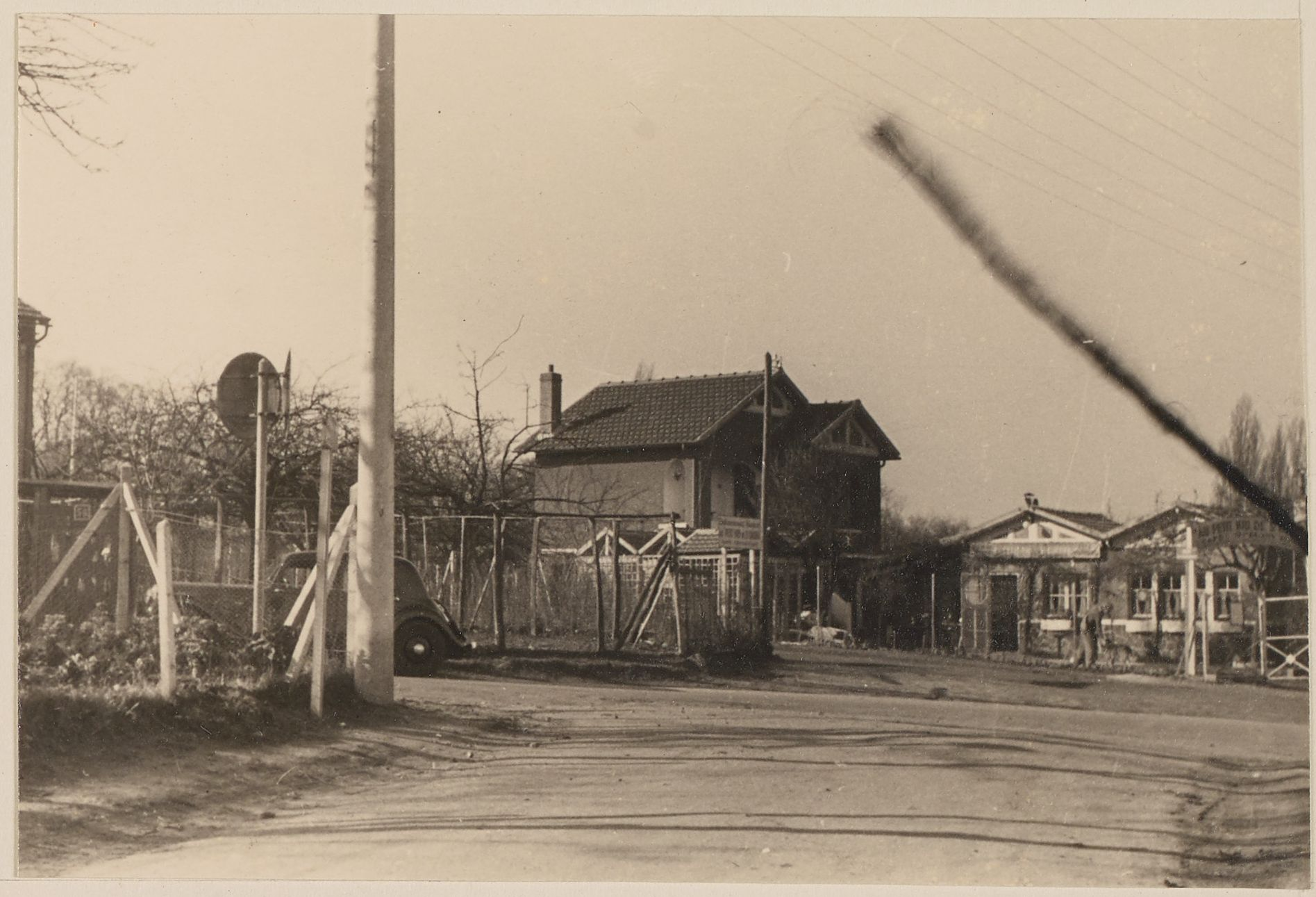
Porte de Longboyau at the entrance to the Bois de Saint-Cucufa, where fighting took place.

Near the gate of Longboyau, a French battery lost its captain, ten gunners, fifteen horses, and two guns in the close fighting. The incident was later remembered in French accounts as the "defence of the gate of Longboyau", and later depicted by Alphonse de Neuville in his painting Défense de la porte de Longboyau, château de Buzenval. Meanwhile, the snipers of the second column, commanded by Captain Favre-Biguet of the Cholletou column, pushed into Buzenval, entered the village and advanced under cover of the woods to the edge of the Saint-Cucufa forest. Around 5 p.m. nightfall brought an end to the fighting, and General Ducrot ordered the troops to return to their barracks in Paris.

According to contemporary parliamentary testimony, the 21 October sortie was conceived as a demonstrative attack on Malmaison under Ducrot's overall command of the 14th Army Corps during the first phase of the siege. General de Bellemare noted that Trochu, while governor of Paris, did not appear on the battlefield, and records of the Government of National Defence show that on the same day he attended a council session where he spoke at length about the expulsion of foreign nationals from the capital instead of supervising operations at the front. The battle cost the French around five hundred killed and wounded, with a further hundred and twenty taken prisoner and two guns lost. Prussian losses were estimated at roughly four hundred men incapacitated.

== Aftermath ==
The offensive movement of 21 October ultimately failed for lack of measures to support the engaged columns and to exploit the initial successes they achieved. Joanne notes that the German investment line was relatively weak at this point and that for a moment it appeared possible the French might threaten Versailles. It was reported that the baggage of the Prussian king and part of his staff had even begun to leave the headquarters. The Germans learning the lessons from the attack strengthened the sector, which soon became one of their strongest positions around Paris.

The Château de Malmaison, damaged by artillery fire during the fighting and subsequently pillaged, was converted into a barracks before being put up for sale in March 1877.

== Sources ==
- Duquet, Alfred (1893). Guerre de 1870-1871: Paris. La Malmaison, le Bourget et le trente-et-un octobre, 21 octobre-1er novembre (in French). Charpentier.
- Joanne, Adolphe Laurent (1878). Environs de Paris (in French). Hachette.
- Kalenitchenko, Liliane (1 January 1991). Les riches heures de Rueil-Malmaison (in French). FeniXX. ISBN 978-2-307-55999-3.
- Le Journal du Siège de Paris, publié par le Gaulois (in French). Dentu. 1871.
- Paradis, Jacques-Henry (1872). Journal du siège (1870-1871) par un bourgeois de Paris (in French). Dentu.
- Showalter, Professor Dennis (16 September 2013). Imperial Wars 1815–1914. Amber Books Ltd. ISBN 978-1-78274-125-1.
- Wawro, Geoffrey (25 August 2003). The Franco-Prussian War: The German Conquest of France in 1870-1871. Cambridge University Press. ISBN 978-0-521-58436-4.

== See also ==
- Battle of Buzenval (1871)
