= Battle of Le Bourget =

Coordinates: 48.9353°N 2.4256°E

First battle of Le Bourget
- Part of Franco-Prussian War
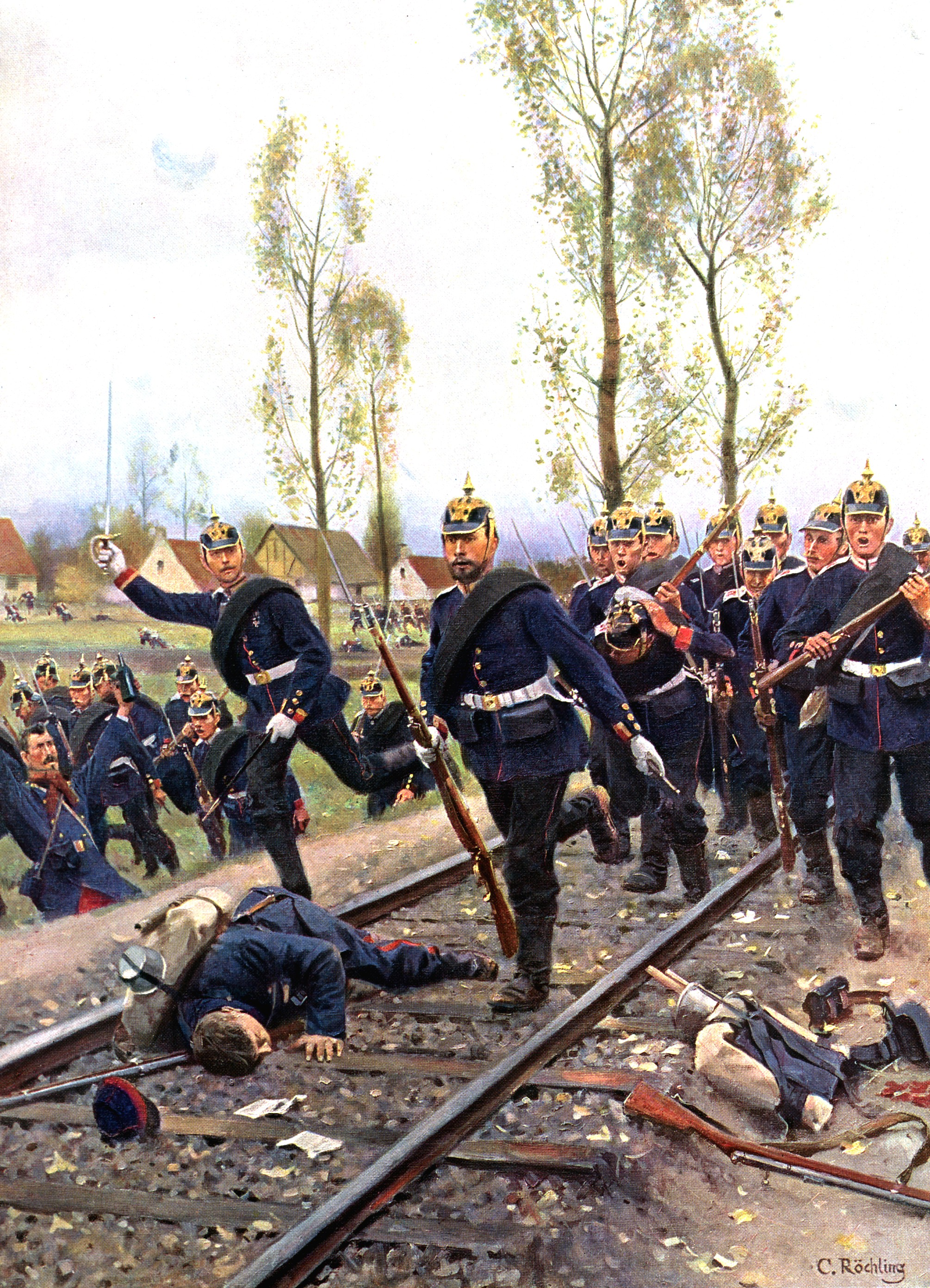
| Date | 27–30 October 1870 |
| Location | Le Bourget, France |
| Result | Prussian victory |

Belligerents
| North German Confederation: Prussia | French Republic |

Commanders and leaders
| Albert of Saxony; Rudolph Otto von Budritzki | Carey de Bellemare |

Strength
| 6,000 | 8,000 |

Casualties and losses
| 500 dead and wounded | 1,400 dead and wounded 1,200 captured |

The First battle of Le Bourget was part of the siege of Paris during the Franco-Prussian War, fought between 27 and 30 October 1870.

== Background ==
General Carey de Bellemare commanded the northern section of the Paris defenses, which, being in the vicinity of Saint Denis, was considered the strongest point. Facing de Bellemare was a German salient in the town of Le Bourget, which was held by the Prussian Guard of the Army of the Meuse. The salient at Le Bourget left the Guard isolated and vulnerable. De Bellemare grew restless at the inactivity of the Paris defenses, which were under the overall command of Louis Jules Trochu.

== The battle ==
On 27 October 1870, without authorization from Trochu, de Bellemare attacked Le Bourget. Taken by surprise, the Prussian Guard fell back from the city. News of de Bellemare's victory was greatly welcomed by the citizens but when he asked for reinforcements to hold the position, Trochu refused. Ironically both sides felt the same way about the village of Le Bourget. Both Trochu and the Prussian Guard felt the village offered no strategic advantage and was vulnerable to enemy artillery. To the Guardsmen, the end of the war was in sight and felt that a counter-attack would only cause more bloodshed over an unnecessary objective. However, the commander of the Prussian Army of the Meuse, Crown Prince Albert of Saxony, felt otherwise. He ordered the village be retaken on 30 October. Despite their reservations about the counter-attack, the Prussian Guard fought well. Three columns converged on Le Bourget, one in the center and one on each flank. The French were driven through the streets and lost 1,200 captured to the Prussians.

Among those who lost their lives at the battle was Siegfried Karfunkelstein, who was mortally wounded when he stormed the first barricade, while rescuing the regimental flag from the hands of the enemy.

== Aftermath ==
Parisians had rejoiced at the news of the capture of Le Bourget, but were now disheartened to hear that it had been taken back by the Prussians. Even though he had never wanted an attack on the village, Trochu received much of the blame for the defeat. Even worse news than the defeat at Le Bourget began to fill the streets of Paris; that of the fall of Metz. With these two defeats, French morale began to sink within Paris.

== Sources ==
- Howard, Michael The Franco Prussian War ISBN 0-415-26671-8
