= Édouard Detaille =

French painter (1848–1912)

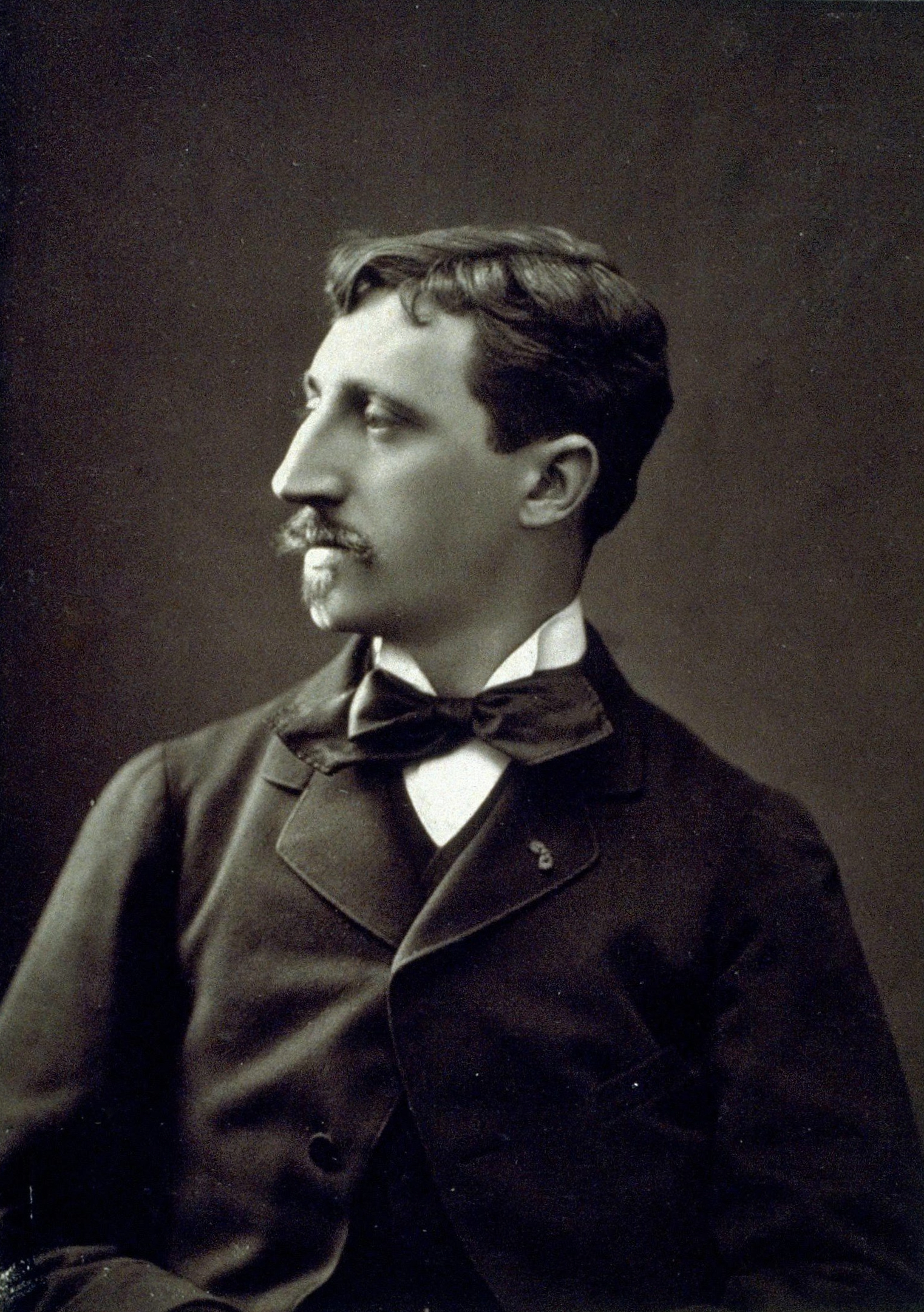
- Born: Jean-Baptiste Édouard Detaille; 5 October 1848; Paris, France
- Died: 23 December 1912 (aged 64); Paris, France
- Known for: Painting
- Notable work: The Defense of Champigny (1879); Le Rêve (1888)
- Movement: Academic art

Jean-Baptiste Édouard Detaille (French pronunciation: [ʒɑ̃batist‿edwaʁ dətaj]; 5 October 1848 – 23 December 1912) was a French academic painter and military artist noted for his precision and realistic detail. He was regarded as the "semi-official artist of the French army."

== Biography ==
=== Education and early career ===
Detaille was born in Paris and grew up in Picardy. His was a prosperous military family; his grandfather had been an arms supplier for Napoleon. An amateur artist who was friends with a number of collectors and painters, including Horace Vernet, Detaille's father encouraged his son's artistic endeavors. He began his artistic studies at age seventeen under the famous military painter Jean-Louis-Ernest Meissonier; he had originally approached him to ask for an introduction to the renowned Alexandre Cabanel but Meissonier decided to teach Detaille himself. Meissonier became a major influence on his style, and it was he who inculcated an appreciation for accuracy and precision in Detaille.

Detaille made his debut as an artist at the Salon—the official art exhibition of the Académie des Beaux-Arts—of 1867 with a painting of Meissonier's studio. At the Salon of 1868, he exhibited his first military painting, The Drummers Halt, which was based solely on his imagination of the French Revolution. With Repose During the Drill, Camp St Maur, which he debuted the following year, Detaille established his reputation as a painter. In the spring of 1870, he went on a "sketching trip" to Algeria with three other young painters, Étienne-Prosper Berne-Bellecour, Alexander Louis Leloir, and Jehan Georges Vibert.

=== Franco-Prussian War ===
Detaille enlisted in the 8th Mobile Bataillon of the French Army when the Franco-Prussian War broke out in 1870; by November he was seeing and experiencing the realities of war. This experience allowed him to produce his famed portraits of soldiers and historically accurate depictions of military manoeuvres, uniforms, and military life in general. He eventually became the official painter of the battles. He published a book called L'Armée Française in 1885, which contains over 300 line drawings and 20 color reproductions of his works.

Detaille was one of the first artists to buy photographs from Eugène Atget.

=== Later life ===
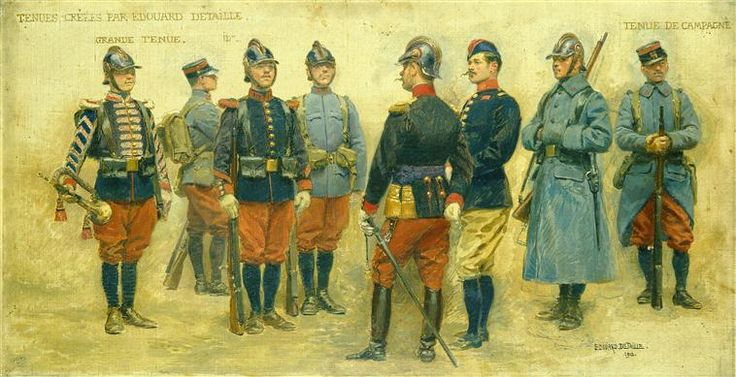
Test uniforms created in 1912 by Édouard Detaille for the French line infantry. From left to right: trumpet in parade uniform, private in service uniform and kepi, private 1st class in parade uniform, private in service uniform and leather helmet, officer in parade uniform, officer in service uniform and bonnet de police (side cap), private in field uniform and leather helmet, private in field uniform and kepi.

In 1912, Detaille created new uniforms for the French army. They were never adopted by the Minister of War, but the blue-gray greatcoats would influence later French World War I uniforms, and the Adrian helmet was heavily influenced by his designs.

During his life, he had amassed an impressive collection of military uniforms and artifacts. He bequeathed the collection to the Musée de l'Armée in Paris following his death in 1912 in Paris.

== Literary references ==
Detaille appears as a guest at a party at the home of the Princesse de Guermante in Part Two: Chapter One of Marcel Proust's novel Cities of the Plain, where Detaille is referred to as "the creator of the Dream", his 1888 painting also known as Le Rêve which shows soldiers asleep on a battlefield dreaming of military glory. The painting, which is in the Musée d'Orsay in Paris, also appears in Paintings in Proust by Eric Karpeles, published by Thames & Hudson.

== Family ==
His niece married Charles Otzenberger, who subsequently called himself Otzenberger-Detaille.

== Gallery ==
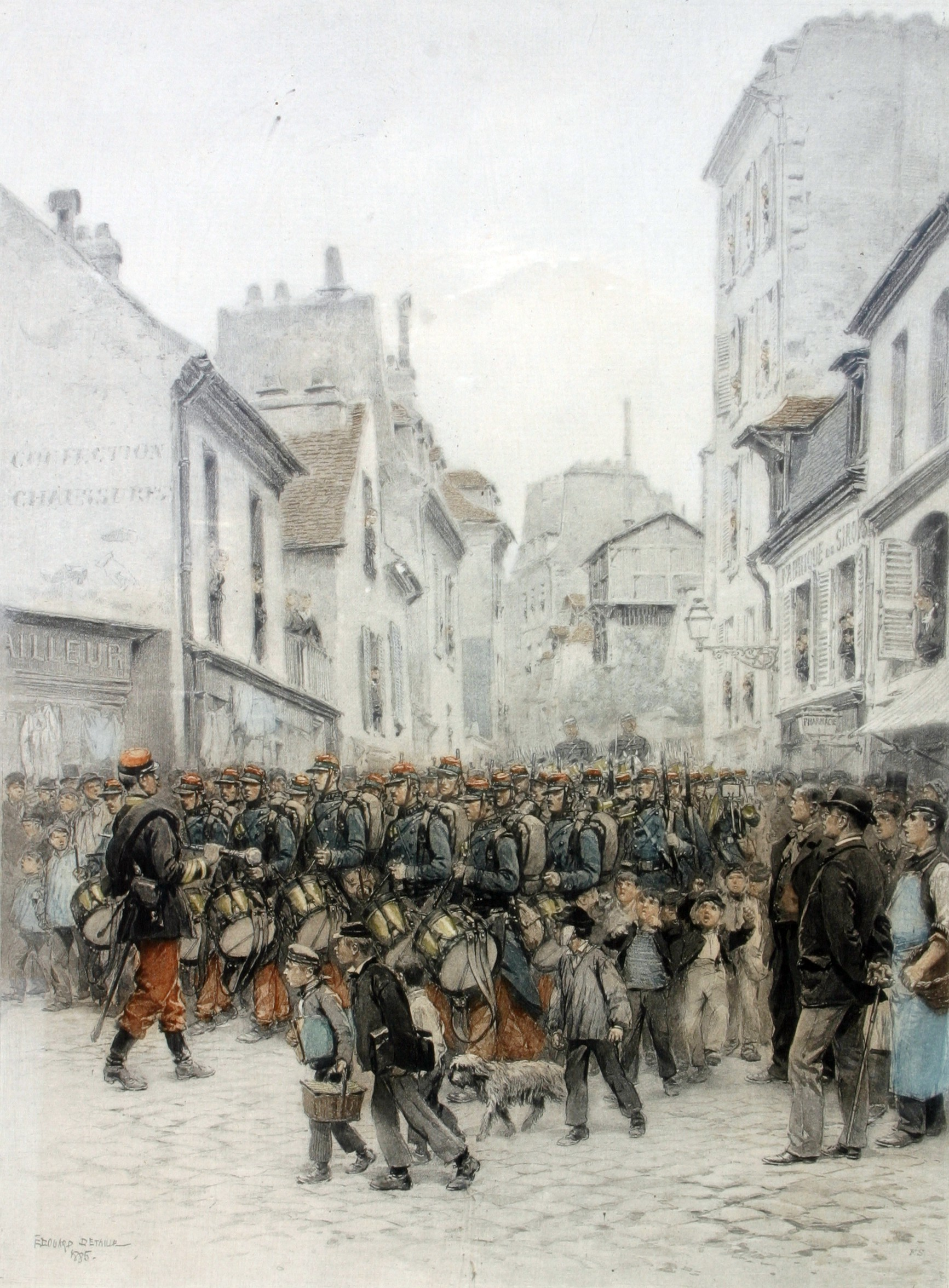
Print by Detaille, 1885

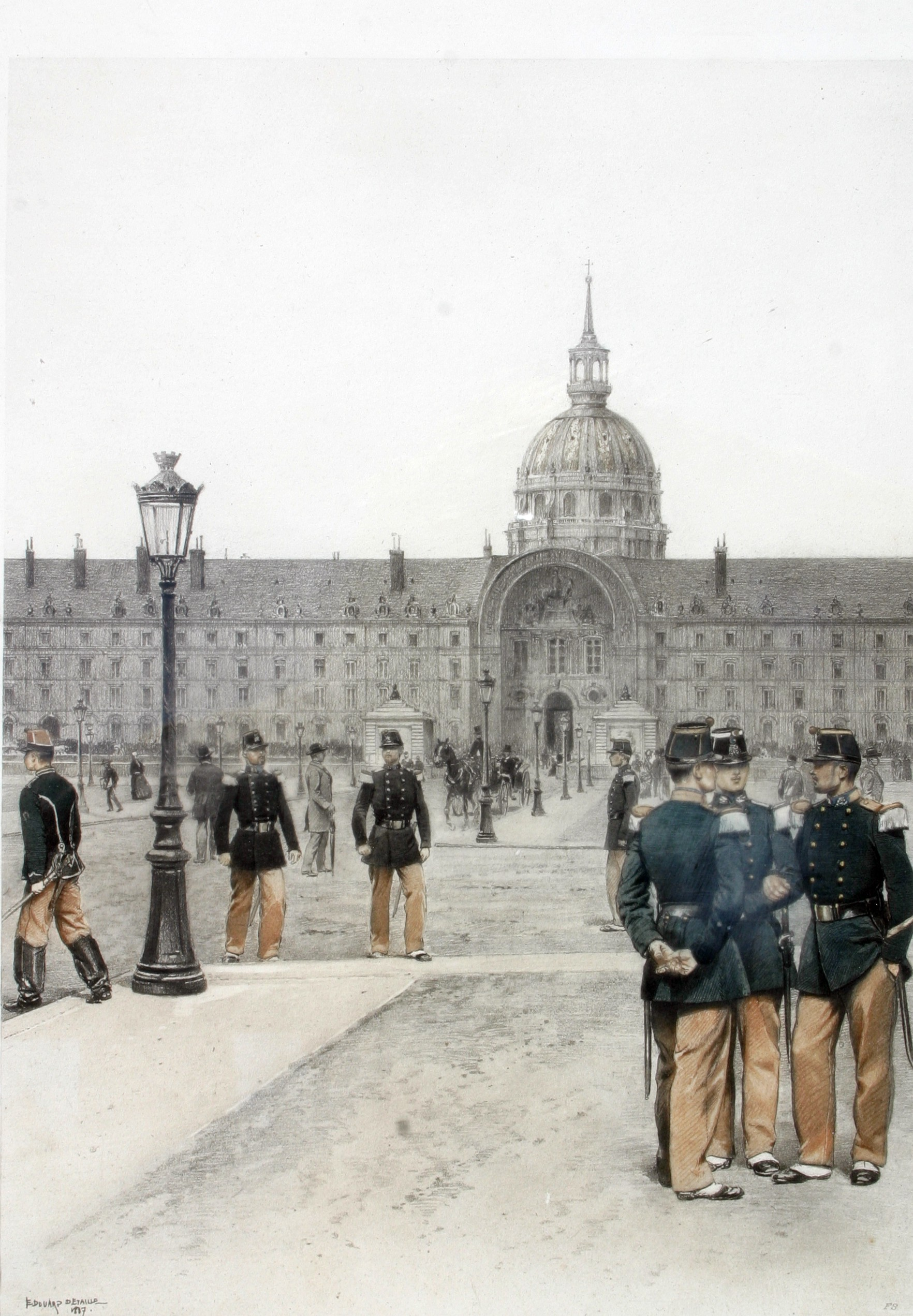
Cavaliers de remonte Commis - Cavriers Secretaire et Infirmiers, 1887

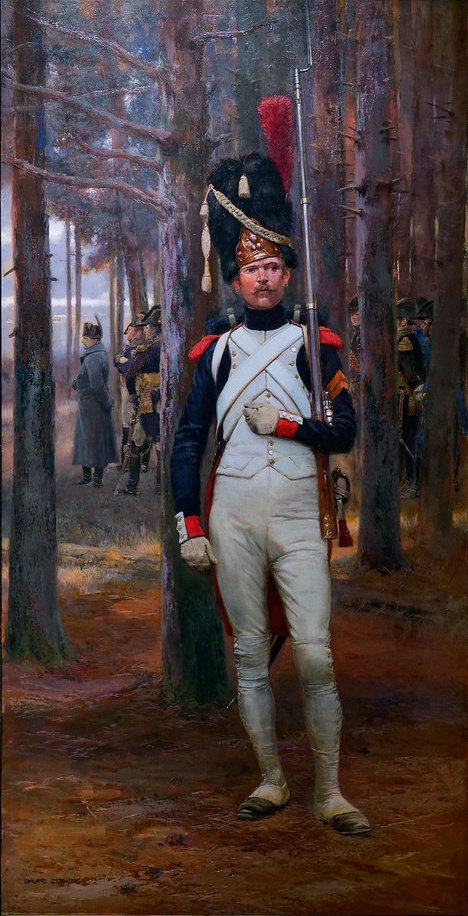
Grenadier of the Old Guard

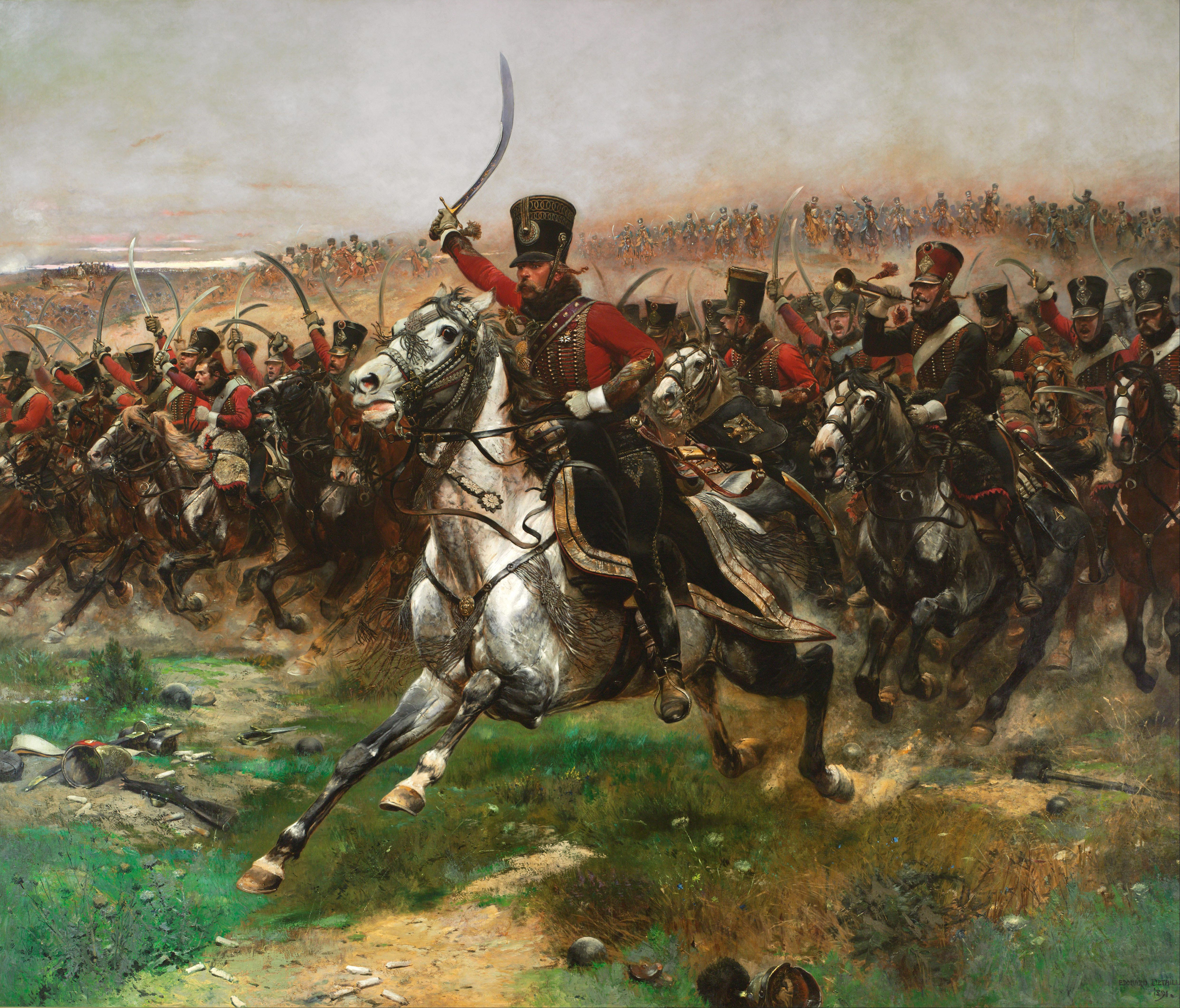
Vive L’Empereur!, 1891

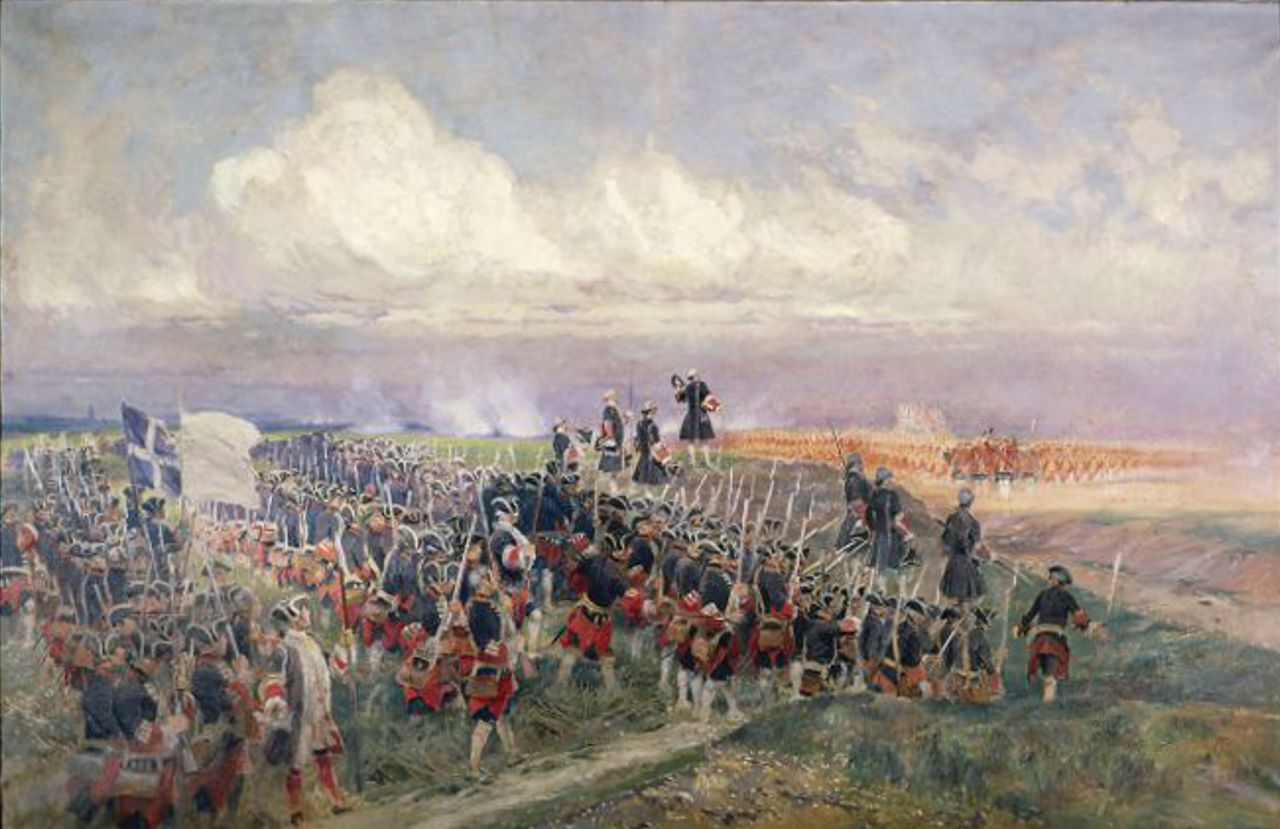
The Battle of Fontenoy

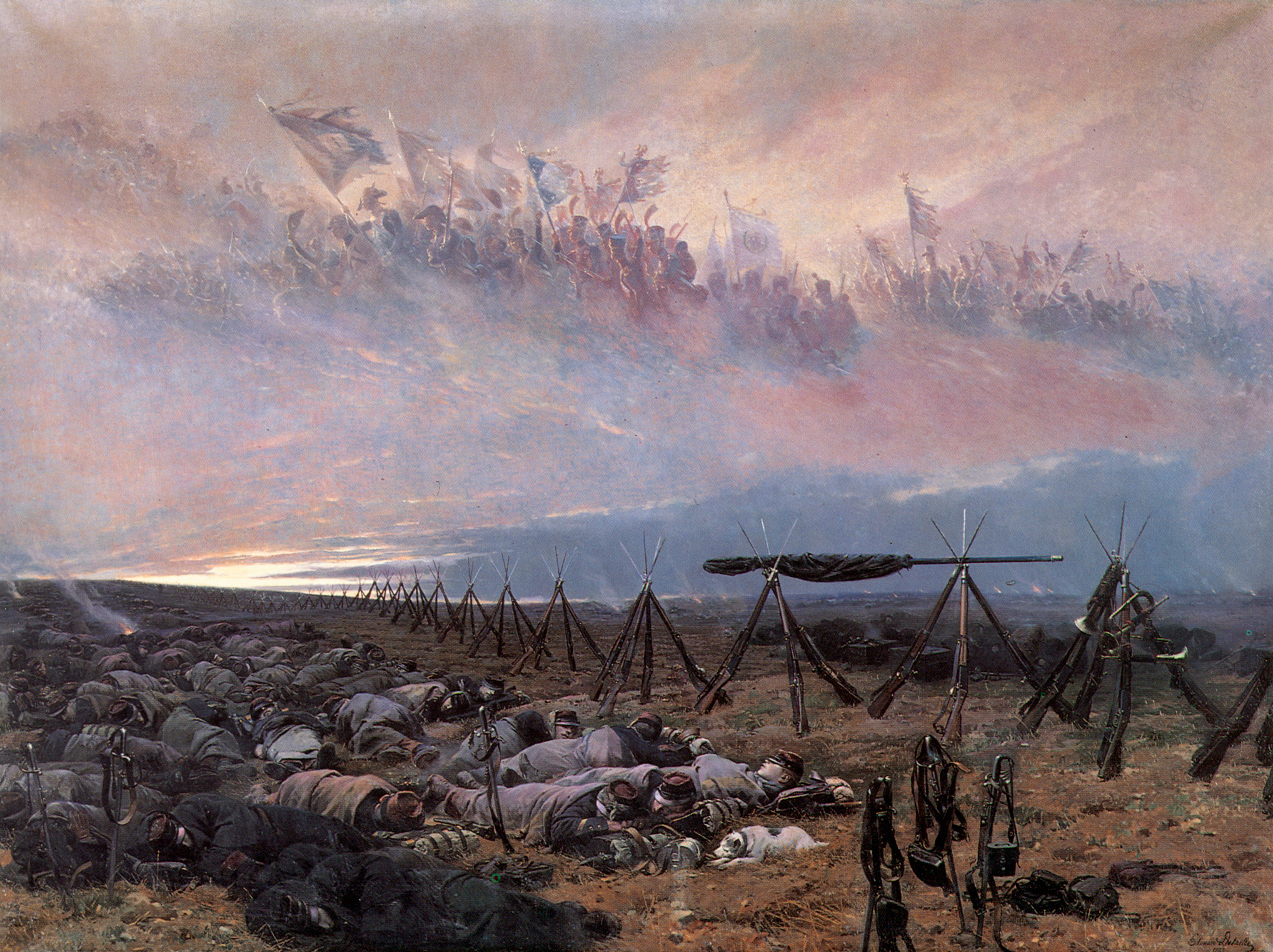
Le Rêve, 1888

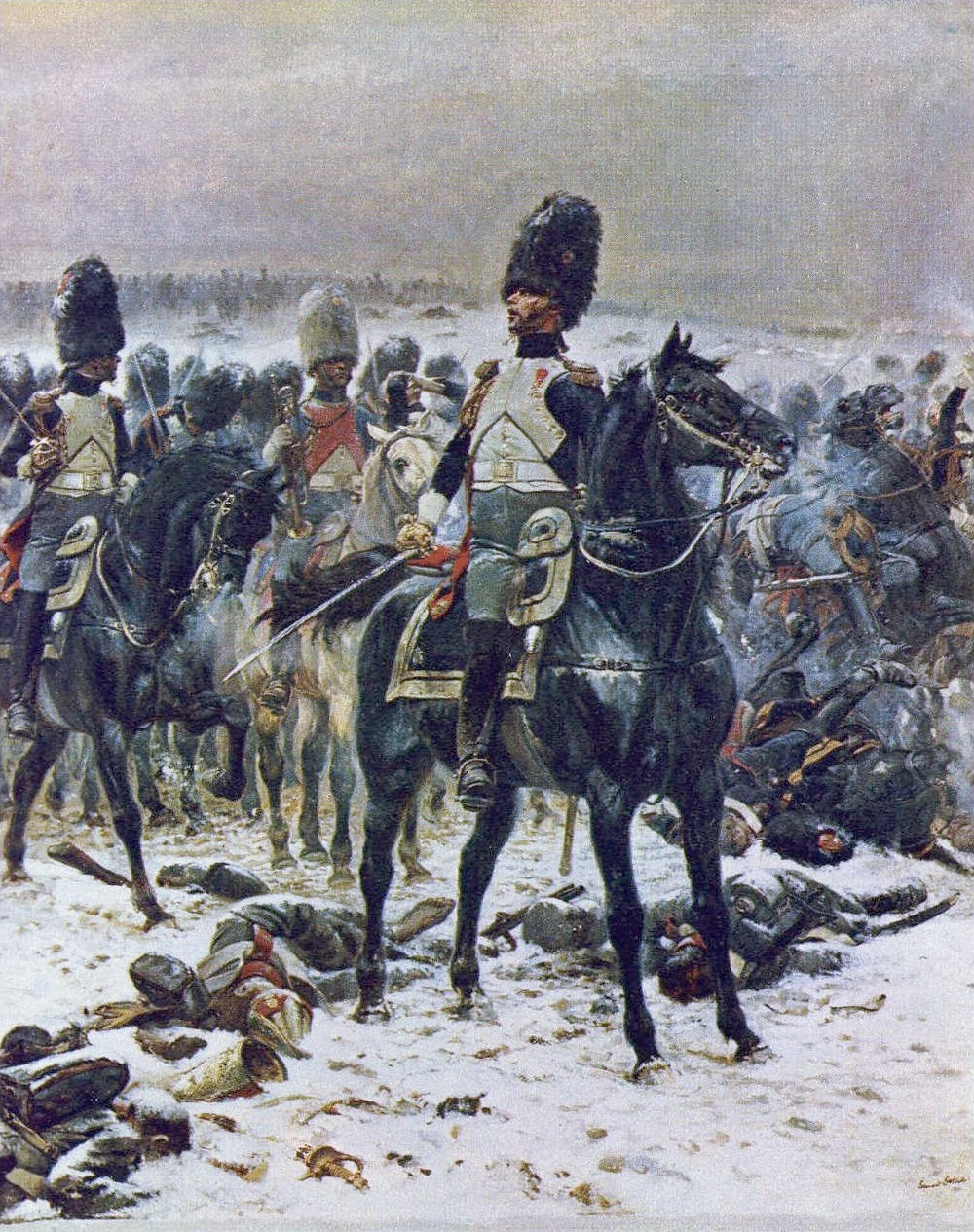
Les grenadiers à cheval à la bataille d'Eylau : Haut les têtes (le colonel Lepic), 1893

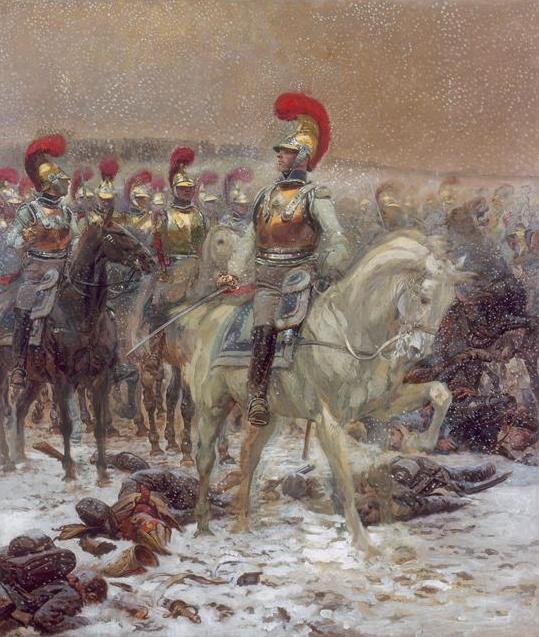
Carabiniers à Cheval en Russie, 1893

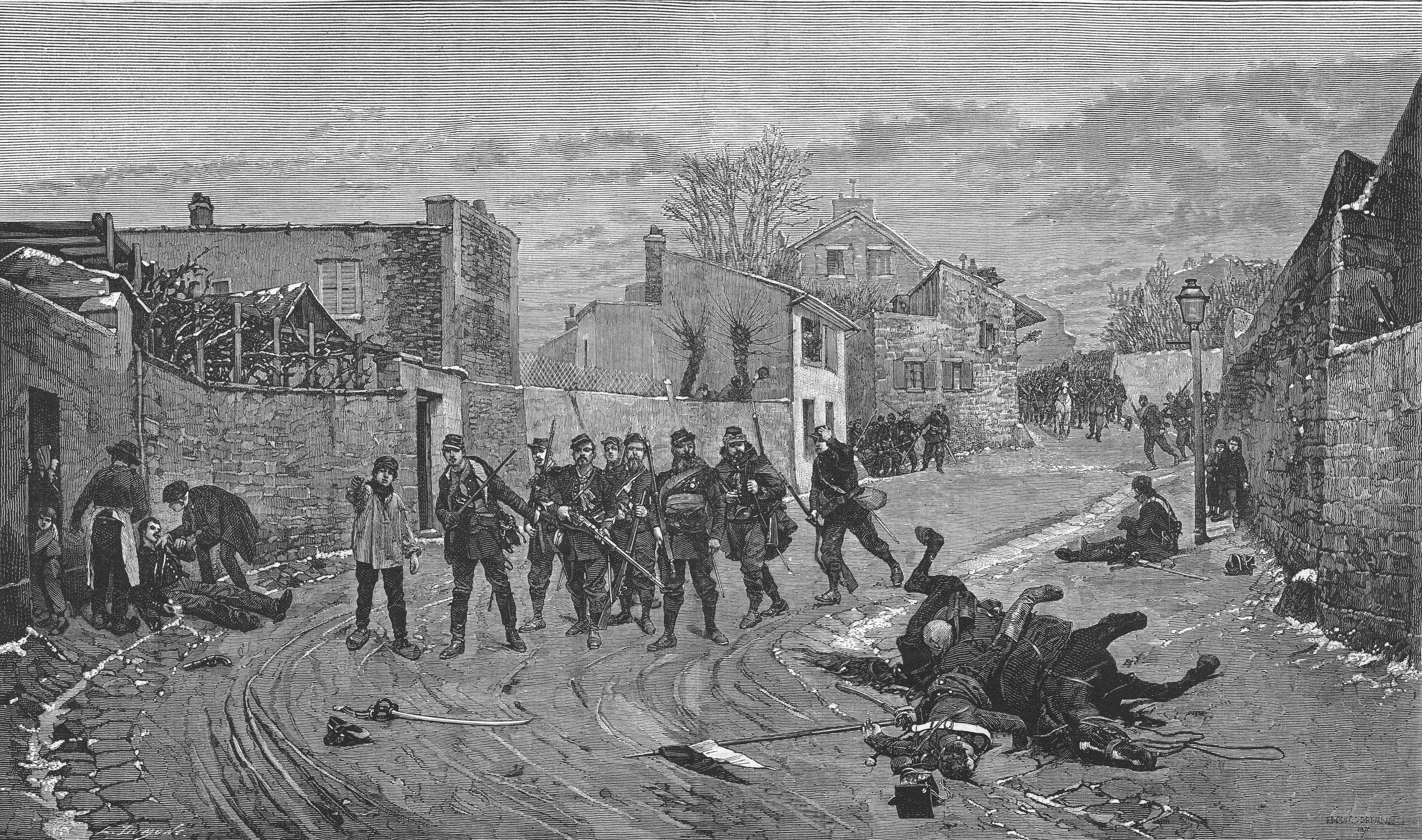
En Reconnaissance, 1876

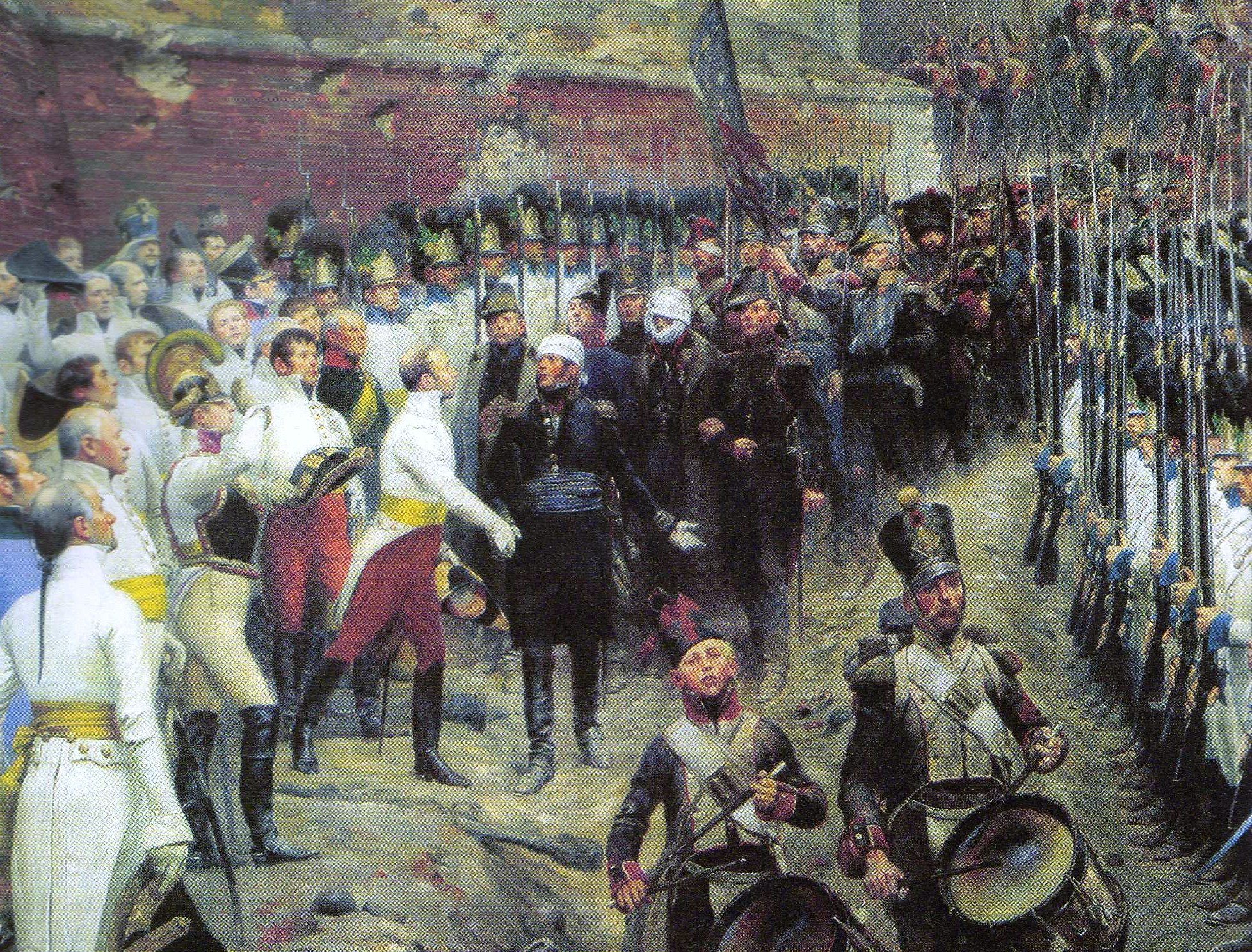
Sortie de la garrison de Huningue

== See also ==
- Academic art
- Military art
