= Battle of Buzenval (1871) =

Part of the Franco-Prussian War

Coordinates: 48.8778°N 2.1813°E

- Part of the siege of Paris and the Franco-Prussian War
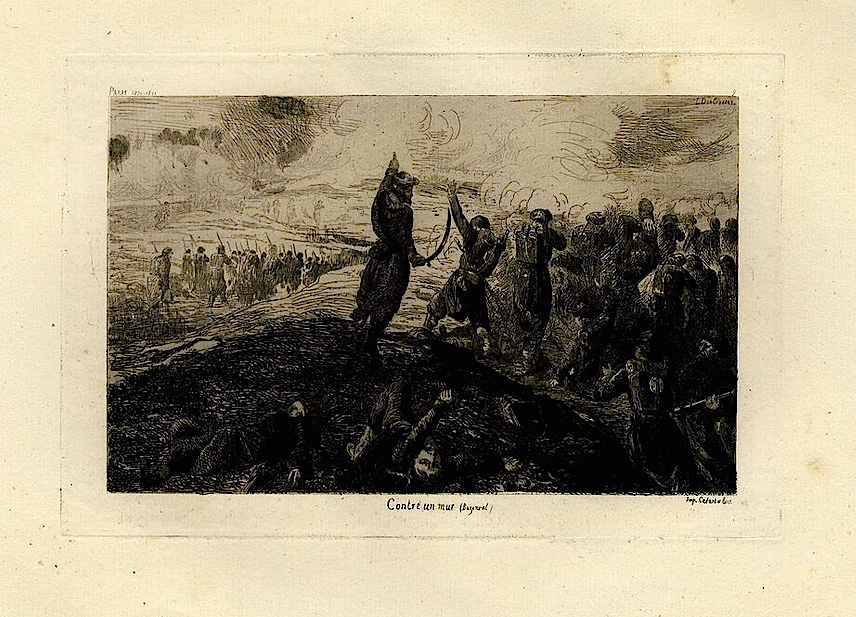
| Date | 19–20 January 1871 |
| Location | Saint-Cloud, France |
| Result | German victory |

Belligerents
| German Empire | French Republic |

Commanders and leaders
| (German Empire) Crown Prince Friedrich | (French Third Republic) Louis Jules Trochu |

Strength
| 23,000 | 83,000 |

Casualties and losses
| 700 | 4,000 |

The (Second) Battle of Buzenval, also known as the Battle of Mont Valérien, was part of the siege of Paris during the Franco-Prussian War. On 19 January 1871, the day after Wilhelm I was proclaimed German Emperor, Louis Jules Trochu attacked the Germans west of Paris in Buzenval Park. The attackers seized the town of Saint-Cloud, coming close to the new Emperor's headquarters at Versailles. Trochu was able to maintain his position at St Cloud for most of the day, but the failure of other French forces to hold their positions left him isolated and the Crown Prince's army was able to force Trochu's salient back into Paris by the next day. This was the last effort to break out of Paris. Trochu turned over command of the Paris defenses to Joseph Vinoy who negotiated the surrender of the city ten days later.

The French painter and National Guard officer Ernest Meissonier was one of those who worked to recover the French wounded from the field. Fellow painter Henri Regnault was among those killed in action, shot through the head by a bullet.

== Sources ==
- Battles & Leaders

== See also ==
- Battle of Buzenval (1870)
