= Auguste-Alexandre Ducrot =

French general (1817–1882)

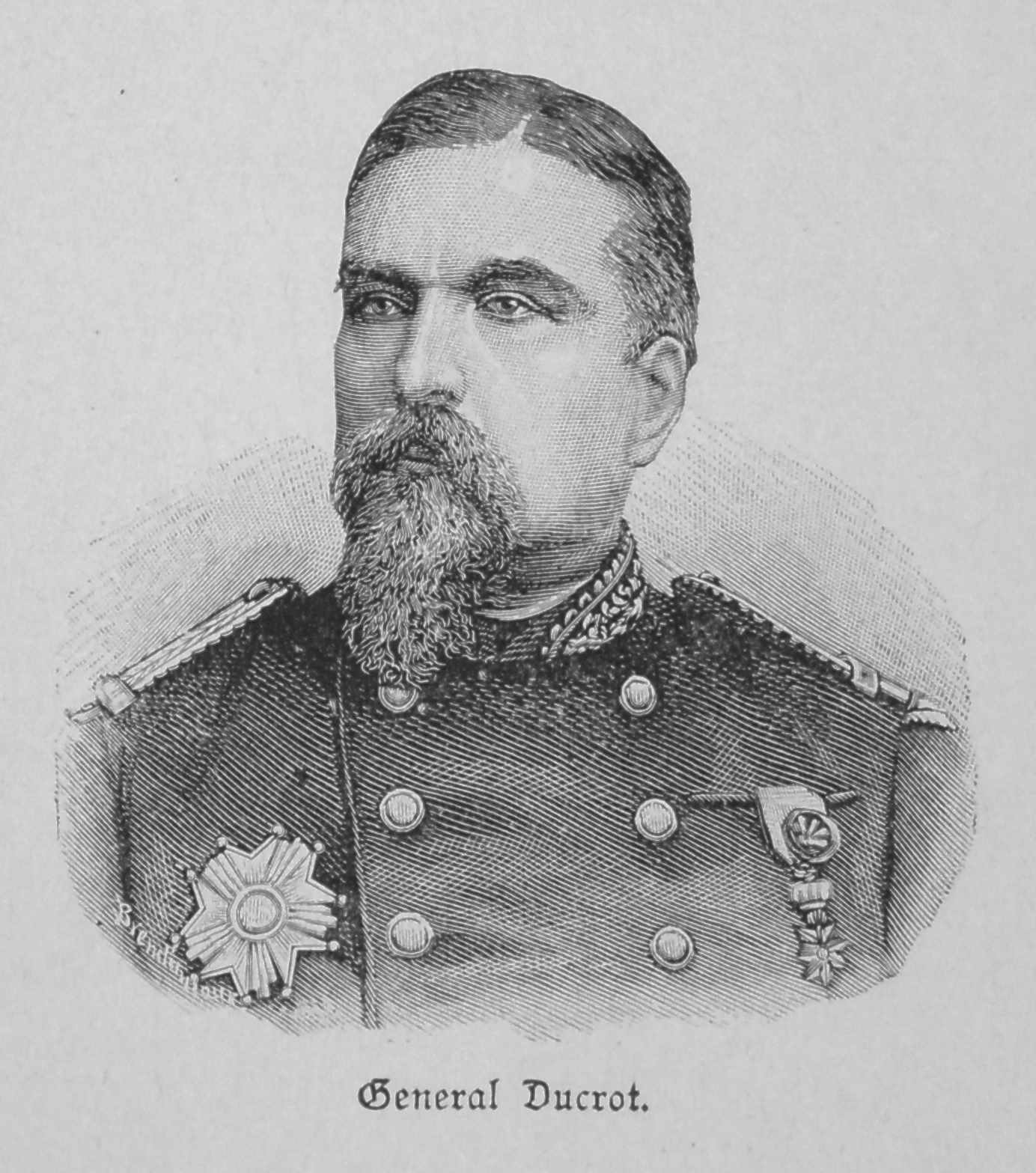
- Born: 24 February 1817; Nevers, France
- Died: 16 August 1882 (aged 65); Versailles, France
- Military career
- Allegiance: Kingdom of France; French Second Republic; Second French Empire; French Third Republic
- Branch: French Army
- Service years: 1835–1882
- Rank: Général de Division
- Conflicts: Crimean War; Franco-Prussian War
- Awards: Legion of Honour (Grand Officier)

Auguste-Alexandre Ducrot (French pronunciation: [oɡyst alɛksɑ̃dʁ dykʁo]; 24 February 1817 – 16 August 1882) was a French general. Ducrot served in the Crimean War, Algeria, the Italian campaign of 1859, and as a division commander in the Franco-Prussian War.

At the outbreak of the Franco-Prussian War, Ducrot was tasked with overseeing the deployment of French forces due to his familiarity with the terrain near Wissembourg. His unsupported division was surprised and defeated by a large force of Prussians and Bavarians at the Battle of Wissembourg. At the Battle of Sedan on 1 September 1870, he succeeded to command of the French army when Marshal MacMahon was wounded early in the morning. By that time, it was obvious that a disastrous defeat was inevitable. Ducrot summed up the situation with the famous remark:

« Nous sommes dans un pot de chambre, et nous y serons emmerdés. » ("We are in a chamber pot, and we're going to be shit on.")

Ducrot ordered the army to withdraw, but then General de Wimpffen presented a commission authorizing him to succeed MacMahon. Wimpffen overruled Ducrot, and ordered a counterattack that failed completely. Emperor Napoleon III, present on the battlefield, then surrendered the army to the Prussians.

With de Wimpffen having insisted on command, Ducrot refused to accept responsibility for signing the articles of surrender and was imprisoned by the Prussians. He soon escaped, and took part in the Siege of Paris. Ducrot commanded the most important French attack against the Prussian besiegers (the Battle of Villiers, 29 November–3 December 1870). After the defeat of this attack, Ducrot urged the French government to make peace. Cyclist Maarten Ducrot is his great-grandson.
