= Moulins Ball =

Failed method of sending mail into Paris

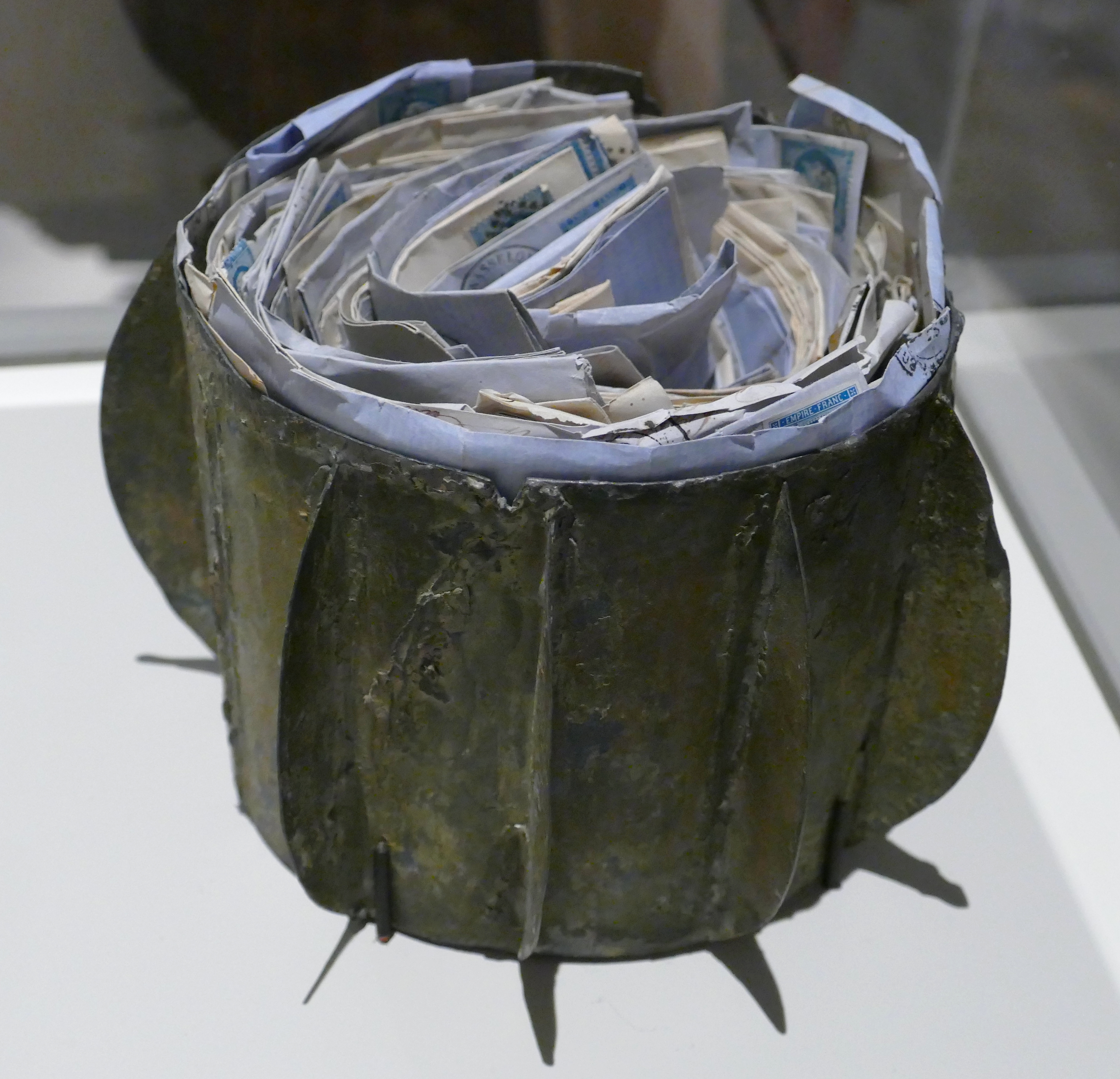
- A Boule de Moulins, filled with artificial correspondence (Musée de La Poste, Paris).
- Date: January 1871
- Location: France
- Cause: Need for mail transport between Paris and the provinces during the Prussian siege
- Participants: Pierre-Charles Delort, Émile (or Louis-Émile) Robert, Isca (or Jacques) Vonoven
- Outcome: Complete failure, none of the 55 balls reached Paris in time

A Boule de Moulins was a method of transporting mail from the provinces to the city of Paris, used during the siege of the 1870 war. As the mail to be transported in this way in hollow spheres is first centralized in Moulins (Allier), these balls are called "de Moulins".

Three people came up with the idea of placing the mail in watertight zinc cylinders, given a spherical shape by means of fins, which were immersed in the Seine well upstream of Paris, not far from Montereau-Fault-Yonne. Rolling downstream on the river bed, these balls were to pass through the lines of the besiegers and be collected in a net set up on the outskirts of the capital. However, operations were delayed by lengthy discussions with the Post administration, as winter advanced and ice encumbered the course of the Seine.

Despite promising trials, the process proved a complete failure, with none of the 55 Moulins balls dropped between January 5 and 28, 1871 reaching Paris before the end of the siege, although more than half of them have since been found, from the Seine-et-Marne to the mouth of the Seine. The letters they contained were handed over to their addressees or descendants, or found their way into the collections of the Musée de La Poste and private collections.

== Maintaining contact between Paris and the provinces ==
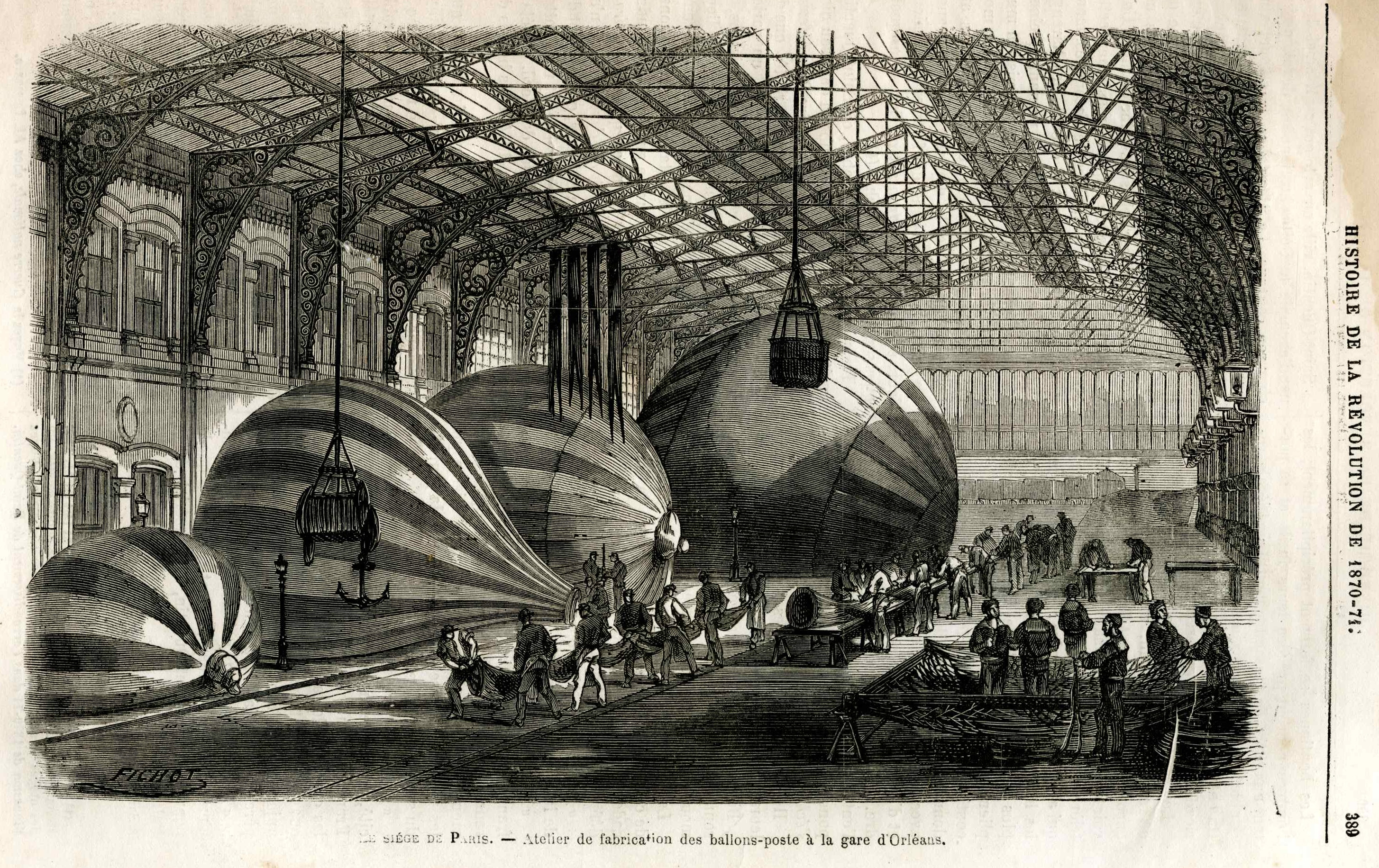
Balloon-making workshop (Gare d'Austerlitz).

Continued correspondence between the provinces and the capital, which had been under siege by the Prussian army since September 19, 1870, was of the utmost importance. The exchange of information on the military situation was vital; soldiers on the battlefields needed the moral support of their families back in Paris, to whom they wanted to give news in return; the besieged, for their part, needed to continue to feel connected to the provinces.

Various means were used to try and maintain this relational bridge through the exchange of mail, but mainly in the Paris-province direction, such as the balloon mail, which could carry several bags of mail; for the duration of the siege, 67 of these balloons were produced in the Gare du Nord, Gare de l'Est and Gare d'Orléans, which were free of rail traffic at the time.

In the other direction, the problem was more complex. The air route was difficult to use: only carrier pigeons managed to enter the capital, but their numbers were insufficient for the volume to be transported, and the failure rate was high. Roads were blocked and the gates of Paris guarded: messengers attempting to break the blockade were shot as spies after an expeditious military trial, and dogs trained to enter the city were shot on sight. Trains stopped running, and the Prussians watched and patrolled the Seine, preventing the passage of anything floating on the river's surface.

== Principle, description and tests ==
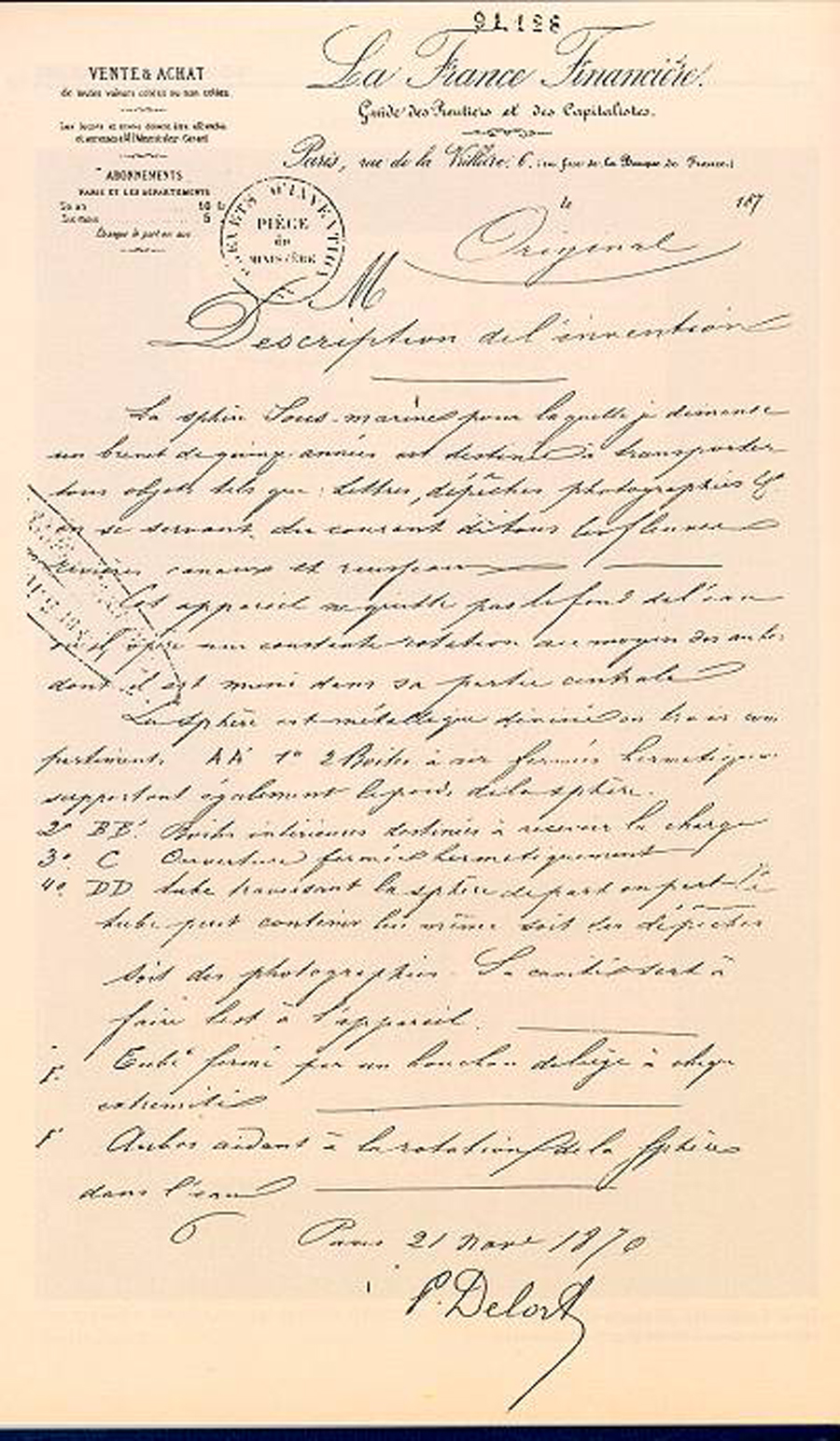
Delort patents his "underwater sphere".

As early as September 1870, Mr. Castillon de Saint-Victor was considering the idea of using the Seine's current to carry watertight balls containing mail, based on the "message in a bottle" principle. He proposed devices that would float below the surface, releasing a small flag once they entered Paris to signal their presence. The project was quickly abandoned as too complicated and risky to implement.

Schematic cross-section of a Moulins ball.

However, the idea was explored again at the beginning of the following month, but to thwart the besiegers' surveillance, the balls must not float on the surface or between two bodies of water. Their density was calculated so that they would roll along the bottom, carried along by the current.

Three people, Pierre-Charles Delort, Émile (or Louis-Émile) Robert and Isca (or Jacques) Vonoven, developed a system based on the manufacture of zinc cylinders, a metal unaffected by water, which were watertight once the lid had been welded on. The device conceived by the three men, who did not seem to have been aware of Castillon de Saint-Victor's project, was perhaps inspired by the one used for tobacco smuggling on the French-Belgian border, in the waters of the Yser. The hollow cylinder was fitted with twelve turbine blade-like vanes designed to rotate it in the river current. With a total mass of just over 2 kg, the whole unit was shaped like a sphere and could hold between 500 and 600 letters, each weighing no more than 4 grams, including the envelope, written on peel-off paper. The cylinders had a small ballast at either end, which could be filled at will with water to balance the unit according to the weight of the letters it contained.

The patent was filed by Delort on November 21, 1870. Two successive experiments, carried out over short distances in the Bièvre at Arcueil, followed by another on December 1 and 2, 1870 over a longer distance at Port à l'Anglais in the Seine, were conclusive: balls thrown into the water were caught in the nets designed to stop them; in the case of the Bièvre, the clarity of the water even made it possible to follow them on their way. The principle therefore seemed applicable on a much larger scale.

== Implementation ==
=== Bargaining and influence struggles ===
==== First contract, with Germain Rampont ====
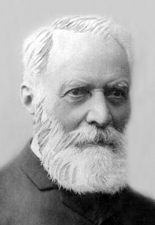
Germain Rampont

Robert met General Trochu in early October 1870 (they had met in Algeria twenty years earlier); Trochu showed great interest, and Robert immediately submitted the project to Germain Rampont, General Manager of the Post, who had remained in Paris. Once the tests had been carried out, Rampont drew up a contract on December 6, authorizing the implementation of this mail delivery service. Although the document was financially very interesting for the designers, it was vague on many practical details: for example, the collection point, Clermont-Ferrand, was only agreed verbally, and although the amount of the remuneration for the operators was fixed, the payment terms were not specified. Delort and Robert left the capital the following night aboard the Denis Papin balloon mail, which took off from the esplanade of the Gare d'Orléans. They took mail bond to the provinces with them, a few balls made in Paris and the contract signed by Rampont and approved by the Minister of Finance, Ernest Picard.

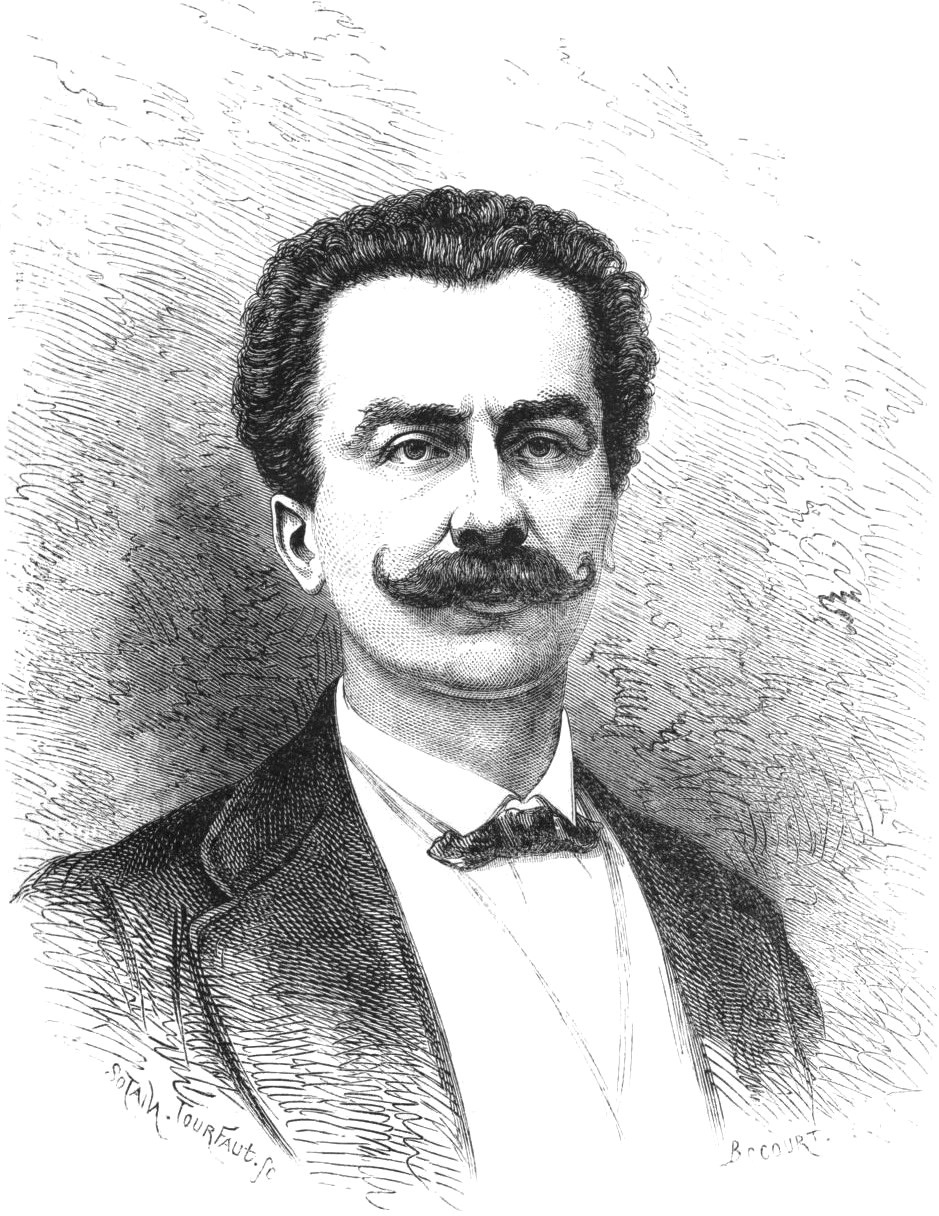
François-Frédéric Steenackers.

Landing at La Ferté-Bernard in a "free" sector at dawn on December 7, they moved on to Le Mans and then Tours on December 8, 1870, where they met François-Frédéric Steenackers, Director General of Telegraphs, who was also in charge of the Post for the province, as he had followed the Government of National Defense in its retreat. Steenackers congratulated them on their initiative and confirmed that, as agreed with Rampont, the mail was to be centralized in Clermont-Ferrand. Buoyed by this encouragement, Delort and Robert set off as quickly as possible for Clermont-Ferrand, via Bordeaux, where they met Steenackers' deputy on December 9. This complicated route was the only way to reach the Puy-de-Dôme by rail from Tours. It was during their stopover in Gironde that they published a press release announcing the setting up of this special service, presenting themselves as private operators ("Free post") acting with the agreement of the Post administration; the release also specified that the three men would be paid directly by users. (Note: Mail should be addressed to Robert, accompanied by a postal money order at 1.20 for postage and payment to the three men —Delort 1871, p. 16.)

==== Second contract, with François-Frédéric Steenackers ====
On December 15, 1870, after they had been at work for two days and had begun collecting mail, they received an injunction from Steenackers to cease all publicity, suspend the operation and return the letters in their possession; they were accused of an adventurous operation which, moreover, contravened the postal services' monopoly on mail distribution. After a meeting with the imperial prosecutor in Clermont-Ferrand, Delort and Robert immediately returned to Bordeaux, where the government had taken up residence. There, after long and tense discussions, new conditions were imposed on December 24, 1870, which were financially less advantageous for them, but more precise and more in line with the Post statutes; the letter collection point was also transferred to Moulins, closer to the Seine. In addition to these practical and financial reasons, the underlying reasons for this about-turn are not well known, but the administration's desire to limit its liability in the event of malfunctioning, while at the same time "regaining control" of the operation, was undoubtedly a factor. The notorious enmity and rivalry between Rampont and Steenackers undoubtedly played a part, with the latter suspected of deliberately obstructing an operation approved by the former.

=== Operational stage ===
==== Practical arrangements ====
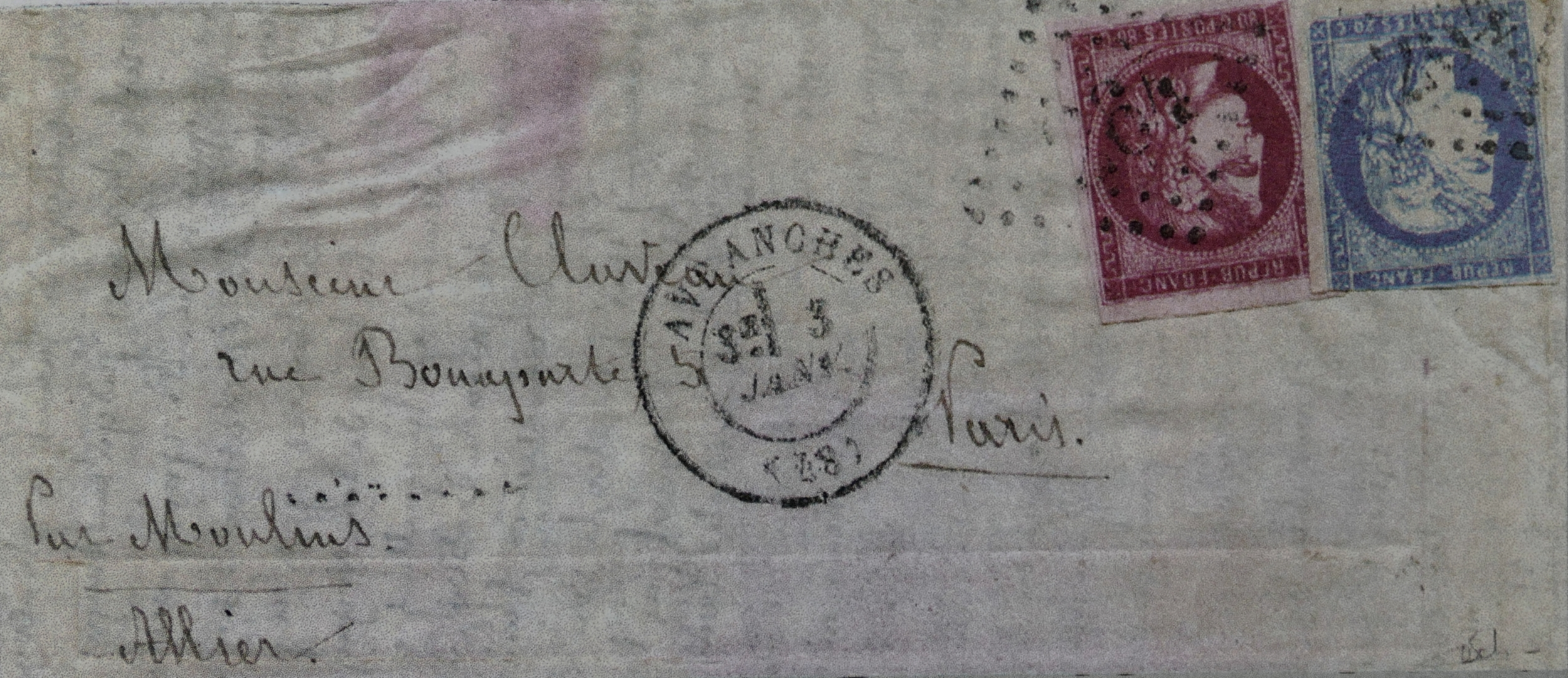
Ball letter from Moulins stamped at the 1 franc rate, registered in Avranches on January 3, 1871.

Under the terms of the contract imposed by Steenackers and the subject of a decree published in Le Moniteur universel on December 26, 1870, mail destined to enter Paris via the balls was grouped together at the central post office in Moulins, regardless of its place of dispatch, and had to be franked at 1 franc instead of the normal 20 centimes. The additional 80 centimes were intended to pay Delort, Robert and Vonoven (paid by the Post, half on registration of the mail in Moulins and half on actual receipt in Paris); however, no guarantee was promised to users by the administration, which disclaimed its responsibility in advance.

As some post offices were deprived of stamps during the war, some mail transported by ball post from Moulins did not include any on the envelope; instead, a P.P. ("port payé") stamp was affixed when the letter was registered, attesting that the sender had paid the cost of postage. Letters could have also been franked on departure, but had lost their stamps inside the ball while in the water, due to dampness; in this case, the same stamp was affixed, but this time on arrival, so that the letter would not be taxed.

In order not to arouse the enemy's attention, the letters are not marked with any special stamp; only the recipient's address must bear the words "Paris, par Moulins (Allier)". (Note: Many people, both in France and abroad, thought that all they had to do was write "Paris par Moulins" on an envelope franked at the normal rate, and their mail would be forwarded. In the absence of the specific 1 franking, these letters were not taken up.—"Académie des sciences". Journal officiel de la République française (in French). 1871 [November 24, 1871].)

==== Mail route from Moulins to Paris ====
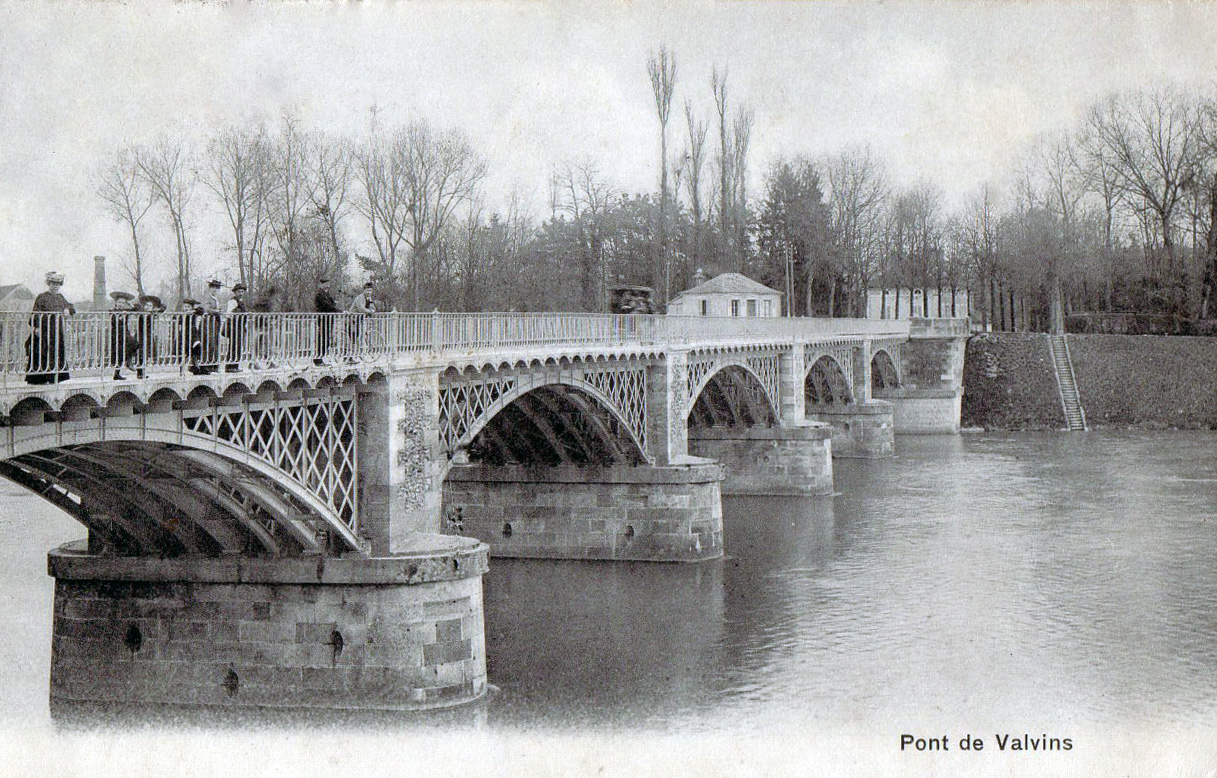
The old Valvins bridge at Samois-sur-Seine, one of the immersion sites for the Boules de Moulins.

Delort stayed in Moulins to pack the balls - those brought from Paris were too few in number, so others were made in Lyon by a craftsman -, fill in the slips detailing their contents, and supervise their transport to Cosne-sur-Loire, where they were stored.

Robert, dressed as a farmer driving a straw cart or as a poultry and egg merchant, transported the "agents" - the term used to designate the balls from the very first discussions with Rampont - from Cosne to the banks of the Seine. He immersed them upstream of Paris, from Bray-sur-Seine to Samois-sur-Seine, from a boat or a bridge. On its route, it also provided office-to-office postal service where it was interrupted.

A 280 m wide net, stretched behind the enemy lines at the Port à l'Anglais in Alfortville, was to stop the balls being directed into a funnel. Vonoven, who remained in Paris, took charge of raising it morning and evening with the help of postal workers provided by Rampont, but, unaware of the lengthy discussions taking place in the provinces and the resulting delays, he began this surveillance work shortly after Delort and Robert left Paris, probably around December 15.

Fifty-five balls were finally thrown into the Seine between January 5, 1871 (the first letters and the last instructions did not reach Moulins until January 4, 1871) and the 28th of the same month, despite the fact that several days before the latter date, the Post Office administration had asked that no more mail be sent to Moulins, as it was not certain that the operation would be a success. The number of letters transported by the Moulins balls is estimated at between 35,000 and 40,000.

== Results ==
=== Statement of failure ===
Although the tests were successful, the system proved totally ineffective in practice. None of the balls sent out were recovered during the siege; they were probably silted up, stopped by obstacles or passed through the torn net, whose anchoring points were torn off by the ice carried by the Seine on January 22; Vonoven managed to repair the device (making and fixing a new net) on January 28, but the operation was already coming to an end.

On February 10, 14,600 unopened letters were discovered at the Moulins post office: these were most likely letters that the Moulins postmaster had been instructed not to entrust to Delort in the last days of January 1871; the letters were forwarded to Paris, where they arrived two days later, concealed in sacks of rice intended to supply Parisians, hence the name "bags of rice" given to the letters. (Note: On this date, the Franco-German Armistice (1871) was signed, but one of its provisions stipulated that mail entering Paris should not be sealed. The letters found in Moulins, ready to be packed in balls, did not comply with this requirement: they had to travel clandestinely—Emmeneger 2018, p. 429Michaud, Melot & Sinais 1996, p. 9.) Ready-made balls were found in Cosne, and the letters they contained arrived by road in Paris between February 17 and 22, after the Prussians had authorized the normal restoration of postal services; these envelopes were nicknamed "letters from Cosne".

Delays in negotiations were certainly a factor in the project's failure: as the days went by and winter set in, the Seine's current slowed down with its partial ice jam, and the first balls were not immersed until January 5, 1871, when the operation could have started at least a fortnight earlier; Delort, in an open letter to General Trochu, blamed Steenackers for the delays and hence the failure. After the war, the designers, whose remuneration clauses had not been respected by the Post administration, took action against the State to obtain financial compensation, going so far as to write to Marshal Patrice de Mac Mahon, but without success; Delort and Robert were only entitled to a commemorative medal for their balloon trip out of Paris.

=== Subsequent repechage ===
Moulins balls course. Ball immersion locations Collecting net Known draft locations

Between 25 and 30 balls were recovered, but after the end of the siege, they were washed up on the banks, brought up from the bottom by machines, or found during bridge maintenance. The first was fished out in March 1871 at Les Andelys; the majority of finds took place up to 1910, (Note: The 1910 Great Flood of Paris most likely freed two balls from the obstacles holding them back—Grain & Sausse 2011, p. 5.) including ten from 1871, but one ball was found in 1942, another in 1952. More recently, a ball was hauled up by a dredger operator at Saint-Wandrille (Seine-Maritime) on August 8, 1968. Another ball was recovered at Vatteville-la-Rue (Seine-Maritime) in 1982, followed by another in 1988. Until 1982, the postal administration sought to return the letters to the descendants of the original addressees. From then on, the balls and their contents became part of the national heritage.

Of the 55 balls that were made, around twenty are still theoretically stuck at the bottom of the Seine and could still be found. However, from this number, an unknown number of balls must be removed, whose recovery was carried out discreetly and whose contents were directly offered for sale on the collectors' market. Even if some balls were recovered almost where they had been immersed, the location of the latest finds (downstream from Rouen) suggests that the undiscovered balls may have travelled a considerable distance from Paris, or even to the English Channel. After the end of the 1870 war, a salvage operation was even declared in Saint-Malo: (Note: Germain Rampont, Director of the Post Office in Paris from 1870 to 1873, states that a ball recovered in Saint-Malo (but he doesn't specify under what conditions) was brought back to Paris after the war, containing 613 letters delivered to their addressees—Michaud, Melot & Sinais 1996, p. 9.) for this to happen, sea currents would have had to allow the ball to bypass the entire Cotentin peninsula, which may seem surprising; it is also possible that a fisherman trawled it near the mouth of the Seine, only to throw it back into the water not far from his home port of Saint-Malo.

== Philatelic interest ==
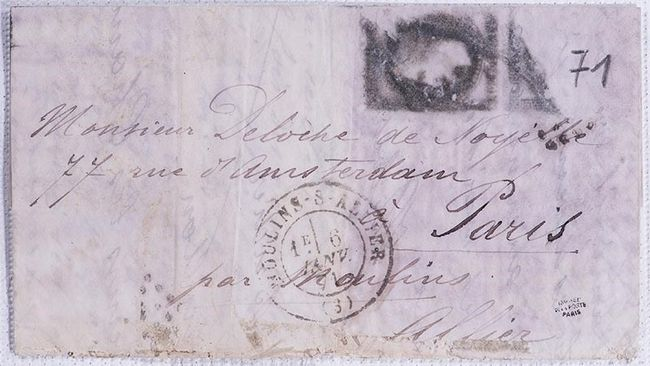
Mail having traveled by ball from Moulins (salvaged from Vateville-la-Rue, 1982).

In addition to their historical interest, letters that have passed through the " Moulins Balls", also called "Moulins Balls" by extension, and to a lesser extent " Rice Bags" or " Letters from Cosne" have a very high value on the philatelic market.

In the best conditions of preservation, when the authenticity of the letter could be proven and when it had arrived in Paris, "the postmark being proof", the value of Moulins balls reached up to 200,000 F in 1996. During the 1968 salvage operation at Saint-Wandrille, the French Post Office decided to affix an official stamp to the back of the letters recovered from the balls, authenticating them. To avoid any risk of fraud, the stamps bearing this stamp were destroyed after use.

In three cases, proof was provided that a letter dispatched from Paris to the provinces by mounted balloon had received a direct reply by Moulins Balls. These "pairs" of letters constitute philatelic documents and rare evidence of how the Post Office operated in times of siege.

== Iconography ==
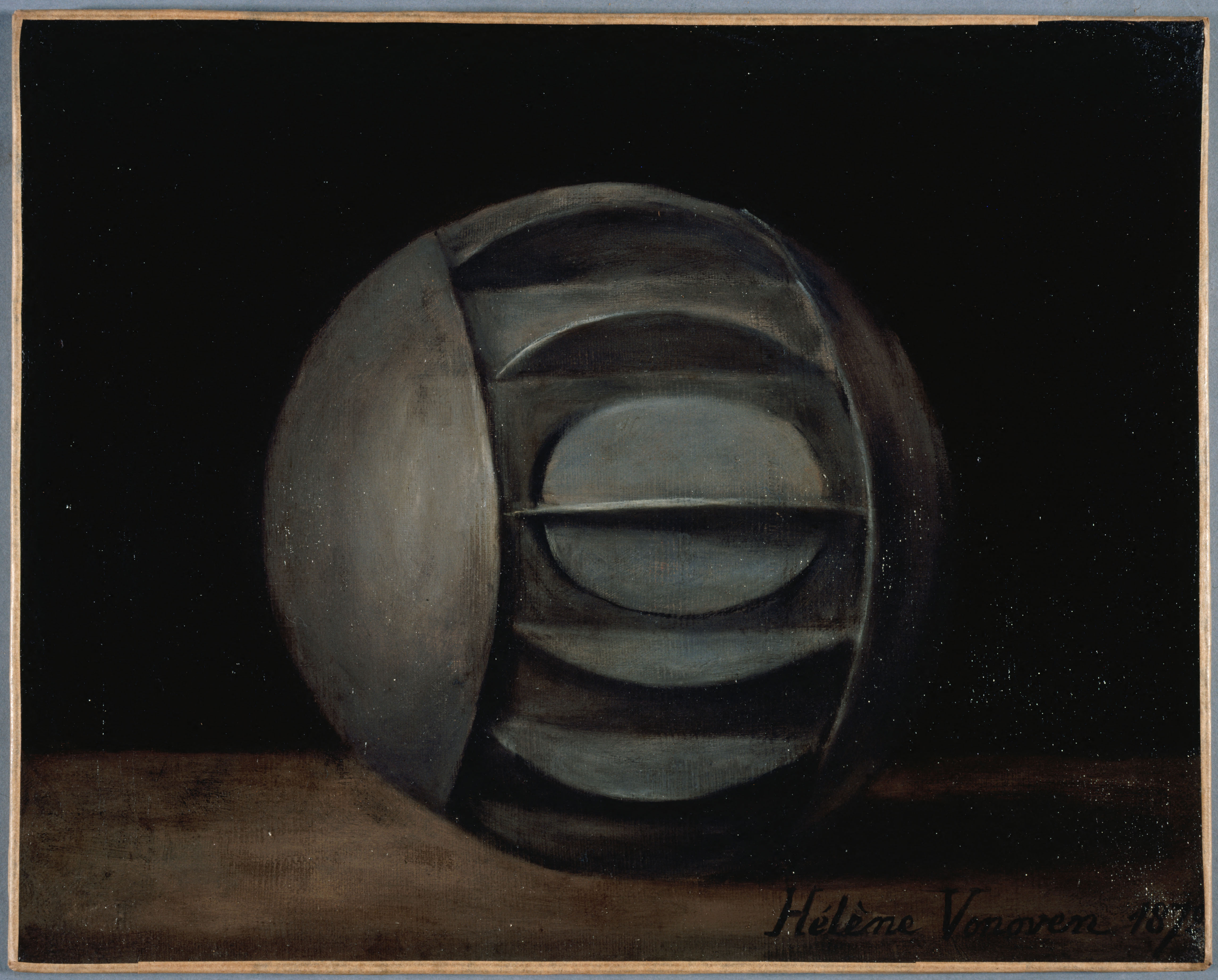
Painting by Hélène Vonoven.

An oil on canvas, dated and signed in 1872 by Hélène Vononen (daughter of Isca Vonoven, born in 1853), depicting a Moulins Ball, is on display at the Musée Carnavalet in Paris (donated by Mr. Vonoven in 1899).

As part of the 1979 Europa issue devoted to postal history, France issued a postage stamp with a face value of 1.70 francs to commemorate the Boule de Moulins experiment.

== See also ==
- Balloon mail

== Bibliography ==
Documents used as a source for this article:

- "Les Boules de Moulins". Bulletin de l'Association internationale d'histoire postale de la guerre de 1870/1871 (in French) (2). 1995.
- Robert Boussac (1988). Boules de Moulins: supplément au numéro 253 des Feuilles marcophiles (in French). Union marcophile. ISSN 0755-8945.
- Paul Charbon; et al. (1996). Le Patrimoine de La Poste (in French). Charenton-le-Pont: éditions Flohic. ISBN 978-2-8423-4008-7.
- Delort, Pierre-Charles (1871). Lettre à M. le général Trochu, ancien gouverneur de Paris sur la mission confiée par le Gouvernement de la défense nationale à MM. P. Delort, E. Robert, J. Vonoven pour le service des dépêches pour Paris : Siège de Paris (in French). Paris.
- Emmeneger, Jean-Louis (2018). "Les boules de Moulins" (PDF). Journal philatélique suisse-SBZ (in French and German): 426–431.
- Grain, Pierre; Sausse, Alain (2011). "Ballons montés et boules de Moulins" (PDF). Le Monde de la technologie (154): 1–6.
- Gérard Lhéritier (1992). Les ballons montés, boules de Moulins, pigeongrammes, papillons de Metz (in French). Valeur philatélique. ISBN 978-2-9084-4101-7.
- Michaud, Didier; Melot, Michel; Sinais, Bertrand (1996). "Nom de code : Paris par Moulins : l'épopée du courrier par boules subaquatiques". Timbres Magazine (in French) (134): 4–10.
- Sinais, Bertrand (1999). "Des agents très spéciaux". Brochure Philexfrance 99 (in French) (2): 66–71.
