= Eugène Farcot =

French clockmaker, industrialist, inventor, mechanical engineer, aeronaut and writer

Henri-Eugène-Adrien Farcot
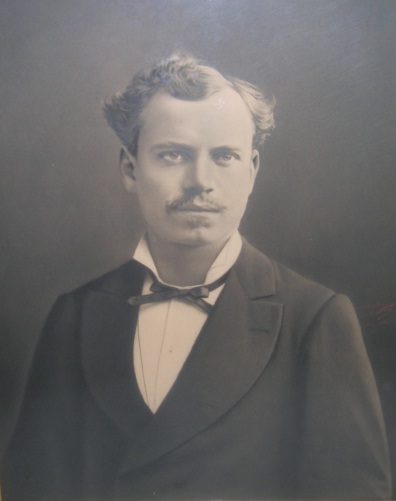
- The horologist in his youth
- Born: 20 February 1830; Sainville, France
- Died: 14 March 1896 (aged 66); Saint-Maur-des-Fossés, France
- Occupation: Horologist
- Known for: Conical pendulum clocks
- Spouse: Pauline Le Blond (1836–1899)
- Children: Marguerite Farcot (1858–1890) Charles-Louis-Eugène Farcot (1860–1881)
- Parent(s): Louis François Désiré Farcot and Emelie Delafoy
- Awards: Bronze medal, Besançon 1860 International Exposition; Honorable mention, London 1862 International Exhibition; Bronze medal, Paris 1863 Exposition des Beaux-arts appliqués à l'industrie; Bronze medal, Paris 1867 International Exposition; Silver medal, Paris 1878 International Exposition

Henri-Eugène-Adrien Farcot (20 February 1830 in Sainville – 14 March 1896 in Saint-Maur-des-Fossés) was a French clockmaker, industrialist, inventor, mechanical engineer, aeronaut, writer, and one of the most celebrated makers of conical pendulum clocks.

== Career ==
In 1853, he established the Manufacture d'horlogerie E. Farcot with headquarters, from 1855 (previously in Rue Vieille du Temple, 75, Paris), on Rue des Trois-Bornes, 39, Paris, wherein he worked until his retirement in the late 1880s, succeeded by his son-in-law the Belgian Henri-Charles Wandenberg, or Vandenberg, until December 1903 and Paul Grenon (Wandenberg's nephew) until 1914. Between October 1855 and March 1856 the company's name changed to Farcot et Cie, and in 1887 it was renamed Farcot et Wandenberg, although the partnership was officially constituted in April 1890.

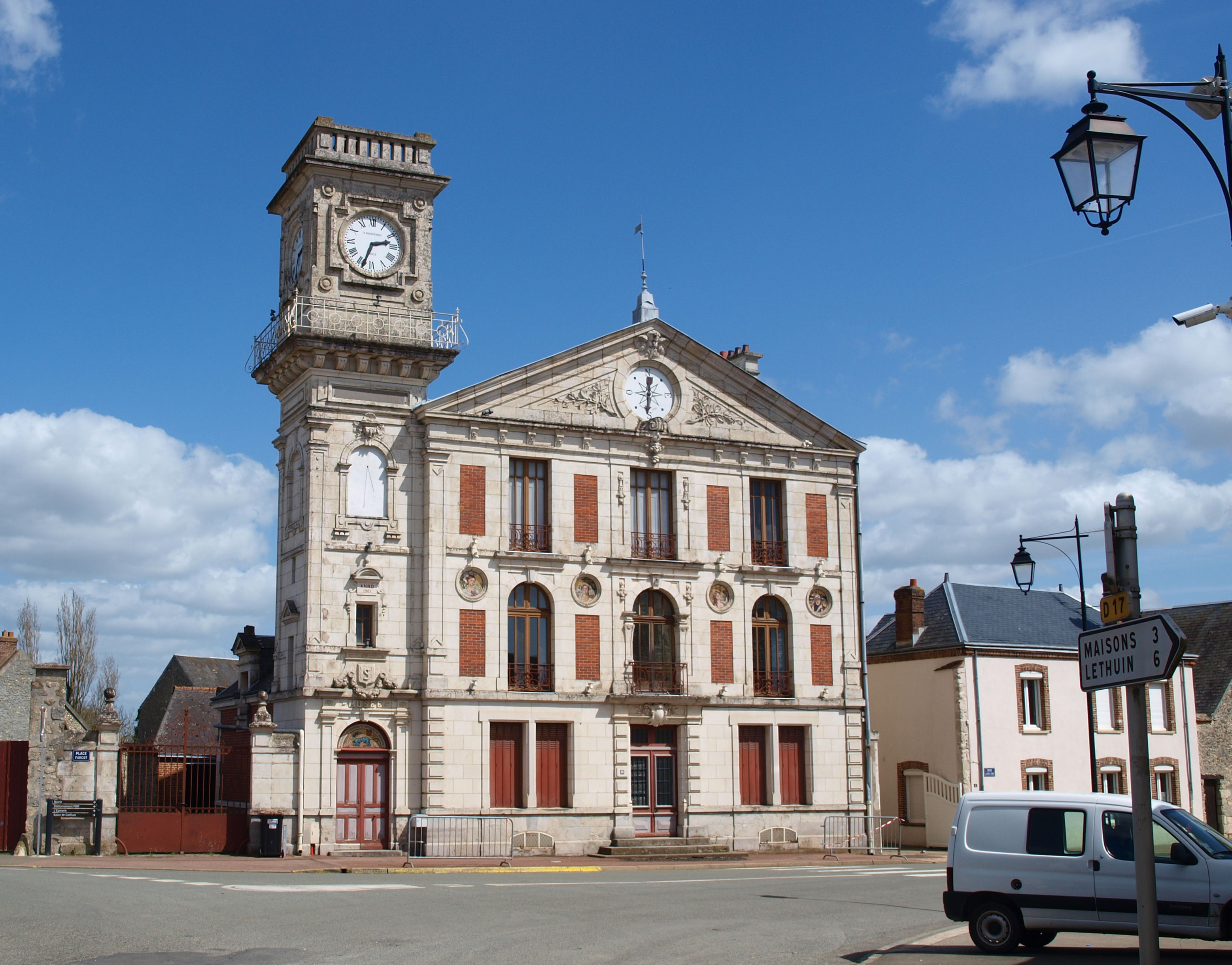
Farcot museum in Sainville.

Throughout his career, Farcot earned an honorable mention and four medals at the following expositions: Besançon 1860 (bronze), London 1862 (honorable mention), Paris (1863 bronze, 1867 bronze & 1878 silver), as well as did Henri Wandenberg, both with a silver medal in Paris 1889 and a gold medal in Paris 1900.

In addition to clockmaking, Farcot was a member of the Société aérostatique et météorologique de France and the defunct Chambre syndicale d'horlogerie de Paris. The Musée Farcot in Sainville showcases his life, travels, and work.

== Patents ==
Of the nineteen patents registered to his name between 1855 and 1886, sixteen are linked to horology. In chronological order, they are:

- 22637, 03/03/1855 – Mouvement de pendule
- 37159, 23/06/1858 – Perfectionnements apportés à l'horlogerie
- 41812, 11/08/1859 – Perfectionnements apportés à l'horlogerie
- 44007, 23/02/1860 – Perfectionnements apportés à l'horlogerie
- 50962, 24/08/1861 – Réveille-matin avertisseur
- 53502, 25/03/1862 – Perfectionnements apportés à l'horlogerie
- 65992, 26/01/1865 – Perfectionnements aux réveille-matin
- 84057, 20/01/1869 – Timbre d'appel, avertisseur mobile de porte, et sonnerie télégraphique simplifiée
- 89384, 31/03/1870 – Réveil horizontal à marche rotative et silencieuse
- 89455, 26/03/1870 – Perfectionnements apportés et appliqués spécialement dans la fabrication des réveille-matin
- 92460, 14/08/1871 – Pendule de nuit
- 101995, 29/01/1874 – Perfectionnement et transformation dans la fermeture des porte-monnaie à cadre, pouvant s'appliquer à tous objets de fantaisie, tels que porte-cigares, cigarettes, carnets, bonbonnières, etc.
- 102593, 14/03/1874 – Perfectionnements apportés aux pendules de nuit lumineuses
- 107030, 01/03/1875 – Système de pendule-écusson applique, à remontoir auxiliaire et à tirage rentrant
- 166518, 10/08/1875 – Device for winding clocks (US patent of 107030)
- 167502, 07/03/1885 – Système de pendule à indications diurnes et nocturnes
- 176982, 24/06/1886 – Pendule courtoise
- 177703, 31/07/1886 – Réveil courtois
- 252398, 12/12/1895 – Application du phonographe aux pièces d'horlogerie (registered to the name of the Société Farcot et Wandenberg)

Files for each patent, including a description and drawings, can be consulted in the archives of the Institut national de la propriété industrielle (INPI).

== Monumental conical pendulum clock series ==
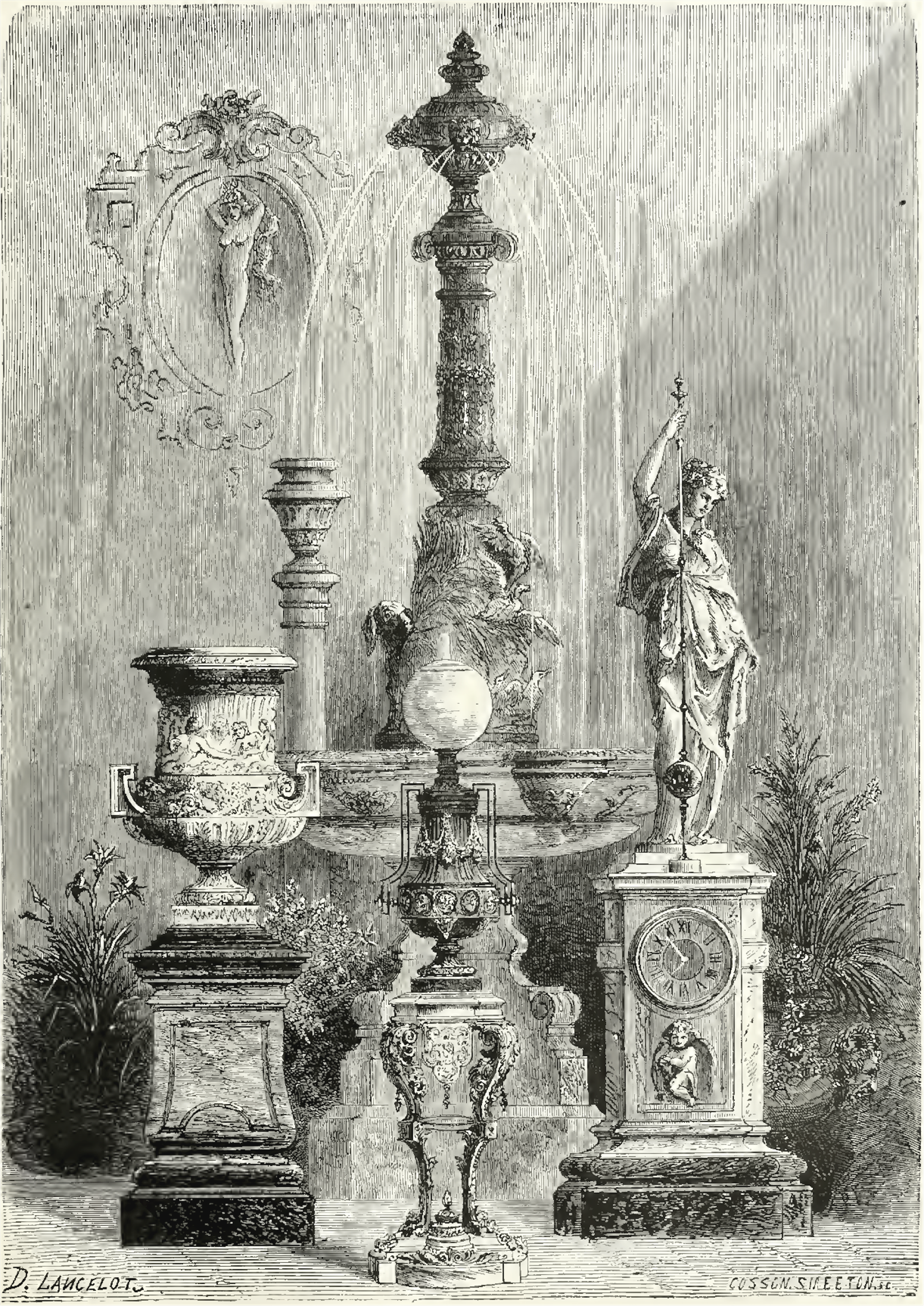
Clock stand of the Société des Marbres Onyx d'Algérie during the 1867 Paris world fair. This reputed, multi-awarded French firm provided the pedestal for the timepieces. Both the clock making company and the stone carver-supplier marketed the product. Drawing by D. Lancelot.

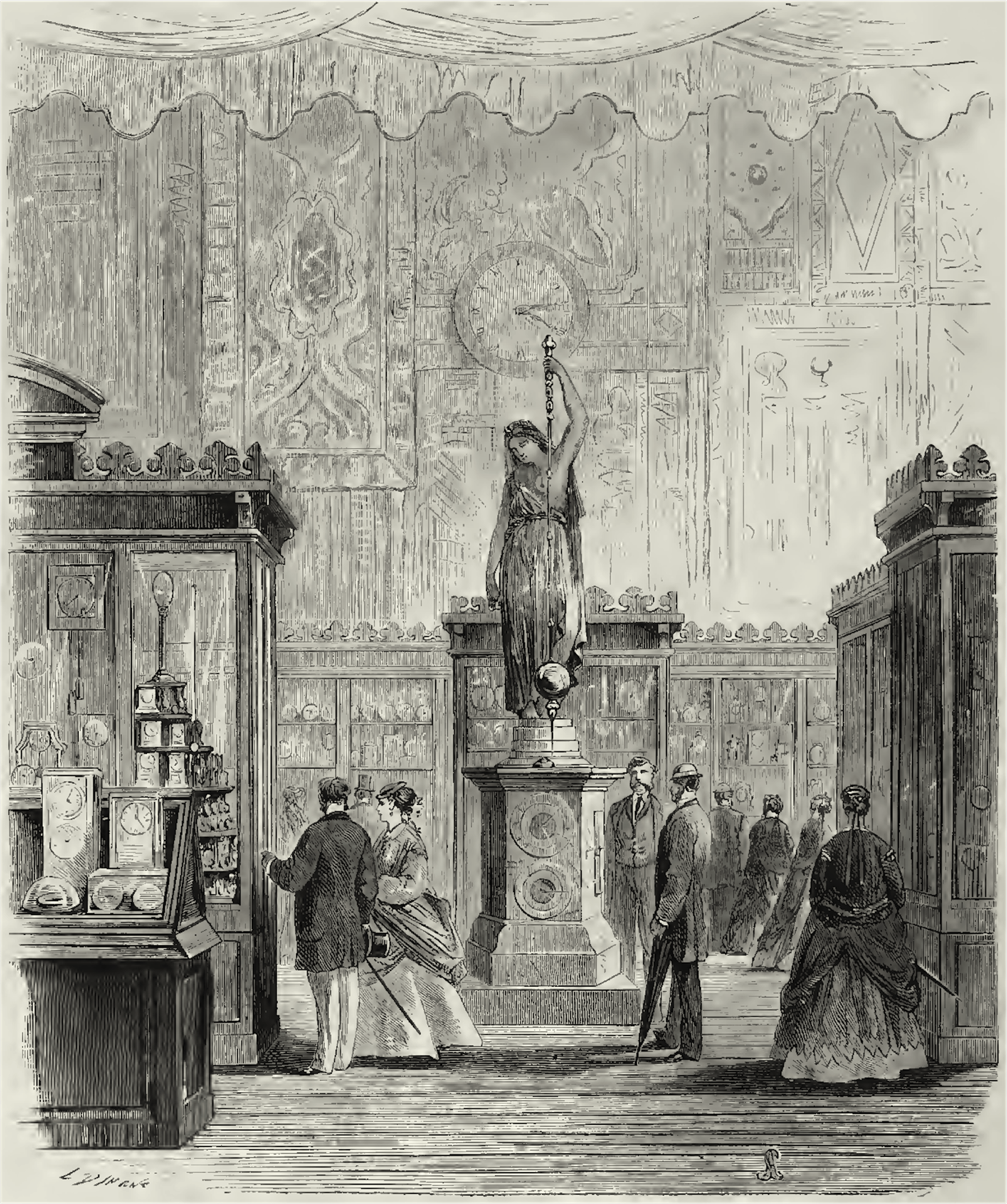
In the section devoted to the French horology at the 1867 Paris world fair is seen another version of the statue by Carrier-Belleuse. Drawing by Lamy.

A class of its own among the conical pendulum clocks are the monumental timepieces commercialized between 1862 and 1878. When this model debuted at the London International Exhibition of 1862, it was presented as the first application of the conical pendulum to statuary. In addition to the British capital, this clock was also displayed at the Paris Exposition des beaux-arts appliqués à l'industrie (1863), as well as in the major world's fairs held in Paris (1867 and 1878) and Philadelphia (1876).

In his own words, Eugène Farcot explained the origins of his idea during the 1867 Paris universal exposition (translated from the French):

Huygens suspended his conical pendulum from the rod itself, which gave it its rotation; an arrangement which has been advantageously employed as a regulator of steam machines, but which it is not possible to introduce in horology where, the latter has no more than a little force. Perhaps some wheels and pinions more than this clock needs have stopped the clock makers of the period when dentures were still made by hand It was almost forgotten in our days. [Note: It seems likely that 'dentures' is a mis-translation; 'teeth' is what is intended, and gear teeth, not dental ones.]

Mr. Foucault, by his experiment in the Panthéon, etc., brought it to mind, and it is to Mr. Balliman that we truly owe the first successful application to clocks. He exhibited a type in the show of 1855; a type which, as with all novelty, was joked about even by those who later appropriated the idea.

Afterwards, Mr. Redier came to the Besançon exposition, in 1860, with a conical pendulum regulator with horizontal motion, and he published a memoir on this topic in the same year.

These diverse works made me conceive the idea of applying the pendulum in question to decorative clock making, that is to say, the statues hold in their hand the pendulum whose silent operation and decorative effect should be suitable for bedrooms, salons, etc.

There remained its implementation, because it had to be created: caliber, suspension, fast-slow control, driving fork, etc. In 1862, I took to London the first specimens of its kind that took place in our industry since I first marketed it commercially.

Each mystery clock of this series was individually handcrafted. They were produced by artisans and scientists from multiple disciplines, utilizing techniques of Second Empire decorative arts.

Besides a remarkable precision in timekeeping, one of their most distinctive characteristics is the slow continual circular motion at a constant speed (instead of the conventional side to side swinging motion) of the noiseless pendulum, tracing a conical trajectory in space, hence its name.

=== List of clocks ===
The total number of clocks crafted is unknown; so far 13 have been found. It is unclear if the company used a separate serial number for its large-scale conical pendulum clocks, although probably no more than twenty were ever made. Those known are:

- No. 0 – Lambert Castle, New Jersey, USA. Purchased in 1869 for $10,000
- No. 8 – The Roosevelt New Orleans Hotel, New Orleans, USA
- No. 9 – Private collection, USA
- No. 16 – Drexel University, Pennsylvania, USA. Acquired in 1867 for $6,000
- No. 19 – National Watch and Clock Museum (NWCM), Pennsylvania, USA
- No. 23 – Private collection, USA
- No. 25 – Cliffe Castle Museum, Yorkshire, UK
- No. 28 – Cooper Hewitt, Smithsonian Design Museum, New York, USA
- No. 30 – Private collection, USA
- No. 44195 – Private collection, USA
- No serial number, Museo Cerralbo, Spain
- No serial number, The Dolder Grand Hotel, Switzerland
- The one depicted in the drawing by Lamy with two dials in the pedestal front, whereabouts unknown

=== Gallery ===
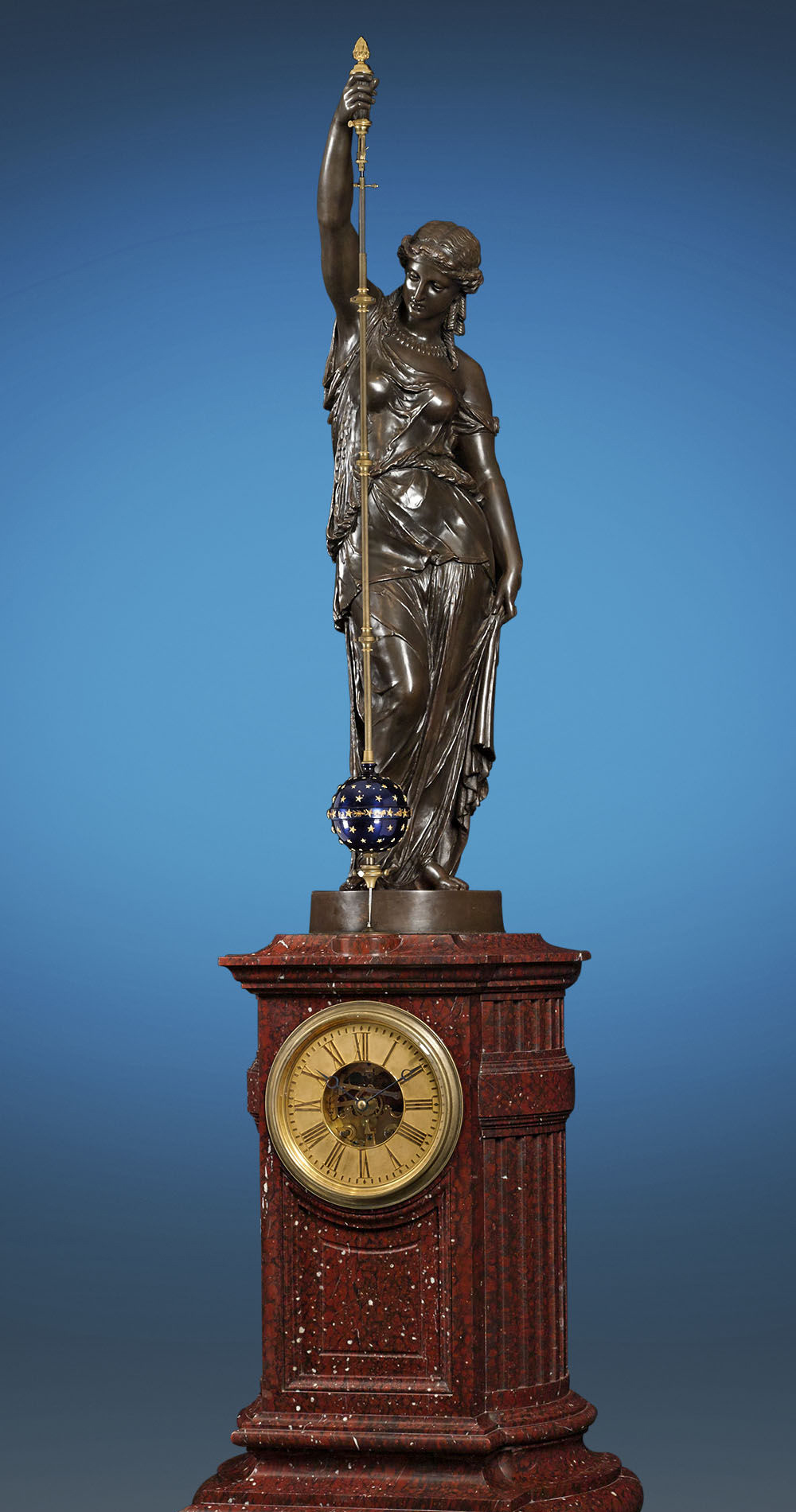
Serial number 23, exhibited at the London 1862 International Exhibition. The only one with a red griotte marble pedestal, rather than the costly Algerian onyx marble base all the other units originally came with.

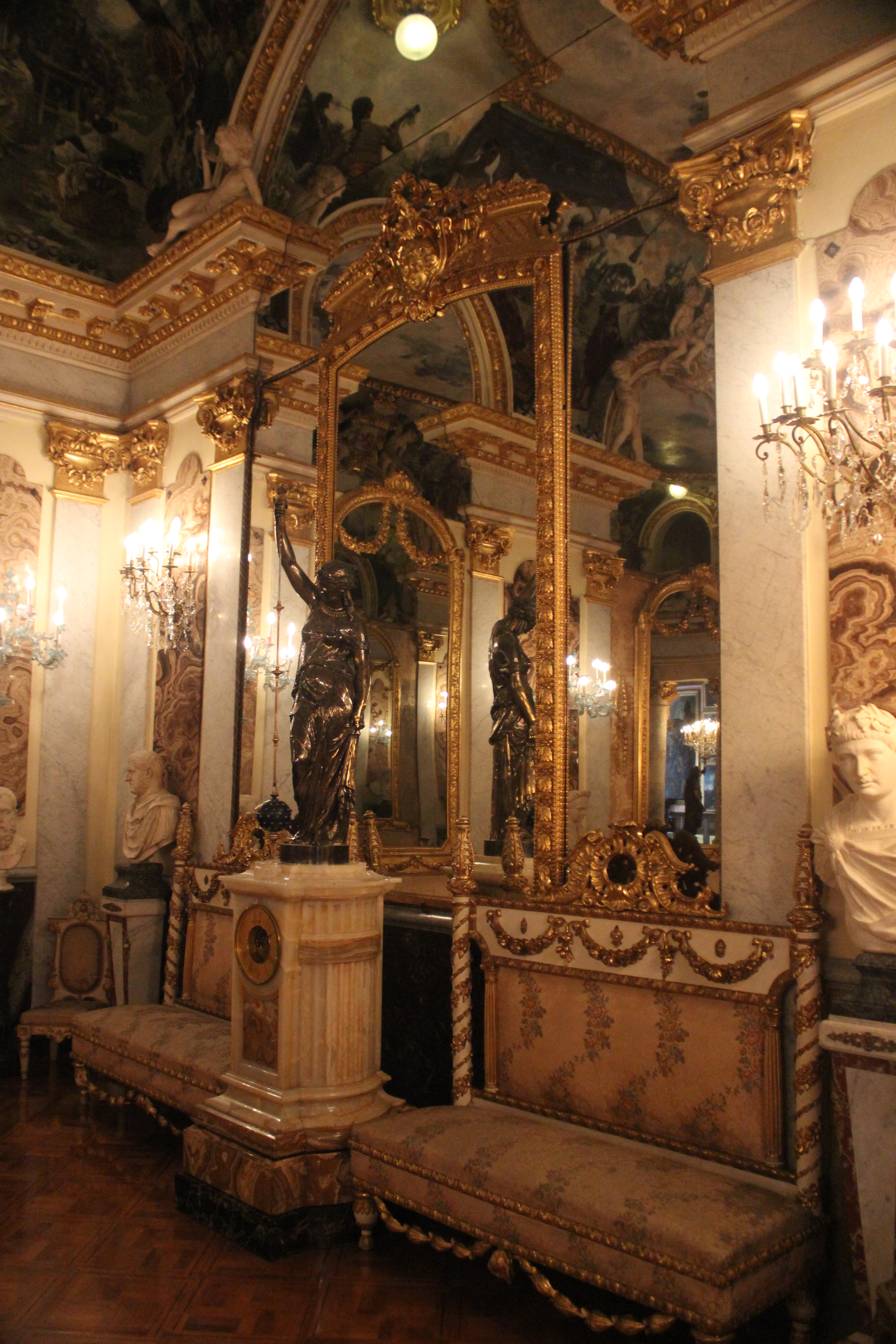
No serial number, Museo Cerralbo, circa 1863.

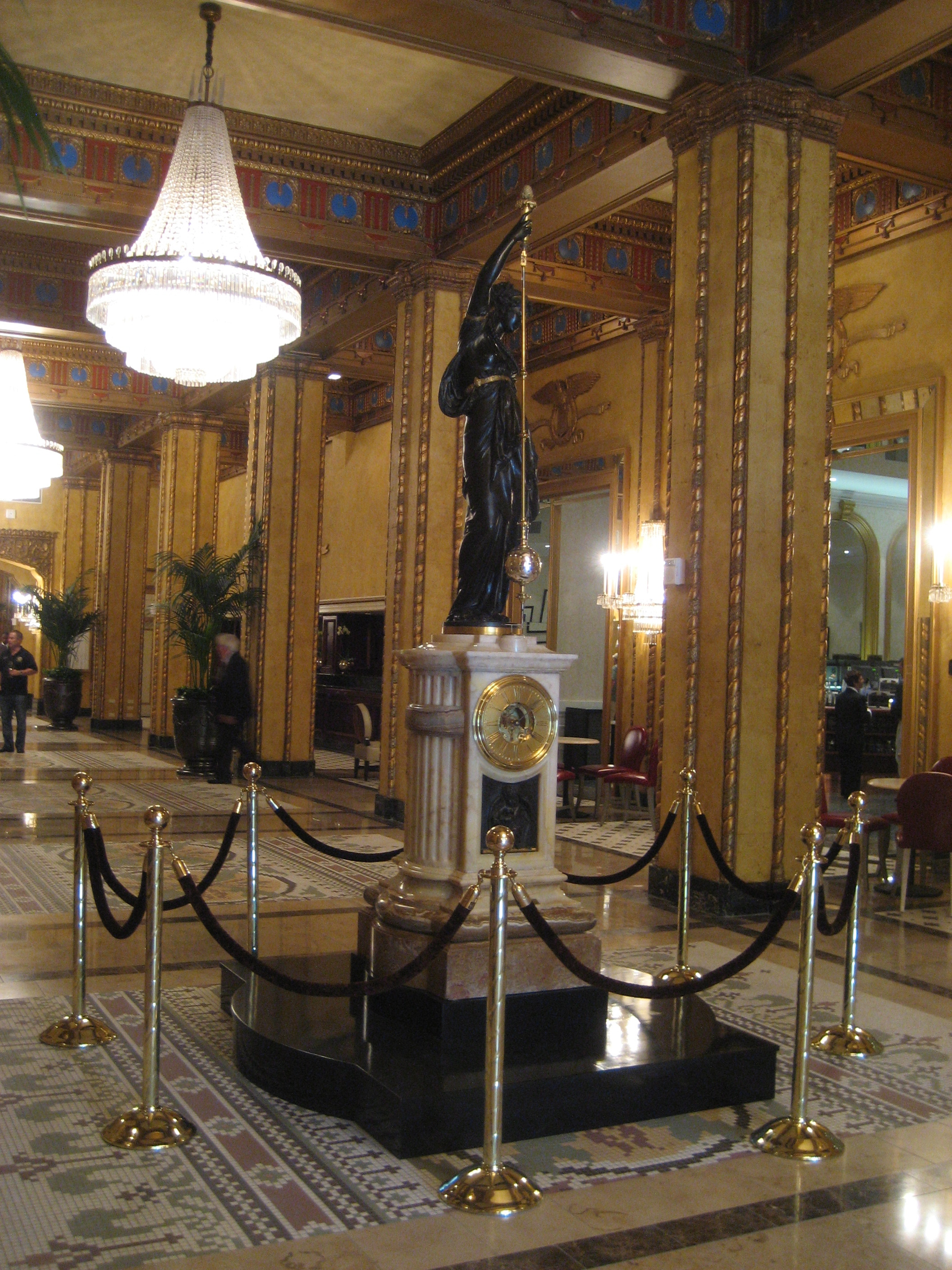
SN 8, exhibited at the Paris International Exposition (1867).

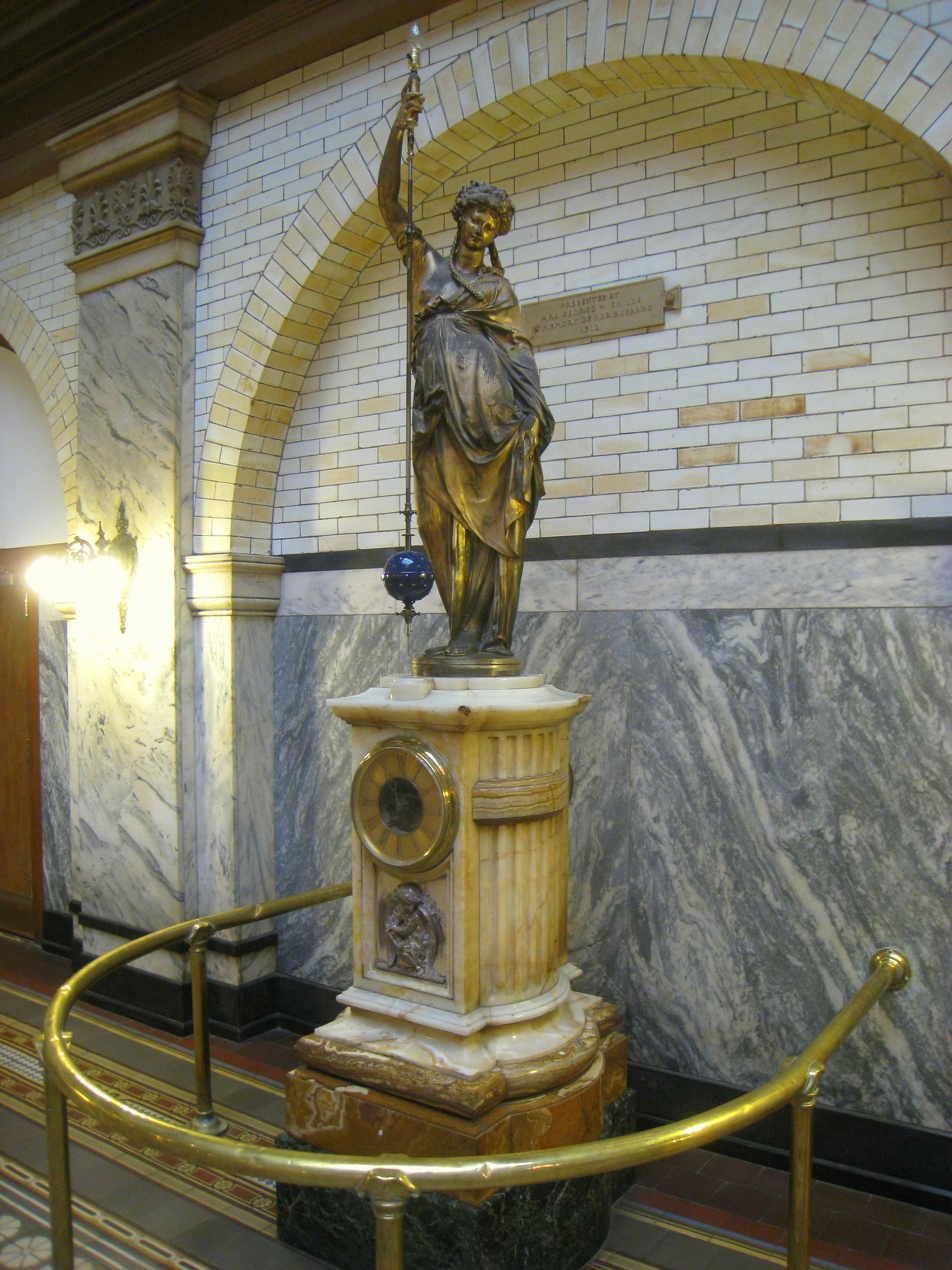
SN 16, exhibited at the Paris International Exposition (1867).

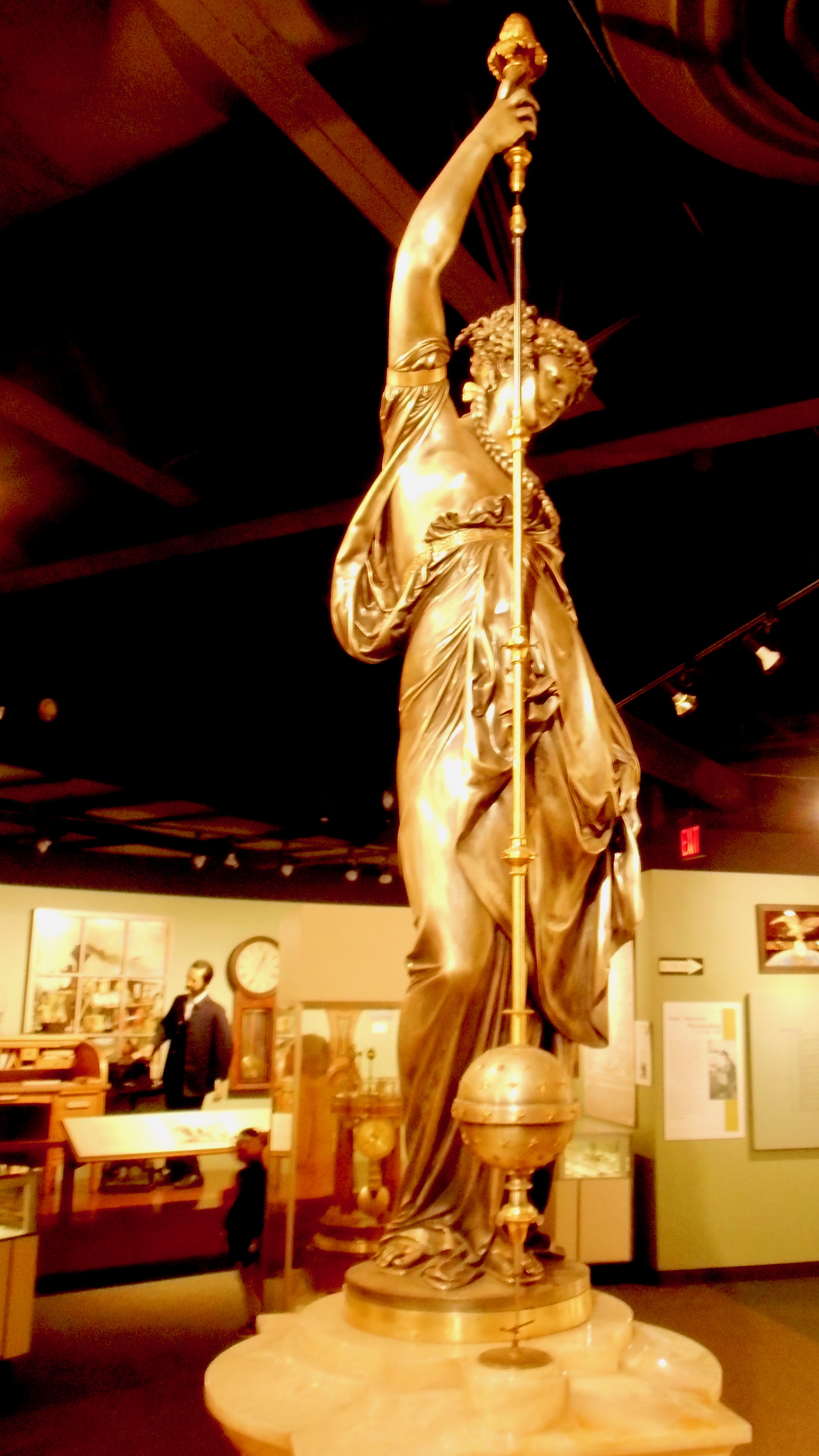
SN 19, exhibited at the Philadelphia Centennial Exposition (1876).

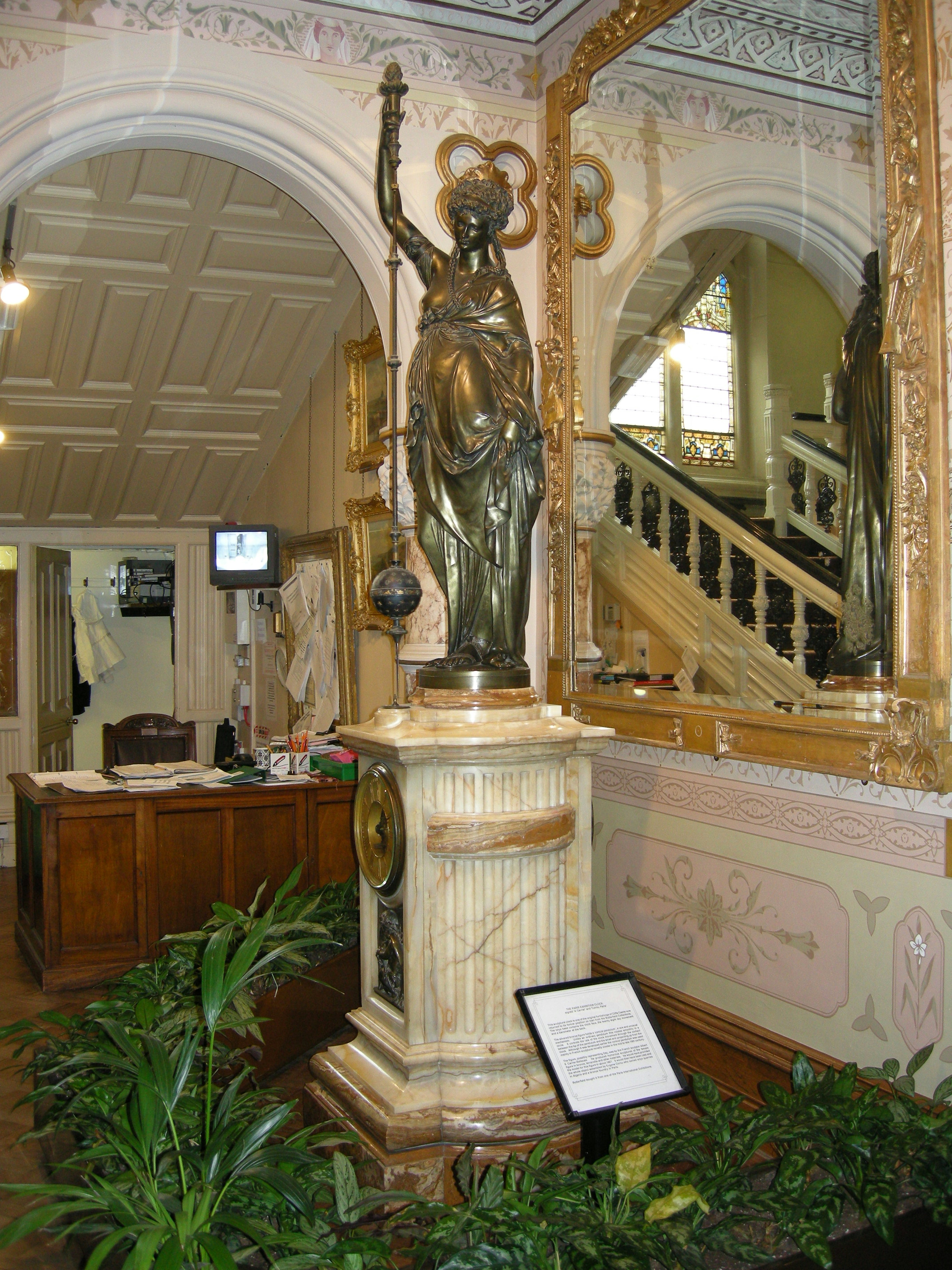
SN 25, exhibited at the Paris Exposition Universelle (1878).

== The largest conical pendulum clock ==
The piece at the Galerie d'Iéna, one of the main exhibition pavilions in the Palais du Champ-de-Mars at the Paris world fair of 1878.

The artefact epitomizes the alliance between art and industry promoted back then and also the golden age of the conical pendulum clock (second half of the 19th century).

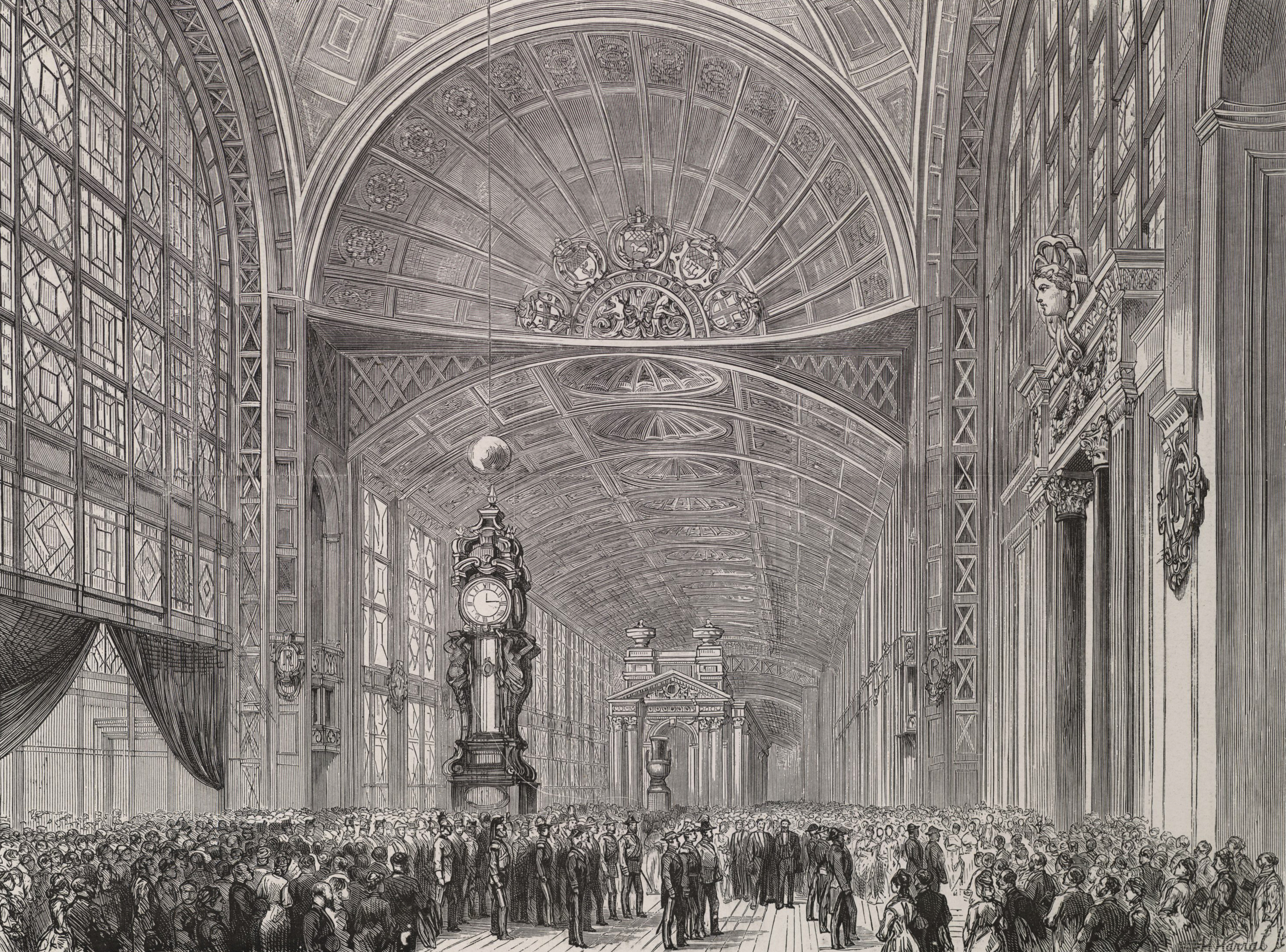
Drawing depicting the grand vestibule of the Galerie d'Iéna, both the clock and ceiling height have been magnified.

In 1878, the largest conical pendulum clock ever built was erected in the since-demolished Palais du Champ-de-Mars on the occasion of the Paris Exposition universelle internationale. It was Farcot's ultimate contribution to the conical pendulum clock, a type of timepiece not invented by the French, but that he brought to a new level of sophistication and engineering. Not to mention that he also helped to popularize it by offering affordable mantel models, some with a patent of invention.

The mechanical marvel was reviewed in several publications, next are included three of them:

Review 1: The largest pendulum in the Exhibition is the revolving one above the large clock made by Farcot. The pendulum [25 m long] is suspended from the roof [34 m high] of the building, performs six revolutions in a minute, and is made in conformity with Foucault's method. The large gilt ball which serves for the bob, about 2 feet in diameter, must be subject to considerable disturbance from the wind, for being just opposite the main entrance it is in a very draughty position.

Review 2: In the middle of the noble space under the entrance tower, stood the Monumental Clock, constructed by M. Eugène Farcot, immense in size, elaborate in design, and almost equalling as a wonder, though falling very far short in elaboration, the celebrated Clock of Strasbourg. It was of about twenty-two and a half feet in height, with four faces, rich though chaste in ornamentation; and the motion was communicated by a pendulum more than one hundred feet in length, suspended from the centre of the dome above, with a terrestrial globe of some four feet in diameter at the end, oscillating in about ten seconds, and acting upon a needle, invisible, like all the other mechanism. The lower portion had elaborate bas-reliefs in bronze with caryatides of the seasons at the corners; and it was surrounded, at a distance marking the limits of the central pavilion, by a circle of statues virtually forming a guard of honor for the central mechanical curiosity of the exhibition.

Review 3 (translated from the French): In the middle of the Palais du Champ-de-Mars vestibule of honor, beneath the grand central dome, a monumental clock, work of the skilled mechanical-horologist Mr. Eugène Farcot, attracts keen admiration.

This is a real monument, over 7 meters high, composed of a plinth ornamented with bas-reliefs representing the attributes of arts and industry, at each of whose four corners stand two-meter-high bronze caryatids supporting a pedimented turret. The clock sits in the center, with its four 1 meter 25 diameter dial faces.

As a pendulum, a 1 m. 25 diameter metallic ball, weighing around 100 kilograms, representing the earth, with its continents and islands emerging in gilt relief against a blue sea background. This globe, encircled by a gilt ring bearing, also in relief, the signs of the zodiac, is suspended from the center of the dome, 2 meters above the clock, connected to its invisible movement by a needle. This pendulum rotates, under its own weight, around a simulated sun at the centre of the circle it describes, which extends approximately 15 meters. It accomplishes this progression in 10 seconds.

The clock "runs by itself"; the spontaneous undulations of this enormous pendulum obey natural laws too well known to require explanation; however some visitors seemed very intrigued and very curious to know where was the "little beast" that moves the entire device. — They were, of course, a tiny minority.

== During the Siege of Paris ==
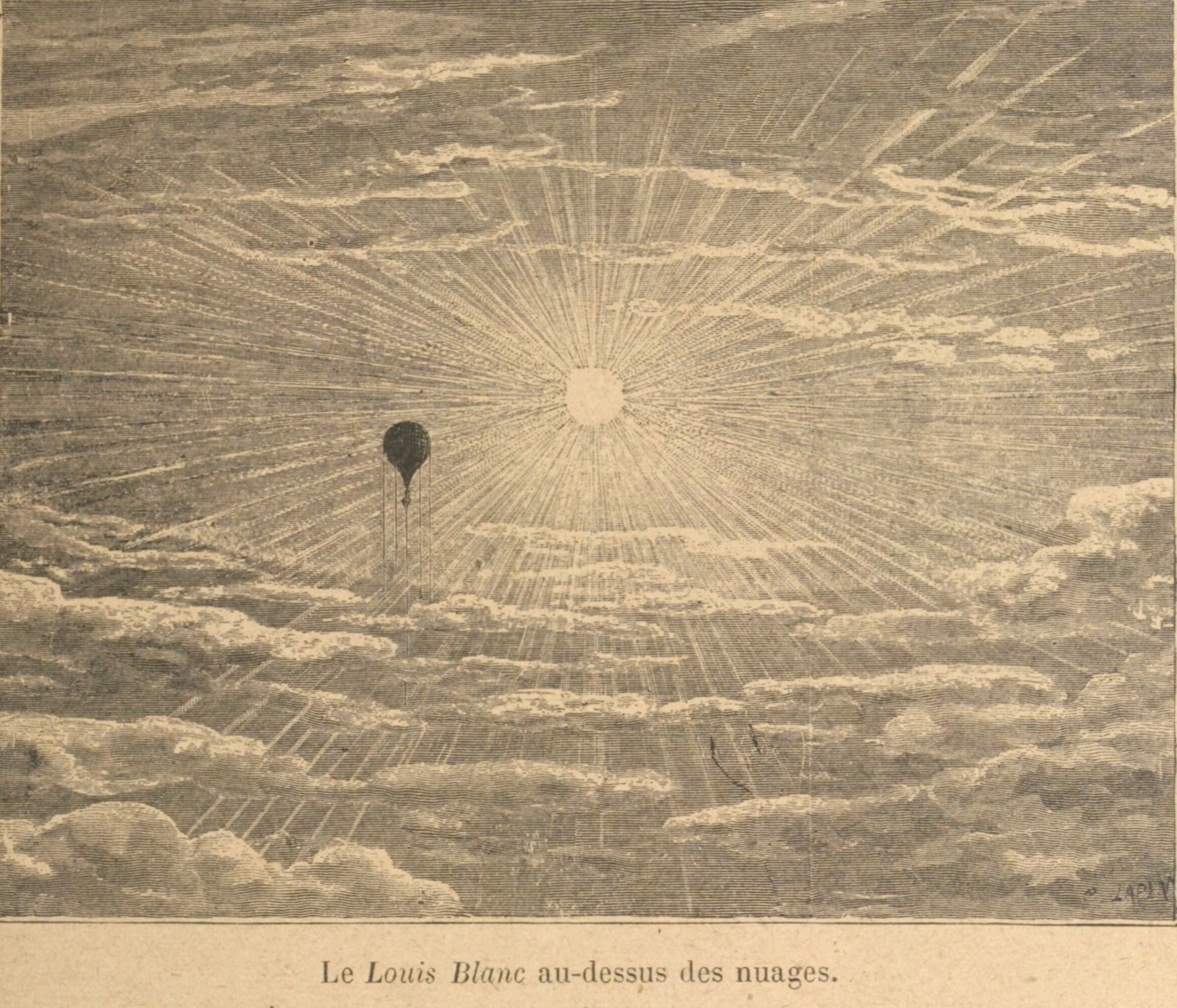
The Louis Blanc over the clouds.

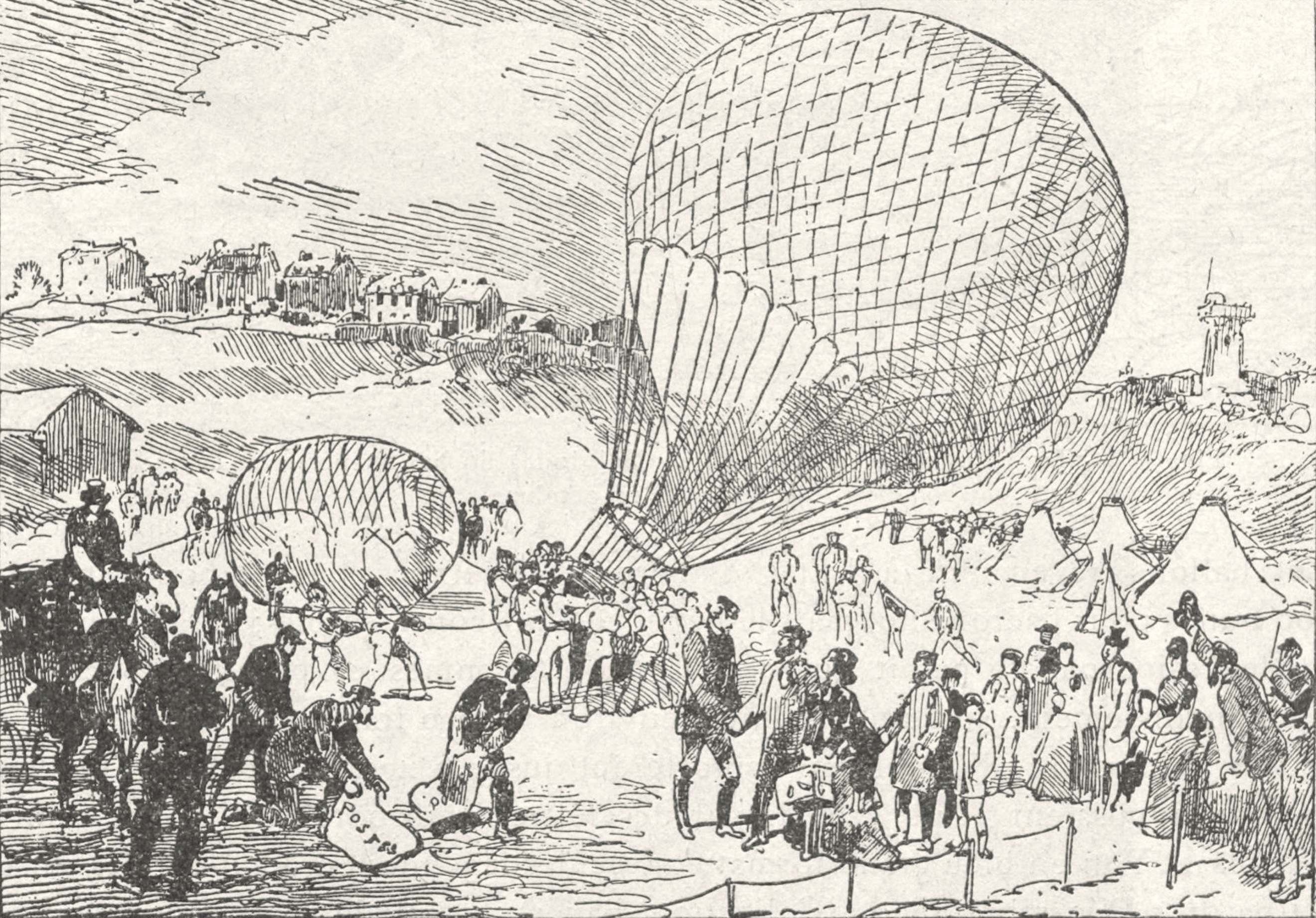
Nadar shakes Farcot's hand, before taking off at 9:00 am from the Place Saint-Pierre in Montmartre. The Louis Blanc was the 10th balloon mail of 66 sent during the siege.

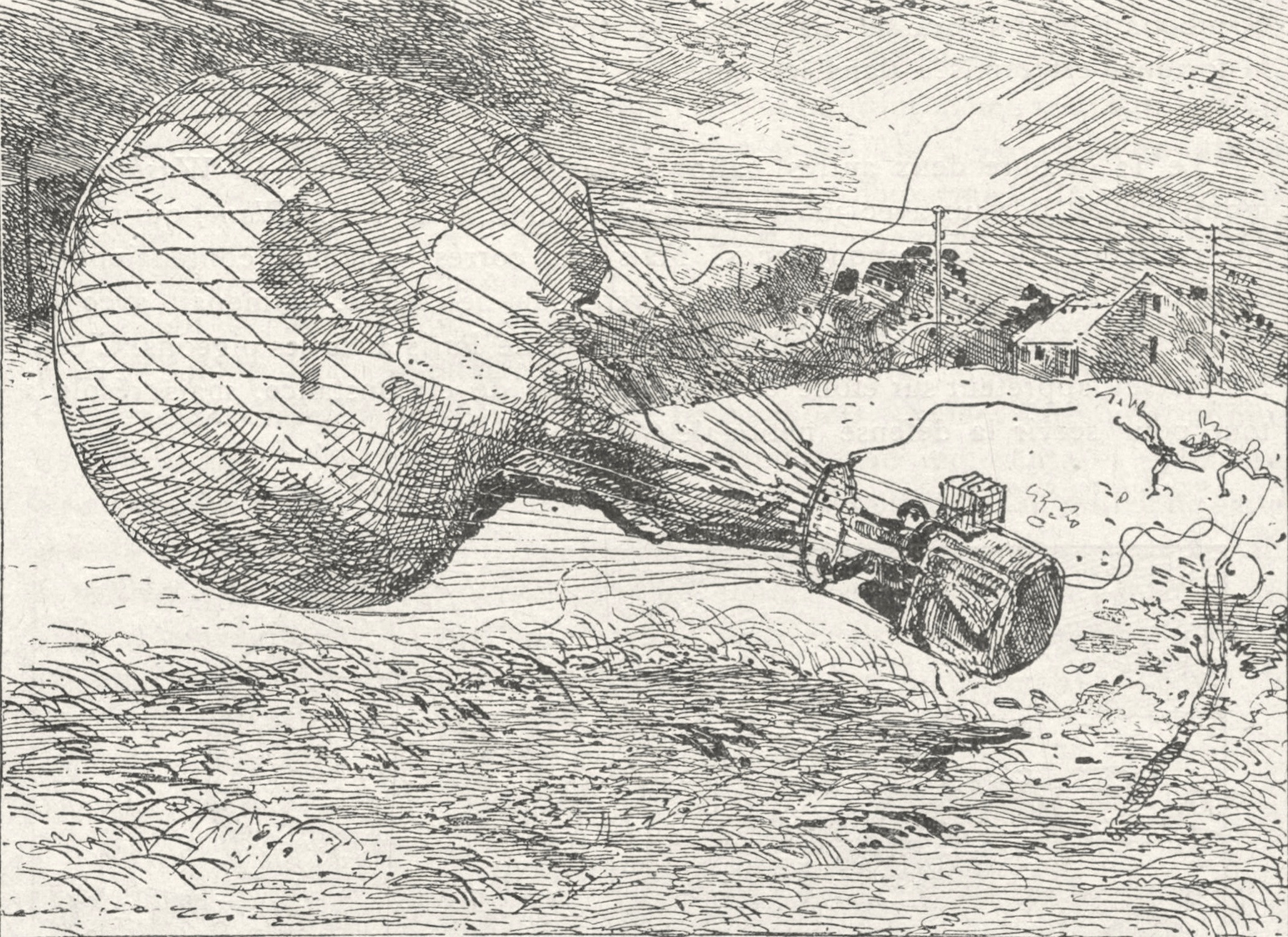
Farcot and Traclet suffered a turbulent, risky landing in Belgium.

While Farcot worked with a light engine built for him for aerostats, he caught his right thumb in the gears, and it had to be amputated, expressing later during the Franco-Prussian War [translated from the French]:

I could not properly handle a rifle.

This, however, did not impede him, during the Siege of Paris (1870–71), from leaving the city on 12 October 1870, piloting the ballon monté (balloon mail) Louis Blanc, overflying the siege and the Prussians shooting at it, in order to transport the mail, government dispatches, and eight carrier pigeons. He, and Auguste Traclet from the Association Colombophile de Paris, arrived in Béclers (Belgium) three hours later, becoming the first French aeronauts in Belgium.

Despite the balloon bearing his name, the politician Louis Blanc, who was present at the departure, refused to fly in the balloon when Wilfrid de Fonvielle asked him.

== Funereal discourse ==
Discourse pronounced before the tomb of the horologist by Paul Garnier, vice-president of the Chambre syndicale d'horlogerie de Paris [translated from the French]:

[...] Already twenty-four years ago that a certain number of people among us, still present here, but the number, alas! diminishes bit by bit, got together with a common goal to found a Chambre syndicale de l'Horlogerie.

Henri-Eugène-Adrien Farcot was one of these.

He was one of the first founding members of our Chamber.

His fame, the honorable place he occupied in our industry, the interest he showed in questions regarding our profession, made him soon to be appointed as a member of the 1st Board of our Chamber, where he sat for many years.

Those who, like me, were colleagues at that time, have still present in mind the memory of his cordiality, of his fair and clairvoyant spirit; I can say that his assistance was valuable for the debuts of our nascent Chamber rendering it real services.

But Farcot had a great concern about new and useful works. When our Chamber founded in 1880 a School of Horology, he particularly interested in it, and he did not spare neither in the encouragements nor in the wishes.

By his intelligence, his work, his perseverance, Farcot quickly gained in our profession a well-deserved reputation.

His many creations of all kind had and still have a huge success, not only in France but abroad.

All of them have the trace of his inventive and genius spirit and offer combinations as much ingenious as original.

Farcot also took much interest in aeronautics; the number of ascents in which he took part was considerable. He was not just a simple amateur.

Devoted patriot, he did not hesitate during the fatal and painful epoch of 1870, to make his services available at the Government of the Republic; he risked his life with abnegation to carry the provinces news from Paris besieged.

Tireless worker until the last moment, attached to his profession which he loved it, if death took him today, it is on the industrial battlefield, I can say that he dead at the field of honor.

If he has left us too early, if today we mourn on the edge of this opened tomb, he will have the consolation, in this supreme moment, of being surrounded by the affection of his own ones, of a devoted wife, worthy companion of his life's work, of a son-in-law cruelly tested himself, who was as a son to him and that he will not fail neither to honor his memory nor continuing his remembrance.

He leaves at the same time in his friends, in his colleagues, in his confreres, in his numerous workers a deep grieve and the memory of a nice and good man.

In this sad circumstance, we share the sorrow of his family and we mourn with them the man of kindness who is not longer.

In the name of my horology colleagues and mine I address him this last and supreme farewell.

== Publications ==
- La navigation atmosphérique, 1859.
- Un voyage aérien dans cinquante ans (unpublished), 1864.
- Invention et contrefaçon. A mes juges et à mes confrères, 1865.
- De Paris à Tournay en 3 heures. Histoire du ballon le Louis Blanc, 1873.
- Voyage du ballon le Louis-Blanc, 1874.
