= Port à l'Anglais Bridge =

Bridge in France

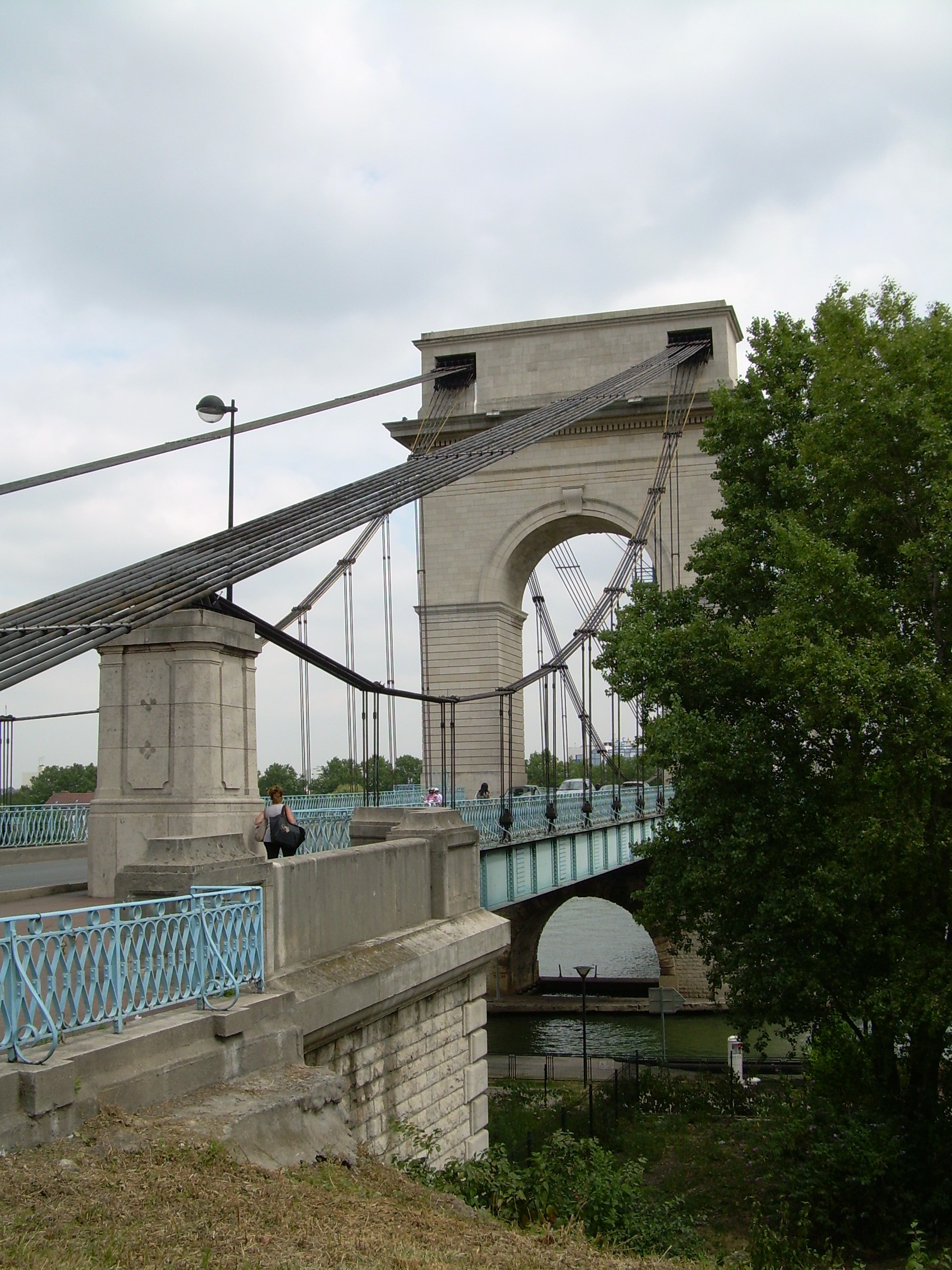
- Coordinates: 48°47′50″N 02°25′08″E
- Crosses: The Seine between Alfortville and Vitry-sur-Seine
- Locale: Suburbs of Paris, France
- Official name: Pont du Port à l’Anglais

Characteristics
- Material: Steel, masonry
- Total length: 230 m (754.5 ft)
- Longest span: 124 m (406.8 ft)

History
- Constructed by: Châlon, Albert Levaillant, Mayer
- Construction end: 1927

Location
- Interactive map of Port à l'Anglais Bridge

The Port à l'Anglais Bridge (French: pont du Port à l’Anglais) is a cable-stayed suspension bridge that spans the Seine river between the French communes Alfortville and Vitry-sur-Seine. It carries two lanes of automobile traffic and has pedestrian walkways on each side.

It has a main span of 124 m (406.8 ft) and side spans of 52 (170.6 ft) m and 54 m (177.1 ft), totaling 230 m (754.5 ft) in length.

== Construction and structural description ==
Local municipalities clamored for a new bridge in this area as early as the 1890s. After plans for a cantilever bridge fell through, the local government finally commissioned a competition in 1912, accepting submissions for any design type.

Completed in 1927, the winning engineers drew inspiration for their design from the French engineer Albert Gisclard. Gisclard developed an innovative suspension system that involved the addition of suspender cables to a bridge's diagonal stays. This allowed for the removal of the main parabolic suspension cable characteristic of most suspension bridges. This design omission resulted in a structure's increased stiffness.

== Qualifications as structural art ==
A lack of historical records limits a quantitative analysis of the costs associated with constructing the bridge. Still, comparing the bridge to a similar structure like Roebling's Covington-Cincinnati Bridge and Gisclard's Cassagne Bridge in France provides qualitative insights. By virtue of scale, the l'Anglais Bridge requires less building material than the Covington-Cincinnati Bridge and thus probably cost less. The former spans a third of the latter's 322 m (1,057 ft). In addition, the l'Anglais Bridge did not require a main parabolic suspension cable because its innovative cable system provided more stiffness. Therefore, even if Roebling's structure were on the same scale as the l'Anglais Bridge, his design required more materials to make the parabolic cables on top of the trussed bridge deck and diagonal stays. Moreover, Gisclard's Cassagne Bridge, which spans 253 m (830.0 ft), is almost on scale with Roebling's Covington-Cincinnati Bridge in length and still manages to remove its main parabolic cables. This suggests that the design of Gisclard's cable system itself may reduce costs because it avoids the construction of large parabolic cables.

The same design that probably improved the bridge's efficiency and economy obscures readability of the flow of structural loads. Like the Covington-Cincinnati Bridge, the l'Anglais Bridge carries automobile and pedestrian live loads travel in bending along the deck and in tension along the cables towards the towers, which are in compression. Whereas Roebling’s design elegantly expresses this flow, the logic of the Gisclard-influenced cables is not as visually accessible. The l'Anglais Bridge's main-spanning cables resemble two oddly combined parabolic cables that form a confusing suspension cable-diagonal stay hybrid. Specifically, one half of the cables have the slanted stiffness characteristic of diagonal stay cables and the other half resembles a deformed parabolic cable. This design does not clearly express the paths that forces acting on the bridge travel.

The bridge has a symbolic significance. It appears on memorabilia including postcards and stamps.

== See also ==
- John A. Roebling Suspension Bridge
- John A. Roebling
- Structural art
- List of crossings of the River Seine
