= Balloon mail =

Post transported with gas balloons

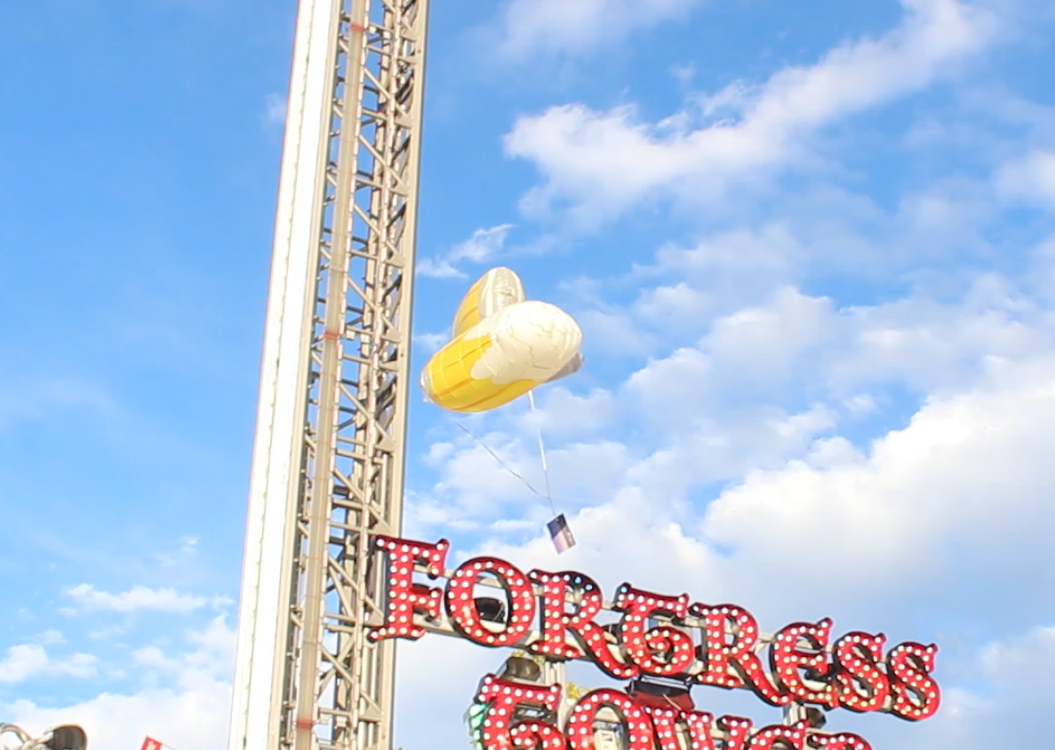
Launch of two balloons carrying a postcard at Cannstatt Fun Fair on September 27, 2024

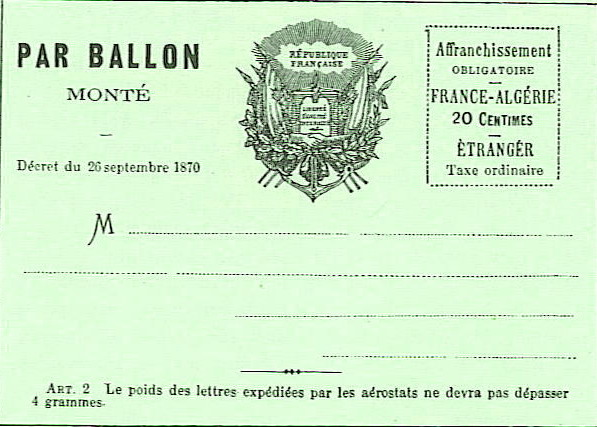
The address side of a balloon post card from the 1870 siege of Paris during the Franco-Prussian War

Balloon mail is the transport of mail (usually for weight reasons in the form of a postcard) carrying the name of the sender by means of an unguided hydrogen or helium filled balloon. Because the balloon is not controllable, the delivery of balloon mail is left to good fortune; often the balloon and postcard are lost. A found balloon is intended to be returned to the sender (by conventional post) with an indication of the discovery site, so the sender can determine how far their balloon flew. Balloon mail is often sent as part of a balloon competition.

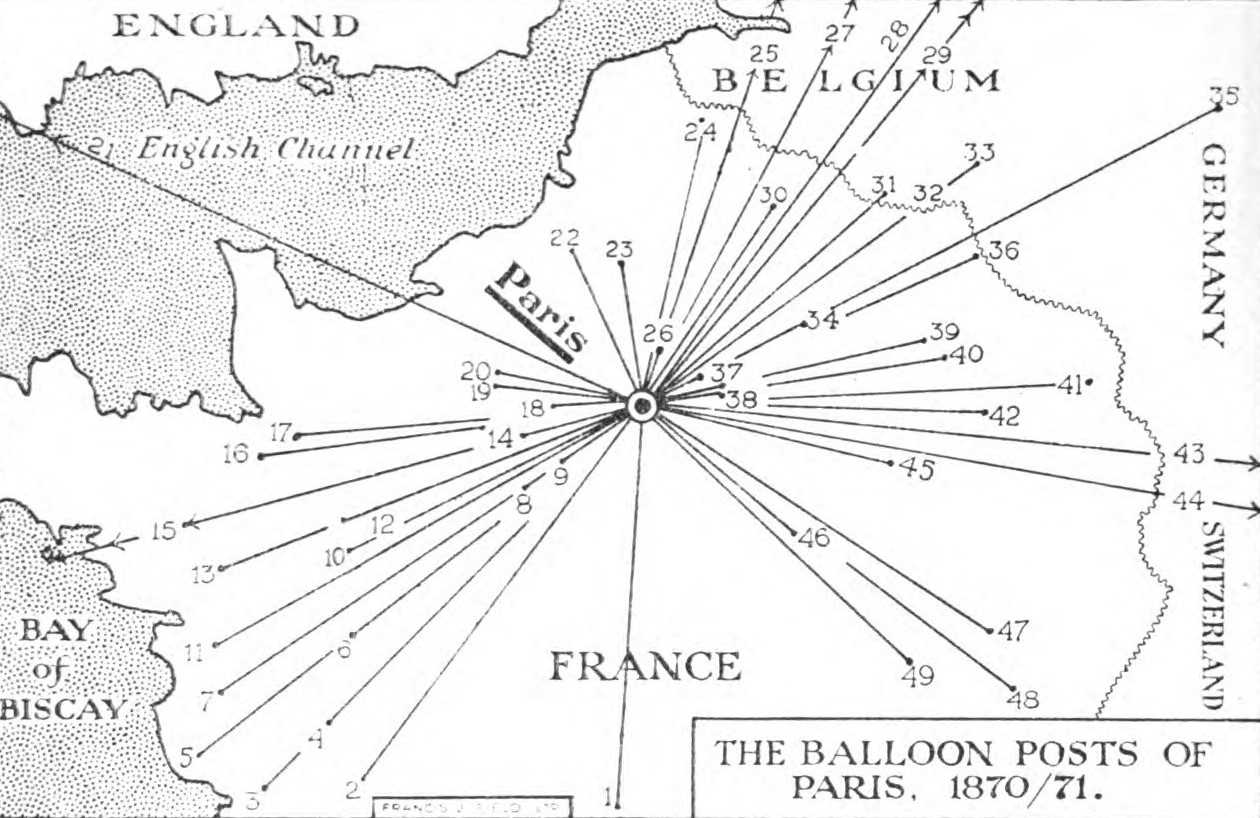
The balloon mail posts of Paris in 1870

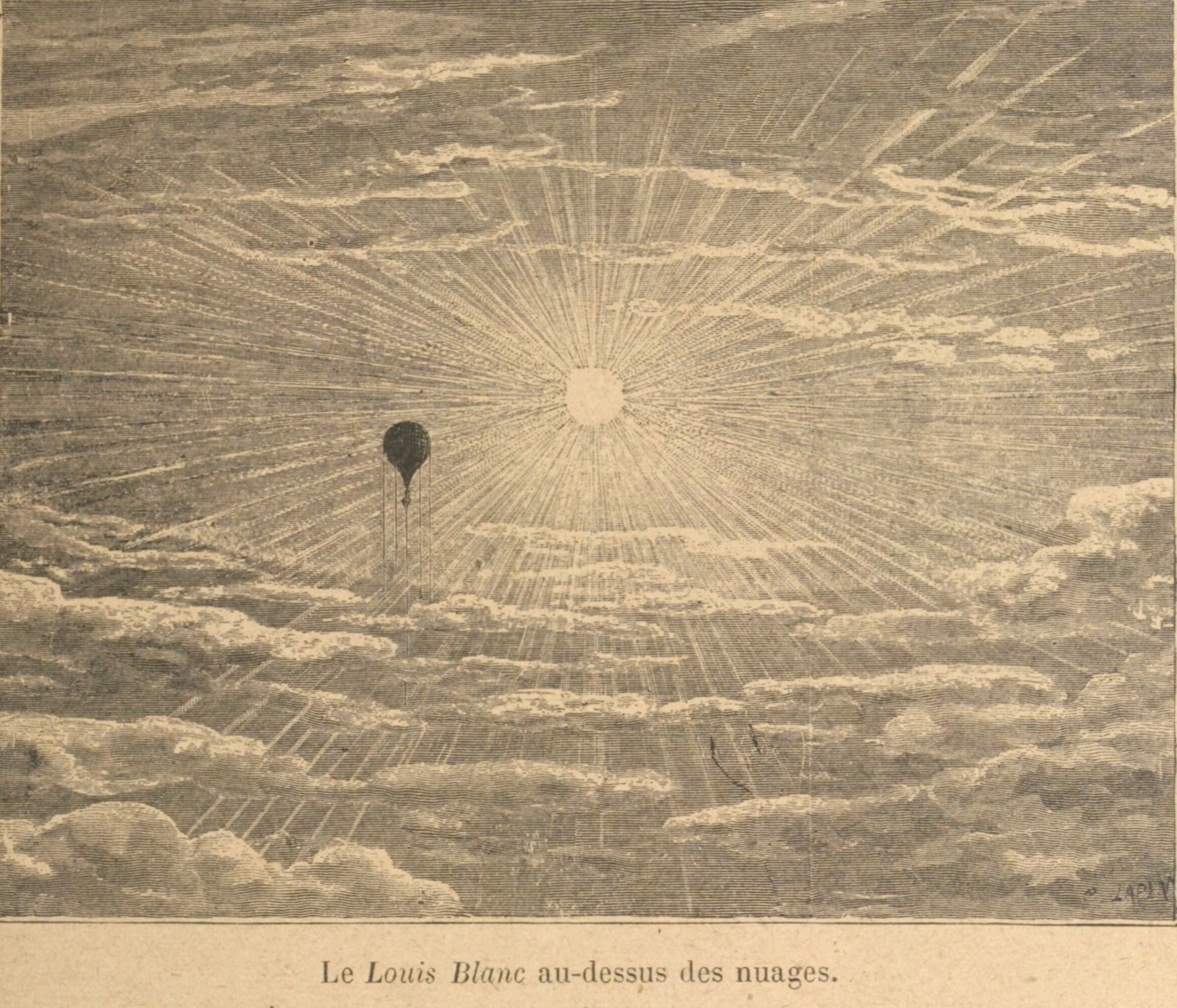
The Louis Blanc, piloted by Eugène Farcot on 12 October 1870, was the 10th balloon mail of the 66 sent during the siege.

Historically, balloons were used to transport mail from Paris during the Siege of Paris of 1870–1871. About 66 unguided mail balloons were released from Paris to communicate with the outside world; the great majority succeeded in delivering their cargo. As Prussian forces surrounded the city, telegraph lines were cut and messengers were captured, shot or turned back. Two services were proposed: ballon monté (manned balloon) and ballon non-monté (unmanned). In practice only manned flights were used. After the siege, Anglo-French scientist Dr Pierre Wesby travelled to Burton-on-Trent, where in 1873 he started a business to transport mail from England across the Irish Sea to Dublin. It is not known how this venture turned out; the records of Wesby's company were lost in 1916 when a bomb from the Zeppelin L 19 destroyed them.

In 1877, a 5-cent stamp for balloon postage was privately printed in Nashville, Tennessee, to carry mail on a June 18 flight of the "Buffalo Balloon" from that city to Gallatin, Tennessee. Of the 300 stamps produced, only 23 were used.

Balloon mail was sent from Przemyśl, Poland (near the Ukrainian border), during World War I.

Balloon mail has been used for spreading information and propaganda materials, in particular for spreading propaganda to the population in countries with dictatorial governments. A balloon can be released from outside the sphere of influence of these governments and, wind permitting, can travel several hundred kilometers. This method of balloon mail has been used by private activists to distribute leaflets to Warsaw Pact countries from West Germany in the mid-1950s, and by South Koreans to North Korea discussing the health of their leader, Kim Jong-il.
