= Benno Hann von Weyhern =

Prussian General of the Cavalry (1808–1890)

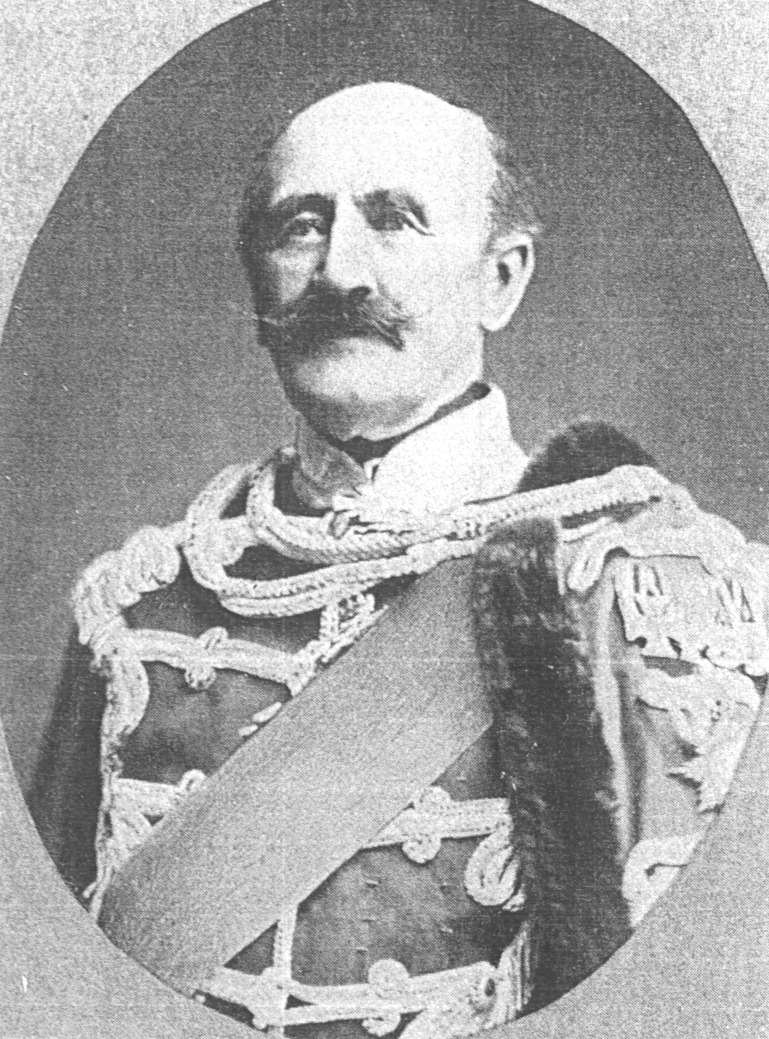
- Born: 23 October 1808; Lübben, Brandenburg, Prussia
- Died: 2 November 1890 (aged 82); Frankfurt an der Oder, Brandenburg, Germany
- Military career
- Allegiance: Kingdom of Saxony; Kingdom of Prussia; Schleswig-Holstein; North German Confederation; German Empire
- Branch: Royal Saxon Army; Prussian Army; Schleswig-Holstein Army; Imperial German Army
- Service years: 1821 – 1881
- Rank: General of the Cavalry
- Commands: 2nd Cavalry Division
- Conflicts: First Schleswig War: Battle of Dybbøl; Battle of Kolding; Battle of Fredericia; Battle of Vojens; Austro-Prussian War: Königgrätz campaign; Battle of Podol; Battle of Münchengrätz; Battle of Königgrätz; Battle of Blumenau; Franco-Prussian War: Battle of Gravelotte; Siege of Metz; Siege of Paris; Battle of Villiers; Battle of Dijon

Otto Rudolf Benno Hann von Weyhern Sr. was a Prussian General of the Cavalry during the First Schleswig War, the Austro-Prussian War and the Franco-Prussian War. He commanded the 2nd Cavalry Division during the Battle of Königgrätz.

== Origin ==
Benno Hann von Weyhern comes from the 1752 ennobled von Hann noble family which also called itself “Hann von Weyhern” after their Weyhern family estate in the Upper Palatinate. His parents were Major General Josef Hann von Weyhern (1765–1840) and Christiane Caroline Elisabeth Hermann.

== Early Career and First Schleswig War ==
Hann von Weyhern began his military career in 1821 at the Saxon cadet school in Dresden. In 1824, he switched to Prussian service and was employed in the 3rd Hussar Regiment. There he was promoted to Rittmeister and squadron chief by 1844. In 1848, Hann von Weyhern took part in the battles at Battle of Dybbøl, Fridericia and Woyens during the First Schleswig War. However, in the same year he retired with a pension and the right to wear his regimental uniform. In 1849 he received promotion to major and permission to enter service in the war. In the same year, Hann von Weyhern became a lieutenant colonel and commander of the 1st Dragoon Regiment in the Schleswig-Holstein Army. So he stood again against Denmark in the field and took part in the Battle of Kolding but by 1850, he resigned service in Schleswig-Holstein.

In 1852 Hann von Weyhern returned to Prussian service and was employed with a license as major à la suite in the 2nd Dragoon Regiment. In 1853, he was employed as director of the military riding school in Schwedt. In 1856, Hann von Weyhern became commander of the 5th Hussar Regiment and was promoted to lieutenant colonel in the same year and colonel in 1859. He also received à la suite employment as commander of the 10th Cavalry Brigade and was put in charge of the 7th Cavalry Brigade in the same year. In 1863, he was promoted to major general.

== Austro-Prussian War ==
During the mobilization for the Austro-Prussian War, Hann von Weyhern was commander of the 2nd Cavalry Division of the First Army. He took part in the battles at Podol, Münchengrätz and Blumenau as well as in the Battle of Königgrätz. On 17 September 1866 Hann von Weyhern became commander of the 4th Division and three days later promoted to Lieutenant General with the award of the Order of the Crown, 2nd Class with swords.

In the Franco-Prussian War, Hann von Weyhern fought in the battles of Gravelotte, Villiers, Siege of Metz and Paris, and in the Battle of Dijon. Awarded both classes of the Iron Cross, he became Commanding General of the II Army Corps in 1871 and was promoted to General of the Cavalru. As head of the 5th Hussar Regiment, which he was from 1872, Hann von Weyhern received the Grand Cross of the Order of the Red Eagle in early September 1873 with oak leaves and swords. The following year he accompanied Crown Prince Friedrich to St. Petersburg where Tsar Alexander II awarded him the Order of Alexander Nevsky. Emperor Wilhelm I honored Hann von Weyhern in mid-September 1879 by awarding him the Order of the Black Eagle. Leaving him in his position as regimental commander, Hann von Weyhern retired on 14 June 1881 and was awarded the Grand Commander of the Royal House Order of Hohenzollern.

== Personal life ==
Hann von Weyhern married Bertha Elisabeth Dorothea von Boltenstern (1811–1881) on 2 February 1832 in Halle (Saale) who was the daughter of the Prussian Major Magnus Ferdinand Wilhelm Franz von Boltenstern (1786–1814). The marriage produced two children.

- Benno Hann von Weyhern Jr. (1833–1912), Prussian lieutenant general ⚭ 1857 Julie Charlotte Friederike Adelaide von Kahle (* 1840)
- Hedwig Beate Mathilde Karoline (* 1850) ⚭ 1872 Robert Henning von Heyden († before 1821), lord of Obernitz, ducal Chamberlain of Saxony-Meiningen, Prussian captain a. D. and right knight of the Order of St. John
