= Eduard Clam-Gallas =

Austrian general (1805–1891)

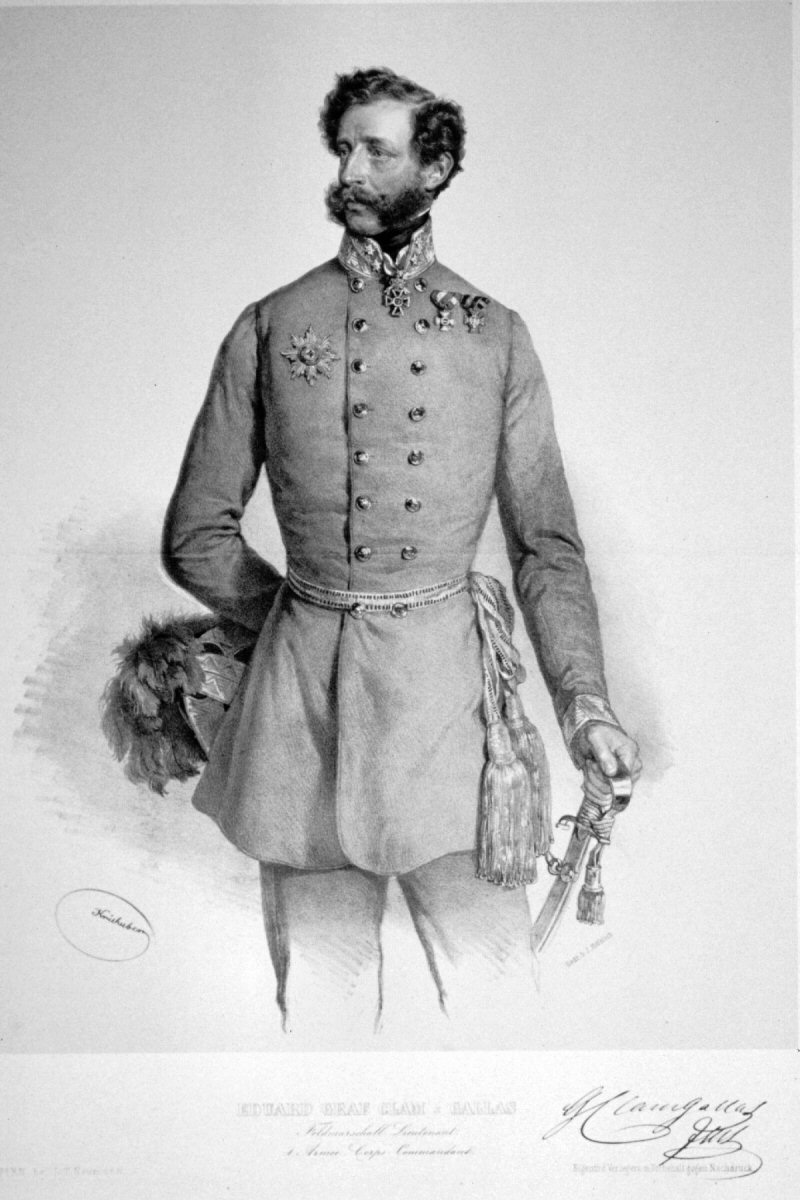
- Clam-Gallas in 1849
- Born: 14 March 1805; Prague, Austrian Empire
- Died: 17 March 1891 (aged 86); Vienna, Austria-Hungary
- Relatives: Clothilde von Dietrichstein (1828–1899)
- Military career
- Allegiance: Austria
- Service years: 1823–1866
- Rank: General der Kavallerie
- Unit: Cavalry
- Commands: 1st Transylvanian Army Corps, 1st Bohemian Army Corps
- Conflicts: First Italian Independence War; Battle of Santa Lucia; Battle of Vicenza; Battle of Custoza; Hungarian Revolution of 1848; Battle of Segesvár; Second Italian War of Independence; Battle of Magenta; Battle of Solferino; Austro-Prussian War; Battle of Podol; Battle of Münchengrätz; Battle of Gitschin
- Awards: Military Order of Maria Theresa
- Other work: Member of the Aulic Council

Count Eduard Clam-Gallas (14 March 1805 – 17 March 1891) was an Austrian general.

== Early life ==
He was the eldest son of Count Christian Christoph von Clam-Gallas (1771–1838), patron of Beethoven, and his wife, Countess Josephine von Clary-Aldringen (1777–1828).

== Career ==
In 1823 Clam-Gallas joined the Army, at first as a Rittmeister (Captain) of the 1st Cavalry Regiment in 1831, then Commander (1835), Colonel (1840) and General in Prague (1846).

In 1848, called to Italy under the orders of General Joseph Radetzky, he commanded a brigade which distinguished itself at Santa Lucia, Vicenza and the Battle of Custoza. He was decorated with the Military Order of Maria Theresa and promoted to Field Marshal Lieutenant (equivalent of two-star general).

In April 1849 he became commander of the Transylvanian Army Corps which needed to return to Turkey (7,000 infantry, 1,600 horse and 36 cannon). At the beginning of July he was moving into Hungary to Hungarian: Brassó (now Romanian: Braşov), to support Alexander von Lüders on the right flank. In this month there were a few battles between Lüders, Józef Bem and Sándor Gál. During the Transylvanian summer campaign, Clam-Gallas was defeated by Bem, but after that was able to defeat Sándor Gál and his Székels Army. After occupying Székely Land he joined Lüders and together they defeated Bem at Segesvár.

In 1850, he was head of the I Army Corps of Bohemia in Vienna, and in the Second Italian War of Independence (1859) took part in the Battle of Magenta and the Battle of Solferino. This army corps was one of the first to be repelled, but this failure had no personal consequences for Clam-Gallas, who was promoted to General der Kavallerie.

In 1861 he was admitted to the Aulic Council before becoming, in 1865, Imperial Hofmeister.

At the start of the Austro-Prussian War Clam-Gallas, still in command of I Corps, was given command of units (60,000 men) detached from North Army, called Iser Army and consisting out of his own I Corps, the retreating Royal Saxon Army Corps, the Austrian brigade evacuated out of Holstein, and an Austrian light cavalry division. In the course of the War, he suffered defeats at Podol, Münchengrätz and Jičín. After reuniting his force with North Army under Ludwig von Benedek he reverted to command of I Corps. He was relieved of his command and replaced by Count Leopold Gondrecourt in the early morning of 3 July 1866 and thus took no part in the defeat of the Austrian main army at Königgrätz that day.

For his defeat at Jičín he was court-martialled, but he was acquitted because of his position in society. He spent his final years in retirement in Frýdlant and Liberec in Bohemia (now the Czech Republic).

== Personal life ==
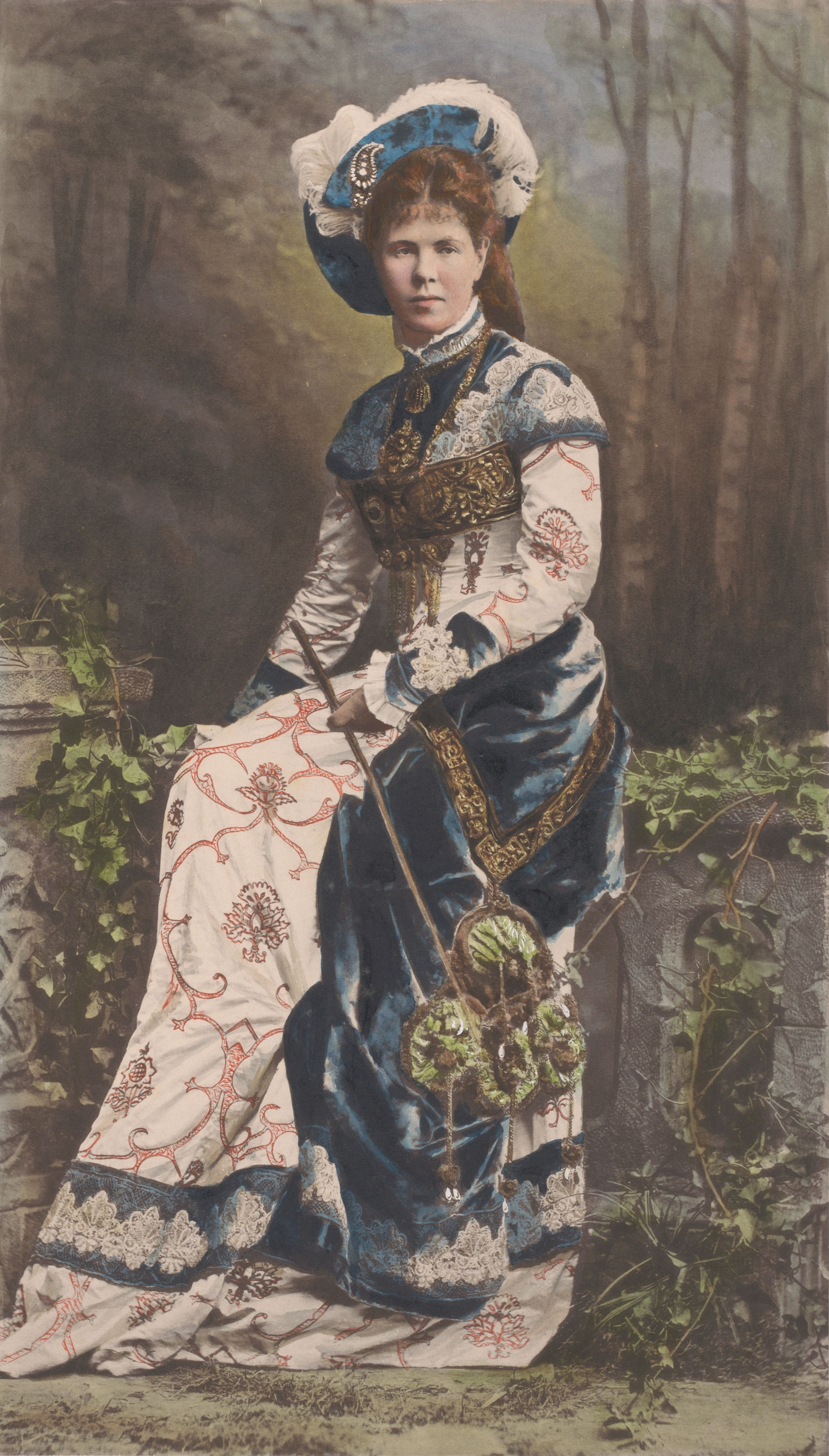
Portrait of his daughter, Eduardine, Princess of Khevenhüller-Metsch

In 1850 he married Countess Clothilde von Dietrichstein-Proskau (1828–1899), youngest daughter of co-heiress of Prince Joseph-Franz von Dietrichstein, and sister-in-law of Alexander von Mensdorff-Pouilly, a senior minister of the Austrian Empire and a brother-in-arms during the Battle of Magenta. Together, they had one son and two daughters:

- Countess Eduardine Clam-Gallas (1851–1925), who married Johann, 6th Prince of Khevenhüller-Metsch.
- Count Franz Clam-Gallas (1854–1930), who married Countess Maria von Hoyos-Sprinzenstein, a daughter of Count Ernst Karl von Hoyos-Sprinzenstein and Countess Eleonore von Paar.
- Countess Clotilde Clam-Gallas (1859–1947), who married Count Koloman Festetics von Tolna.

Count Clam-Gallas died on 17 March 1891.
