= Leopold Gondrecourt =

Austro-Hungarian general (1816–1888)

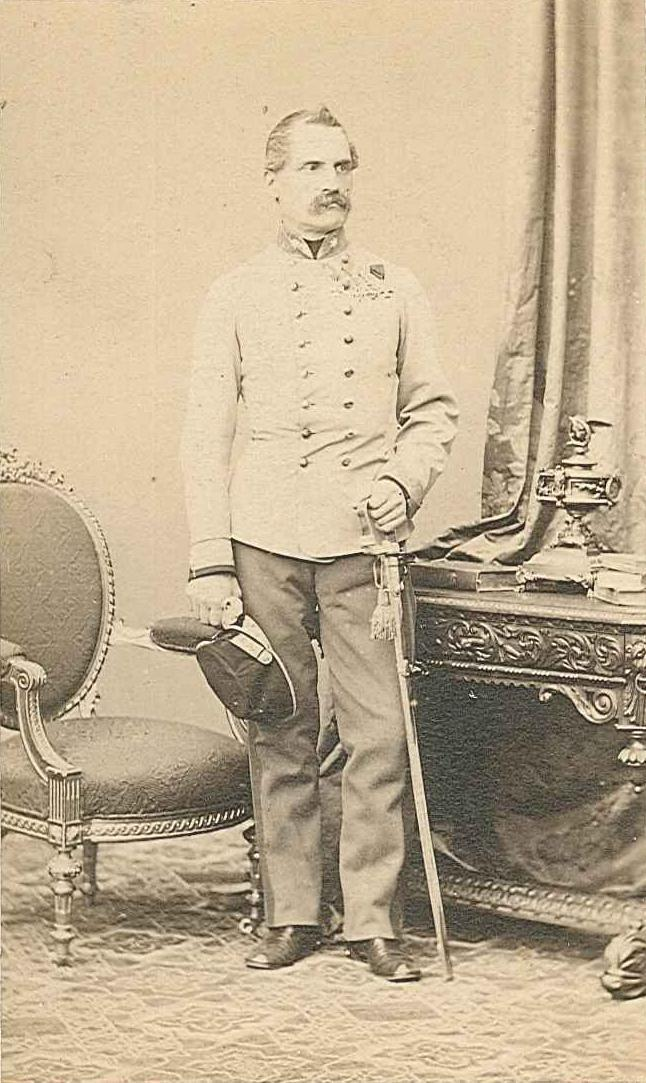
- Born: 13 May 1816; Nancy, Meurthe, France
- Died: 22 May 1888 (aged 72); Salzburg, Duchy of Salzburg, Austria-Hungary
- Education: École spéciale militaire de Saint-Cyr
- Military career
- Allegiance: Austrian Empire; Austria-Hungary
- Branch: Imperial Austrian Army; Austro-Hungarian Army
- Service years: 1838–1888
- Rank: Major General
- Conflicts: Second Schleswig War; Battle for Königshügel; Austro-Prussian War; Battle of Hühnerwasser; Battle of Gitschin
- Awards: Military Order of Maria Theresia; Pour le Merite

Count Leopold Gondrecourt (1816–1888) was an Austro-Hungarian general of French origin most notable for his service in the Battle for Königshügel.

== Biography ==
After attending the École spéciale militaire de Saint-Cyr in Saint-Cyr-l'École, Count Gondrecourt entered the service of the Austrian army. At the end of 1863, he was appointed as a brigadier in command of a 4800-strong brigade that was to be sent to Schleswig-Holstein and set out from Prague on 17 and 18 December 1863. Initially an Austrian contingent of the federal German troops in the federal execution against the duchies of Holstein and Lauenburg; the brigade then continued to serve along the Prussian Army in the Second Schleswig War. On 3 February 1864, together with the Prussian brigade "Canstein", Gondrecourt's unit stormed the area in front of the Danewerk during the Battle for Königshügel near Selk. For the successful capture of the Königshügel, he was awarded the Military Order of Maria Theresa. For his services in the war, the Prussian commander Friedrich Graf von Wrangel suggested to the Prussian King Wilhelm I that Gondrecourt be awarded the order Pour le Mérite 'for his praiseworthy behavior in the battle near Oberselk and the storming of the Königsberg, as already mentioned in my earlier proposal, but also for his excellent bravura in Veile on the 8th of the month'. King Wilhelm I then awarded him this medal on 18 August 1864.

In 1864 Gondrecourt was appointed chief steward and tutor of the six-year-old Archduke Crown Prince Rudolf. The boy, who was appointed colonel at birth, was to be raised to be a soldier. For this purpose Gondrecourt used harsh military educational methods, such as water treatment, waking up with pistol shots, nocturnal exposure in the zoo, as well as hours of exercise. Eventually one of his subordinates, Josef Latour, informed the archduke's stay abroad mother, Empress Elisabeth of Austria-Hungary, about the negative effects of these methods on her son. She presented an ultimatum resulting in Emperor Franz Joseph I dismissing Gondrecourt in 1866.

He then became the commandant of the Theresienstadt fortress. In 1866 he became adjutant to General Eduard Clam-Gallas in the 1st Army Corps, later commanding general with the rank of major general of the same. In 1888 Gondrecourt was released into retirement and died within the same year.

== Awards ==
- Military Order of Maria Theresa
- Pour le Mérite

== See also ==
- List of the Pour le Mérite (military class) recipients

=== Bibliography ===
- Brigitte Hamann. Kronprinz Rudolf. Ein Leben. Piper Verlag. Munich 2006. ISBN 978-3-492-24572-2. Pages 28–32.
- Constantin von Wurzbach: "Gondrecourt, Leopold Graf." In: Biographisches Lexikon des Kaiserthums Oesterreich (Biographical Lexicon of the Empire of Austria). Part 11 Kaiserlich-königliche Hof- und Staatsdruckerei, Vienna 1864, p. 417 f. (digitalised).
