= Sekera =

Sekera (Czech and Slovak feminine: Sekerová) is a Czech and Slovak surname, meaning 'axe'. However, the surname also appears in India. Notable people with the surname include:

- Andrej Sekera (born 1986), Slovak ice hockey player
- Milan Sekera (born 2002), Slovak footballer
- Miroslav Sekera (born 1975), Czech pianist
- Navniet Sekera (born 1971), Indian police officer
- Václav Jan Sekera (1815–1875), Czech naturalist and pharmacist
- Zdeněk Sekera (1905–1973), Czech scientist
- Zuzana Sekerová (born 1984), Slovak gymnast
