= Alexander von Schoeler =

Prussian general (1807–1894)

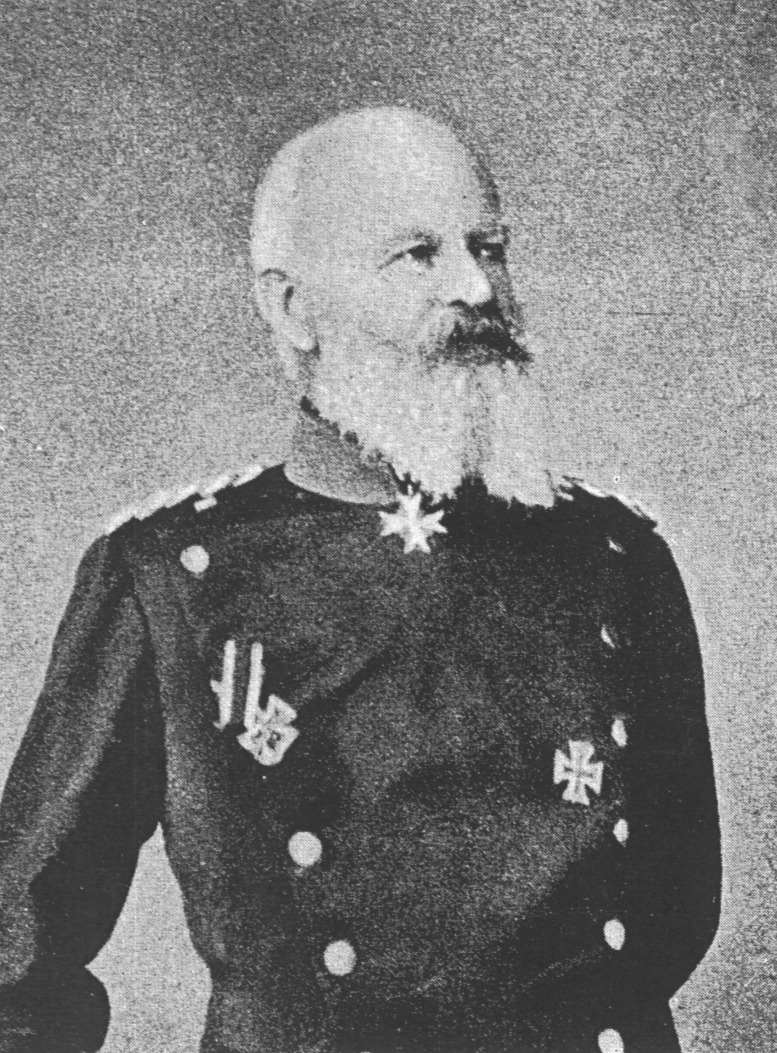
- Born: 22 March 1807; Potsdam, Brandenburg, Prussia
- Died: 23 August 1894 (aged 87); Coburg, Upper Franconia, Bavaria, German Empire
- Spouse: Ottilie Börger (m. 1848–1894)
- Military career
- Allegiance: Prussia; North German Confederation
- Branch: Prussian Army
- Service years: 1825 – 1871
- Rank: char. General of the Infantry
- Conflicts: German revolutions of 1848–1849; First Schleswig War: Battle of Schleswig; Austro-Prussian War: Battle of Hühnerwasser; Battle of Münchengrätz; Battle of Königgrätz; Franco-Prussian War: Battle of Beaumont; Battle of Sedan; Siege of Paris
- Awards: Pour le Merite; Military Order of Max Joseph

Theodor Alexander Viktor Ernst von Schoeler (1807-1894) was a Prussian General of the Infantry who served in the Austro-Prussian War and the Franco-Prussian War through several battles.

== Biography ==
=== Origin ===
Alexander was a son of the later Prussian general and Director of the General War Department Moritz von Schoeler and his wife Eleonore, née Burgräfin and Countess von Dohna-Lauck. His paternal grandfather was Major General Johann Friedrich Wilhelm von Schoeler, and his maternal grandfather was Major General August Burggraf und Graf zu Dohna-Lauck. His uncle, Friedrich von Schoeler, was a Prussian general and Knight of the Order of the Black Eagle.

=== Military career ===
Schoeler joined the Prussian Army on 28 April 1824. He first served in the 2nd Guards Grenadier Regiment and was promoted to second lieutenant in mid-November 1825. From mid-February 1830 to early April 1833 he was battalion and then regimental adjutant until the end of June 1836. In 1838 he was appointed to the General Command of the Guard Corps. Schoeler rose to the rank of first lieutenant in April 1841 and became a company commander on 13 April 1847, when he was promoted to captain. Schoeler took part in the suppression of the German revolutions of 1848–1849 and later in the year, during the First Schleswig War, in the Battle of Schleswig. During his secondment as adjutant at the High Command in the Marches, Schoeler was listed as a supernumerary officer of his regiment at the end of November 1849 and two years later, with the status of à la suite, became an adjutant at the General Command of the III Army Corps. As a major on mid-June 1853, he was transferred to the staff of the Guards Infantry Command. At the end of December 1856, he was briefly sent to the General Command of the VI Corps. After his promotion to lieutenant colonel, he was appointed chief of staff of the VI Corps on 30 May 1857. He was promoted to colonel at the end of May 1859 and was put in charge of the 12th Combined Infantry Regiment on 5 May 1860; the unit becoming the 52nd Infantry Regiment in early July. Schoeler was regimental commander until 19 December 1863. Then he was appointed à la suite commander of the 31st Infantry Brigade and promoted to major general at the end of June 1864. In the Austro-Prussian War, Schoeler and his brigade moved into Bohemia in 1866 as part of the Army of the Elbe under command of General of the Infantry Eberhard Herwarth von Bittenfeld. Schoeler distinguished himself in the battles at Hühnerwasser and Königgrätz. On Bittenfeld's recommendation, he was awarded the order Pour le Mérite by King William I of Prussia. During the final phase of the campaign in Bohemia, Schoeler took over leadership of the 8th Infantry Division from General August Wilhelm von Horn on 21 July 1866, and was promoted to lieutenant general at the end of September 1866.

Herwarth von Bittenfeld's report to the king, dated 4 August 1866, which contained the award recommendation, said:

Through the active, energetic leadership of the vanguard of the Army of the Elbe during the entire campaign, and through his victorious successes in both battles near Hünerwasser on 26 June, the battle near Münchengrätz on 28 June and in the battle near Königgrätz on 3 July, he emerges as worthy of a special award.

After the beginning of the Franco-Prussian War, Schoeler's division was assembled as part of the IV Army Corps in the Mannheim area by 29 July 1870, and marched into France via Tours. After the pursuit of the retreating French, the 8th Division met the enemy again on 30 August at the Battle of Beaumont. On 1 September, Schoeler's troops also participated in the Battle of Sedan where they were able to recapture the lost suburb of Balan. On September 16, the 8th Division reached Nanteuil, forming the right wing of the 3rd Army, and took part in the Siege of Paris a few days later. In addition to both classes of the Iron Cross, he was awarded the Knight's Cross of the Military Order of Max Joseph.

With the award of the Order of the Red Eagle, First Class with Oak Leaves, Schoeler retired at his own request before the peace treaty on 22 April 1871 was signed. After his retirement he was given the character of General of the Infantry.

=== Family ===
On 5 April 1848 he married Ottilie Börger (1828-1895), who also worked as a writer. The marriage produced several children:

- Charlotte (b. 1849)
- Mauritius (b. 1851)
- Viktor (1852–1932), merchant ⚭ 24 February 1892, Janie Cecilia Torras (b. 1865)
- Valerie (1853–1933)
- Rüdiger (1855–1909), major, recipient of the Fidicin Medal
- Waldemar (1868–1945), chamberlain and cabinet councilor of the ruling princes of Waldeck and Pyrmont ⚭ 23 September 1897, Else (Less) Hepner (1870–1948) (her granddaughter was the actress Sasha von Scherler)
