= Battle for Königshügel =

Battle of the Second Schleswig War

Coordinates: 54.4773°N 9.5638°E

Battle of Königshügel
- Part of Second Schleswig War
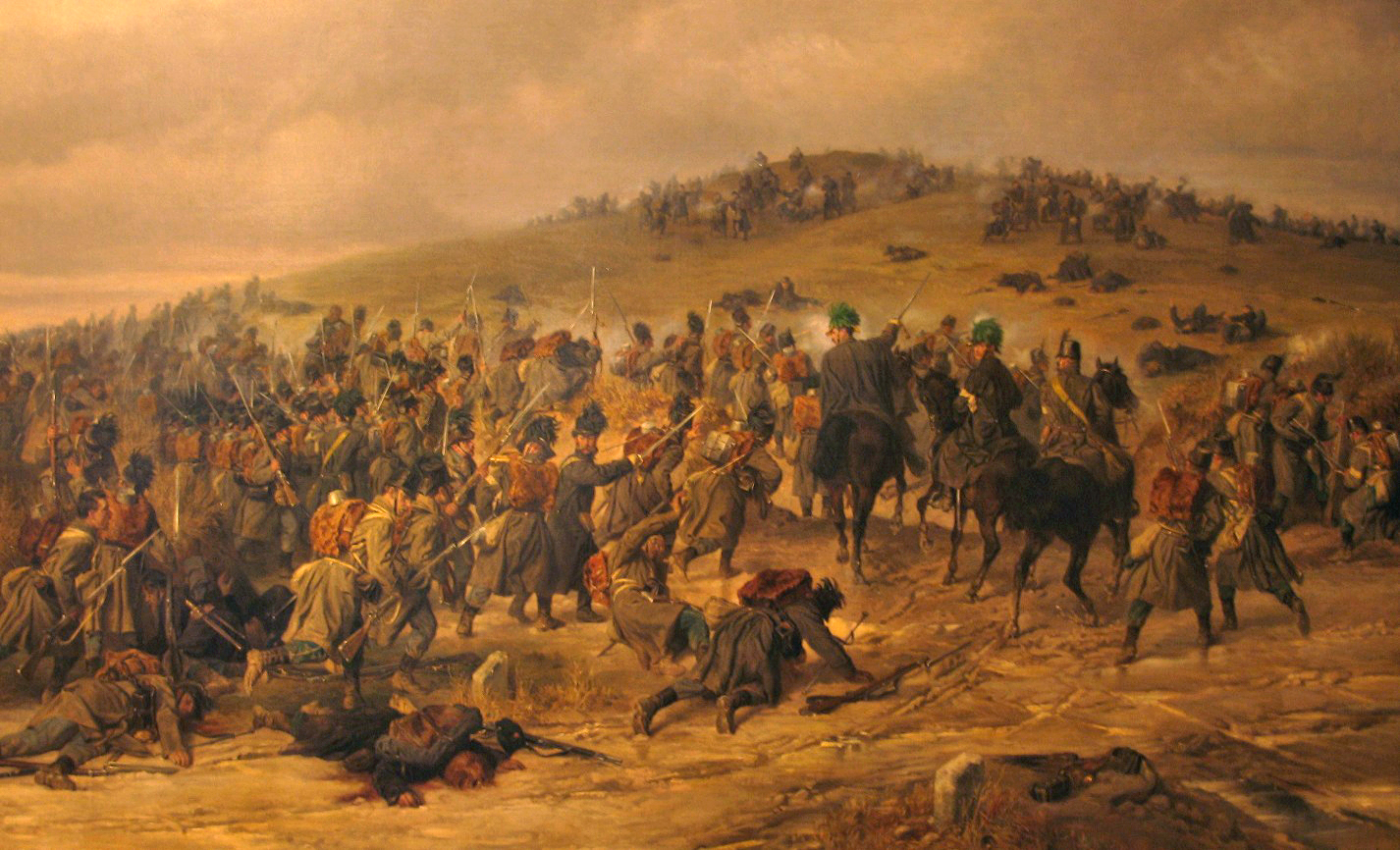
- The storming of Königsberg near Oberselk; Siegmund L'Allemand, 1864
Date	February 3, 1864
Location	Königshügel, Schleswig, Denmark
Result	Austrian victory

Belligerents
Austria	Denmark

Commanders and leaders
Ludwig von Gablenz; Leopold Gondrecourt	Peter Frederik Rist; Sophus Schack

Strength
4,538 Infantry	Around 1,000 Infantry

Casualties and losses
432 killed, wounded, captured or missing	419 killed, wounded, captured or missing
- Location within Schleswig-Holstein

The Battle of Königshügel (Danish: Kampene ved Kongshøj), also known as the Battle of Ober-Selk fought on 3 February 1864, was a battle in the Second Schleswig War where Austrian Major General Gondrecourt and his infantry brigade succeeded in occupying the area in front of the Danevirke near Ober-Selk (Danish: Øvre Selk) and taking the strategically important village of Königshügel (Danish: Kongshøj).

== Background ==
After the Second Schleswig War had begun, Prussian and Austrian troops crossed into Schleswig on 1 February 1864 against the resistance of the Federal Assembly of the German Confederation, and war became inevitable. The Austrians attacked towards the refortified Dannevirke frontally while the Prussian forces struck the Danish fortifications at Mysunde (on the Schlei coast of Schwansen east of Schleswig, trying to bypass the Danevirke by crossing the frozen Schlei inlet, but in six hours could not take the Danish positions, and retreated. The Austrian forces were led by Leopold Gondrecourt and were ordered to capture the town of Königshügel, in order to gain a strategic position.

== Battle ==
The Austrians had begun to occupy Fahrdorf because there was a gate of the Danevirke at this point and they wanted to be sure not to hit the flank when advancing against Ober-Selk to be caught. At 12:15 p.m. the column passed Brekendorf and advanced on Ober-Selk when it encountered a Danish battalion. A Battaltion of the 30th Regiment advanced immediately to the right of the path, while a Jäger battalion under Lieutenant Colonel von Tobias approached from the left. The Danes, on the other hand, used the hedgerows of the nearby moorland to seek cover and formed defensive positions there. On the Danish side, a division under Lieutenant General Steinmann that morning consisted of three battalions and 4 guns, which were on the outposts from Fahrdorf around the Noor via Altmühl, Selk to Jagel. There it was possible to inflict casualties on the Austrians. Nevertheless, the Austrians continued to advance and were in front of Ober-Selk at around 1:30 p.m.

At 2 p.m. a passage opened at the Danevirke and the Danish infantry moved out onto the area in front of them: In front, a battalion of the 11th Regiment under Major Rist, which was advancing to Ober-Selk; a battalion of the 2nd Regiment under Captain J.C.T Thalbritzer; a Battalion of the 21st Regiment under Major O.C.F Sabye and the sister battalion, a battalion of the 21st Regiment under Captain W. Hackke, which went towards Klosterkromarched. Then a Battalion of the 9th Regiment under Major J. Nørgaer, which was reinforced from the left by a battalion of the 20th Regiment under Major S.P.L Schack and advanced directly on Königshügel. There the Austrians now faced an enemy of about 24 companies. The battery chief of the Gondrecourt Brigade, Captain Modricki, took up a position with his guns east of the road on the front plateau north of Ober-Selk and supported him by shelling the Danish guns on Königshügel. After the position of the Danes went ripe for assault, a Jäger battalion advanced to attack Ober-Selk and took it after brief resistance.

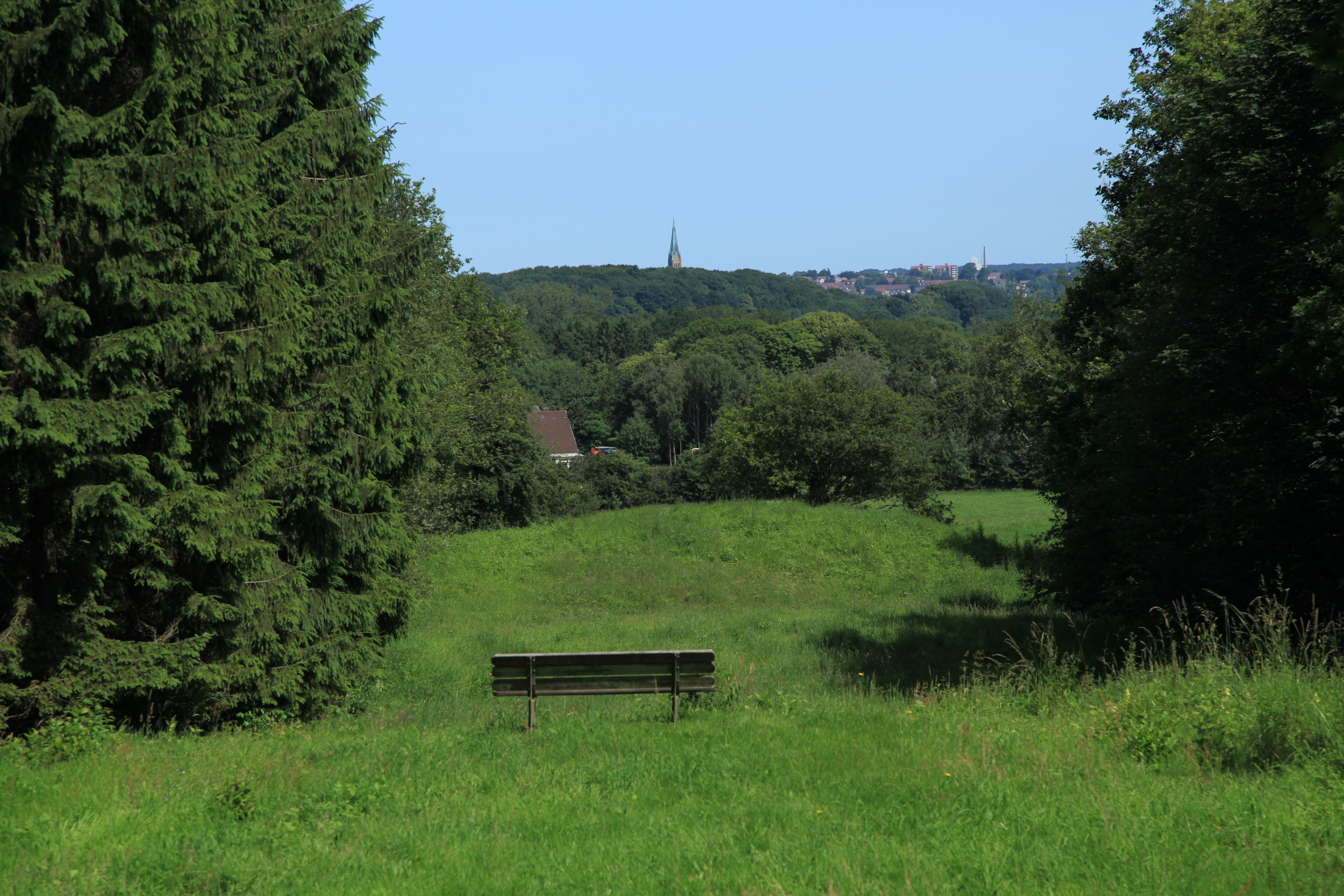
View from Königshügel to Schleswig behind the Danevirke

The goal for the Austrians had already been achieved. However, Major General Gondrecourt immediately recognized that the village could only be secured by taking Königshügel on the opposite side. The Danes defended the town fiercely, by using skilled rifle fire and fixed bayonets, in order to push the Austrians back. But at 2:30 p.m. Königshügel was in Austrian hands. While a Jäger battalion remained in Königshügel, the remaining battalions pursued the Danes back into the opposite valley. The Austrians suffered heavy losses, as they were now being fired at by the guns from the Danevirke, so they fell back to Königshügel, which they began arming with heavy artillery.

The capture of Königshügel was strategically important, as its prominent location provided an insight into the entire Danevirke position. When Königshügel was taken, an Austrian battalion crossed the railway line on the left wing to attack Jagel. At 3:00 p.m. the remaining Danish forces were met there. The Danes were quickly pushed back with a bayonet charge on Klosterkrug. The advance could initially be stopped by the Danish cannons, but when an Austrian Jäger battalion attacked the Danish left flank, it forced the Danes to withdraw back into the Dannevirke. By 4:00 p.m. the fighting had ended.

== Aftermath ==
Theodor Fontane remembered the Austrian units in the Austro-Prussian War during the Battle of Podol:

Podol was occupied by the Poschacher brigade, the so-called "iron brigade" (consisting of the Martini and King of Prussia regiments and the 18th Jäger Battalion); it was the same brigade that stormed Königshügel in the Schleswig War and, by taking away this dominant position, made a major contribution to the conquest of the Danes.

— Theodor Fontane,

By gaining the fore area, it was now possible for the Allies to station heavy artillery. The great disadvantage of the Danevirke as a medieval defensive position became clear. It was a wall and not a modern trench system and therefore easy to fight with artillery. This was one of the reasons why the Danevirke had to be given up on February 5, 1864. See the Prinzenpalais of the reason for withdrawal:

...that the enemy has gathered at least 50,000 men, and has thus occupied the terrain which should be occupied by our outposts for security and which can hardly be regained. The enemy has also already been able to establish his artillery.

— Christian Julius de Meza

=== The Memorial ===
A memorial with the epitaph was erected for the fallen:

Your at Ober-Selk, Jagel, on Königsberg and at Wedelspang on III. February MDCCCLXIV fallen comrade-in-arms.
May this wreath be wound to the brave companions, Who found their cold grave here in strange earth
The good comrade
full of high heroism, who
bought our victory
with their heart's blood. - Home to Austria's Gauen
Hovers on the wings of fame
The name of all the heroes
From the grave on King's Hill.
The Imperial and Royal Brigade GM Graf Gondrecourt
XVIII. Field Hunter Battalion
XXX. Inft. Rgmt. FML Baron Martini
XXXIV. Inf. Rgmt. King WI of Prussia
II. Esk. Prince Liechtenstein Huszars N. IX
IV. Pf. Batr. N. II of the I. Art. Rgmts. Kaiser FJ
I. Train of the medical company.

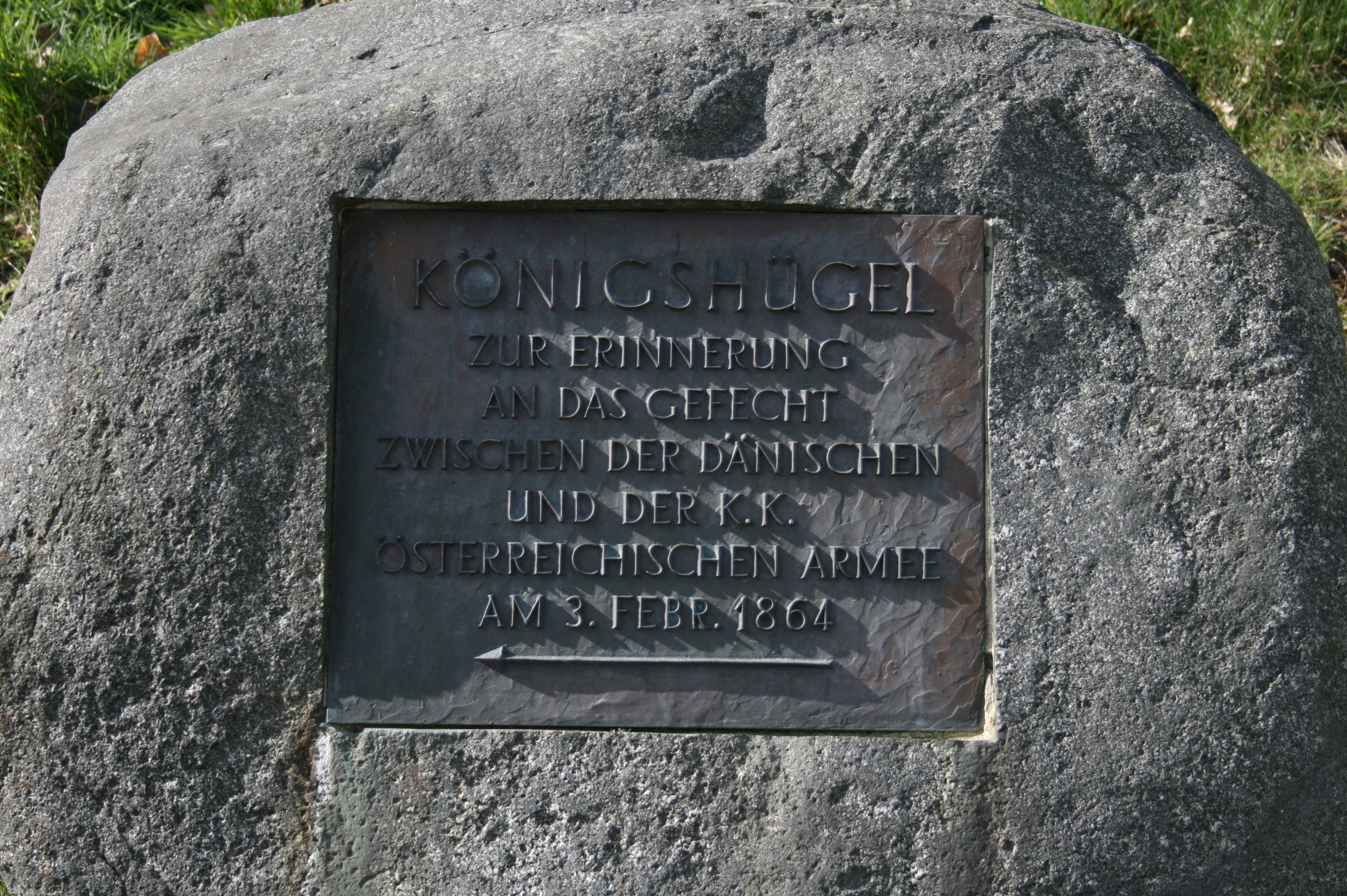
The blackboard of the memorial

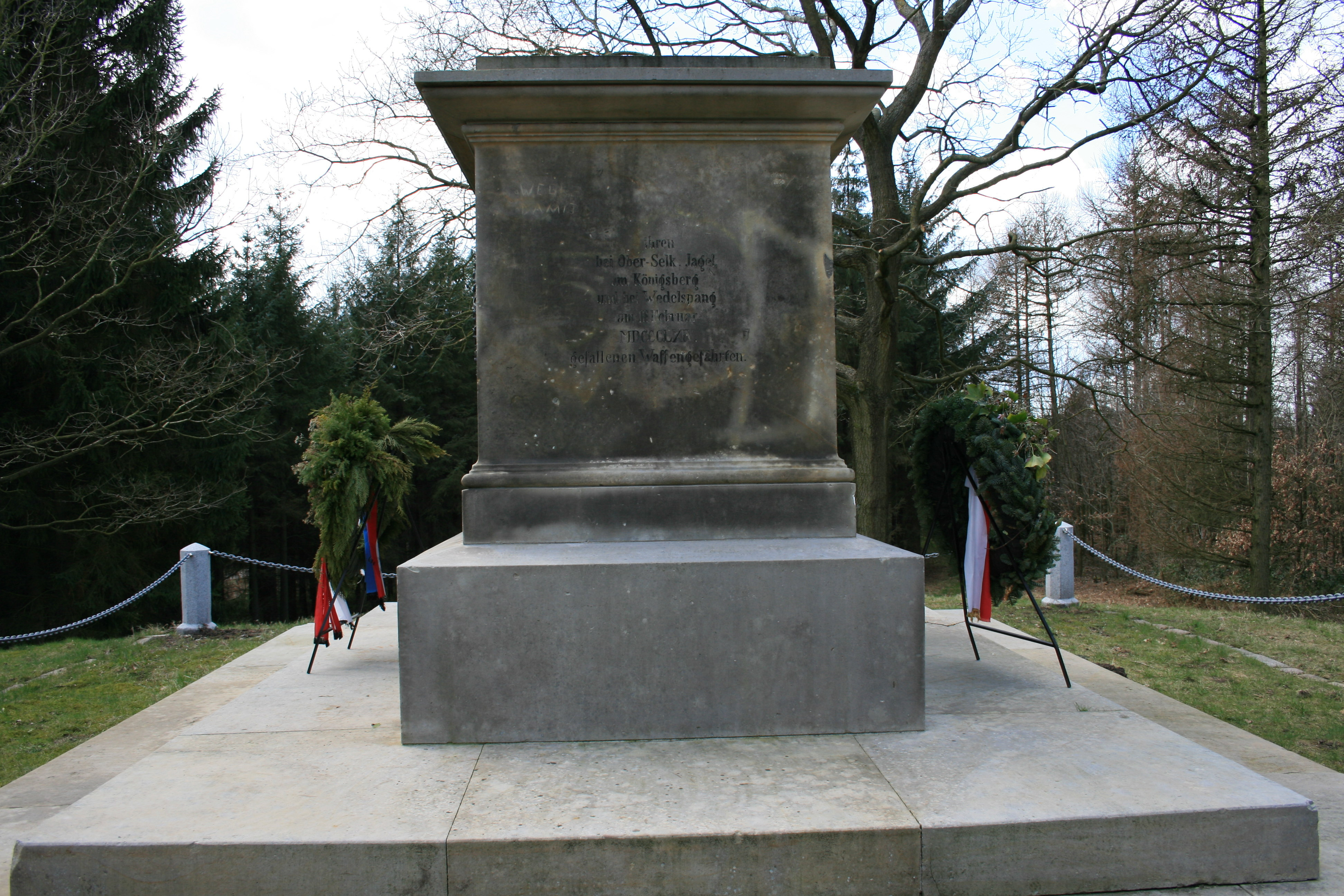
The front

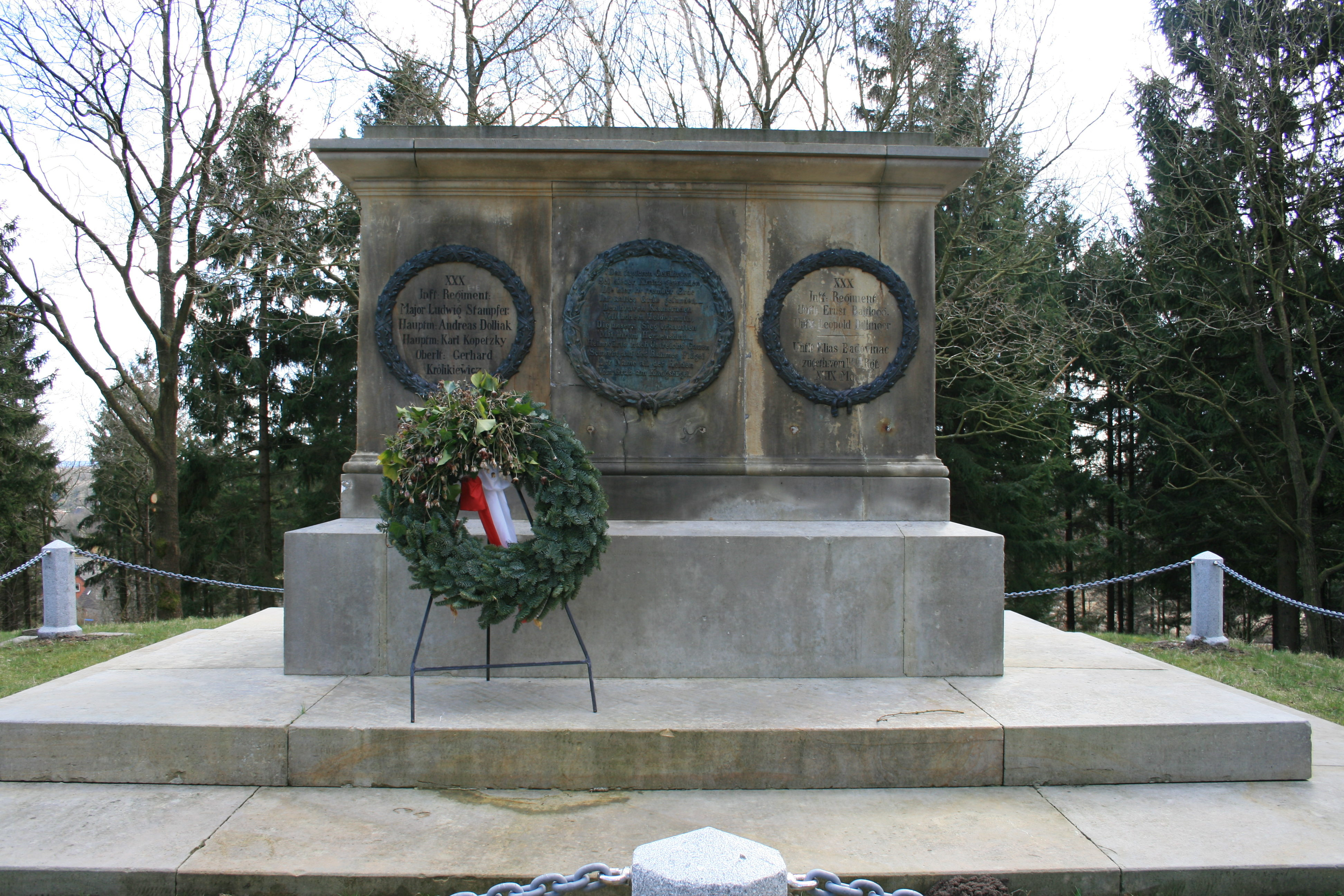
The right side

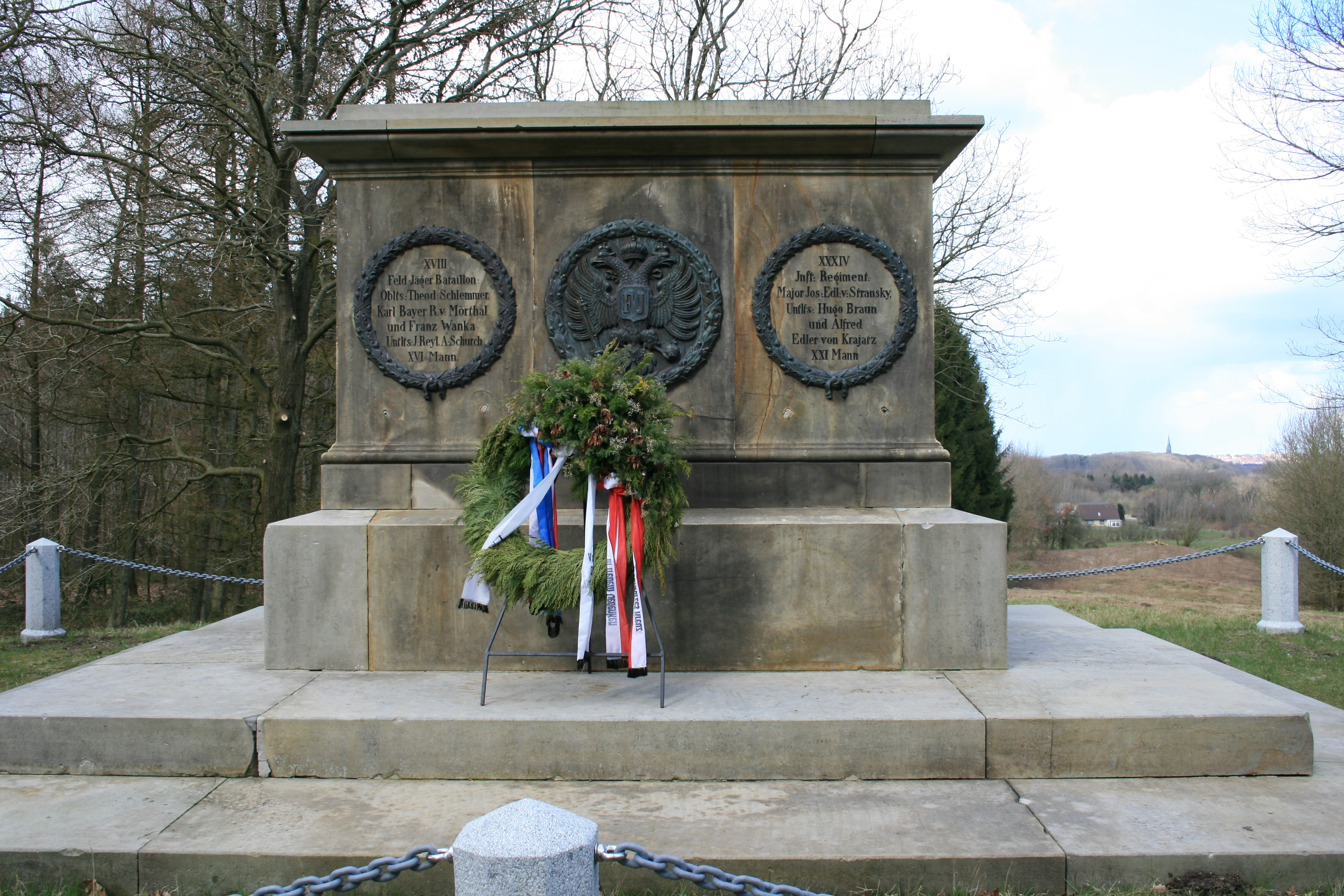
The left side

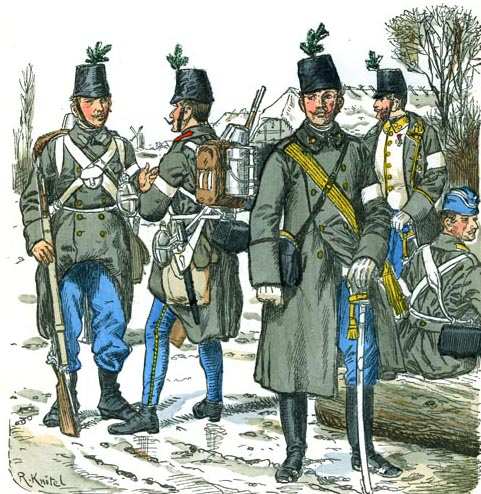
K.U.K. infantry in 1864

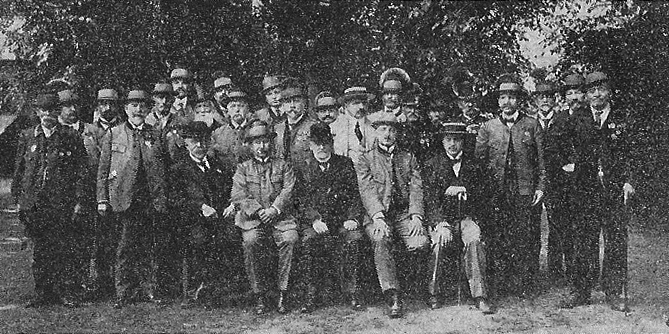
Austrian veterans around 1914

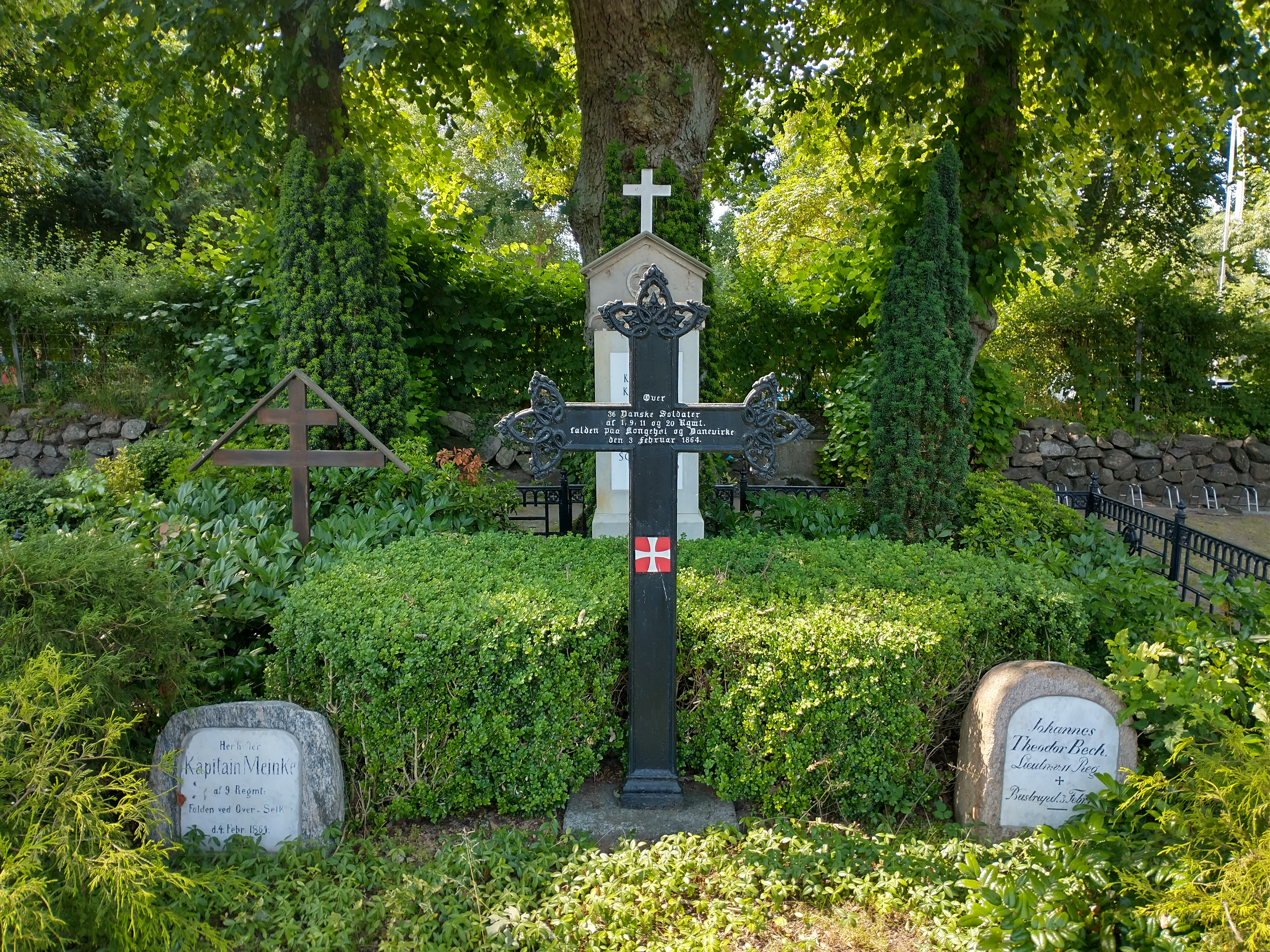
Danish war grave in Busdorf-Haddeby (Dan. Bustrup-Haddeby)

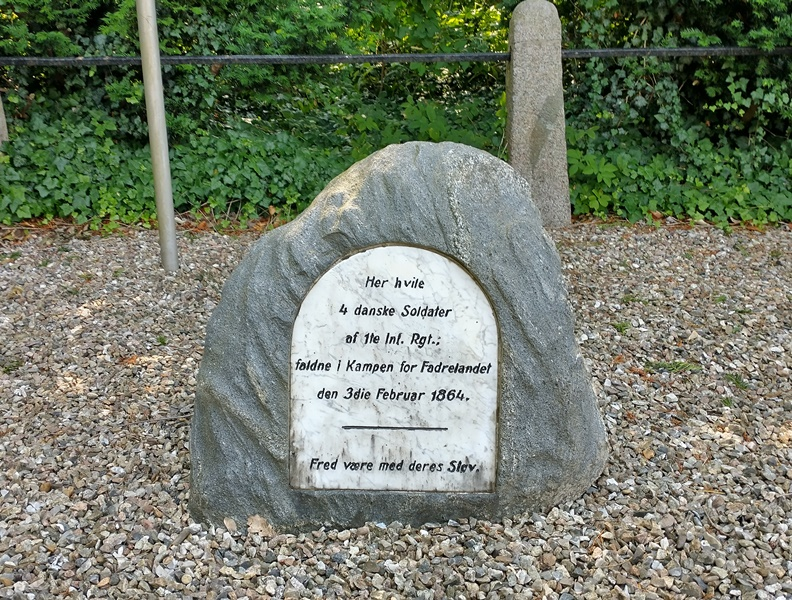
Danish war grave in Selk

== Bibliography ==
- Gerd Stolz: Das deutsch-dänische Schicksalsjahr 1864. Husum, Husum 2010, ISBN 978-3-89876-499-5.
- Winfried Vogel: Entscheidung 1864. Das Gefecht bei Düppel im Deutsch-Dänischen Krieg und seine Bedeutung für die Lösung der deutschen Frage. Bernard & Graefe, Koblenz 1987, ISBN 3-7637-5840-2.
