= Battle of Gitschin =

Battle during the Austro-Prussian War

Coordinates: 50.4373°N 15.3517°E

Battle of Jičín
- Part of Austro-Prussian War
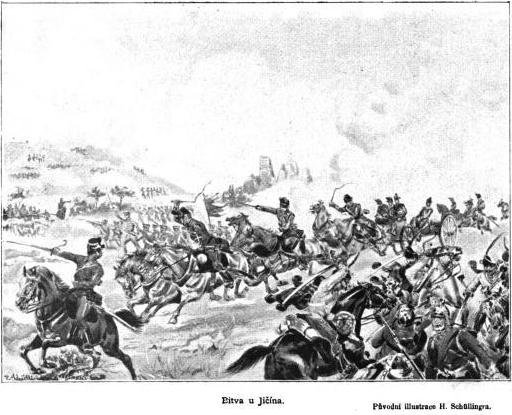
- Battle of Gitschin. Illustration by Hugo Schüllinger (1896)
Date	29 June 1866
Location	Jičín, Bohemia
Result	Prussian victory

Belligerents
(Kingdom of Prussia) Prussia	(Austrian Empire) Austria; Saxony

Commanders and leaders
(Kingdom of Prussia) August von Werder (Kingdom of Prussia) Wilhelm von Tümpling	(Austrian Empire) Eduard Clam-Gallas; Albert of Saxony

Strength
26,000	66,000 present 42,000 engaged

Casualties and losses
1,553; 329 killed 1,212 wounded	(Austrian Empire) 4,704 (Saxony) 591

The Battle of Gitschin or Jičín (German: Schlacht bei Gitschin) took place during the Austro-Prussian War on 29 June 1866, ending with a Prussian victory over the Austrian forces. There is a memorial there today at Jičín in the Czech Republic.

== Battle ==
=== Austrian Deployment ===
After being beaten at Münchengrätz, Iser army under Clam-Gallas redeployed at Jičín. Unaware that after the Battle of Skalitz Benedek had halted North Army's advance towards Jičín, where under the Austrian battle plan the conjunction of both armies would have taken place in order to fall upon one of the Prussian main armies to beat them in detail, Clam-Gallas was under the impression that he would be directly supported by Northern army's advance units (III Corps), and decided to give battle. Clam-Gallas' battle line consisted out of Abele's brigade at the Přivyšín heights on the left, supported by Ringelsheim's brigade blocking the road from Mnichovo Hradiště (Münchengrätz) at Lochov, the center at Brada Hill was held by Poschacher's brigade, supported by Leiningen's, and the town of Železnice (Eisenstadtl) on the right was to be held by Piret's brigade and the 1st Light Cavalry Division. The position between Poschacher and Piret was to be held by the Saxon army, which after taken a longer southern route from Münchengrätz had the previous night camped some 10 kilometers south of their designated position in the battle line, leaving a vulnerable gap between the Austrian center and right. The gap was temporarily filled by a 56 gun Austrian grand battery.

=== Prussian attack on Jičín ===
On June 29, 1866 after having won at Münchengrätz, the Prussian Elbe army and First Army each sent an infantry division towards Jičín. From the north, the Prussian 5th Division, under Wilhelm von Tümpling, advanced towards Jičín. After using his artillery batteries to soften up the Austrian position Tümpling attacked the center and right. The cannon fire startled the Saxons, whose advance brigade was still four kilometers from their designated position in the battle line. By 6:00 PM Poschacher's brigade was able to hold off attacks on their hill position by the Prussian 9th Brigade, and Abele had been able to stop the Prussian 10th Brigade's attack on the Privysin heights. At 6:00 PM advancing from the west, advance units from the Prussian 3rd Division, part of Elbe army and led by August von Werder, attacked Ringelsheim but were held off.

The next Prussian attack was directed at the center-right position at the hamlet of Zames where they encountered the Veronese 45th regiment of Piret's brigade, which they easily drove off. 9th Brigade was able to occupy the hamlet in the center of the Austrian position with two battalions. Neither Piret's brigade, nor Leiningen's reserve, were sent in to plug the hole in the Austrian center, leaving the Prussians in control of the center of the Austrian line. The feeble counterattacks by hussars from 1st Light Cavalry Division were easily held off by the Prussians. The Austrian artillery, bombarding the hamlet, then set Zames aflame, forcing the Prussians holding the hamlet to attack forward towards Dilec. The advancing Prussians were then able to beat the Saxons to Dilec and occupied the town at 7:30 PM. To plug this hole and to aid the faltering Saxons, Piret decided to attack the Prussians on his left but Piret was easily held off by the Prussians, reinforced by Tümpling's reserve battalion, and their use of the superior Dreyse needle gun to smash the Austrian storm columns, which then collapsed and fled. Simultaneously Werder's attack towards Lochov, in order to outflank Ringelsheim, caused the collapse of the Austrian left as well, and the Prussians were able to push Abele and Ringelsheim back to Jičín, which they eventually occupied at 10:30 PM.

At 8:00 PM the Austrian staff received Benedek's new orders, which had been sent by horseback, announcing North Army's about face and his order for Iser army to join him. Given these orders Prince Albert of Saxony despite pleadings of the Austrians to use his battle fresh troops to counterattack the Prussians, decided to withdraw his five brigades from the field, causing the Austrians to start a disorganized retreat as well.

== Result ==
Although occupying a strong position Iser Army was beaten by two Prussian divisions due to strategic and tactical blunders. Tardy staff work at main headquarters caused Clam-Gallas to believe he would be supported by the Austrian main army, as was originally planned, but which made him fight the battle unsupported. The Saxon army camping some ten kilometers south of their designed position in the Austrian line, made them late and caused a hole in the battle line, which the Prussians exploited to their fullest. Lastly the superior Dreyse needle gun, gave the Prussians a huge tactical advantage over the Austrian storm tactics.

After Münchengratz the Prussian commanders however neglected to concentrate their hungry and tired Elbe Army and 1st Army rapidly enough to encircle and destroy Iser Army, in effect fighting with only two divisions from two separate armies, thus enabling Clam-Gallas to retreat towards Benedek. The victory, thereafter, made possible the junction of the first and second Prussian army corps, and had as an ultimate result the Austrian defeat at the Battle of Königgrätz.

== Literature ==
- Barry, Q. (2009). The Road to Königgrätz: Helmuth von Moltke and the Austro-Prussian War 1866. Solihull: Helion. ISBN 978-1-906033-37-8.
- Gordon Craig: The Battle of Königgrätz: Prussia’s Victory over Austria, 1866, University of Pennsylvania Press, Philadelphia, PA, 2003
- Theodor Fontane: Der Feldzug in Böhmen und Mähren 1866, Königl. Geheime Ober-Hofbuchdruckerei R.v.Decker Berlin, 1871
- Heinz Helmert; Hans-Jürgen Usczeck: Preußischdeutsche Kriege von 1864 bis 1871 - Militärischer Verlauf, 6. überarbeitete Auflage, Militärverlag der deutschen demokratischen Republik, Berlin 1988, ISBN 3-327-00222-3
- Wilhelm Rüstow: Der Krieg von 1866 in Deutschland und Italien. Zürich 1866 bei Schultheß
- Alan Sapherson: The Seven Weeks War 1866, Raider Books, Leeds, UK, 1989, ISBN 1-870445-49-X
- Geoffrey Wawro: The Austro-Prussian War: Austria’s War with Prussia and Italy in 1866, Cambridge University Press, Cambridge, UK, 1997
