= Peter Frederik Rist =

Danish author

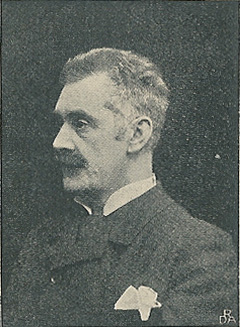
- Born: 7 July 1844; Copenhagen, Denmark
- Died: 25 June 1926 (aged 81)
- Military career
- Allegiance: Denmark
- Branch: Royal Danish Army
- Service years: 1864–1904
- Rank: Lieutenant colonel
- Conflicts: Second Schleswig War: Battle for Königshügel; Battle of Dybbøl (WIA)
- Other work: Author

Peter Frederik Rist (1844-1926) was a Danish officer and author that participated in the Second Schleswig War and is the author of several fiction and non-fiction books about his experiences in the war.

== Early years ==
Rist was born in Copenhagen; his parents were chamberlain August Ahlert Rist (died 1884) and Charlotte Frederikke born Philipsen (died 1863). Rist studied in the Det von Westenske Institut as he had his head full of fiction and theater, and even in the autumn of 1863 the view of the artium was probably a little cloudy but when the Second Schleswig War broke out, it was a significant contribution for inspiration for his works.

== Second Schleswig War and Military career ==
In January 1864 he became an officer aspirant and was part of the 9th Battalion in Fredericia, followed next month with Paul Ulrich Scharffenberg's brigade to Dybbøl and was wounded during the storming on the fortifications on 18 April. After his wounds were attended, he joined the rest of the campaign as a reserve second lieutenant. He was sent home after the conclusion of the peace and now had to study at the artium again; but for the second time the military stand took him and kept him. In 1866 he became second lieutenant of the 19th Battalion stationed at Nyborg, and in the next year was promoted to First Lieutenant and assigned to the 18th Battalion stationed in Copenhagen and Elsinore, in 1881 as captain and company commander of the 22nd Battalion at Elsinore was transferred 1888 to the 4th Regiment at Copenhagen. Finally, in 1893, he was appointed commander of the 15th Battalion stationed at Kastellet and the following year as a lieutenant colonel. He was posthumously promoted to Colonel after his retirement in 1904.

== Authorship ==
=== Non-fiction Works ===
He was most famously known a writer as during his career in the long Helsingør garrison, he often had leave to the capital, where i.a. Georg Brandes' lectures inspired him to produce poetry. He wrote a lot but he seemed easily captivated by self-critical discouragement, and all that was written was burned. He made his writing debut as a historical writer. After partially exploiting his historical studies in some popular journal treatises, in 1884 he published his vivid depictions of the 18th-century military service with the publication of From the Boot Age. Later he became co-editor of the deserving popular historical magazine Musæum in 1889. Just as he from 1888 had become an employee of Messages from the War Archives and from 1896 became head of the General Staff's war history works. He then published the book Olaf Rye's Saga (1899), which is a depiction based on letters, etc. In 1890, he was an editor on the book series Soldier Reading and in 1896, arranged the garrison library. Until his death, he was co-editor of the book series Memoirer og Breve (51 volumes, 1905–1927).

=== Fiction works ===
As a fiction writer, he has regularly resorted to his historical studies as a way to either seek refuge from fanaticism or to satisfy readers in a relaxed fashion as a slight inclination for the strange or perhaps simply to discern the occasional oppositional tendency through an old-fashioned costume. Thus, some larger and smaller historical short stories and historical pastiches have been created such as the book Pagebreve in 1898. His poetic debut book was A Recruit from 64 (1889). In the book, it contains a depiction of the brutal conditions of the war as well as a twist ending by the end. There were also a number of silhouettes of Danish commanders and privates and an extraordinarily vivid depiction of the sufferings of the war and of the way people deal with them. The publication was considered to be both fresh and gripping which encouraged Rist to publish the short story collection Soldiers (1890). Details were a notable factor within Rist's works as in the short story collection Jonathan (1894) with the depeiction of the young officer's light intoxication or in After Dybbøl (1892) where the story contained a depiction of a newly baked lieutenant's naive first love. In the latter however, Rist's drawing abilities has been criticized for a lack of a greater ability to give the color of environments and a lack to bring figures to life with healthy strokes. His last notable work was Månsson from Skaane which was published in 1903.

== Marriage and Travel ==
Rist had traveled a lot for impressions though these travels did not give inspiration to his poetry, which were primarily about Danish military figures. He had done this 3 times and partly for a long time, had been in Germany or Austria, a few times in Norway, once in the Netherlands and in 1880 at sea to the Mediterranean Sea and Egypt.

In 1874 he married Ida Møller (born 1850), daughter of the town bailiff in Frederikshavn Lorenz Bertelsen Møller and Caroline born Dømler.
