= Battle of Blumenau =

1866 battle in the Austro-Prussian war

Coordinates: 48.192398°N 17.053855°E

- Part of the Austro-Prussian War
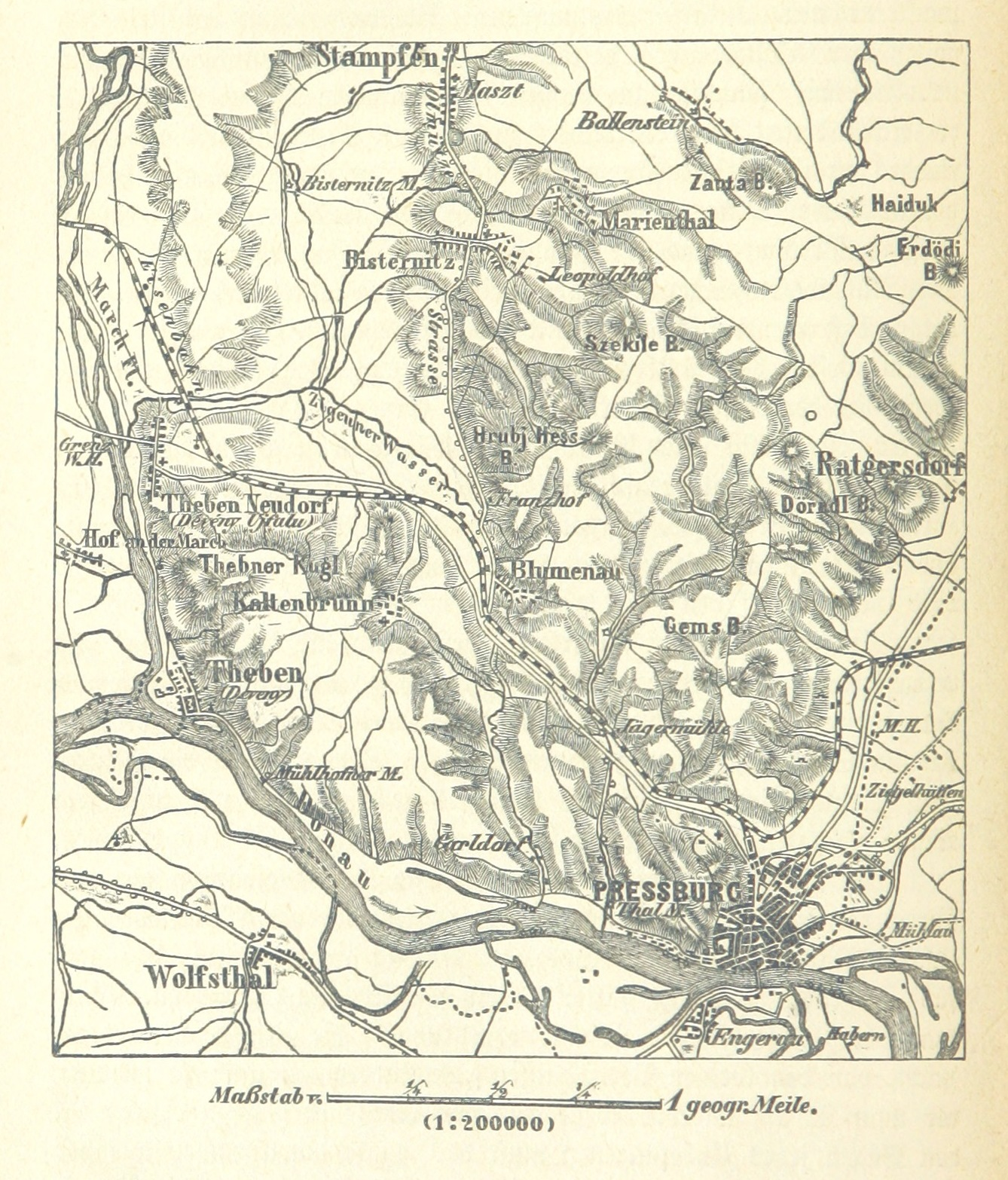
- Map of the battle
Date	22 July 1866
Location	Lamacs, Hungary (modern day Slovakia)
Result	Prussian victory

Belligerents
Prussia	Austria

Commanders and leaders
(Kingdom of Prussia) Eduard von Fransecky	(Austrian Empire) Karl von Thun und Hohenstein

Strength
18 infantry battalions 24 cavalry squadrons 78 guns	24 infantry battalions 11 cavalry squadrons 40 guns

Casualties and losses
207 men 27 killed 169 wounded 11 missing	490 men 61 killed 245 wounded 184 missing

The Battle of Blumenau or Battle of Lamač was the last battle fought in the Austro-Prussian War, on 22 July 1866 (on the day of the conclusion of peace), with the Austrians defending against the Prussian army.

== Overview ==
Prussian scout patrols were in Malacky on 19 July 1866, and in two days the Prussian army occupied Stomfa (Stupava). At that time it was evident that a cease fire would soon be negotiated, and so the Prussian General Eduard von Fransecky received the command to occupy Pressburg (Bratislava). The road from Stomfa to Pressburg ran through a valley in the Little Carpathians. High mountains rise alongside the road at this point, making it an easily defensible point.

The commander of the Austrian troops in Pressburg Archduke Albrecht had located one brigade there under the command of Colonel Mondela on 18 July. Colonel Mondela placed the right wing of the brigade between Hrubý Pleš and Leskara and the railway embankment, which protected the greater part of Mondela's brigade. The left wing was on the eastern and northeastern hillsides of Devínska Kobyla. The Austrian artillery was located near Lamač and Dúbravka, from which point it was able to control the road from Stomfa to Pressburg.

The brigade was reinforced on 19–21 July by the arrival of the 9th Austrian mountain regiment. On Sunday, the morning of 22 July, the Prussian army began the attack on Lamacs. The second part, under the command of Major-General Bose, moved ahead through over Kamzík hill to surround the Austrian defence and occupy Bratislava.

About half past six, the first shot was fired from the Austrian cannon. Prussian forces were warded off and around 8 o'clock they got General Eduard von Fransecky's message: a cease fire was in effect and would take effect at 12 o'clock, only five hours later. The Prussian General had mounted a large number of artillery pieces, so an artillery duel had already begun. The result was large fires in Lamač and Dúbravka. The Prussian forces were warded off, despite their superior numbers. The battle's success depended on a flanking manoeuvre of Major-General Bose. The brigade moved slowly over the difficult terrain and the ceasefire was already in effect when they arrived at Kamzík. By the setting of a line of demarcation, which overshot by Záhorská Bystrica, the Austro-Prussian war terminated the fights for domination over Germany and central Europe.

== See also ==
- Battles of the Austro-Prussian War
