= Karl von Thun und Hohenstein =

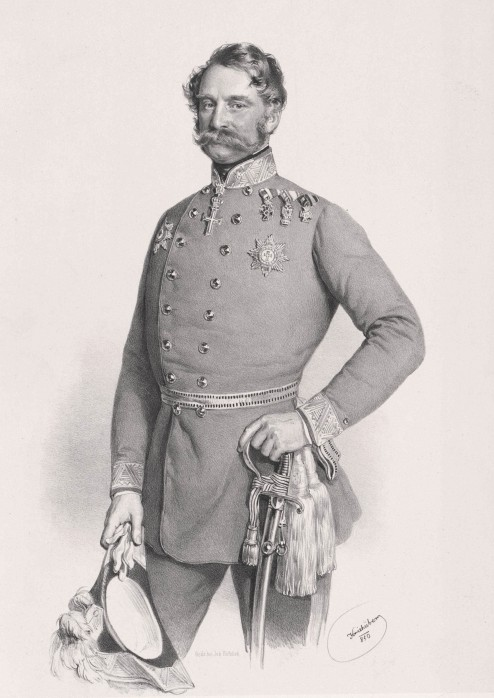
- Born: January 24, 1803; Vienna, Austria
- Died: January 16, 1876 (aged 72); Trieste, Imperial Free City of Trieste, Austria-Hungary
- Spouse: Johanna née Freiin von Koller (m. 1833–1876)
- Military career
- Allegiance: Austrian Empire
- Branch: Austria Army
- Service years: 1820 – 1867
- Rank: Feldzeugmeister
- Conflicts: First Italian War of Independence; Second Italian War of Independence; Austro-Prussian War: Battle of Königgrätz; Battle of Blumenau
- Awards: Order of the Iron Crown, 1st and 3rd Class

Karl von Thun und Hohenstein (1803–1876) was an Austrian officer who was notable for being the main Austrian commander at the Battle of Blumenau of the Austro-Prussian War.

== Biography ==
Karl was born on January 24, 1803, in Vienna as the son of landowner Count Joseph Johann Anton von Thun und Hohenstein (1767–1810) and Countess Eleonore von Thun und Hohenstein, née Fritsch (1775–1834), and younger brother of politician Joseph Matthias von Thun und Hohenstein (1794 –1863).

Count Thun began his military career in 1820 as a cadet in the cavalry and became a second lieutenant in 1821, a first lieutenant in 1826 and a captain-lieutenant in the infantry in 1831. In 1840 he became a major and in February 1848 was made colonel and commander of the 3rd Infantry Regiment. With his regiment he took part in most battles of the First Italian War of Independence and then served as a major general and brigade commander in the Hungarian Revolution of 1848, participating in the battles of Komárom and Temesvár. In 1850 he acted for a few months as a fortress commander in Budapest and shortly retired before returning as a brigade commander in 1852. In 1854, he became a Lieutenant Field Marshal and commanded a division in Opava.

In the Second Italian War of Independence he commanded the 15th Army Corps, which was newly formed to defend the coast, but was not deployed. He was subsequently commander of the VIII Corps in Italy. In late 1860 he was without a command again and from 1861 served as commander of all troops in the Austrian Littoral, based in Trieste. In August 1862 he became commander of II Corps and commanding general for Lower and Upper Austria, Salzburg and Styria in Vienna. In the Austro-Prussian War his corps was part of the army of Feldzeugmeister Ludwig Benedek, serving in Bohemia and being involved in heavy fighting in the Swiepwald. Hohenstein himself was slightly wounded in the Battle of Königgrätz. He briefly was without a command again and retired in 1867 with the rank of Feldzeugmeister.

Karl von Thun und Hohenstein received the Order of the Iron Crown, III Class in 1848 and in 1867 that of the 1st class. In 1849 he became a Knight of the Order of Leopold. In 1857, he became the owner of Infantry Regiment 29, 1859 Privy Council.

Karl later died on January 16, 1876, at Trieste at the age of 72.

He had been married to Johanna née Freiin von Koller (1809–1891) since March 7, 1833. The marriage remained childless.
