= Sophus Schack =

Danish painter (1811–1864)

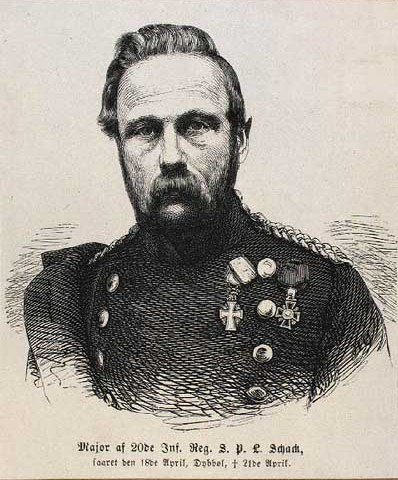
- Born: 21 January 1811; Copenhagen, Denmark-Norway
- Died: 21 April 1864 (aged 53); Copenhagen, Denmark
- Burial place: Garrison Cemetery, Copenhagen, Denmark
- Military career
- Allegiance: Denmark
- Branch: Royal Danish Army
- Service years: 1821–1864
- Rank: Major
- Conflicts: First Schleswig War; Second Schleswig War: Battle for Königshügel; Battle of Dybbøl (DOW)

Sophus Peter Lassenius Schack (21 January 1811 – 21 April 1864) was a Danish painter and officer who served in the First and Second Schleswig Wars.

== Biography ==
=== Military career ===
Schack was the son of barrister Gregers Schack. He became a cadet 1821 and promoted to second lieutenant in 1830 and in 1838 was characterized later in the following year as a true first lieutenant but was dismissed as early as 1842. However, he rejoined in July 1848 again as captain of the Third Reserve Battalion and participated in the First Schleswig War. In 1849 he became a Knight of Dannebrog. In 1860 he became captain guard in Rendsburg and in the same year was promoted to major. Schack would later participate as a major and battalion commander in the Second Schleswig War, and after being badly wounded on 18 April during the Battle of Dybbøl, he died on 21 April at a hospital in Copenhagen.

=== Painting career ===
Schack had shown interest in art from his youth, but could only, after being an officer for some years, sacrifice himself more calmly for his art studies. At the same time as he gained access to Christoffer Wilhelm Eckersberg's painting school, he visited the Royal Danish Academy of Fine Arts from 1835 to 1840 and won both its silver medals. He himself had perceived himself in relation to art as a dilettante, but now considered himself an artist, notwithstanding that, despite his diligence, his formation, and his unmistakable love of art, he did not reach any high place. He exhibited partly portraits and genre pictures, partly biblical pictures on topics of the New Testament. His pieces were inspired from Eckersberg's works and was even encouraged by Christian VIII himself. From 1844 to 45, Schack was given two years of travel support for the academy for France and Sardinia–Piedmont; he had also been commissioned to produce an altarpiece, Christi Bjærgprædiken, which was only delivered after the king's death, and a large picture for Christian VIII's and Queen Caroline Amalie's Coronation. His works are preserved at Kronborg. Schack later published a couple of volumes of Physiognomic Studies (1858–59), in which his best qualities as an artist were associated with a spirited gift of production as a writer.

=== Personal life and legacy ===
Schack married Vilhelmine Bothilde Olsen (1826-1900) in 1853, daughter of Colonel and cartographer Oluf Nicolai Olsen. Their daughter Laura Cathrine Marie Schack married the painter Ole Pedersen on 28 November 1890 in Copenhagen.

He was buried in Garrison Cemetery. There is a self-portrait from 1859 (formerly in Johan Hansen's collection), a pen drawing by Vilhelm Rosenstand ( Camp scene ) 1863 (Frederiksborg Museum), a portrait of the woodcuts Fallen Officers in 1864 and Fallen at Dybbøl, a woodcut drawing in 1864 by Henrik Olrik and a Lithograph in 1867 by Edvard Fortling.
