= Julius von Bose =

Prussian general

Friedrich Julius Wilhelm Graf von Bose
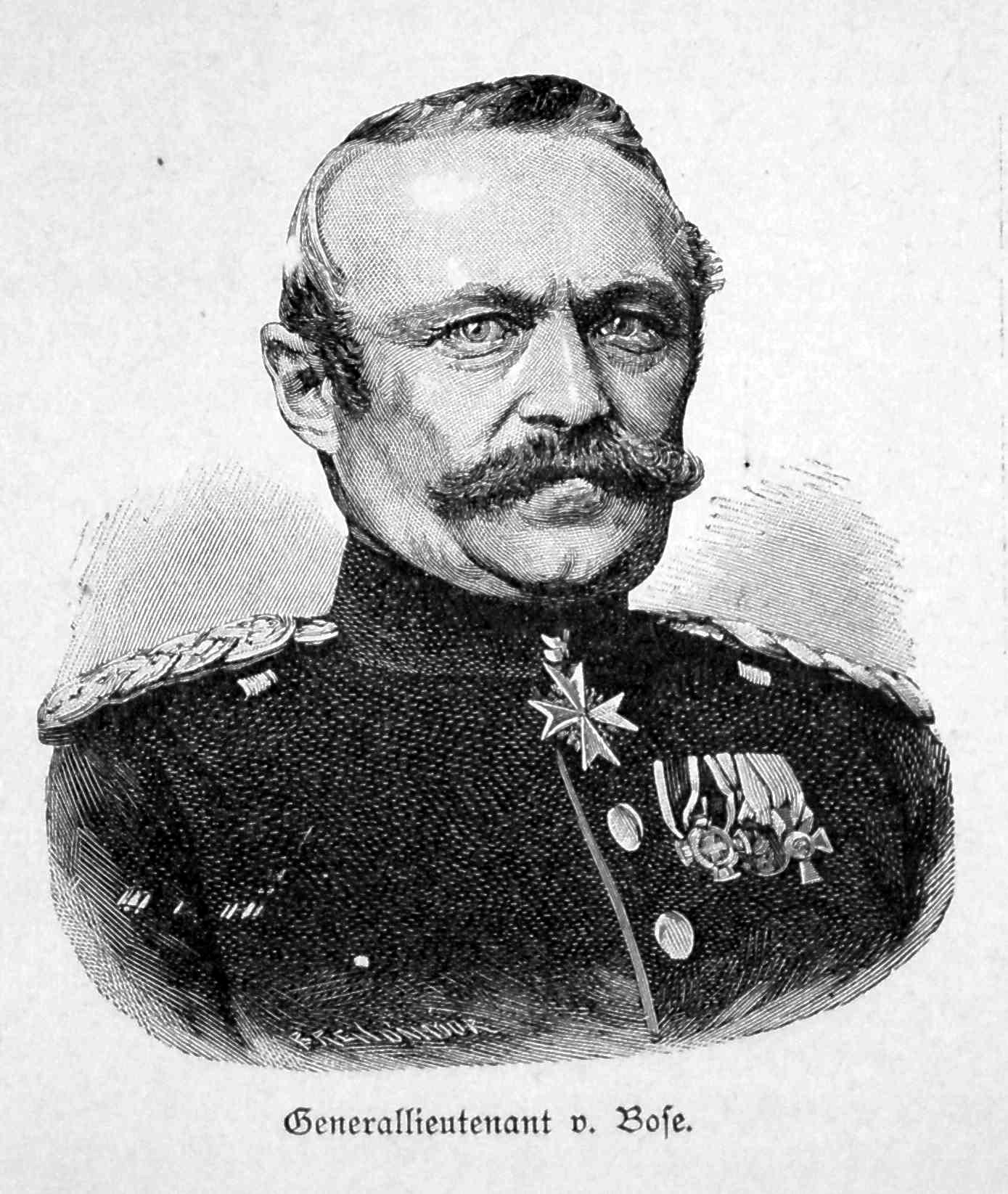
- Born: 12 September 1809; Sangerhausen
- Died: 22 July 1894 (aged 84); Hasserode
- Military career
- Allegiance: (Kingdom of Prussia) Prussia (German Empire) Imperial Germany
- Branch: Prussian Army
- Service years: 1826-?
- Rank: General of the Infantry
- Unit: 20th Infantry Division
- Commands: XI Corps
- Conflicts: Austro-Prussian War; • Battle of Podol; Franco-Prussian War
- Awards: Pour le Mérite; Order of the Black Eagle; Iron Cross 1st and 2nd Class

Friedrich Julius Wilhelm Graf von Bose (12 September 1809 – 22 July 1894) was a Prussian general who commanded the Prussian XI Corps during the Franco-Prussian War.

In 1821 Bose was a page boy at the court of Weimar. Bose entered the Prussian 26th Infantry Regiment in 1826. He became an officer in 1829. From 1832 to 1835 he studied at the Prussian Military Academy, which was a prerequisite to joining the General Staff. Bose served as an adjutant in various positions from 1835 to 1852. In 1853 he became a major on the General Staff. In 1858 Bose became chief of staff of the IV Corps. In 1860 he was promoted to colonel and given command of a regiment of infantry. A year later he was given a position in the Prussian war ministry.

Bose was promoted to major general in 1864. During the Austro-Prussian War Bose commanded the 15th Infantry Brigade, with which he distinguished himself at Podol, Münchengrätz and Sadowa. At the end of the war Bose was promoted to lieutenant-general and given command of the 20th Infantry Division. When the Franco-Prussian War started in August 1870, Bose was given command of the XI Corps, with which he served at the battle of Wörth where he was wounded. His wounds kept him out of the war until 1871.

For his services during the war he was given a donative of 100.000 thaler. In 1880 he was ennobled a count.

== Awards and decorations ==
- Kingdom of Prussia:
  - Knight of Honour of the Johanniter Order, 19 January 1854
  - Knight of the Royal Order of the Crown, 2nd Class, 22 September 1863
  - Pour le Mérite (military), 20 September 1866
  - Iron Cross (1870), 1st and 2nd Classes
  - Knight of the Order of the Red Eagle, 1st Class with Oak Leaves and Swords, 1871; Grand Cross with Swords on Ring, 12 September 1874
  - Knight of the Order of the Black Eagle, 5 October 1876; with Collar, 1878
  - Grand Commander's Cross of the Royal House Order of Hohenzollern, with Star, 24 September 1878
- Grand Duchy of Hesse: Grand Cross of the Merit Order of Philip the Magnanimous, 17 June 1873
- Württemberg:
  - Commander of the Order of the Württemberg Crown, 1863
  - Grand Cross of the Military Merit Order, 28 February 1871
- Austrian Empire:
  - Knight of the Imperial Order of the Iron Crown, 3rd Class, 15 June 1852
  - Knight of the Austrian Imperial Order of Leopold, 19 December 1863
- Russian Empire:
  - Knight of the Imperial Order of St. Anna, 2nd Class, 11 June 1864
  - Knight of the Imperial Order of St. Alexander Nevsky, 24 June 1875
- Sweden: Commander of the Royal Order of the Sword with Star
