= Battle of Santa Lucia =

1848 Battle in the First Italian War of Independence

- Part of the First Italian War of Independence
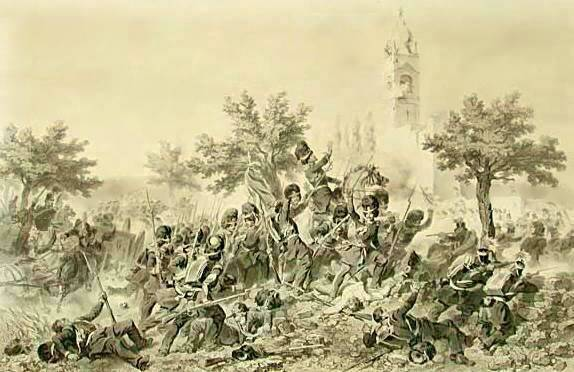
- Battle of Santa Lucia
Date	6 May 1848
Location	Santa Lucia, Verona, Lombardy-Venetia
Result	Austrian victory

Belligerents
Kingdom of Sardinia	Austrian Empire

Commanders and leaders
Carlo Alberto of Savoy	Josef Radetzky Crown Prince Franz Joseph

Strength
33,000 infantry 8,500 cavalry 82 cannon	33,000 infantry 9,000 cavalry 84 field artillery 192 fortification cannon

Casualties and losses
110 dead 776 wounded	72 dead 190 wounded 87 prisoners

The Battle of Santa Lucia, part of the First Italian War of Independence, was an engagement between Sardinian and Austrian forces in Verona, Italy. It was fought on 6 May 1848, when the King of Sardinia, Carlo Alberto, sent the I Corps of the Sardinian army to assault the fortified positions held before the walls of Verona by the Austrian army under field marshal Josef Radetzky. The Austrian army, though outnumbered, managed to withstand the attack and hold their positions. The battle is named after the Santa Lucia district of Verona. Franz Joseph (then only 17 years old) assisted in the battle.

== Background ==
=== Scope of hostilities ===
On 18 March 1848, the city of Milan began an insurrection against the Austrian Empire known later as the Five Days of Milan. The commander of the Lombard–Venetian army, field marshal Josef Radetzky, was unsure how to quell it and was forced to abandon the fierce fighting of the city. At the same time, the garrisons of Como and several other cities in Lombardy–Venetia defected to the insurgents.

=== Austrian strategic weakness ===
==== Radetzky's impasse ====
Assembled inside Verona there was still a considerable force, protected by valid fortifications: however, Austrian troops were demotivated after the first defeats (excepting the victory of 11 April over ill-equipped Lombard volunteers nearly Castelnuovo Castelnuovo del Garda, followed by the killings of nearly 113 civilians). In addition, the possibility of receiving help from General Nugent's troops through Isonzo was barricaded by the presence of Italian rebels in Palmanova, Osoppo and Venice. To make Radetzky situation even worse, political situation after repression of Austrian Revolution led many observers to doubt about the field-marshal's capacity in maintaining order, and he was labeled as a conservative monarchist by public liberal opinion.

==== Advance ====
Advance begins on 6 May, hampered by Sardinians' little knowledge of territory, and only the central column reached enemy (while on right, Bava divisions lost contact with the rest of Sardinian army).
