= Václav Jan Sekera =

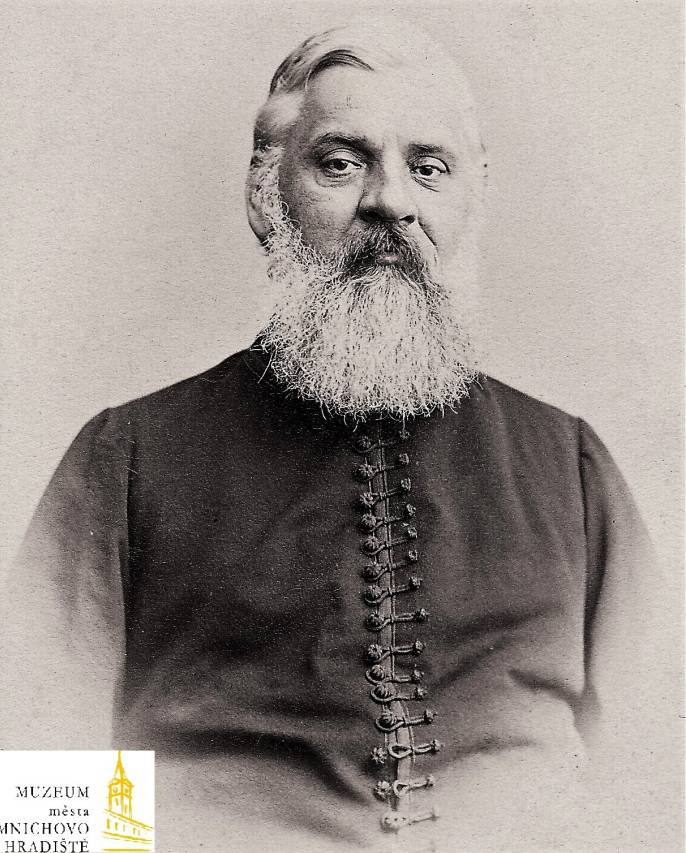

Václav Jan Sekera (German: Wenzel Johann Sekera; 13 June 1815 – 21 April 1875) was a Czech naturalist and pharmacist. For his botanical work, he was awarded an honorary doctorate by the Jagiellonian University.

== Life and work ==
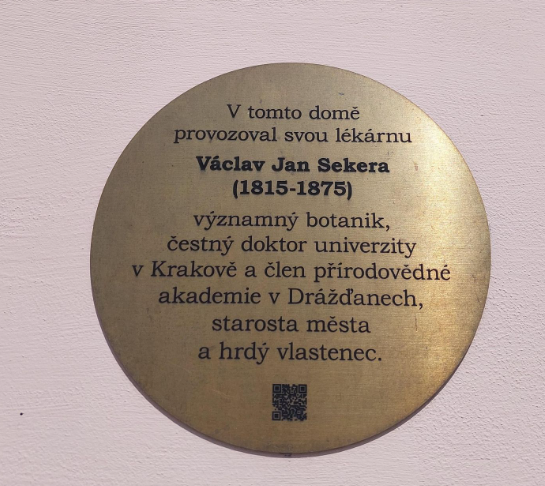
Memorial plaque at his home

Sekera was born in Mnichovo Hradiště (German: Münchengrätz) in Bohemia, Austrian Empire, the son of Václav, a draper who later became an innkeeper. His mother Karolína, née Michálková, came from a brewer family. He studied at the Mladá Boleslav gymnasium before becoming a pharmacist's apprentice in 1828 under his uncle Václav Vejrich who had an interest in botany. In 1836 he went to the University of Prague and studied pharmacy and natural history under Jan Svatopluk Presl and Kostelecký. He began to go on botanical excursions with Anton Fierlinger and P. M. Opiz. In 1838 he inherited his uncle's pharmacy in Mnichovo Hradiště from 1839 while also continuing his pursuit of natural history studies. He collected plants, insects and minerals from the region. He was the author of a manuscript titled Repertorium florae Bohemicae and was in correspondence with many local naturalists including Presl, Jan Evangelista Purkyně and Philipp Maximilian Opiz. He described and named a species of plant as Lychnis preslii after his teacher Presl, but this is now a synonym for Silene dioica. In 1860 he set up a shop selling books and artworks. In 1868–1869, he was mayor of his town. He moved his pharmacy in 1875 and called it the U Zlatého lva (lit. 'At the Golden Lion') which was a landmark for century. He married Anna Kittlová and they had five daughters and a son. After his death, his herbarium was described by Václav Mráček who was married to his eldest daughter Marie. His herbarium is held in the national museum.
