= Santa Lucia (Verona) =

Coordinates: 45°25′20″N 10°57′07″E

Santa Lucia was an ancient paesino next to Verona (its parish is still called Santa Lucia extra, since it is positioned outside the ancient town wall). Today it has been absorbed into Verona, located to the south-west of the city centre, forming part of the Circoscrizione 4 of the Commune of Verona.

== History ==
It was the location for a hard-fought battle (the Battle of Santa Lucia) during the First Italian War of Independence between Piedmontese and Austrian troops, hidden in the parish cemetery and of the Gisella fort, positioned between Verona and the district of Dossobuono.

In the 1950s this district and that of Golosine were the subject of rapid urbanisation, uniting it to the city thanks to the construction of numerous popular residential houses, whose offshoots extended as far as the industrial, food, customs and agriculture zones.
