= Mnichovo Hradiště =

- Town
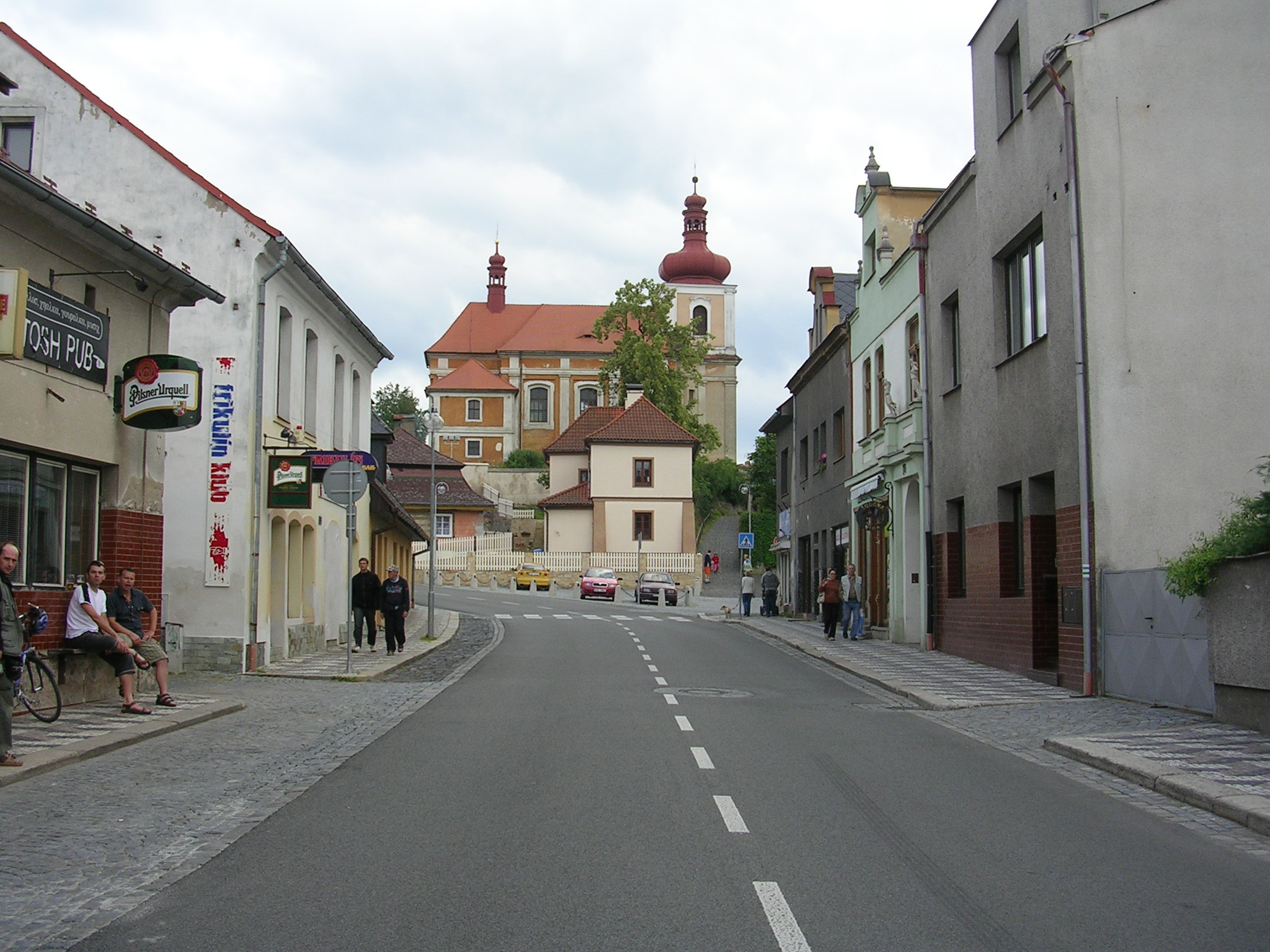
- 1. máje Street in the town centre

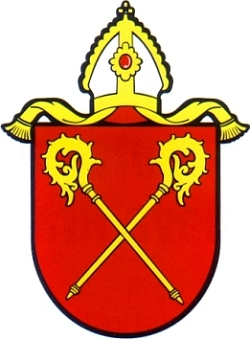
- Flag Coat of arms

- Location in the Czech Republic
- Coordinates: 50°31′17″N 14°58′25″E
- Country: Czech Republic
- Region: Central Bohemian
- District: Mladá Boleslav
- First mentioned: 1279

Government
  - Mayor: Jiří Plíhal

Area
  - Total: 34.31 km^{2} (13.25 sq mi)
- Elevation: 240 m (790 ft)

Population (2026-01-01)
  - Total: 9,123
  - Density: 265.9/km^{2} (688.7/sq mi)
- Time zone: UTC+1 (CET)
  - Summer (DST): UTC+2 (CEST)
- Postal codes: 294 11, 294 13, 295 01
- Website: www.mnhradiste.cz

Mnichovo Hradiště (Czech pronunciation: [ˈmɲɪxovo ˈɦraɟɪʃcɛ]; German: Münchengrätz) is a town in Mladá Boleslav District in the Central Bohemian Region of the Czech Republic. It has about 9,100 inhabitants. The town is located in the Jičín Uplands on the left bank of the Jizera River.

Mnichovo Hradiště was founded in the 13th century by the Cistercian monks. The history of Mnichovo Hradiště is connected primarily with the Waldstein family, who have owned it continuously since 1621. The historic town centre is well preserved and is protected as an urban monument zone. The main landmark of the town is the Mnichovo Hradiště Castle, protected as a national cultural monument.

== Administrative division ==
Mnichovo Hradiště consists of 12 municipal parts (in brackets population according to the 2021 census):

- Mnichovo Hradiště (6,361)
- Dneboh (264)
- Dobrá Voda (56)
- Hněvousice (597)
- Hoškovice (112)
- Hradec (22)
- Kruhy (74)
- Lhotice (149)
- Olšina (194)
- Podolí (116)
- Sychrov (125)
- Veselá (667)

== Etymology ==
The town was initially named Hradiště (i.e. 'gord'), after the monastery of the monks who founded the town. Later the town was called Hradiště nad Jizerou and Hradiště Mnichové. From the 19th century, the town is called Mnichovo Hradiště ("monk's gord").

== Geography ==
Mnichovo Hradiště is located about 12 kilometres (7 mi) north of Mladá Boleslav and 26 km (16 mi) south of Liberec. It lies in the Jičín Uplands. The highest point is at 406 m (1,332 ft) above sea level. The town is situated on the left bank of the Jizera River, which forms the western municipal border. The streams Veselka and Nedbalka, tributaries of the Jizera, flow through the town.

== History ==
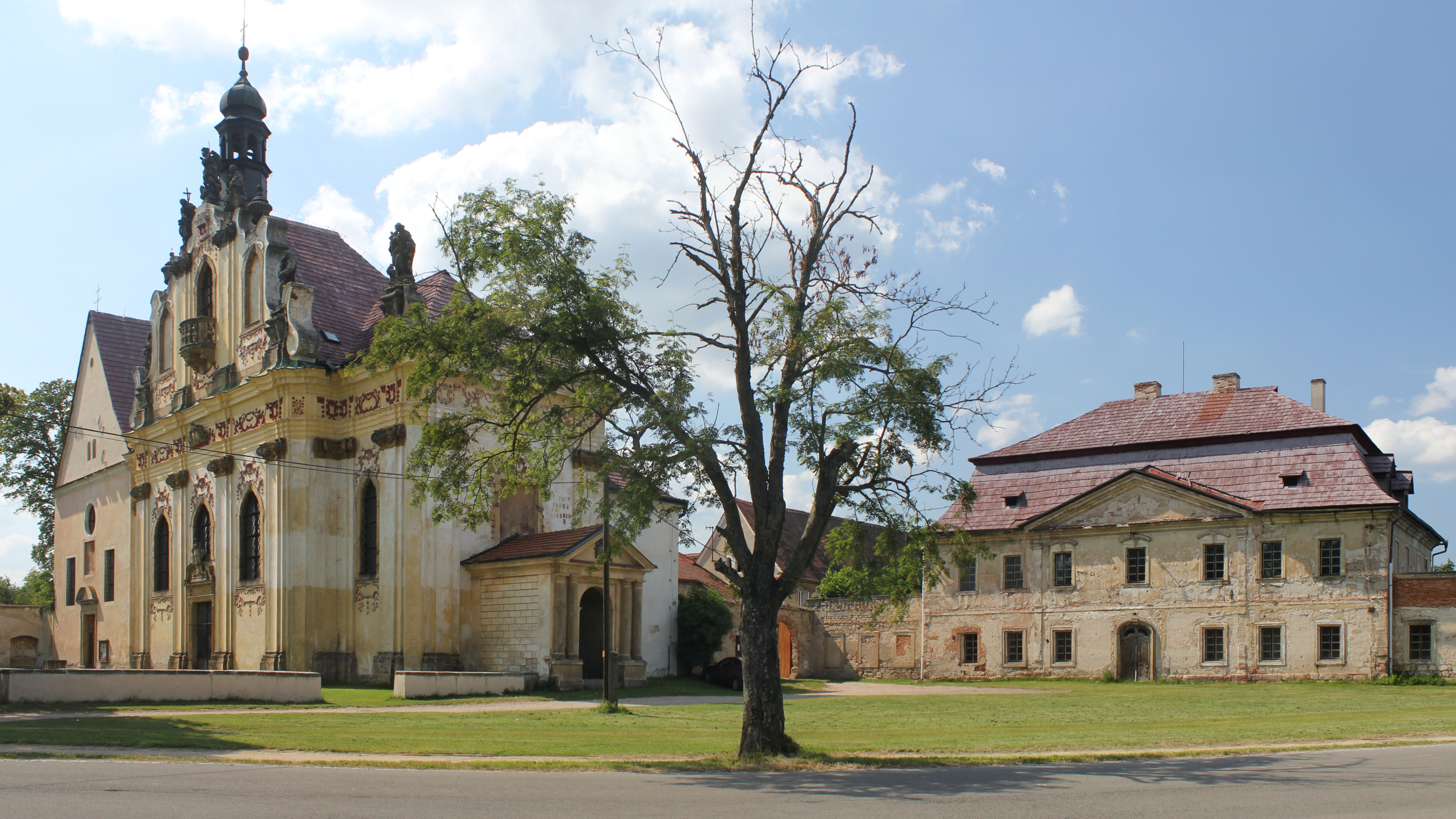
Former Capuchin monastery

The first written mention of Hradiště is from 1279. It was founded by monks from the nearby Cistercian monastery in Klášter Hradiště nad Jizerou. The monastery owned the town until 1420, when both the monastery and the town were burned down by the Orebites. After the Hussite Wars, properties of the monastery were divided among various noble families. Since then, the owners of Hradiště have often changed. The owners included Jan Čapek of Sány, Mikuláš Berka of Dubá, Old Town of Prague and Jan of Vartenberk.

From the end of the 16th century, the town was owned by the Budovec of Budov family. Václav Budovec of Budov was executed in 1621. After his death, the Hradiště estate was acquired by Albrecht von Wallenstein, who soon gave it to his relative Maxmilián of Waldstein. At the end of the 17th century, Hradiště became the centre of an extensive estate. In the 18th century, the town developed rapidly. New houses and representative buildings were built, culture and education were supported and a Jewish community was established. The Waldstein family owned the estate until 1945.

On 28 June 1866, during the Austro-Prussian War, the Battle of Münchengrätz took place near the town. The royal Prussian forces were victorious over the Austrian Empire.

Until 1918 the town was part of Austria-Hungary and was the centre of a district, which was one of the 94 Bezirkshauptmannschaften in Bohemia.

== Demographics ==
Historical population

Year	Pop.	±%
1869	5,493	—
1880	6,042	+10.0%
1890	5,918	−2.1%
1900	6,080	+2.7%
1910	6,372	+4.8%

Year	Pop.	±%
1921	6,393	+0.3%
1930	6,424	+0.5%
1950	5,733	−10.8%
1961	6,706	+17.0%
1970	6,920	+3.2%

Year	Pop.	±%
1980	8,009	+15.7%
1991	8,435	+5.3%
2001	8,393	−0.5%
2011	8,245	−1.8%
2021	8,737	+6.0%

Source: Censuses

== Economy ==
Mnichovo Hradiště has a factory of the Czech beverage company Kofola, which produces here the cola-based drink Kofola and several other products.

== Transport ==
The D10 motorway from Prague to Turnov runs next to the town.

Mnichovo Hradiště is located on the railway line Prague–Turnov.

== Sights ==
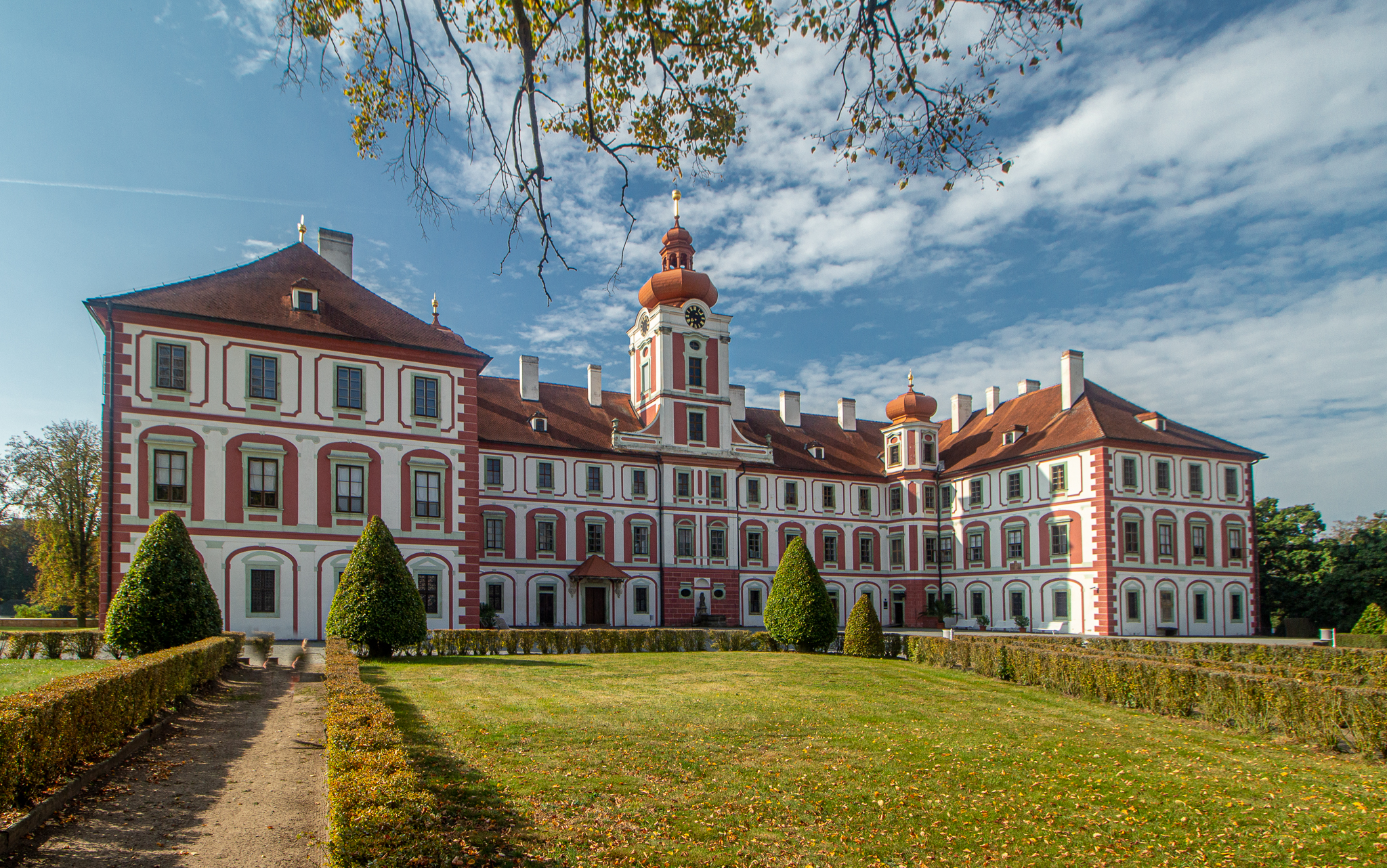
Mnichovo Hradiště Castle

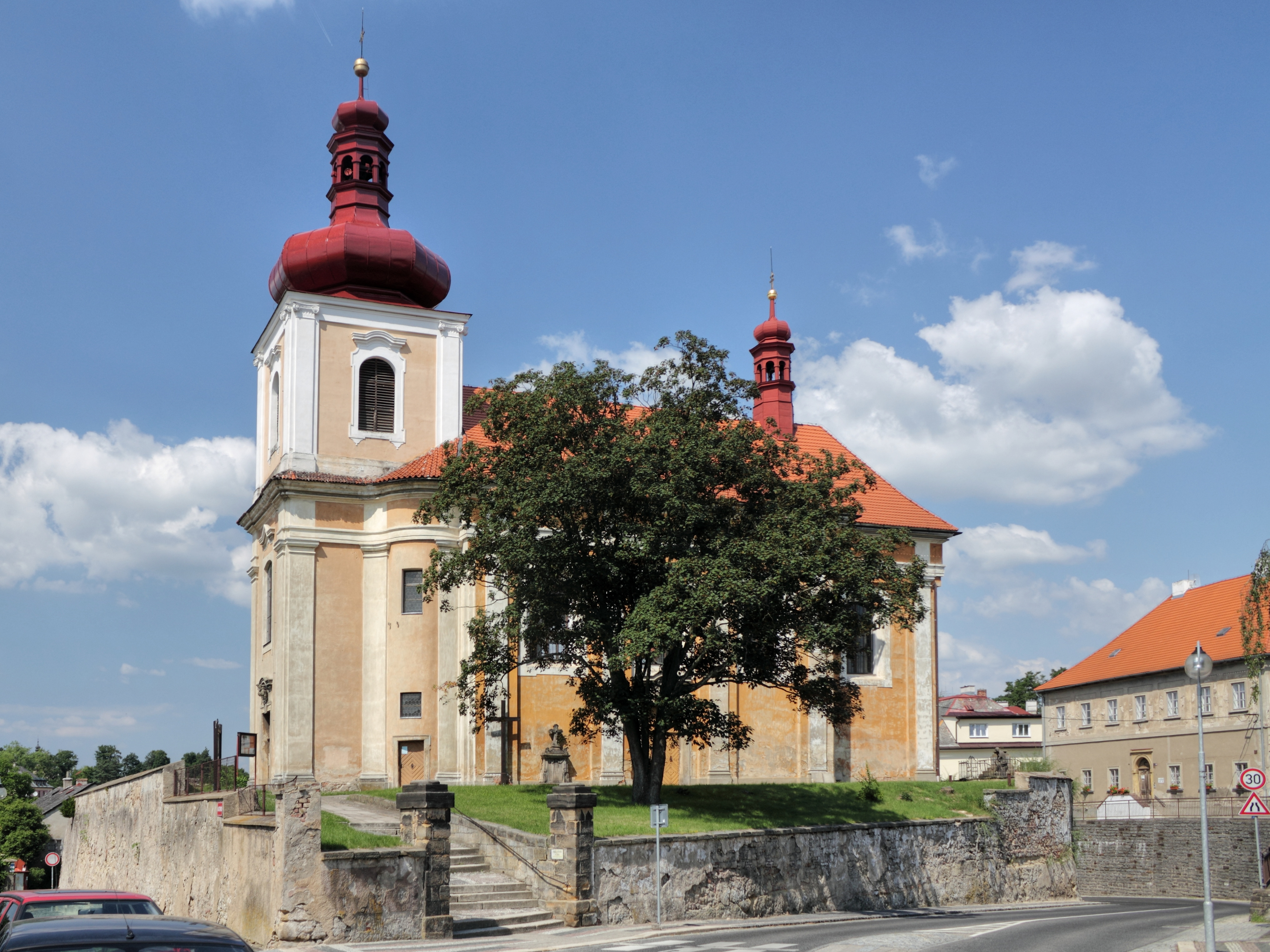
Church of Saint James the Great

The main landmark of the town is Mnichovo Hradiště Castle. The original Gothic fortress was rebuilt into a Renaissance residence in 1606 by Václav Budovec of Budov. In 1945, it was confiscated by the state. Today the castle is still owned by the state and is open to the public. It is protected as a national cultural monument.

The castle is connected to the Baroque complex of the Capuchin monastery from the 1690s, founded by the Waldsteins. The complex include the Church of the Holy Three Kings, the convent and the burial chapel of the Waldsteins. The remains of Albrecht von Wallenstein were moved from Jičín to the chapel in 1723.

The Church of Saint James the Great is among the most valuable buildings of the town. It was built in the Baroque style in 1726–1727.

== Notable people ==
- Adam Zalužanský of Zalužany (c. 1555–1613), botanist and physician
- Václav Jan Sekera (1815–1875), naturalist and botanist
- Leopold Kompert (1822–1886), writer
- Jan Šverma (1901–1944), journalist, communist activist and resistance fighter
- Jiří Tancibudek (1921–2004), Czech-Australian oboist

== Twin towns – sister cities ==
Mnichovo Hradiště is twinned with:

- Chojnów, Poland
- Erzhausen, Germany
- Figline e Incisa Valdarno, Italy
