= Battle of Hühnerwasser =

First battle of the Austro-Prussian War

Coordinates: 50.586029°N 14.8041556°E

- Part of the Austro-Prussian War
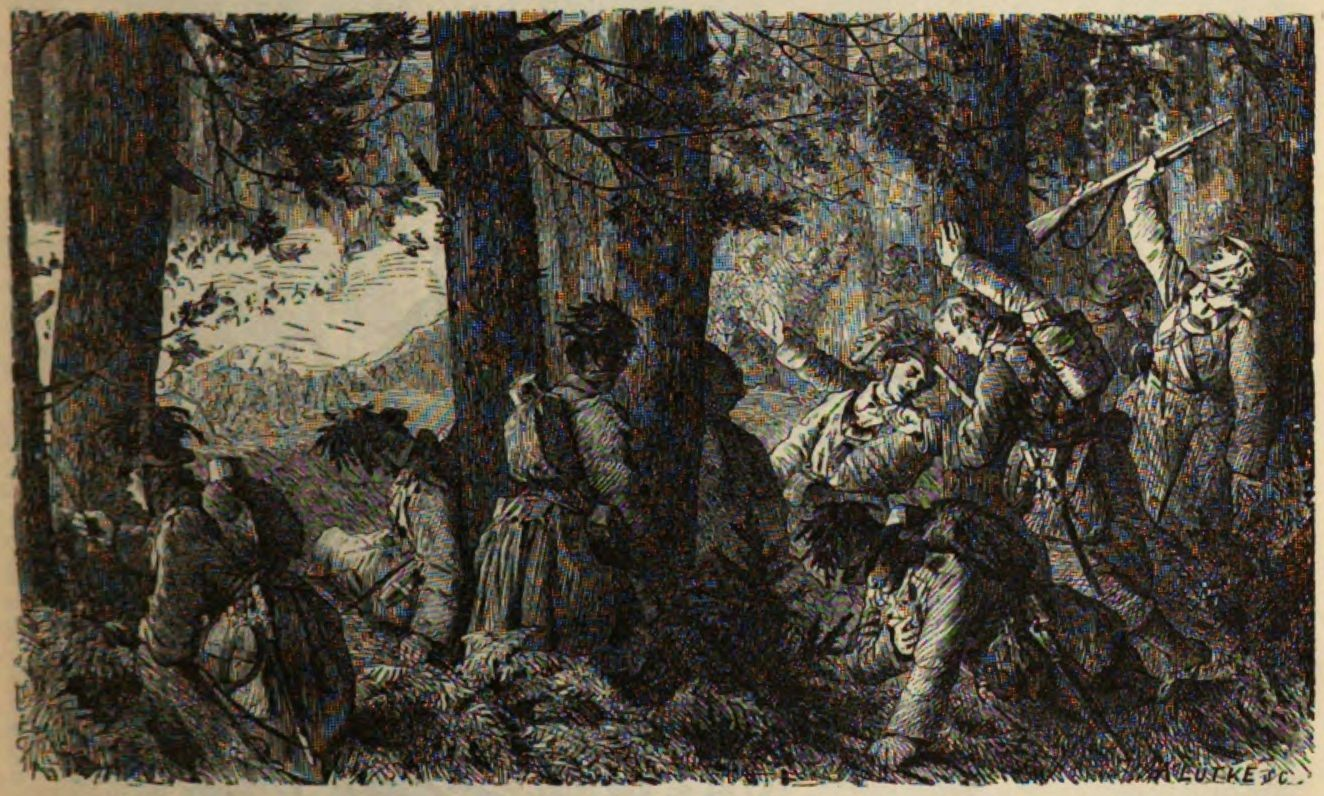
- Forest fighting near Hühnerwasser (illustration by L. Burger, 1871)
Date	26 June 1866
Location	Hühnerwasser, Bohemia
Result	Prussian victory

Belligerents
Prussia	Austria

Commanders and leaders
(Kingdom of Prussia) Karl Eberhard Herwarth von Bittenfeld (Kingdom of Prussia) Alexander von Schoeler	(Austrian Empire) Leopold Gondrecourt

Strength
1 brigade	1 brigade

Casualties and losses
7 killed 43 wounded	277 killed, wounded or captured

The Battle of Hühnerwasser (Kuřívody) was the first battle of the Austro-Prussian War. It was the first engagement in the opening days of the Königgrätz campaign, fought in Bohemia on 26 June 1866. It was fought between troops of the Prussian Elbe army under General Herwarth von Bittenfeld and troops from the Austrian I Corps, led by Leopold Gondrecourt.

Gondrecourt ordered troops from Count Leiningen's brigade – a battalion of Slovak jäger and a battalion of Hungarian line infantry – to attack the Prussian outposts at Hühnerwasser and throw them back across the Iser. The attacking cavalry first made contact with an advanced Prussian post stationed between the trees, which alarmed the rest of Prussian general von Schöler's brigade, that consisted of four infantry battalions, one Jäger battalion, five squadrons and 12 guns. The superior firepower of the Prussian Dreyse needle guns stopped the Austrian attacks. Gondrecourt then recalled his troops and retreated towards Münchengrätz (Mnichovo Hradiště). Prussian captain pursued the retreating Austrians. Near the Hühnerwasser town a concealed squadron of Nicolaus Hussars counterattacked the advancing Prussian detachment, which suffered substantial losses.

Only after securing the woods around noon, General Schöler was able to support the advanced troops at Hühnerwasser and defeated the Austrian Haugwitz battalion, which subsequently retreated. Prussian commander Herwarth arrived at the battlefield around 1.00 pm and organized the consolidation of the area. Austrian losses amounted to 277, while the Prussians lost one officer and six men killed, as well as 3 officers and 40 men wounded.

== Bibliography ==
- Barry, Q. (2009). The Road to Königgrätz: Helmuth von Moltke and the Austro-Prussian War 1866. Solihull: Helion. ISBN 978-1-906033-37-8.
- Prussian General Staff (1872). The Campaign of 1866 in Germany. Translated by Colonel von Wright; Henry M. Hozier. London: Clowes & Sons.
- Geoffrey Wawro, The Austro-Prussian War. Austria's war with Prussia and Italy in 1866 (New York 2007), p. 129-130.
