= Battle of Münchengrätz =

1866 battle of the Austro-Prussian War

Coordinates: 50°31′17″N 14°58′25″E

- Part of Austro-Prussian War
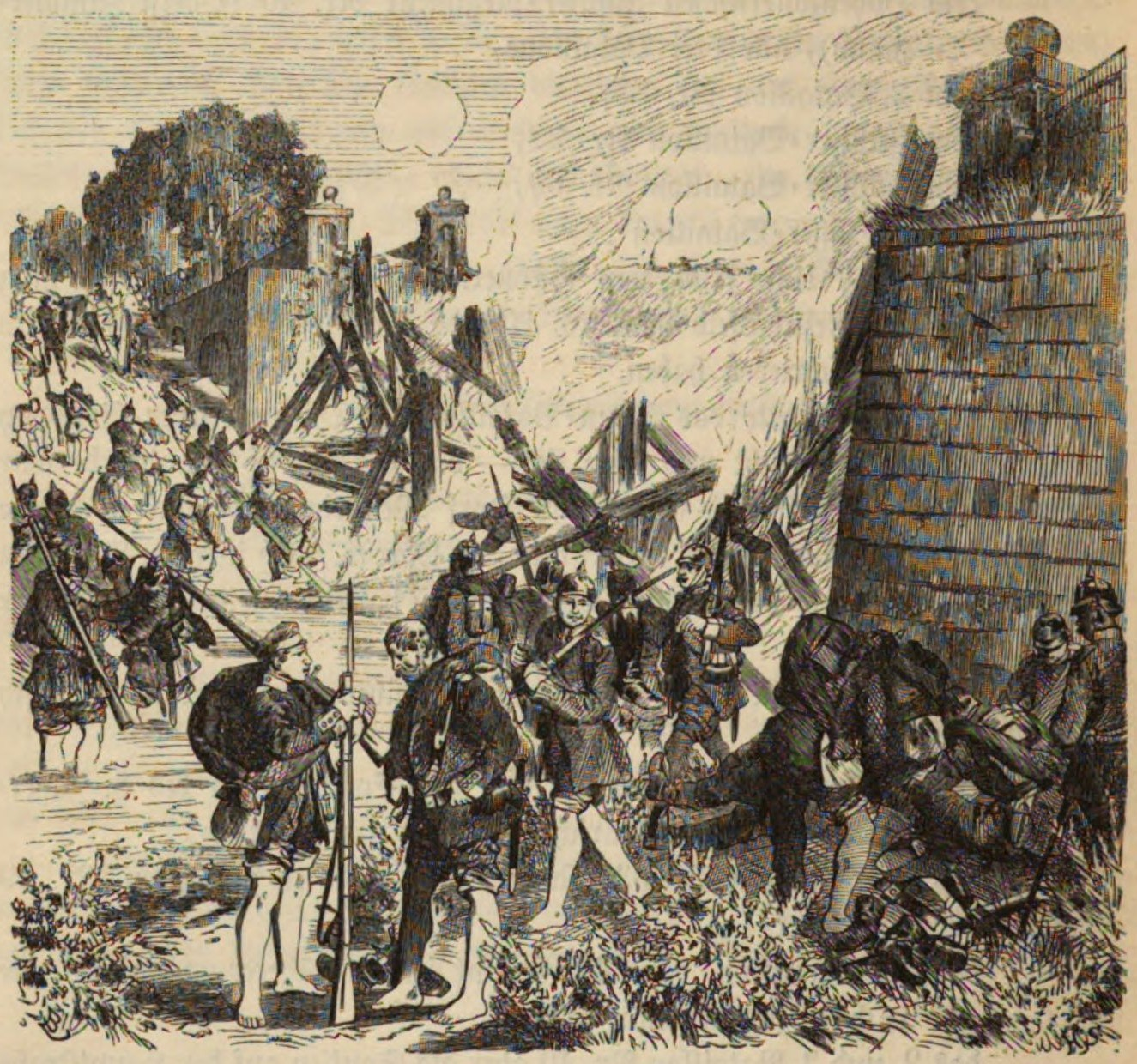
- Prussians crossing Iser at Münchengrätz, 28 June 1866 (illustration by L. Burger, 1871)
Date	28 June 1866
Location	Mnichovo Hradiště, Bohemia (modern day Czech Republic)
Result	Prussian victory

Belligerents
(Kingdom of Prussia) Prussia	(Austrian Empire) Austria

Commanders and leaders
Prince Frederick Charles; Karl Eberhard von Bittenfeld	Eduard Clam-Gallas

Strength
14,000; 18 guns	20,000

Casualties and losses
46 killed 279 wounded 16 captured	3,000 (estimated)

The Battle of Münchengrätz (German: Schlacht bei Münchengrätz) or Battle of Mnichovo Hradiště (Czech: Bitva u Mnichova Hradiště) was fought near Mnichovo Hradiště, modern day Czech Republic, on 28 June 1866 during the Austro-Prussian War. It ended in a Prussian victory over the Austrian Empire.

The site also previously held 1833 summit meeting Munichgrätz Conference.

== Events ==
Having lost the engagements at Hühnerwasser and Podol, and with the Prussian Elbe Army and 1st Army bearing in on them from the west and the north, Clam-Gallas and his ally, Prince Albert of Saxony, decided to have the Iser Army abandon its exposed position near Mnichovo Hradiště. While three Austrian brigades, under Count Leiningen, remained to slow the Prussian pursuit, Clam-Gallas sent Ringelsheims's and Poschacher's brigades east towards Jičín, while the five Saxon brigades marched south to Jungbunzlau. Leiningen deployed his Jäger units in town and posted the line regiments from his own brigade across the Jizera river in Klaster, Piret's brigade deployed on Musky Hill, and Abele's brigade drew up in battalion columns on the road from Podol.

The Prussian 31st Brigade, part of the Elbe Army, started the battle and attacked Klaster making the 38th Austrian Regiment, consisting out of Venetians, to rapidly abandon their position on the hill. In the north, Prince Frederick Charles attacked the north side of Musky Hill with his Prussian 8th Division, under Horn, where they encountered Piret and Abele, while the Prussian 7th Division, under Fransecky, marched through the morass behind the heights to cut the Austrian communication lines to Mnichovo Hradiště and Jičín. Seeing the danger of being encircled, Leiningen ordered his brigade to withdraw from the town. The Prussians of the Elbe Army then occupied the town and, being thirsty and hungry from the long march, abandoned formation to sack the town and drink at the local brewery.

Abele's brigade held long enough on the slopes of the hill for Leiningen and Piret to untangle and the Austrian brigades escaped to the east, leaving some 3,000 men in killed, wounded and prisoners. The Prussians, having only engaged with 14 battalions, only lost about 300 men, but managed to link up their two armies and drive the Austrians and their Saxon allies out of their Iser line.
