= Delville Wood order of battle =

Battle of Delville Wood
- Part of the Battle of the Somme in the First World War
Date	14 July – 15 September 1916
Location	Delville Wood, Longueval, the Somme, France 50.0278°N 2.8099°E
Result	British victory

Belligerents
British Empire; South Africa; United Kingdom	German Empire

Commanders and leaders
Douglas Haig; Henry Rawlinson	Fritz von Below; Max von Gallwitz

Strength
9 divisions; 1 brigade	
- Only brigades and battalions that participated in the actions associated with the Battle of Delville Wood are shown. For details on the full organisation, see Order of battle for the Battle of the Somme.

The Battle of Delville Wood was fought from 14 July to 3 September 1916, one of the twelve battles of the Somme in 1916. It was fought by the British and French against the army of the German Empire in the Somme River valley in northern France. The battle was the début of the 1st South African Brigade (part of the 9th (Scottish) Division) on the Western Front, which captured Delville Wood and held it from 15 to 19 July. The casualties of the brigade were similar to those of many British brigades on First day on the Somme (1 July 1916).

Delville Wood is well preserved with the remains of trenches, a museum and monument to the 1st South African Brigade. After the relief of the South Africans the battle for the wood continued until the end of August, when the last German footholds were captured by the 43rd Brigade of the 14th (Light) Division on 27 August. A large German counter-attack on 31 August regained part of the north edge of the wood until British attacks from 4 to 8 September, which secured the wood until the battles of 1918.

== Orders of Battle ==
=== British and Dominion forces ===
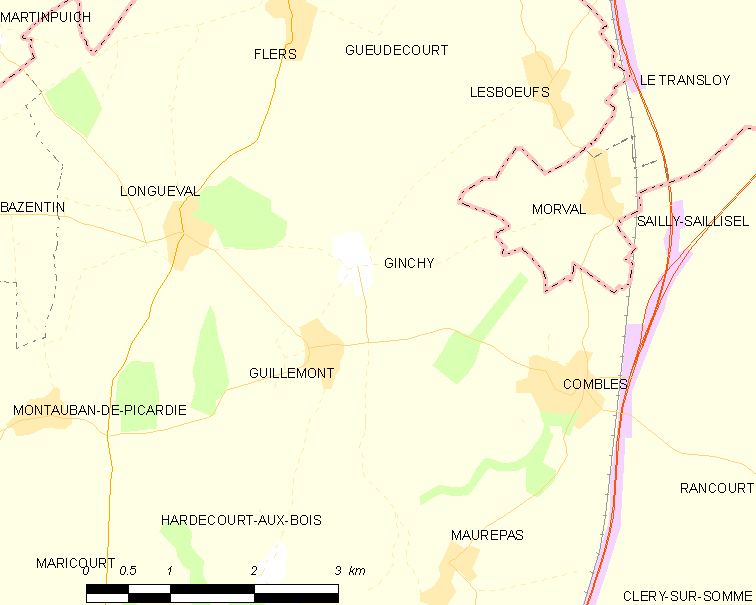
Map of the Longueval and Delville Wood area (commune FR insee code 80378)

Order of battle for actions associated with the capture of Trônes Wood: 14–15 July 1916.

(United Kingdom) 14th (Light) Division 14–15 July 1916
Commander: Major-General V. A. Couper
Infantry:	41st Brigade	7th Battalion, King's Royal Rifle Corps
Infantry:	41st Brigade	8th Battalion, King's Royal Rifle Corps
Infantry:	41st Brigade	7th Battalion, Rifle Brigade
Infantry:	41st Brigade	8th Battalion, Rifle Brigade
Infantry:	42nd Brigade	5th Battalion, Oxfordshire and Buckinghamshire Light Infantry
Infantry:	42nd Brigade	5th Battalion, King's Shropshire Light Infantry
Infantry:	42nd Brigade	9th Battalion, King's Royal Rifle Corps
Infantry:	42nd Brigade	9th Battalion, Rifle Brigade
Infantry:	43rd Brigade	6th Battalion, Somerset Light Infantry Regiment
Infantry:	43rd Brigade	6th Battalion, Duke of Cornwall's Light Infantry
Infantry:	43rd Brigade	6th Battalion, King's Own Yorkshire Light Infantry
Infantry:	43rd Brigade	10th Battalion, Durham Light Infantry Regiment
Engineers and Support:	11th Battalion, King's Regiment (Pioneers)	

(United Kingdom) 18th (Eastern) Division 14–15 July 1916
Commander: Major General I. Maxse
Infantry:	53rd Brigade	8th Battalion, Norfolk Regiment
Infantry:	53rd Brigade	8th Battalion, Suffolk Regiment
Infantry:	53rd Brigade	10th Battalion, Essex Regiment
Infantry:	53rd Brigade	6th Battalion, Royal Berkshire Regiment
Infantry:	54th Brigade	11th Battalion, Royal Fusiliers
Infantry:	54th Brigade	7th Battalion, Bedfordshire Regiment
Infantry:	54th Brigade	8th Battalion, Northamptonshire Regiment
Infantry:	54th Brigade	12th Battalion, Middlesex Regiment
Infantry:	55th Brigade	7th Battalion, Queen's Regiment
Infantry:	55th Brigade	7th Battalion, Buffs (Royal East Kent Regiment)
Infantry:	55th Brigade	8th Battalion, East Surrey Regiment
Infantry:	55th Brigade	7th Battalion, Royal West Kent Regiment
Engineers and Support:	8th Battalion, Royal Sussex Regiment	

Order of battle for actions associated with the capture of Longueval: 14–17 July 1916.

(United Kingdom) 3rd Division
Commander: Major-General J. A. Haldane then Major-General C. J. Deverell
Infantry:	8th Brigade	2nd Battalion, Royal Scots
Infantry:	8th Brigade	8th Battalion, East Yorkshire Regiment
Infantry:	8th Brigade	7th Battalion, King's Shropshire Light Infantry
Infantry:	8th Brigade	1st Battalion, Royal Scots Fusiliers
Infantry:	9th Brigade	1st Battalion, Northumberland Fusiliers
Infantry:	9th Brigade	4th Battalion, Royal Fusiliers
Infantry:	9th Brigade	13th Battalion, King’s Regiment
Infantry:	9th Brigade	12th Battalion, West Yorkshire Regiment
Infantry:	76th Brigade	8th Battalion, The King's Own (Royal Lancaster Regiment)
Infantry:	76th Brigade	2nd Battalion, Suffolk Regiment
Infantry:	76th Brigade	10th Battalion, Royal Welsh Regiment
Infantry:	76th Brigade	1st Battalion, Gordon Highlanders
Engineers and Support:	20th Battalion, King's Royal Rifle Corps	

9th (Scottish) Division
Commander: Major-General W. T. Furse
Infantry:	(United Kingdom) 26th Brigade	8th Battalion, Black Watch
Infantry:	(United Kingdom) 26th Brigade	7th Battalion, Seaforth Highlanders
Infantry:	(United Kingdom) 26th Brigade	5th Battalion, Queen's Own Cameron Highlanders
Infantry:	(United Kingdom) 26th Brigade	10th Battalion, Argyll & Sutherland Highlanders
Infantry:	(United Kingdom) 27th Brigade	11th Battalion, Royal Scots
Infantry:	(United Kingdom) 27th Brigade	12th Battalion, Royal Scots
Infantry:	(United Kingdom) 27th Brigade	6th Battalion, King's Own Scottish Borderers
Infantry:	(United Kingdom) 27th Brigade	9th Battalion, Cameronians (Scottish Rifles)
Infantry:	(South Africa) South African Brigade; Major-General Sir Henry Lukin KCB CMG DSO	1st South African Battalion (Cape)
Infantry:	(South Africa) South African Brigade; Major-General Sir Henry Lukin KCB CMG DSO	4th South African Battalion (Scottish)
Engineers and Support:	9th Battalion, Seaforth Highlanders (Pioneers)	

Order of battle for actions associated with the first capture of Delville Wood: 14 July – 3 September 1916

(United Kingdom) 2nd Division 27 July – 4 August 1916
Commander: Major General C. Monro
Infantry:	99th Brigade	22nd Battalion, Royal Fusiliers
Infantry:	99th Brigade	23rd Battalion, Royal Fusiliers
Infantry:	99th Brigade	1st Battalion, Royal Berkshire Regiment
Infantry:	99th Brigade	1st Battalion, King's Royal Rifle Corps
Engineers and Support:	10th Battalion, Duke of Cornwall's Light Infantry (Pioneers)	

(United Kingdom) 3rd Division 17–22 July 1916
Commander: Major-General J. A. Haldane then Major-General C. J. Deverell
Infantry:	76th Brigade	8th Battalion, The King's Own (Royal Lancaster Regiment)
Infantry:	76th Brigade	2nd Battalion, Suffolk Regiment
Infantry:	76th Brigade	10th Battalion, Royal Welsh Regiment
Infantry:	76th Brigade	1st Battalion, Gordon Highlanders
Engineers and Support:	20th Battalion, King's Royal Rifle Corps	

9th (Scottish) Division 14–22 July 1916
Commander: Major-General W. T. Furse
Infantry:	(United Kingdom) 26th Brigade	8th Battalion, Black Watch
Infantry:	(United Kingdom) 26th Brigade	7th Battalion, Seaforth Highlanders
Infantry:	(United Kingdom) 26th Brigade	5th Battalion, Queens Own Cameron Highlanders
Infantry:	(United Kingdom) 26th Brigade	10th Battalion, Argyll & Sutherland Highlanders
Infantry:	(United Kingdom) 27th Brigade	11th Battalion, Royal Scots
Infantry:	(United Kingdom) 27th Brigade	12th Battalion, Royal Scots
Infantry:	(United Kingdom) 27th Brigade	6th Battalion, King's Own Scottish Borderers
Infantry:	(United Kingdom) 27th Brigade	9th Battalion, Cameronians (Scottish Rifles)
Infantry:	(South Africa) South African Brigade; Major-General Sir Henry Timson Lukin KCB CMG DSO	1st South African Battalion (Cape)
Infantry:	(South Africa) South African Brigade; Major-General Sir Henry Timson Lukin KCB CMG DSO	2nd South African Battalion (Natal & OFS)
Infantry:	(South Africa) South African Brigade; Major-General Sir Henry Timson Lukin KCB CMG DSO	3rd South African Battalion (Transvaal & Rhodesia)
Infantry:	(South Africa) South African Brigade; Major-General Sir Henry Timson Lukin KCB CMG DSO	4th South African Battalion (Scottish)
Engineers and Support:	9th Battalion, Seaforth Highlanders (Pioneers)	

(United Kingdom) 17th (Northern) Division 4–11 August 1916
Commander: Major-General P. R. Robertson
Infantry:	50th Brigade	10th Battalion, West Yorkshire Regiment
Infantry:	50th Brigade	7th Battalion, East Yorkshire Regiment
Infantry:	50th Brigade	7th Battalion, Green Howards Regiment
Infantry:	50th Brigade	6th Battalion, Dorset Regiment
Infantry:	51st Brigade	7th Battalion, Royal Lincolnshire Regiment
Infantry:	51st Brigade	7th Battalion, Border Regiment
Infantry:	51st Brigade	8th Battalion, South Staffordshire Regiment
Infantry:	51st Brigade	10th Battalion, Sherwood Foresters Regiment
Infantry:	52nd Brigade	9th Battalion, Northumberland Fusiliers
Infantry:	52nd Brigade	10th Battalion, Lancashire Fusiliers
Infantry:	52nd Brigade	9th Battalion, Duke of Wellington's Regiment
Infantry:	52nd Brigade	12th Battalion, Manchester Regiment
Engineers and Support:	7th Battalion, York and Lancaster Regiment	

(United Kingdom) 20th (Light) Division 11 August – 3 September 1916
Commander: Major-General W. Douglas Smith
Infantry:	61st Brigade	7th Battalion, Somerset Light Infantry Regiment
Infantry:	61st Brigade	7th Battalion, Duke of Cornwall's Light Infantry Regiment
Infantry:	61st Brigade	7th Battalion, King's Own Yorkshire Light Infantry
Infantry:	61st Brigade	12th Battalion, King's Regiment
Engineers and Support:	11th Battalion, Durham Light Infantry Regiment	

(United Kingdom) 24th Division 30 August – 3 September 1916
Commander: Major-General J. E. Capper
Infantry:	72nd Brigade	8th Battalion, Queen's Regiment
Infantry:	72nd Brigade	9th Battalion, East Surrey Regiment
Infantry:	72nd Brigade	8th Battalion, Royal West Kent Regiment
Infantry:	72nd Brigade	1st Battalion, North Staffordshire Regiment
Infantry:	73rd Brigade	9th Battalion, Royal Sussex Regiment
Infantry:	73rd Brigade	7th Battalion, Northamptonshire Regiment
Infantry:	73rd Brigade	13th Battalion, Middlesex Regiment
Infantry:	73rd Brigade	2nd Battalion, Leinster Regiment
Engineers and Support:	12th Battalion, Sherwood Foresters Regiment	

Order of battle for actions associated with holding Delville Wood: 4 September 1916 – April 1917

(United Kingdom) 14th (Light) Division
Commander: Major-General V. A. Couper
Infantry:	41st Brigade	7th Battalion, King's Royal Rifle Corps
Infantry:	41st Brigade	8th Battalion, King's Royal Rifle Corps
Infantry:	41st Brigade	7th Battalion, Rifle Brigade
Infantry:	41st Brigade	8th Battalion, Rifle Brigade
Infantry:	42nd Brigade	5th Battalion, Oxfordshire and Buckinghamshire Light Infantry
Infantry:	42nd Brigade	5th Battalion, King's Shropshire Light Infantry
Infantry:	42nd Brigade	9th Battalion, King's Royal Rifle Corps
Infantry:	42nd Brigade	9th Battalion, Rifle Brigade
Infantry:	43rd Brigade	6th Battalion, Somerset Light Infantry Regiment
Infantry:	43rd Brigade	6th Battalion, Duke of Cornwall's Light Infantry
Infantry:	43rd Brigade	6th Battalion, King's Own Yorkshire Light Infantry
Infantry:	43rd Brigade	10th Battalion, Durham Light Infantry Regiment
Engineers and Support:	11th Battalion, King's Regiment (Pioneers)	

Order of battle for actions associated with the second capture of Delville Wood: 1 – 28 August 1918

(United Kingdom) 38th (Welsh) Division
Commander: Major-General I. Phillips then Major-General C. G. Blackader
Infantry:	113th Brigade	13th Bn, (1st North Wales), Royal Welsh Fusiliers
Infantry:	113th Brigade	14th Bn, Royal Welsh Fusiliers
Infantry:	113th Brigade	15th Bn, (1st London Welsh), Royal Welsh Fusiliers
Infantry:	113th Brigade	16th Bn, Royal Welsh Fusiliers
Infantry:	114th Brigade	10th Battalion (1st Rhondda), Royal Welsh Regiment
Infantry:	114th Brigade	13th Battalion (2nd Rhondda), Royal Welsh Regiment
Infantry:	114th Brigade	15th Battalion (Carmarthenshire), Royal Welsh Regiment
Infantry:	114th Brigade	14th Battalion (Swansea), Royal Welsh Regiment
Infantry:	115th Brigade	17th Bn, (2nd North Wales), Royal Welsh Fusiliers
Infantry:	115th Brigade	10th Bn, (1st Gwent), South Wales Borderers
Infantry:	115th Brigade	11th Bn, (2nd Gwent), South Wales Borderers
Infantry:	115th Brigade	16th Bn, (Cardiff City), Royal Welsh Regiment
Engineers and Support:	19th Battalion (Glamorgan Pioneers), Royal Welsh Regiment	

=== South African casualties ===
1st South African Brigade: Casualties during the Battle of Delville Wood 14–20 July 1916
Brigade / Unit	Unit strength 14 July			Killed			Wounded			Missing / POW			Died of wounds to October			Total Casualties			Effective unit strength after 20 July		
	Off*	Other; Ranks	Total	Off*	Other; Ranks	Total	Off*	Other; Ranks	Total	Off*	Other; Ranks	Total	Off*	Other; Ranks	Total	Off*	Other; Ranks	Total	Off*	Other; Ranks	Total
1st Battalion	31	748	779	7	108	115	17	346	363	2	73	75	1	29	30	27	556	583	4	192	196
2nd Battalion	28	669	697	11	95	106	12	373	385	0	92	92	3	25	28	26	585	611	2	84	86
3rd Battalion	29	847	876	8	120	128	15	403	418	6	225	231	0	30	30	29	778	807	0	69	69
4th Battalion	27	672	699	4	104	108	15	293	308	1	84	85	0	32	32	20	513	533	7	159	166
Other	8	96	104	0	0	0	2	0	2	0	0	0	0	0	0	2	0	2	6	96	102
Total	123	3,032	3,155	30	427	457	61	1,415	1,476	9	474	483	4	116	120	104	2,432	2,536	19	600	619

Note: * = Officers

=== German Forces ===
Order of battle for forces of the German Empire for actions in Trônes Wood, Longueval and Delville Wood: 14 July – 3 September 1916

(German Empire) 3rd Guard Division
Commander: Generalmajor von Lindequist
Infantry:	Garde–Infanterie–Brigade Nr. 6	Garde–Füsilier–Regiment
Infantry:	Garde–Infanterie–Brigade Nr. 6	Lehr Infantry Regiment
Infantry:	Garde–Infanterie–Brigade Nr. 6	Colbergsches-Grenadier-Regiment Graf Gneisenau Nr. 9
Cavalry:	Garde Reserve Ulanen Regiment	
Artillery:	Garde–Artillerie–Brigade Nr. 63	Garde–Feldartillerie–Regiment Nr. 5
Artillery:	Garde–Artillerie–Brigade Nr. 63	II.Bataillon/Reserve–Fußartillerie–Regiment Nr. 6
Engineers and Support:	1. Kompanie/Pionier–Bataillon Nr. 28	Pionier–Kompanie Nr. 274
Engineers and Support:	Garde–Minenwerfer–Kompanie Nr. 3	3rd Guards Telephone Detachment

(German Empire) 5th Division
Commander: Generalleutnant Wichura
Infantry:	Infanterie–Brigade (Brandenburgisches) Nr. 10	Grenadier–Regiment Nr. 8
Infantry:	Infanterie–Brigade (Brandenburgisches) Nr. 10	Infanterie–Regiment von Alvensleben (6. Brandenburgisches) Nr. 52
Infantry:	Infanterie–Brigade (Brandenburgisches) Nr. 10	Grenadier–Regiment Prinz Karl von Preußen (2. Brandenburgisches) Nr. 12
Infantry:	Infanterie–Brigade (Brandenburgisches) Nr. 10	Field Machine Gun Company
Cavalry:	1/2" Husaren–Regiment von Zieten (Brandenburgisches) Nr. 3	
Artillery:	5.Feldartillerie–Brigade (Brandenburgisches)	Feldartillerie–Regiment General–Feldzeugmeister (2. Brandenburgisches) Nr. 18
Artillery:	5.Feldartillerie–Brigade (Brandenburgisches)	Neumärkisches Feldartillerie–Regiment Nr. 54
Engineers and Support:	1./Pionier–Bataillon von Rauch (1. Brandenb.) Nr. 3	3./Pionier–Bataillon von Rauch (1. Brandenburgisches) Nr. 3
Engineers and Support:	Minenwerfer–Kompanie (Brandenburg) Nr. 5	5th Brandenburg Telephone Detachment

(German Empire) 5th Bavarian Division
Commander: Generalleutnant Endres
Infantry:	9. bayerische Infanterie–Brigade	Kgl. Bayerisches 14. Infanterie–Regiment Hartmann
Infantry:	9. bayerische Infanterie–Brigade	Kgl. Bayerisches 21. Infanterie–Regiment Großherzog von Mecklenburg–Schwerin
Infantry:	10. bayerische Infanterie–Brigade	Kgl. Bayerisches 7. Infanterie–Regiment Prinz Leopold ment
Infantry:	10. bayerische Infanterie–Brigade	Kgl. Bayerisches 19. Infanterie–Regiment König Viktor Emanuel III. von Italien
Cavalry:	Kgl. Bayerisches 2. Chevaulegers–Regiment (2 Sqn's)	
Artillery:	5. bayerische Feldartillerie–Brigade	Kgl. Bayerisches 6. Feldartillerie–Regiment Prinz Ferdinand von Bourbon, Herzog von Calab
Artillery:	5. bayerische Feldartillerie–Brigade	Kgl. Bayerisches 10. Feldartillerie–Regiment
Artillery:	5. bayerische Feldartillerie–Brigade	Flugabwehrkanone–Abteilung (Anti–Aircraft section)
Engineers and Support:	Minenwerfer–Kompanie (Bayerisches) Nr. 5	1 & 4.Kompanie/Kgl. Bayerisches 3. Pionier–Bataillon
Engineers and Support:	5th Bavarian Pont. Engineers	5th Bavarian Telephone Detachment
Engineers and Support:	84th Labour Battalion	1st Bavarian Balloon Squadron

(German Empire) 7th Division
Commander: Generalleutnant Riedel
Infantry:	13. Infanterie–Brigade	Infanterie–Regiment Fürst Leopold von Anhalt–Dessau (1. Magdeburgisches) Nr.26
Cavalry:	2.Eskadron/Magdeburgisches Husaren–Regiment Nr. 10	
Artillery:	Artillerie–Kommandeur 7	Feldartillerie–Regiment Prinz–Regent Luitpold von Bayern (Magdeburgisches) Nr. 4
Artillery:	Artillerie–Kommandeur 7	Altmärkisches Feldartillerie–Regiment Nr. 40
Engineers and Support:	1./Magdeburgisches Pionier–Bataillon Nr. 4.	7 Pont Engineers
Engineers and Support:	7th Telephone Detachment	

(German Empire) 8th Division
Commander: General der Infanterie Ernst II. Herzog von Sachsen–Altenburg
Infantry:	15. Infanterie–Brigade	Altenburger Regiment 8.
Infantry:	15. Infanterie–Brigade	Thüringisches Infanterie–Regiment Nr. 93
Infantry:	16. Infanterie–Brigade	Thüringische Infanterie–Regiment Nr.72
Infantry:	16. Infanterie–Brigade	Thüringisches Infanterie–Regiment Nr. 153
Cavalry:	"1/2" Magdeburgisches Husaren–Regiment Nr. 10	
Artillery:	8. Feldartillerie–Brigade	Torgauer Feldartillerie–Regiment Nr.74
Artillery:	8. Feldartillerie–Brigade	Mansfelder Feldartillerie–Regiment Nr.75
Engineers and Support:	Minenwerfer–Kompanie Nr. 8	2./Magdeburgisches Pionier–Bataillon Nr. 4
Engineers and Support:	3./Magdeburgisches Pionier–Bataillon Nr. 4	8th Telephone Detachment

(German Empire) 10th Bavarian Division
Commander: Generalmajor Burkhardt
Infantry:	20. bayerische Infanterie–Brigade	Königlich Bayerische 16. Infanterie–Regiment Grossherzog Ferdinand von Toskana
Infantry:	20. bayerische Infanterie–Brigade	Bayerische 6. Reserve–Infanterie–Regiment
Infantry:	20. bayerische Infanterie–Brigade	Bayerische 8. Reserve–Infanterie–Regiment
Cavalry:	Bayerische 5. Kavallerie–Regiment	
Artillery:	10. bayerische Feldartillerie–Brigade	Bayerisches 19. Feldartillerie–Regiment
Artillery:	10. bayerische Feldartillerie–Brigade	Bayerisches 20. Feldartillerie–Regiment
Engineers and Support:	Minenwerfer–Kompanie (Bayerisches) Nr. 10	20 Kompanie Nr. 4 (Bayerisches) Pionier–Bataillon
Engineers and Support:	10th Pont. Engineers	10th Telephone Detachment

(German Empire) 12th Reserve Division
Commander: Generalmajor von Kehler
Infantry:	22. Reserve–Infanterie–Brigade	Remains of the Infanterie–Regiment von Winterfeldt (2. Oberschlesisches) Nr.23
Infantry:	22. Reserve–Infanterie–Brigade	Fusilier–Regiment Feldmarschall Graf Moltke (1.Schlesisches) Nr.38 (Ehrenstein–Riebel Bn)
Cavalry:	Reserve–Ulanen–Regiment Nr. 4	
Artillery:	Reserve–Feldartillerie–Regiment Nr. 12	7. & 32. Flugabwehrkanone–Abteilung (Anti–Aircraft sections)
Engineers and Support:	Reserve Minenwerfer–Kompanie Nr. 212	1.Reserve–Kompanie/Pionier–Bataillon Nr. 6
Engineers and Support:	2.Reserve–Kompanie/Pionier–Bataillon Nr. 6	12th Reserve Telephone Detachment
Engineers and Support:	8. bayerische Arbeit–Bataillon	

(German Empire) 17th Reserve Division
Commander: Generalmajor von Zieten
Infantry:	33rd Reserve Brigade	Reserve Infanterie Regiment Nr.75
Infantry:	33rd Reserve Brigade	Schleswig–Holsteinisches Infanterie Regiment Nr. 163
Cavalry:	Reserve Hussar Regiment Nr. 4	
Artillery:	17th Reserve Feldartillerie–Regiment (10 Bty's)	
Engineers and Support:	4 Field Co	2.Pion Bn Nr. 9
Engineers and Support:	Pionier Kompanie Nr. 340	Minenwerfer–Kompanie Nr.217
Engineers and Support:	17 Res Pont Engineers	

(German Empire) 24th Saxon Reserve Division
Commander: Generalmajor Morgenstern–Doring
Infantry:	Königlich Sächsische Reserve Infanterie Regiment Nr. 104	Königlich Sächsische Reserve Infanterie Regiment Nr. 107
Infantry:	Königlich Sächsische Reserve Infanterie Regiment Nr. 104	Königlich Sächsische Reserve Infanterie Regiment Nr. 133
Cavalry:	Kgl. Sächs. Reserve-Ulanen-Regiment (3x Sqn)	
Artillery:	24th Reserve Feldartillerie–Regiment (6 Bty's)	40th Reserve Feldartillerie–Regiment (6 Bty's)
Engineers and Support:	3 Res Co 12.Pion Bn	Reserve Pionier Kompanie Nr.4 Pionier Battalion Nr. 12
Engineers and Support:	Minenwerfer–Kompanie Nr.224	24 Res Pont Engineers
Engineers and Support:	24 Res Tele Detach	

(German Empire) 26th Division
Commander: Generalleutenant Herzog Wilhelm von Urach
Infantry:	Grenadier–Regiment Königin Olga (1. Württembergisches) Nr.119	Infanterie Regiment Kaiser Friedrich, König von Preußen (7. Württembergisches) Nr.125
Infantry:	Grenadier–Regiment Königin Olga (1. Württembergisches) Nr.119	Infanterie Regiment Alt–Württemberg (3. Württembergisches) Nr.121
Cavalry:	Uhlan Regiment Nr.20 (3 x Sqn)	
Artillery:	Feldartillerie–Regiment Nr.29	Feldartillerie–Regiment Nr.65
Engineers and Support:	Feldt–Pionier Kompanie Nr.1 and 5 Feldt–PionierBattalion Nr. 13	Minenwerfer–Kompanie Nr.26
Engineers and Support:	26 Pont Engineers	26 Tele Detach

(German Empire) 56th Division
Commander: Generalmajor von Wichmann
Infantry:	Fusilier–Regiment Prinz Heinrich von Preußen (1. Brandenburgisches) Nr.35	2. Nassauisches Infanterie–Regiment Nr.88
Infantry:	Fusilier–Regiment Prinz Heinrich von Preußen (1. Brandenburgisches) Nr.35	Infanterie Regiment Prinz Carl (4.Großherzoglich Hessisches) Nr. 118
Cavalry:	Fusilier–Regiment Prinz Heinrich von Preußen (1. Brandenburgisches) Nr.35	Uhlan Regiment Nr.17 (1 x Sqn)
Artillery:	56. Feldartillerie–Brigade	Feldartillerie–Regiment Nr.111
Artillery:	56. Feldartillerie–Brigade	Feldartillerie–Regiment Nr.112
Engineers and Support:	Feldt–Pionier Kompanie Nr.111	Feldt–Pionier Kompanie Nr.112
Engineers and Support:	Feldt–Pionier Kompanie Nr.6 PionsierBattalion Nr. 26	Minenwerfer–Kompanie Nr.56

== Footnotes ==
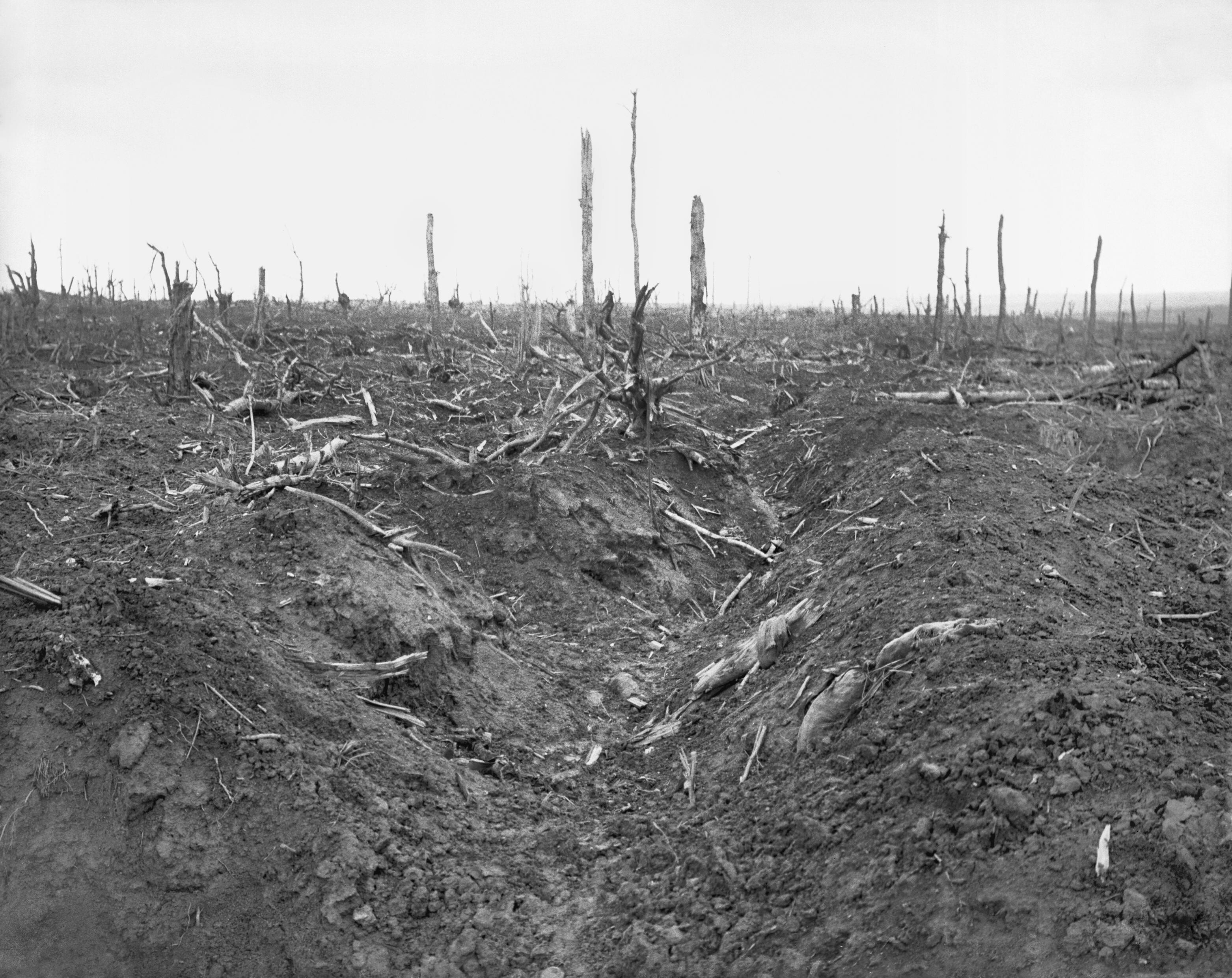
German trench Delville Wood, September 1916

== Bibliography ==
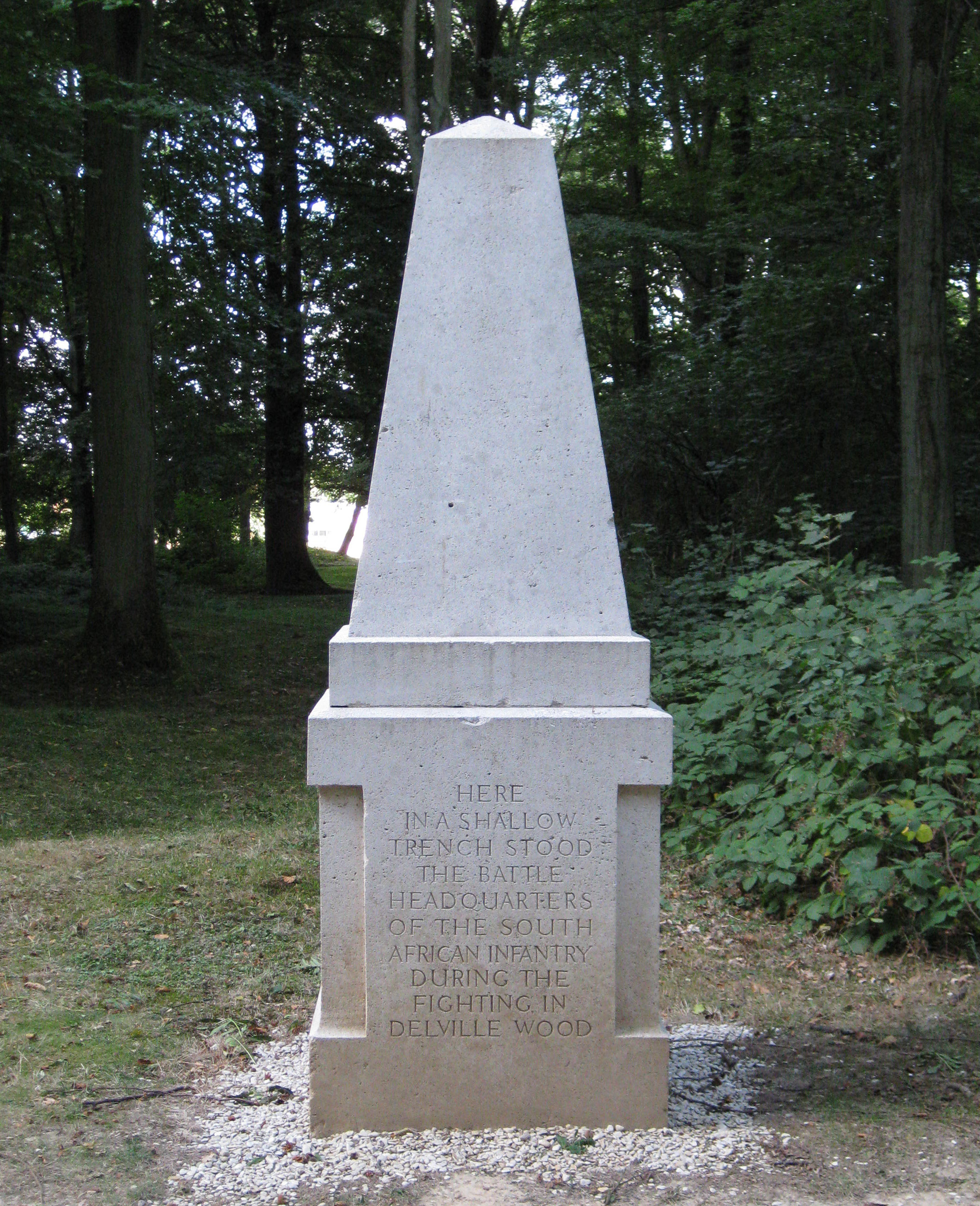
Memorial, South African Brigade Headquarters, Delville Wood.

- Ewing, J. (2009) [1921]. The History of the Ninth (Scottish) Division 1914–1919 (Naval & Military Press ed.). London: John Murray. ISBN 978-1-84342-190-0.
- Liddle, P. (2001) [1992]. The 1916 Battle of the Somme. London: Pen & Sword Books. ISBN 978-1-84022-240-1.
- Miles, W. (1992) [1938]. Military Operations in France and Belgium 1916: 2 July to the End of the Battles of the Somme. History of the Great War Based on Official Documents by Direction of the Historical Section of the Committee of Imperial Defence. Vol. II (Imperial War Museum & Battery Press ed.). London: Macmillan. ISBN 978-0-89839-169-5.
- Miles, W. (1994) [1938]. Military Operations, France and Belgium 1916: Maps and Appendices. History of the Great War Based on Official Documents by Direction of the Historical Section of the Committee of Imperial Defence. Vol. II (Imperial War Museum & Battery Press ed.). London: Macmillan. ISBN 978-0-89839-207-4.
- Moorhouse, B. (2003). Forged by Fire: The Battle Tactics and Soldiers of a World War One Battalion, The 7th Somerset Light Infantry (1st ed.). Staplehurst: Spellmount. ISBN 978-0-89839-207-4.
- The Union of South Africa and the Great War 1914–1918: Official History (pbk. facs. repr.Imperial War Museum and Naval & Military Press ed.). Pretoria: Government Print and Stationery Office. 2010 [1924]. ISBN 978-0-89839-207-4.
- Uys, I. (1991). Rollcall: The Delville Wood Story. Germiston: Uys Publishers. ISBN 978-0-9583173-1-3.
- Wyrall, E. (1921). The History of the Second Division, 1914–1918. Vol. II. London: Thomas Nelson and Sons. OCLC 869415401.
