= Max Hoffmann =

German military officer (1869–1927)

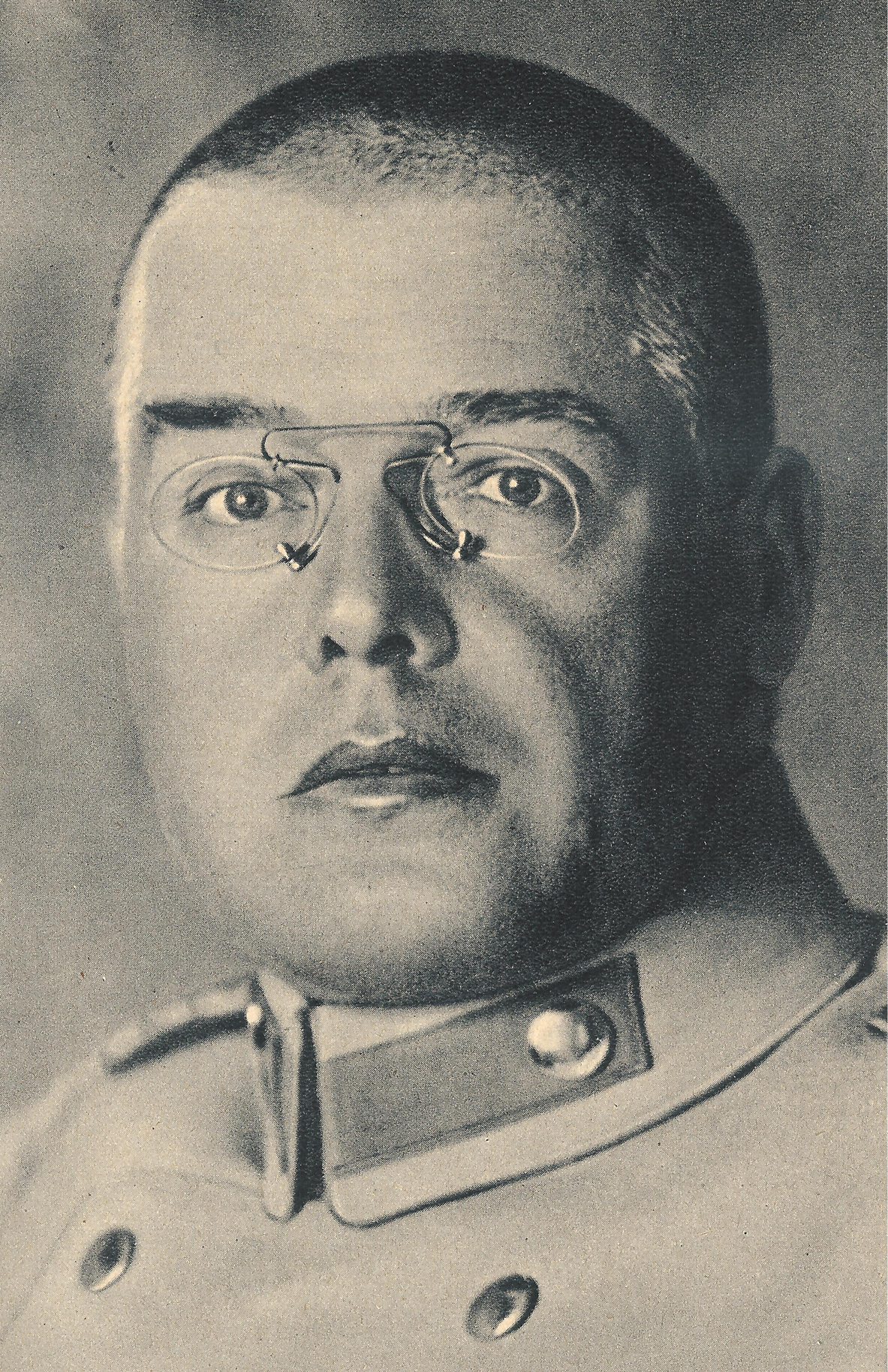
- Born: Carl Adolf Maximilian Hoffmann; 25 January 1869; Homberg (Efze), Kingdom of Prussia, North German Confederation
- Died: 8 July 1927 (aged 58); Bad Reichenhall, Bavaria, Weimar Republic
- Military career
- Allegiance: German Empire
- Branch: Imperial German Army
- Service years: 1887–1918
- Rank: Generalmajor
- Conflicts: First World War; Eastern Front; Russian Civil War; Soviet westward offensive of 1918–1919
- Awards: Pour le Mérite; Iron Cross First Class

Carl Adolf Maximilian Hoffmann (25 January 1869 – 8 July 1927) was a German military officer and strategist. As a staff officer at the beginning of World War I, he was Deputy Chief of Staff of the 8th Army, soon promoted Chief of Staff. Hoffmann, along with Erich Ludendorff, masterminded the devastating defeat of the Russian armies at Tannenberg and the Masurian Lakes. He then held the position of Chief of Staff of the Eastern Front. At the end of 1917, he negotiated with Russia to sign the Treaty of Brest-Litovsk.

== Early life and prewar military career ==
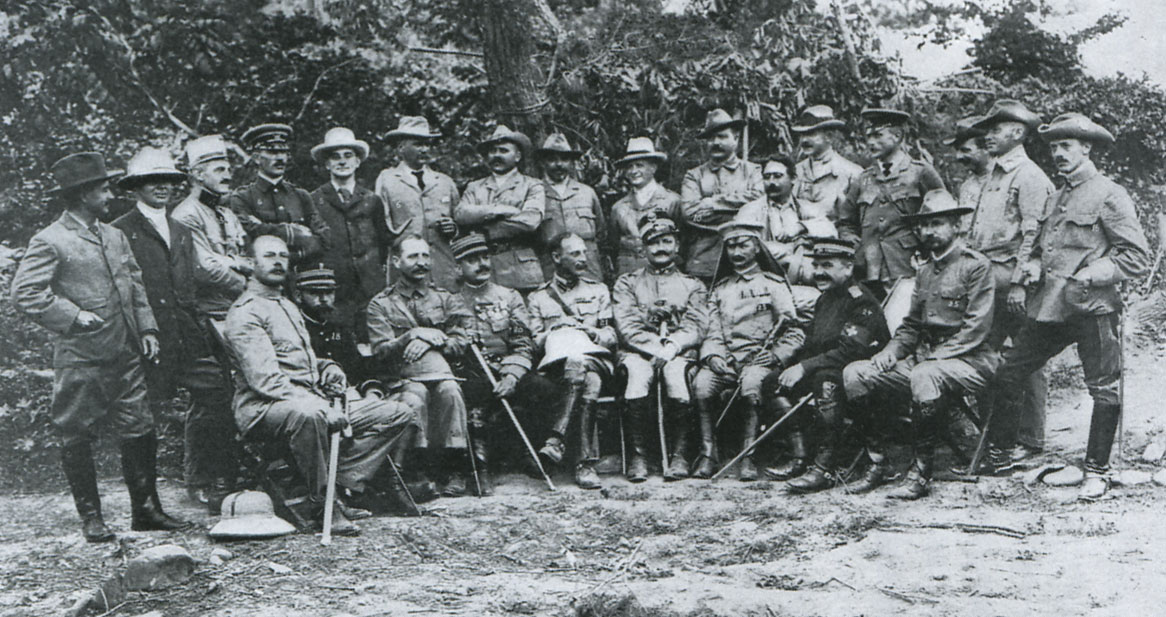
Foreign officers in the Russo-Japanese War, with Hoffmann at the far left of the front row

Hoffmann was born in Homberg (Efze) and was the son of a district court judge. From 1879 to 1887, he studied at the gymnasium in the city of Nordhausen. After his graduation, he volunteered for the 72nd Infantry Regiment. One of his comrades affectionately recalled, "He was almost the worst athlete, horseman and swordsman of them all.... he exceeded them in his terrifying appetite". As an ensign, he studied at the Kriegsschule (Officer School) in Neisse from October 1887 to August 1888, graduated with an Imperial commendation and was commissioned second lieutenant. From 1895 to 1898, as a first lieutenant, he attended the Prussian War Academy and then was sent to Russia to study the Russian language. He was on the General Staff from 1899 to 1901 in the First Department (Russia and the Nordic States). In 1901, he was promoted to captain and assigned as a staff officer to V Army Corps. Two years later, he moved to command a company in the 33rd Fusilier Regiment. In 1904 the General Staff sent him to Manchuria as an observer with the Imperial Japanese Army in its war against the Imperial Russian Army. During that time, he is remembered for breaching protocol in the presence of other foreign observers when a Japanese general refused to allow him on to a hill to watch a battle. That led him to respond that the general was "a yellow-skin" and that he was "uncivilized if you don't let me go over that hill".

He returned to the staff twenty months later before he was assigned as the first staff officer of the 1st Division, stationed in Königsberg, East Prussia. In 1911, he became an instructor at the War Academy for two years before he moved to the 112th Infantry Regiment, where he had a field and then a staff position and was promoted to lieutenant colonel.

== World War I ==
=== Eighth Army ===
The German Empire entered World War I on 1 August 1914; Hoffmann became the first general staff officer of the German Eighth Army with the responsibility of defending Germany's eastern border from Russian attack. The bulk of the German Army, carrying out the Schlieffen Plan, massed in the west to gain decisive victory there by knocking France out of the war. The Russian mobilization, secretly begun as early as 25 July 1914, became a general mobilisation on 30 July 1914 (before Germany declared war), and it proceeded much more quickly than Berlin had anticipated: the Russian First Army crossed the eastern frontier of East Prussia on 17 August 1914. The German Eighth Army attacked the invaders unsuccessfully at the Battle of Gumbinnen on 20 August 1914. The Germans learned that the Russian Second Army was approaching the southern frontier of East Prussia in the west. To avoid being cut off, the alarmed Eighth Army commander, Maximilian von Prittwitz, proposed to retreat over the Vistula River and to abandon East Prussia to the invaders. He soon reconsidered and instead decided to move the bulk of his forces to block the Russian Second Army from reaching the Vistula, but on 22 August 1914 he and his chief of staff Georg von Waldersee, had already been relieved in favor of Paul von Hindenburg and Erich Ludendorff respectively. (Hoffmann knew Ludendorff well: they had been neighbours in the same building in Berlin for several years.)

The two Russian armies were too far apart to aid each other readily, and the Germans could gauge their lack of co-ordination from intercepted radio-messages. After Hindenburg and Ludendorff arrived in the east in their special train on 23 August 1914, they adopted Hoffmann's plan for the Eighth Army to manoeuvre to encircle and annihilate Alexander Samsonov's Russian Second Army. As a result the German forces won the crucial victory of the Battle of Tannenberg in late August 1914, saving the rest of Germany from invasion. Hoffmann saw the propaganda-value of casting the German victory as long-awaited revenge for a nearby medieval defeat in 1410, and so he suggested naming the engagement "Tannenberg" (though the fighting actually took place much closer to Allenstein). (Ludendorff also claimed credit for the naming, but it was Hindenburg, who had lost an ancestor at the earlier battle, who requested that the Kaiser use it.) Next, the Eighth Army turned east and mauled Paul von Rennenkampf's Russian First Army at the First Battle of the Masurian Lakes in early September 1914 — this freed most of East Prussia.

=== Ninth Army and Ober Ost ===
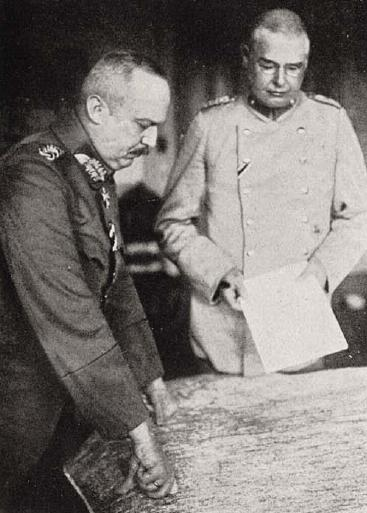
General Erich Ludendorff (left) with Colonel Max Hoffmann on the Eastern Front, 1915–1916

Then, Hindenburg, Ludendorff and Hoffmann led a new Ninth Army in blocking a Russian attempt to invade German Silesia, continuing the campaign after being given command of all of the German forces on the Eastern Front, which were designated as Ober Ost. In the Battle of Łódź they ended the immediate threat by outflanking the Russians and capturing Poland's second city. Hoffmann believed that if given the reinforcements that they requested for the battle, they might have knocked Russia out of the war. During the winter lull in the fighting, Ober Ost struggled unsuccessfully to shift major operations eastward in the coming year and claimed that it could force the Russians out of the war by encircling its armies in the Polish salient.

Ober Ost began 1915 with a surprise attack in a snowstorm that encircled a Russian army, completed the liberation of East Prussia and obtained a foothold in Russia's Baltic provinces. Hoffmann believed that if it were allowed to continue the incursion, he might have inflicted a major, perhaps mortal, defeat on the Russians. Instead, the Germans were ordered to stop in favour of a major thrust in the south of Poland at Gorlice and Tarnów in which a joint Austro-German army gradually battered the Russians out of Galicia (Austro-Hungarian Poland). To assist, Ober Ost was ordered to mount similar costly head-on attacks in northern Poland. After the Russians had evacuated Poland, Ober Ost was permitted to continue thrusting into Russia's Baltic provinces. By the start of winter, its headquarters were in the Lithuanian city of Kovno. Hoffmann saw to the construction a strong defensive line on the new front and visited all of the units: "I have crawled through all the trenches.... The mud is terrible". Meanwhile, Ludendorff set up an administration for the occupied region.

During the winter, the Russians finally armed their troops adequately. In the spring, masses of Russians attacked the Ober Ost entrenchments. The German line held, except for one segment that was vacated and then recaptured in April. To exploit the successful defence, Ober Ost pleaded for reinforcements to enable it to capture the fortress of Riga and to roll up the Russian armies in the north, but the Supreme Commander focused on his fruitless attacks on Verdun. On 4 June the Russians attacked the Austro-Hungarian lines in the south. In a few days, the defenders lost 200,000 prisoners, and the Russians penetrated through their fortifications. Ober Ost sent reinforcements south and more had to come from the west. To Hoffmann, the Austrian front was "like a mouth full of sensitive teeth". At last, in July, Hindenburg's command was extended further south, including many of the Austro-Hungarians on the front. Therefore, they moved their headquarters south to Brest-Litovsk. When the Russians also renewed their attacks in the north, the German reserves in the east were a single cavalry brigade. In addition to plugging holes along their long front, the staff was busy organizing training for the Austro-Hungarians whom they now commanded and the Russians were still pushing back.

=== Chief of the staff in east ===
The crisis worsened when Romania entered the war on the side of the Entente. Hindenburg and Ludendorff became the Supreme Commanders. Field Marshal Prince Leopold of Bavaria, whom Hoffmann regarded as "a clever soldier and a distinguished superior officer", took command of three army groups that included both German and Austro-Hungarian troops and Hoffmann was elated to become his chief of staff with promotion to major general: "I shall actually become an Excellenz!". He was supported by a highly-competent staff. Eventually, they commanded all of the forces of the Central Powers on the Eastern Front: German, Austro-Hungarian, Ottoman, and Bulgarian. Since he was no longer able to visit the front in person, he was assigned a General Staff officer, Major Wachenfeld, for this purpose. The Russians shifted their attacks to the south to support Romania but were beaten decisively by an army with troops from all of the Central Powers.

That autumn, Franz Joseph I of Austria died. His successor, Charles I, who had been a cavalry officer, appointed himself commander-in-chief and replaced their able chief of staff with "a more conciliatory personage".

Hoffmann had a two-hour conversation in which the young emperor "gave his opinion on military matters by which he displayed his great want of understanding in all he said".

Hoffmann corresponded and met with political leaders like Wolfgang Kapp, a founder of the right-wing Fatherland Party who after the war led a failed putsch to overturn the Weimar Republic.

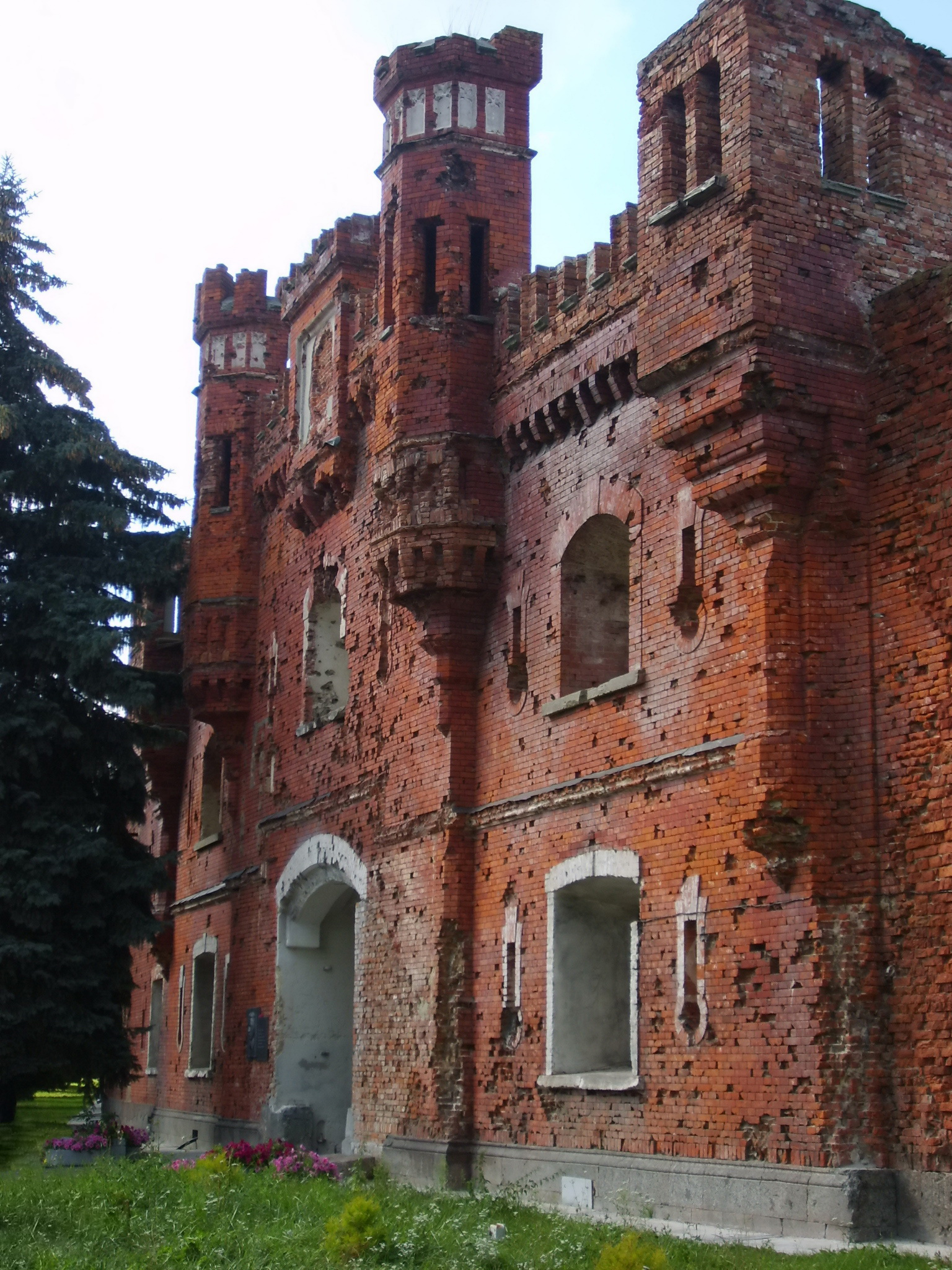
The entrance to the fortress at Brest-Litovsk, the headquarters for the Eastern Front and the site of the peace negotiations

When 1917 dawned, the battering made the Russian infantry seem to have suffered when attacking, and most were now willing only to defend their positions. The February Revolution then led to a new Russian government, under Alexander Kerensky. Hoffmann wanted to attack, but only a single division was given to him to reduce a Russian bridgehead. In July, Kerensky launched an offensive in Galicia in the hope of reinvigorating public support for the war. Hoffmann had anticipated the attack and was eager to launch his countermove.

At first, the Austro-Hungarians lost ground, but on 19 July, Prince Leopold and Hoffmann were in a tower to watch the Germans counterattack the flank of the Russian incursion slicing through to the rear. In a few days, the Russians were driven out of Galicia, but further pursuit had to be delayed while the railroads were repaired. Hoffmann was rewarded with the Oak Leaves for his Pour le Mérite. On 1 September, he attacked the Riga fortresses, by throwing pontoon bridges across the intervening river. He took Riga, but most of the defenders had slipped out.

On 26 November, he received a wireless message from the new Russian Bolshevik government, which requested an armistice. The Germans sent a delegation to Hoffmann's headquarters after they had dining with the delegation in the mess room that included a peasant and a political assassin. He was dismayed that they had been received as representing Russia. He assisted Foreign Secretary Richard von Kühlmann during the negotiations for the Treaty of Brest-Litovsk since his fluent Russian was an asset. Austro-Hungarian Foreign Minister Ottokar Czernin found, "The General [Hoffmann] combined expert knowledge and energy with a good deal of calm and ability, but also not a little of Prussian brutality...". The negotiations dragged on; the major sticking point was that the Russians would not be given back Poland, Lithuania or Courland, which the Central Powers maintained had opted for independence.

In December 1917, he was summoned to Berlin, where at lunch, the Kaiser ordered him, despite his objections, to give his opinion regarding the postwar German–Polish border. He favoured taking from Poland a modest defensive strip to acquire as few new Slavic subjects as possible. The Supreme Commanders wanted much of Poland and so they were furious when the Kaiser endorsed his viewpoint. Both threatened to resign; the Kaiser gave in on the border but refused Ludendorff's demand for Hoffmann to be sent off to command a division. Hindenburg does not mention him in his memoirs.

Ludendorff undermined him with a press campaign that alleged that his ideas came from his Jewish wife, who was a well-known artist from a family of converts. Hoffmann wrote "great men can also be very small sometimes".

After a break, the negotiations were resumed with Foreign Commissar Leon Trotsky, who led the Russian delegation; he stopped them from eating with the enemy. Hoffmann did not write any clause in the treaty, but Trotsky "did not doubt for a single minute that... General Hoffmann was the only element of serious reality in these negotiations". The Central Powers simultaneously negotiated with a delegation representing an independent Ukraine. In late January 1918, Trotsky returned to Petrograd to consult about the Ukrainian problem. When he returned, a peace with the Ukrainians had been signed. On 10 February, Trotsky announced that Russia would consider the war at an end but would not sign the proposed treaty. Eight days, later the Eastern Army resumed its offensive and swept over the remainder of the Baltic provinces without opposition. After two days, the Russians caved in, and the treaty was signed on 3 March 1918.

German troops marched into Ukraine to prop up the beleaguered independent government and also went further east into the Don basin to obtain the coal to ship the grain that they had seized. Hoffmann anticipated that the Crimea would become the German Riviera. The Supreme Commanders set up new administrations for Ukraine and the Baltic States and strikingly diminished Prince Leopold's and Hoffmann's territorial sway since they were left with only Ober Ost. Hoffmann argued unsuccessfully that to counter the Bolsheviks, they should denounce the treaty and forcibly establish a new government in Russia.

== Later life ==
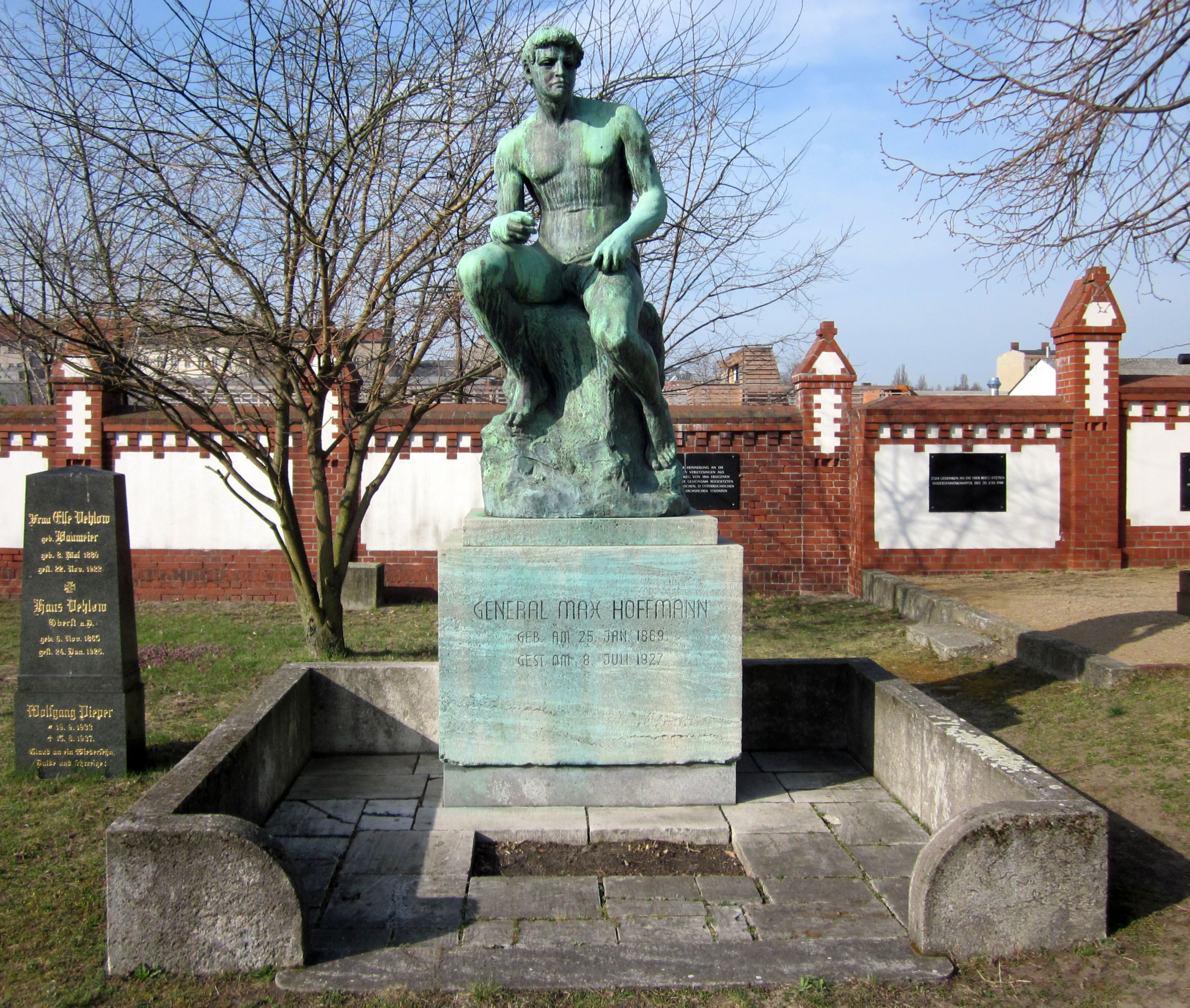
Grave of Max Hoffmann (1927) on the Invalidenfriedhof Berlin

In 1919, he was given command of a brigade along the Polish border. The leader of the new small German Army was Hans von Seeckt, who had quarreled with Hoffmann during the war. Hoffmann was retired in March 1920 and settled back in Berlin, where he reconciled with Hindenburg at a personal meeting. He and the industrialist Arnold Rechberg campaigned persistently trying to persuade the western powers to join to overthrow the Soviet Union. He published his wartime memoirs and evaluations, his views on Russia, and his version of Tannenberg. A few years after the war, when touring the field at Tannenberg, Hoffmann told a group of army cadets, "See—this is where Hindenburg slept before the battle, this is where Hindenburg slept after the battle, and between you and me this is where Hindenburg slept during the battle".

Hoffmann died at the spa at Bad Reichenhall on 8 July 1927. He was rated by some historians "as perhaps the most brilliant staff officer of his generation" and was used as a model at the United States Army Command and General Staff College."
