= IV Corps (German Empire) =

Corps level command of the Prussian and Imperial German Armies

IV Army Corps IV. Armee-Korps
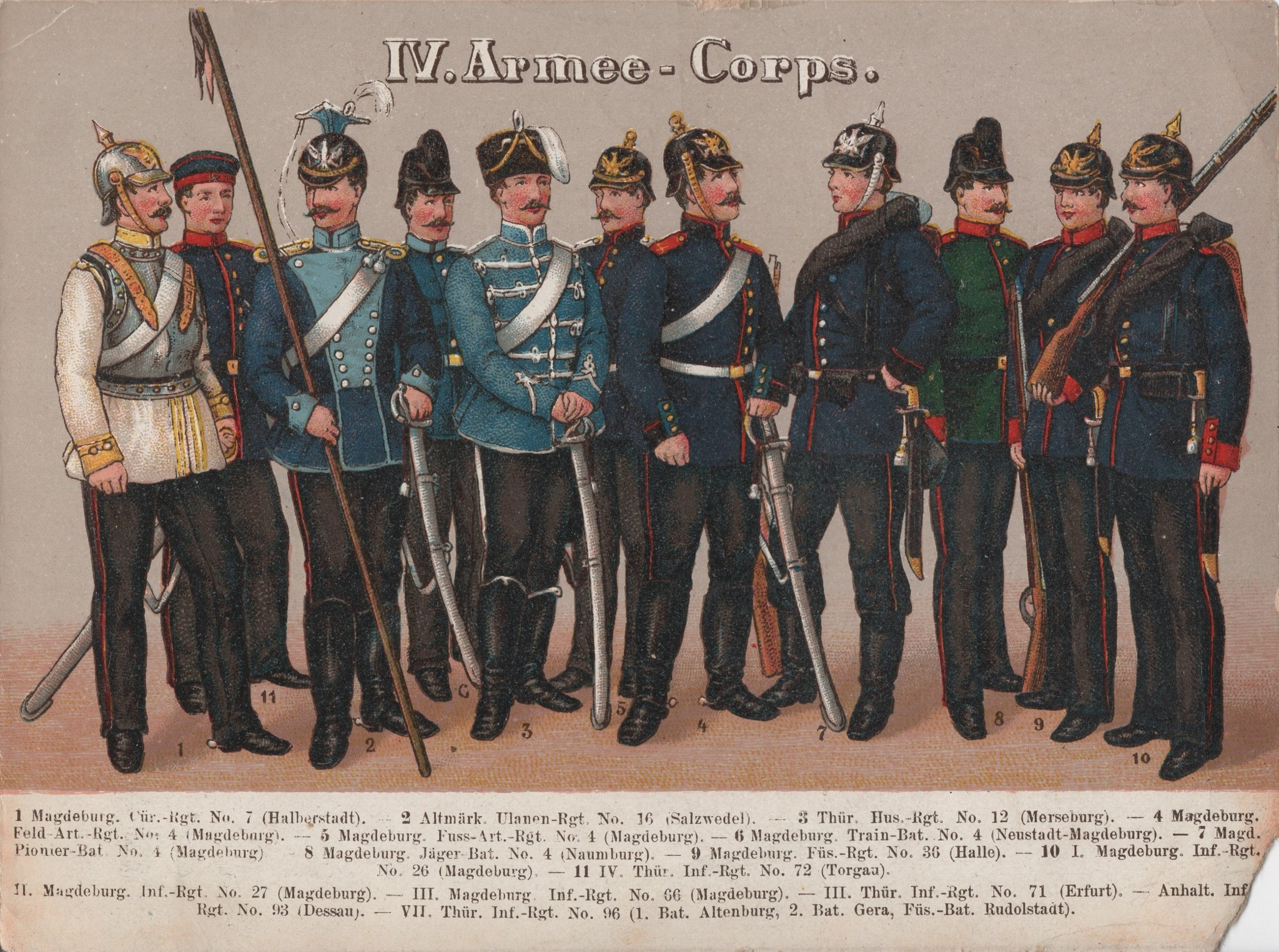
- Uniforms of the IV Army Corps during La Belle Époque
- Active: 3 October 1815–1919
- Country: Prussia / German Empire
- Type: Corps
- Size: Approximately 44,000 (on mobilisation in 1914)
- Garrison/HQ: Magdeburg/Augusta-Straße 42
- Shoulder strap piping: Red
- Engagements: Austro-Prussian War Battle of Königgrätz Franco-Prussian War Battle of Beaumont Battle of Sedan Siege of Paris World War I Battle of the Frontiers Battle of Mons First Battle of the Marne Battle of the Somme

Commanders
- Notable commanders: Leonhard Graf von Blumenthal (1871-1888); Paul von Hindenburg (1903-1911); Friedrich Sixt von Armin (1911-1917)

The IV Army Corps / IV AK (German: IV. Armee-Korps) was a corps level command of the Prussian and then the Imperial German Armies from the 19th Century to World War I.

It was established on 3 October 1815 as the General Command in the Duchy of Saxony (Generalkommando im Herzogtum Sachsen) and became the IV Army Corps on 30 August 1818. Its headquarters was in Magdeburg and its catchment area included the Prussian Province of Saxony and the adjacent Saxon Duchies (Saxe-Altenburg, Anhalt) and Principalities (Schwarzburg-Sondershausen, Schwarzburg-Rudolstadt, Reuss Elder Line and Reuss Junior Line).

In peacetime, the Corps was assigned to the VI Army Inspectorate but joined the 1st Army at the start of the First World War. It was still in existence at the end of the war in the 6th Army, Heeresgruppe Kronprinz Rupprecht on the Western Front. The Corps was disbanded with the demobilisation of the German Army after World War I.

== Austro-Prussian War ==
The IV Corps formed part of Prince Friedrich Karl of Prussia's 1st Army and fought in the Austro-Prussian War against Austria in 1866, including the Battle of Königgrätz.

== Franco-Prussian War ==
In the Franco-Prussian War of 1870-71, the Corps formed part of the 2nd Army that was commanded by Prince Friedrich Karl of Prussia. It saw action in the battles of Beaumont and Sedan, and in the Siege of Paris.

== Peacetime organisation ==
The 25 peacetime Corps of the German Army (Guards, I - XXI, I - III Bavarian) had a reasonably standardised organisation. Each consisted of two divisions with usually two infantry brigades, one field artillery brigade and a cavalry brigade each. Each brigade normally consisted of two regiments of the appropriate type, so each Corps normally commanded 8 infantry, 4 field artillery and 4 cavalry regiments. There were exceptions to this rule:

V, VI, VII, IX and XIV Corps each had a 5th infantry brigade (so 10 infantry regiments)
II, XIII, XVIII and XXI Corps had a 9th infantry regiment
I, VI and XVI Corps had a 3rd cavalry brigade (so 6 cavalry regiments)
the Guards Corps had 11 infantry regiments (in 5 brigades) and 8 cavalry regiments (in 4 brigades).

Each Corps also directly controlled a number of other units. This could include one or more

Foot Artillery Regiment
Jäger Battalion
Pioneer Battalion
Train Battalion

Peacetime organization of the Corps
Corps	Division	Brigade	Units	Garrison
IV Corps	7th Division	13th Infantry Brigade	26th (1st Magdeburg) Infantry "Prince Leopold of Anhalt-Dessau"	Magdeburg
IV Corps	7th Division	13th Infantry Brigade	66th (3rd Magdeburg) Infantry	Magdeburg
IV Corps	7th Division	14th Infantry Brigade	27th (2nd Magdeburg) Infantry "Prince Louis Ferdinand of Prussia"	Halberstadt
IV Corps	7th Division	14th Infantry Brigade	165th (5th Hannover) Infantry	Quedlinburg, II Bn at Blankenburg
IV Corps	7th Division	7th Field Artillery Brigade	4th (Magdeburg) Field Artillery "Prince Regent Luitpold of Bavaria"	Magdeburg
IV Corps	7th Division	7th Field Artillery Brigade	40th (Altmark) Field Artillery	Burg
IV Corps	7th Division	7th Cavalry Brigade	10th (Magdeburg) Hussars	Stendal
IV Corps	7th Division	7th Cavalry Brigade	16th (Altmark) Uhlans "Hennigs von Treffenfeld"	Salzwedel, Gardelegen
IV Corps	8th Division	15th Infantry Brigade	36th (Magdeburg) Fusiliers "General Field Marshal Count Blumenthal"	Halle, II Bn at Bernburg
IV Corps	8th Division	15th Infantry Brigade	93rd (Anhalt) Infantry	Dessau, II Bn at Zerbst
IV Corps	8th Division	16th Infantry Brigade	72nd (4th Thuringian) Infantry	Torgau, III Bn at Eilenburg
IV Corps	8th Division	16th Infantry Brigade	153rd (8th Thuringian) Infantry	Altenburg, III Bn at Merseburg
IV Corps	8th Division	8th Field Artillery Brigade	74th (Torgau) Field Artillery	Torgau, Wittenberg
IV Corps	8th Division	8th Field Artillery Brigade	75th (Mansfeld) Field Artillery	Halle
IV Corps	8th Division	8th Cavalry Brigade	7th (Magdeburg) Cuirassiers "von Seydlitz"	Halberstadt, Quedlinburg
IV Corps	8th Division	8th Cavalry Brigade	12th (Thuringian) Hussars	Torgau
IV Corps	Corps Troops		4th (Magdeburg) Jäger Battalion "von Neumann"	Naumburg (Saale)
IV Corps	Corps Troops		4th (Magdeburg) Foot Artillery "Encke"	Magdeburg
IV Corps	Corps Troops		4th (Magdeburg) Pioneer Battalion	Magdeburg
IV Corps	Corps Troops		4th (Magdeburg) Train Battalion	Magdeburg
IV Corps	Halle an der Saale Defence Command (Landwehr-Inspektion)			Halle

== World War I ==
=== Organisation on mobilisation ===
On mobilization on 2 August 1914 the Corps was restructured. 8th Cavalry Brigade was withdrawn to form part of the 2nd Cavalry Division and the 7th Cavalry Brigade was broken up: the 10th Hussar Regiment was raised to a strength of 6 squadrons before being split into two half-regiments of 3 squadrons each and the half-regiments were assigned as divisional cavalry to 7th and 8th Divisions; the 16th Uhlan Regiment was likewise assigned as two half-regiments to 13th and 14th Divisions of VII Corps. Divisions received engineer companies and other support units from the Corps headquarters. In summary, IV Corps mobilised with 25 infantry battalions, 9 machine gun companies (54 machine guns), 6 cavalry squadrons, 24 field artillery batteries (144 guns), 4 heavy artillery batteries (16 guns), 3 pioneer companies and an aviation detachment.

Initial wartime organization of the Corps
Corps	Division	Brigade	Units
IV Corps	7th Division	13th Infantry Brigade	26th Infantry Regiment
IV Corps	7th Division	13th Infantry Brigade	66th Infantry Regiment
IV Corps	7th Division	14th Infantry Brigade	27th Infantry Regiment
IV Corps	7th Division	14th Infantry Brigade	165th Infantry Regiment
IV Corps	7th Division	7th Field Artillery Brigade	4th Field Artillery Regiment
IV Corps	7th Division	7th Field Artillery Brigade	40th Field Artillery Regiment
IV Corps	7th Division		staff and half of 10th Hussar Regiment
IV Corps	7th Division		2nd Company, 4th Pioneer Battalion
IV Corps	7th Division		3rd Company, 4th Pioneer Battalion
IV Corps	7th Division		7th Divisional Pontoon Train
IV Corps	7th Division		2nd Medical Company
IV Corps	8th Division	15th Infantry Brigade	36th Fusilier Regiment
IV Corps	8th Division	15th Infantry Brigade	93rd Infantry Regiment
IV Corps	8th Division	15th Infantry Brigade	4th Jäger Battalion
IV Corps	8th Division	16th Infantry Brigade	72nd Infantry Regiment
IV Corps	8th Division	16th Infantry Brigade	153rd Infantry Regiment
IV Corps	8th Division	8th Field Artillery Brigade	74th Field Artillery Regiment
IV Corps	8th Division	8th Field Artillery Brigade	75th Field Artillery Regiment
IV Corps	8th Division		half of 10th Hussar Regiment
IV Corps	8th Division		1st Company, 4th Pioneer Battalion
IV Corps	8th Division		8th Divisional Pontoon Train
IV Corps	8th Division		1st Medical Company
IV Corps	8th Division		3rd Medical Company
IV Corps	Corps Troops		I Battalion, 4th Foot Artillery Regiment
IV Corps	Corps Troops		9th Aviation Detachment
IV Corps	Corps Troops		4th Corps Pontoon Train
IV Corps	Corps Troops		4th Telephone Detachment
IV Corps	Corps Troops		4th Pioneer Searchlight Section
IV Corps	Corps Troops		Munition Trains and Columns corresponding to II Corps

=== Combat chronicle ===
On mobilisation, IV Corps was assigned to the 1st Army on the right wing of the forces for the Schlieffen Plan offensive in August 1914 on the Western Front. It participated in the Battle of Mons and the First Battle of the Marne which marked the end of the German advances in 1914. Later, it participated in the Battle of the Somme, particularly the Battle of Delville Wood and the Battle of Pozières.

It was still in existence at the end of the war in the 6th Army, Heeresgruppe Kronprinz Rupprecht on the Western Front.

=== 49th Landwehr Brigade ===
During the war, the 49th Landwehr Brigade joined the corps; it had originally been part of 4th Army. It had its headquarters at Bois de Lord farm on the River Aisne for most of the First World War. From 1915 the 49th Landwehr Brigade was commanded by Lt. General Hans von Blumenthal, who had retired in 1910 after disagreements with his commanding officer General Maximilian von Prittwitz. On the outbreak of war he had returned to active service, first to command 60th Landwehr Brigade.

== Commanders ==
The IV Corps had the following commanders during its existence:

From	Rank	Name
3 October 1815	General der Infanterie	Friedrich Graf Kleist von Nollendorf
5 March 1821	General der Infanterie	Friedrich Wilhelm von Jagow
4 September 1830	Generalleutnant	Georg Leopold Graf von Hake
30 March 1836	Generalleutnant	Prince Charles of Prussia
5 March 1848	Generalleutnant	August Georg von Hedemann
19 February 1852	General der Kavallerie	Wilhelm Fürst von Radziwill
3 January 1858	General der Infanterie	Hans Wilhelm von Schack
30 October 1866	General der Infanterie	Gustav von Alvensleben
2 October 1871	General der Infanterie	Leonhard Graf von Blumenthal
17 April 1888	General der Infanterie	Wilhelm von Grolmann
22 March 1889	General der Kavallerie	Carl von Hänisch
1 September 1897	General der Infanterie	Richard von Klitzing
27 January 1903	General der Infanterie	Paul von Hindenburg
20 March 1911	General der Infanterie	Friedrich Sixt von Armin
25 February 1917	Generalleutnant	Richard von Kraewel
20 December 1918	General der Infanterie	Kuno von Steuben
30 January 1919	Generalleutnant	Johannes von Malachowski
10 February 1919	Generalleutnant	Alfred von Kleist

== See also ==
- Franco-Prussian War order of battle
- German Army order of battle (1914)
- German Army order of battle, Western Front (1918)
- List of Imperial German infantry regiments
- List of Imperial German artillery regiments
- List of Imperial German cavalry regiments
- Order of battle at Mons
- Order of battle of the First Battle of the Marne

== Bibliography ==
- Cron, Hermann (2002). Imperial German Army 1914-18: Organisation, Structure, Orders-of-Battle [first published: 1937]. Helion & Co. ISBN 1-874622-70-1.
- Ellis, John; Cox, Michael (1993). The World War I Databook. Aurum Press Ltd. ISBN 1-85410-766-6.
- Haythornthwaite, Philip J. (1996). The World War One Source Book. Arms and Armour. ISBN 1-85409-351-7.
- Histories of Two Hundred and Fifty-One Divisions of the German Army which Participated in the War (1914–1918), compiled from records of Intelligence section of the General Staff, American Expeditionary Forces, at General Headquarters, Chaumont, France 1919. The London Stamp Exchange Ltd. 1989 [1920]. ISBN 0-948130-87-3.
- The German Forces in the Field; 7th Revision, 11th November 1918; Compiled by the General Staff, War Office. Imperial War Museum, London and the Battery Press. 1995 [1918]. ISBN 978-1-870423-95-3.
