= 10th (Magdeburg) Hussars =

10th (Magdeburg) Hussars Magdeburgisches Husarenregiment Nr. 10
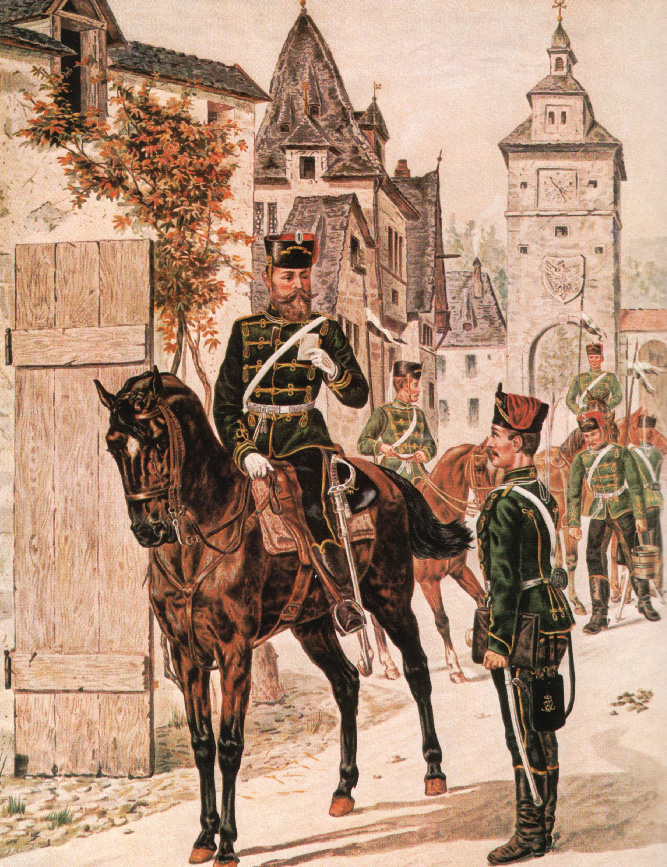
- Prussian Hussars of the 10th Regiment
- Active: 1813–1920
- Disbanded: 1920
- Countries: Kingdom of Prussia (1813–1871); German Empire (1871–1919); Weimar Republic (1919–1920)
- Branch: Prussian Army
- Type: Hussars
- Role: Reporting and reconnaissance
- Size: 6 squadrons (as of 1914)
- Part of: IV Army Corps; 7 Infantry Division; 7 Cavalry Brigade
- Garrison/HQ: Aschersleben and Stendal
- March: Trotting march of Hussar Regiment No. 10; (Trabmarsch des Husaren Regiments 10)
- Engagements: Siege of Magdeburg; Battle of Ligny; 1848 March Revolution; Austro-Prussian War; Franco-Prussian War; Boxer Rebellion; German South-West Africa; World War I
- Decorations: Ribbon with the Memorial Cross
- Honorary name: Magdeburg (Magdeburgisches)

Commanders
- Regimental Colonel in Chief (Regimentsinhaber): Grand Duke Nicholas Nikolaevich of Russia

Insignia
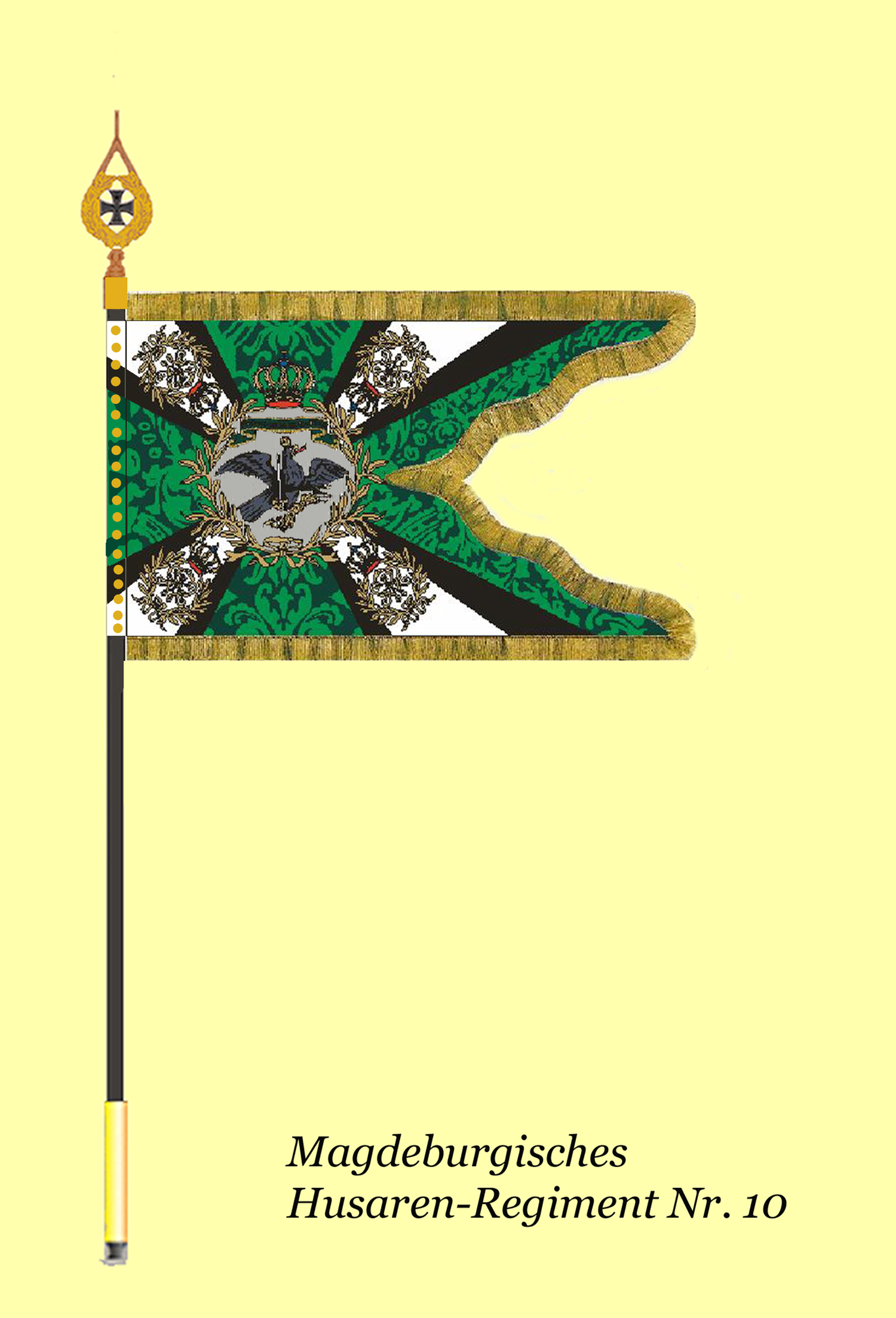
- Standard

The 10th (Magdeburg) Hussars Regiment (German: Magdeburgisches Husaren-Regiment Nr. 10) were a Prussian Light cavalry regiment of the IV Corps that was formed in late 1813 during the War of the Sixth Coalition against Napoleon after the Battle of Leipzig. The Hussars were a distinctively dressed light cavalry of East European origin. The 10th Hussars were stationed from 1814 to 1884 in Aschersleben and after 1884 in Stendal. They fought in 1866 at the Battle of Königgrätz and later in World War I.

== Organization and Commanders in 1914 ==
IV Army Corps in Magdeburg, Commanding General: General of the Infantry (Germany) Friedrich Sixt von Armin

7 Infantry Division in Magdeburg, Commander: Lieutenant-General Riedel

7th Cavalry Brigade in Magdeburg, Commander: Colonel Saenger

- Regimental Colonel in Chief (German: Regimentsinhaber): Grand Duke Nicholas Nikolaevich of Russia (1856–1929)
- Regimental Commander: Lieutenant Colonel Walter Baron Treusch von Buttlar-Brandenfels
- Foundation Day: 19 November 1813
- Garrison locations: Aschersleben and Stendal

== History ==
This hussar regiment is first mentioned as the Volunteer Elbe National Hussars Regiment. On 25 May 1814, the regiment's former militia status was cancelled and it was designated the 10th Hussars Regiment (1 Magdeburg), also popularly referred to as the Green Hussars from Aschersleben, and transferred to active status in the Prussian Army.

The regiment was assigned to Aschersleben as a garrison. At the time of the reform of the army under King William I on 7 May 1861, the regiment already held its final name of 10th (Magdeburg) Hussars Regiment, in German (Magdeburgisches Husaren Regiment Nr. 10). The regiment took part in the Battle of Königgrätz as part of the IV Corps of the First Army on 3 July 1866 when the Prussians defeated the Austrian Empire. Between 1866 and 1870, a fifth squadron was established. The regiment was relocated to Stendal in 1884, and in 1905 it could move into a newly built barracks.

=== Formation of the Elbe National Hussar Regiment ===
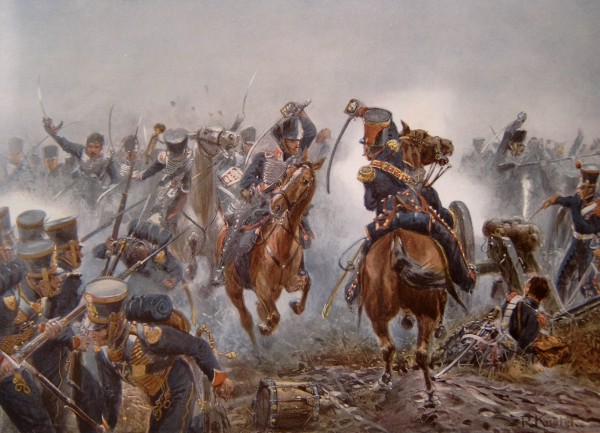
Prussian hussars in the Battle of Leipzig, 1813.

On 17 October 1813 Senior Inspector (Amtsrat) Breymann of Anhalt-Bernburg and other patriotic former Prussian officers submitted an appeal to King Friedrich Wilhelm III. They wanted to form a volunteer hussar regiment. On 28 October the officers gained the final approval of the king. By a Supreme Cabinet Order (Allerhöchste-Kabinetts-Ordre) (A.K.O.) the establishment of the regiment was ordered for 19 November 1813.

The uniform was determined by the military government of Halle/Saale. Each volunteer who joined the "Green Hussars" had to supply a horse to the regiment from his own resources. Those who could not had to pay at least 25 Thalers. Amtsrat Breymann put 20,000 talers at the disposal of the regiment.

The plan was a regiment consisting of four squadrons with 150 horses each. Three of these squadrons were to be organized in Aschersleben, and the fourth one in Salzwedel. These squadrons were also formed relatively quickly, since the Green Hussars had a brisk flow of recruits, so that after a short time the establishment of the unit was completed.

On 25 November 1813, 324 volunteers had already assembled, and at the end of year the Aschersleben squadrons were complete. Rittmeister Wilhelm von Breymann was appointed as interim commander. By a cabinet order of 20 February Major August Ludwig von Ledebur of the Garde du Corps was appointed regimental commander. At this time the regiment numbered 750 volunteers. After its complete outfitting with English arms, the regiment reported itself ready for action on 1 April 1814. A short time later it had already participated in the siege of Magdeburg.

=== 1814 ===
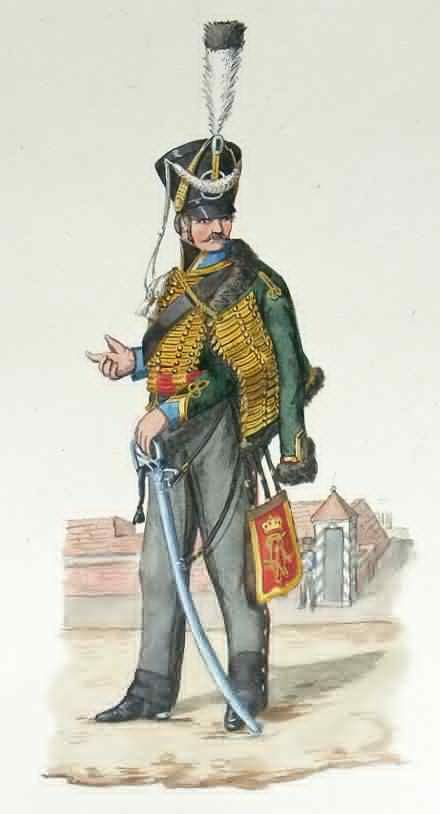
Elbnationalhusaren 1813–1815 Prussian light cavalry Uniform colour plate by F.Neumann around 1850

The newly formed regiment had its first test in the operation in front of Magdeburg. The regiment was organized into five squadrons of hussars and two of jägers. The two jäger squadrons found themselves in February 1814 along with other Prussian troops in front of the city, which was still held by the French.

On the morning of 2 April the French pushed back the two squadrons and the other outposts. The villages on the highway from Magdeburg to Halle were all occupied by French troops. Now more Prussian troops, among them the five Aschersleben hussar squadrons, were alerted. They managed to expel the French from the villages and take some prisoners. In addition, the Aschersleben squadrons took a share in the further siege of Magdeburg. After the abdication of Napoleon on 6 April 1814, it was not until 27 April 1814 that the city of Magdeburg was surrendered by the French. The Elb National Hussar Regiment then marched into the city. The two jäger squadrons were then disbanded and the rest of the regiment again withdrew into garrison.

In June 1814, the regiment was assigned to Westphalia, where it came under the command of General von Tauentzien. It was stationed in the area of Minden, Ravensberg and Lippstadt. Later it moved to the neighborhood of Höxter and Herford. From November, the regiment was located in the Kingdom of Saxony. The 5th Squadron was transferred to Cuirassier Regiment No. 8 in April 1815. The transfer of the regiment to the standing army followed on 25 May 1815 and it then received the name 10th Hussars Regiment (1 Magdeburg).

=== 1815 ===
After Napoleon's renewed seizure of power in France on 1 March 1815, the mobilization of the hussar regiment followed on 15 April 1815, which was assigned to the reserve cavalry of Prince Wilhelm of Prussia as part of the IV Corps, under the leadership of General of Infantry Bülow. The Prussian corps marched through Wetzlar and Koblenz into Belgium.

On 14 June 1815, the IV Corps was ordered by Field Marshal Prince Gebhard von Blucher to march from Liege, twenty miles westward to set up new headquarters at Hannut. Bulow however failed to detect the need for haste and failed to obey the order until the morning of 16 June. As a result, he did not arrive in time to receive a second urgent order commanding him to continue his march westwards to join the rest of the Prussian army in battle on 16 June, when the Prussian I, II and III Corps met the French army at Ligny. Bulow's IV Corps was noticeably absent.

It was not until 17 June at Gembloux, that the fresh IV Corps met up with Thielmann's retreating, but intact, III Corps moving from Ligny to the rallying point at Wavre. The 10th Hussars along with two battalions and two guns commanded by Lieutenant-Colonel von Lebedur formed the rearguard of the IV Corps, They reached the village of Mont-Saint-Guibert without enemy contact and took up positions to defend the defile with the 3rd and 5th Squadron forming the most advanced outposts. The 14th brigade of Bulow's IV Corps was positioned three miles south east of Wavre at Vieux Sart while the bulk of the IV Corps camped at Dion le Mont further to the East. By around midnight on the 17/18, Bulow's IV Corps had received orders to march at dawn (around 0400) to Chapelle-Saint-Lambert. where if battle had commenced between the Allied Forces and Napoleon's army, they would "vigorously attack the enemy's right flank". The 10th Hussars however, together with 2 infantry battalions and two guns were ordered to remain in position and hold the defile of Mont St Guibert against any French cavalry trying to cross the River Dyle. Thus the regiment was not engaged in the Battle of Waterloo. Nevertheless, there were some losses: three sergeants, 18 Hussars and 28 horses.

The reserve cavalry later received orders to maintain the connection to the 1st Army with a battalion and to push forward to Paris. On 1 July, they crossed the Seine and camped at Versailles. After the armistice with France on 9 July 1815, the Allied troops entered Paris. The duties of the regiment were to disarm the National Guard and maintain order.

The march back followed at the beginning of November, and on 28 December Aschersleben was reached. For their behavior during the fighting Captain von Hagen, a sergeant and four hussars were awarded the Iron Cross Second Class.

The 2nd Squadron was assigned Egeln and Tarthun as temporary quarters and the 4th Squadron received Cochstedt, Börnecke and Schneidlingen. The 1st and 3rd Squadrons were again housed in Aschersleben.

=== 1816–1866 ===
In 1816, in appreciation for outstanding service against the armies of Napoleon, the 10th Hussars received the distinction of a gold-embroidered regimental flag. Furthermore, the same year the 2nd Squadron was transferred to Aschersleben and the 4th squadron went to Oschersleben as a garrison for the fortress, which is the present castle of Oschersleben.

On 10 March 1823, the regiment officially received the name "10 Hussar Regiment", while the addition "Magdeburg" was lost. During the years of peace around 1827, Captain Thadden applied himself to intensive improvements in Aschersleben and the vicinity, and was consequently named the first honorary citizen of the town. When a devastating flood struck the town of Aschersleben in 1830, many people were saved by the efforts of the hussars. As of 1843, Wilhelm, the reigning Duke of Brunswick, was appointed by King Frederick William IV as honorary commander of the regiment.

In 1845, the light blue markings on the caps and uniforms, as well as the inner lining of the furs, were changed to "pompadour" red.

To restore internal order and security, the regiment was sent to Magdeburg during the 1848 March Revolution. After the revolutionary uprisings in the Electorate of Hesse, the regiment marched to Hesse in 1850 under Prince Radziwill without the affair coming to fighting.

In 1860, the addition "Magdeburg" was again applied to the 10th Hussar Regiment.

In 1862 the town of Aschersleben established a canteen in the existing armory, which later became the officers' mess. The city henceforth felt itself closely associated with its Green Hussars, and so in 1863, a grand celebration was held in recognition of the 50th anniversary of the regiment's stationing in Aschersleben.

When war came between Prussia and Austria in 1866, the hussars marched out with the strong sympathy of the population. Under Colonel Besser the regiment distinguished itself in the battles of Münchengrätz, Gitschin, Königgrätz and Pressburg.

After this campaign against Austria, the regiment was solemnly decorated on 3 March 1867 with the 'Ribbon with the Memorial Cross'. In the Franco-Prussian War of 1870/71, the regiment participated in numerous skirmishes (Wissembourg, Woerth and Spichern). In the Battle of Mars-la-Tour, it made a charge at Vionville. When the German troops had surrounded Paris, the regiment was assigned to the besieging troops. On 20 June 1871, the hussars returned to Aschersleben.

Until its disbanding on 15 June 1882 and transfer on 12 December 1882 to the 13th Hussars, the first squadron of the regiment was led by Captain Gerd von Rundstedt, the father of the later Field Marshal Gerd von Rundstedt.

In 1884, the regiment was relocated to Stendal.

In 1900, members of the regiment were assigned to the East Asian Expeditionary Corps in China during the Boxer Rebellion. A detachment of the regiment likewise strengthened the German troops in German South-West Africa in 1903–1904 in response to the uprising that had broken out there.

=== 1914–1920 ===
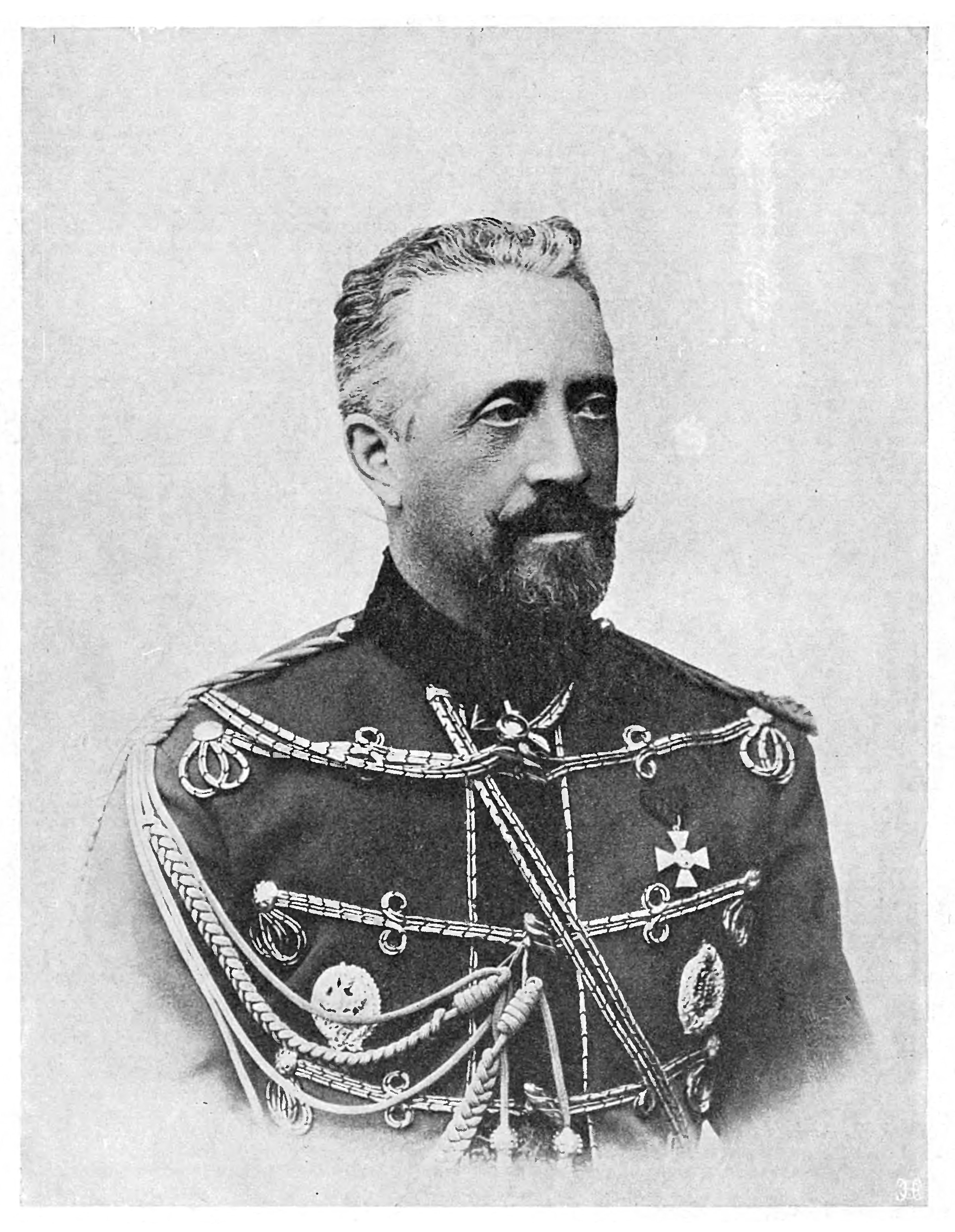
Grand Duke Nikolai Nikolaevich the Younger, chief of the regiment

In the mobilization of July 1914, the regiment was increased to six squadrons, and divided into two half regiments of three squadrons each. After initial skirmishes in the area of the Belgian border, the hussars advanced into the interior of the country and took part in the capture of Brussels on 20 August 1914. During the general forward movement of the German army, the regiment reached the Marne river, but beginning on 9 September, it had to be withdrawn back along the Aisne to Soissons. Subsequently, the regiment took part in the so-called "Race to the Sea", then already from mid-October 1914, chiefly without giving up its horses, it was employed in trench warfare. The units of the regiment spent the whole year 1915 on the Western Front in the zone of the IV Army Corps. In 1916, the half regiments were again dissolved and the individual squadrons distributed among infantry divisions, where they fulfilled their original function of reporting and reconnaissance. The year 1917 brought the loss of the regiment's horses and its conversion to a Cavalry Rifle Regiment. The 3rd and 6th Squadrons had previously been moved temporarily to the eastern front, however. There the hussars fought in eastern Galicia, Bucovina and the Carpathians. In 1918, the individual squadrons fought, distributed among different infantry units, in the defensive battles on the Western Front. In December 1918, the remnants of the regiment arrived in their garrison city of Stendal, where the 1st, 3rd and 5th Squadrons were disbanded in February 1919. The 2nd and 4th Squadrons were converted to volunteer squadrons, which were to fight in Upper Silesia against Polish insurgents. This was not necessary, however, and the two squadrons were again dissolved in 1920.

In the Reichswehr, the 3rd Squadron of the 3rd (Prussian) Cavalry Regiment in Stendal took over the regimental tradition.

=== Uniform ===
The Magdeburg hussars wore a dark green atilla with yellow lacing and a fur busby of sealskin with a pompadour-red bag of cloth. The cap had a brass chin-strap and a loose bandeau on the front with the inscription: Mit Gott für König und Vaterland (With God for King and Country). There was also a white bandoleer with a black cartridge case, sabretache and lance. The lance pennons of the soldiers were black and white, those of the NCOs white with a black Prussian eagle.

The field-gray field service uniform (M 1910), already ordered by an A.K.O. on 14 February 1907 and introduced gradually from 1909/1910, first replaced the colored uniforms on the occasion of the Imperial maneuvers of 1913. The peacetime uniform was exactly the same as the old ones, except that the laces stayed gray. The leather equipment and the boots were natural brown, and the fur cap was covered by a fabric case in what was called reed-color. The bandoleer and cartridge case were no longer used with this uniform.

=== Inclusion in the Prussian army march Collection ===
Since 1843, the regiment has been represented in the army march collection with march No. III, 32: "Trotting march of Hussar Regiment 10" which was composed by F. Münter. Münter was staff trumpeter of the regiment from 1841 to 1871, to which he presented this trotting march in 1843. Münter engaged several times in composing for his regiment and after leaving the service, he worked as a music director in Aschersleben. Certainly Wilhelm Wieprecht as a native Ascherslebener contributed to his becoming known and inclusion in the army march collection.

Until 1914, Field Artillery regiments 35 in Deutsch-Eylau and 54 in Küstrin used the march when trotting on parade. The military music historian Joachim Toeche-Mittler (1906–1996) described the piece as "a magnificent rhythm for official use".

== Regimental commanders ==
- 1814 Major August Ludwig von Ledebur
- 1830 Maximilian Franz Roth von Schreckenstein
- 1838 Leopold Schach von Wittenau
- 1845 Friedrich Adolf von Willisen
- 1848 Georg von Oppen
- 1853 Carl von Podewils
- 1855 Emil Count zu Dohna
- 1857 Hermann von Alvensleben
- 1858 Eduard von Reiman
- 1860 Hermann von Besser
- 1867 Adolf von Weise
- 1872 Friedrich von der Decken
- 1880 Oscar Baron von Wrangel
- 1881 Waldemar Baron von Troschke
- 1883 Clemens von Poncet
- 1885 Wilhelm von Restorff
- 1888 Hans von Thümen
- 1891 von Bonin
- 1895 von Festenberg
- 1900 von Schwerin
- 1900 Alfred von Kühne
- 1914 von Buttlar-Brandenfels

== See also ==
- List of Imperial German cavalry regiments
