= 13th Reserve Division =

13th Reserve Division (13. Reserve-Division)
- Active: 1914-1919
- Country: Germany
- Branch: Army
- Type: Infantry
- Size: Approx. 15,000
- Engagements: World War I: Great Retreat, Battle of Verdun

Commanders
- Notable commanders: Alfred von Kühne

The 13th Reserve Division (13. Reserve-Division) was a unit of the Imperial German Army in World War I. The division was formed on the mobilization of the German Army in August 1914. The division was disbanded in 1919, during the demobilization of the German Army after World War I. The division was a reserve division of the VII Reserve Corps and was recruited primarily in the Province of Westphalia.

== Combat chronicle ==
The 13th Reserve Division fought on the Western Front, participating in the opening German offensive which led to the Allied Great Retreat, including the capture of Maubeuge. Thereafter, the division remained in the line in the Aisne region until December 1915, when it went to the Verdun region. It entered the Battle of Verdun in February, and remained there until September. After the battle, the division remained in the line at Verdun. It went to the Champagne region at the end of 1916, and remained there into 1917, fighting in the Second Battle of the Aisne, also called the Third Battle of Champagne, in April–May 1917. After a few months near Reims, the division returned to the Verdun region in September, remaining there until April 1918 except for a month in Army reserve. The division then went to Belgium, and was in Flanders until the war's end. Allied intelligence rated the division as mediocre in 1917, but first class in 1918.

== Order of battle on mobilization ==
The order of battle of the 13th Reserve Division on mobilization was as follows:

- 25. Reserve-Infanterie-Brigade
  - Reserve-Infanterie-Regiment Nr. 13
  - Reserve-Infanterie-Regiment Nr. 56
- 28. Reserve-Infanterie-Brigade
  - Reserve-Infanterie-Regiment Nr. 39
  - Reserve-Infanterie-Regiment Nr. 57
  - Reserve-Jäger-Bataillon Nr. 7
- Reserve-Husaren-Regiment Nr. 5
- Reserve-Feldartillerie-Regiment Nr. 13
- 4.Kompanie/Westfälisches Pionier-Batl. Nr.7

== Order of battle on 12 July 1918 ==
The 13th Reserve Division was triangulated in March 1915. Over the course of the war, other changes took place, including the formation of artillery and signals commands and a pioneer battalion. The order of battle on 12 July 1918 was as follows:

- 28. Reserve-Infanterie-Brigade
  - Reserve-Infanterie-Regiment Nr. 13
  - Reserve-Infanterie-Regiment Nr. 39
  - Reserve-Infanterie-Regiment Nr. 57
- 3.Eskadron/Reserve-Husaren-Regiment Nr. 5
- Artillerie-Kommandeur 100
  - Reserve-Feldartillerie-Regiment Nr. 13
  - I.Bataillon/Reserve-Fußartillerie-Regiment Nr. 22
- Stab Pionier-Bataillon Nr. 313
  - 4.Kompanie/Westfälisches Pionier-Batl. Nr.7
  - Pionier-Kompanie Nr. 287
  - Minenwerfer-Kompanie Nr. 213
- Divisions-Nachrichten-Kommandeur 413
