= 8th Division (German Empire) =

Military unit of the Prussian/German Army

8th Division (8. Division); in 1870-71 and from August 2, 1914, 8th Infantry Division (8. Infanterie-Division)
- Active: 1818–1919
- Country: Prussia/Germany
- Branch: Army
- Type: Infantry (in peacetime included cavalry)
- Size: Approx. 15,000
- Part of: IV. Army Corps (IV. Armeekorps)
- Garrison/HQ: Erfurt (1818–1901), Halle an der Saale (1901–1919)
- Engagements: Austro-Prussian War: Königgrätz Franco-Prussian War: Beaumont, Sedan, Paris World War I: 1st Marne, Race to the Sea, Somme, Battle of Delville Wood, German spring offensive, Lys

Commanders
- Notable commanders: Maximilian von Prittwitz, Ernst II, Duke of Saxe-Altenburg

The 8th Division (8. Division) was a unit of the Prussian/German Army. It was formed in Erfurt in November 1816 as a brigade and became a division on September 5, 1818. The division was subordinated in peacetime to the IV Army Corps (IV. Armeekorps). The division was disbanded in 1919 during the demobilization of the German Army after World War I. The division was recruited primarily in the Province of Saxony, also known as Prussian Saxony and the smaller states of the German Empire around Prussian Saxony.

== Combat chronicle ==
The division fought in the Austro-Prussian War in 1866, including the Battle of Königgrätz. In the Franco-Prussian War of 1870-71, the division saw action in the battles of Beaumont and Sedan, and in the Siege of Paris.

The division was mobilized as the 8th Infantry Division in August 1914 and sent to the west for the opening campaigns of the war. It fought in the Battle of the Marne and then participated in the Race to the Sea. The division then spent time in the trenches, and fought in the Battle of the Somme in 1916. During the German spring offensive of 1918, the division fought in the Battle of the Lys. The division was rated a first-class division with high morale by Allied intelligence.

== Order of battle in the Franco-Prussian War ==
During wartime, the 8th Division, like other regular German divisions, was redesignated an infantry division. The organization of the 8th Infantry Division in 1870 at the beginning of the Franco-Prussian War was as follows:

- 15. Infanterie Brigade
  - Infanterie-Regiment Nr. 31
  - Infanterie-Regiment Nr. 71
- 16. Infanterie Brigade
  - Füsilier-Regiment Nr. 86
  - Infanterie-Regiment Nr. 96
- Husaren-Regiment Nr. 12

== Pre-World War I organization ==
German divisions underwent various organizational changes after the Franco-Prussian War. The 8th Division lost all of its original infantry regiments to other divisions and received replacement regiments. The organization of the division in 1914, shortly before the outbreak of World War I, was as follows:

- 15.Infanterie-Brigade:
  - Füsilier-Regiment General-Feldmarschall Graf Blumenthal (1. Magdeburgisches) Nr. 36
  - Anhaltisches Infanterie-Regiment Nr. 93
- 16.Infanterie-Brigade:
  - 4. Thüringisches Infanterie-Regiment Nr. 72
  - 8. Thüringisches Infanterie-Regiment Nr. 153
- 8. Kavallerie-Brigade
  - Kürassier-Regiment von Seydlitz (Magdeburgisches) Nr. 7
  - Thüringisches Husaren-Regiment Nr. 12
- 8. Feldartillerie-Brigade
  - Torgauer Feldartillerie-Regiment Nr. 74
  - Mansfelder Feldartillerie-Regiment Nr. 75
- Landwehr-Inspektion Haale an der Saale

The 36th Fusilier Regiment and the 72nd Thuringian Infantry Regiment were recruited in Prussian Saxony. The 93rd Infantry was the regiment of the Duchy of Anhalt. The 153rd Thuringian Infantry Regiment was the regiment of the Duchy of Saxe-Altenburg, but also included a battalion from Prussian Saxony.

== Order of battle on mobilization ==
On mobilization in August 1914 at the beginning of World War I, most divisional cavalry, including brigade headquarters, was withdrawn to form cavalry divisions or split up among divisions as reconnaissance units. Divisions received engineer companies and other support units from their higher headquarters. The 8th Division was again renamed the 8th Infantry Division. Its initial wartime organization was as follows:

- 15.Infanterie-Brigade:
  - Füsilier-Regiment General-Feldmarschall Graf Blumenthal (1. Magdeburgisches) Nr. 36
  - Anhaltisches Infanterie-Regiment Nr. 93
  - Magdeburgisches Jäger-Bataillon Nr. 4
- 16.Infanterie-Brigade:
  - 4. Thüringisches Infanterie-Regiment Nr. 72
  - 8. Thüringisches Infanterie-Regiment Nr. 153
- "1/2" Magdeburgisches Husaren-Regiment Nr. 10
- 8. Feldartillerie-Brigade:
  - Torgauer Feldartillerie-Regiment Nr. 74
  - Mansfelder Feldartillerie-Regiment Nr. 75
- 2./Magdeburgisches Pionier-Bataillon Nr. 4
- 3./Magdeburgisches Pionier-Bataillon Nr. 4

During the Battle of the Somme, the division was commanded by General der Infanterie Ernst II. Herzog von Sachsen-Altenburg.

== Late World War I organization ==
Divisions underwent many changes during the war, with regiments moving from division to division, and some being destroyed and rebuilt. During the war, most divisions became triangular - one infantry brigade with three infantry regiments rather than two infantry brigades of two regiments (a "square division"). An artillery commander replaced the artillery brigade headquarters, the cavalry was further reduced, the engineer contingent was increased, and a divisional signals command was created. The 8th Infantry Division's order of battle on October 31, 1918, was as follows:

- 16.Infanterie-Brigade:
  - 4. Thüringisches Infanterie-Regiment Nr. 72
  - Anhaltisches Infanterie-Regiment Nr. 93
  - 8. Thüringisches Infanterie-Regiment Nr. 153
- 5.Eskadron/Magdeburgisches Husaren-Regiment Nr. 10
- Artillerie-Kommandeur 8:
  - Torgauer Feldartillerie-Regiment Nr. 74
  - I.Bataillon/Reserve-Fußartillerie-Regiment Nr. 1
- Stab Pionier-Bataillon Nr. 118:
  - 2./Magdeburgisches Pionier-Bataillon Nr. 4
  - 5./Magdeburgisches Pionier-Bataillon Nr. 4
  - Minenwerfer-Kompanie Nr. 8
- Divisions-Nachrichten-Kommandeur 8

== In fiction ==
The German troops in the film Joyeux Noël, about the 1914 Christmas Truce, are depicted as the 93rd Regiment, belonging to 8th Division.
