= Alfred von Kühne =

General der Kavallerie Alfred von Kühne
- Born: 2 January 1853; Weimar, Prussia
- Died: 8 May 1945 (aged 92) Nazi Germany
- Allegiance: German Empire
- Branch: Imperial German Army
- Service years: 1877–1912, 1914–1919
- Rank: General of the Cavalry
- Commands: 13th Reserve Division; 226th Infantry Division
- Conflicts: World War I: Western Front
- Awards: Order of the Red Eagle (2nd Class)

Alfred von Kühne (2 January 1853 – 8 May 1945) was a Prussian General der Kavallerie who was active during World War I. He commanded the 13th Reserve Division and participated in the Siege of Maubeuge.

== Life ==
Alfred Kühne was born on 2 January 1853 in Weimar. He was the son of Prussian Oberstleutnant Gustav Kühne (1818−1880).

He entered the military as Second Lieutenant in the 19th (Oldenburg) Dragoon Regiment. As an Oberst, in 1900, Kühne became the commander of the 10th (Magdeburg) Hussars. Later, as Inspector-General of the 1st Cavalry Inspection, he was member of Reinforced Cavalry Commission. For his services Emperor Wilhelm II ennobled him in 1911. From 18 August to 18 October 1905, Kühne was posted as the commander of the 31st Cavalry Brigade. On 19 October 1905, Kühne was promoted to Generalmajor. From 2 September 1907 to 26 January 1911, Kühne was commander of the 4th Guards Cavalry Brigade in Potsdam. On February 2, 1911, Kühne was promoted to Generalleutnant. He later became the Inspector-General of the 1st Cavalry Inspection in Posen. On 14 March 1912, on his own request, Kühne retired from the army, and was awarded the Order of the Red Eagle (2nd class).

During World War I, Kühne was brought back from retirement to serve as commander of the 13th Reserve Division, which served as part of the VII Reserve Corps and the 2nd Army on the Western Front. His division was involved in most of the battles of that front in 1914. On 17 January, 1915, Kühne was given the character of a General der Kavallerie. With his division, Kühne was deployed in Verdun for the Battle of Verdun. On 4 April 1918, Kühne became the commander of the 226th Infantry Division. He stayed at this position until 10 February 1919.

== Trivial ==
- Ernest Louis, Grand Duke of Hesse had a lot of chances to meet Kühne since he had a Hessian division. He said that he is a man with a big heart who had real love for his troops. Wherever it was possible for him, he took care of everyone in the most touching way; his concern went as far as the individual man. When Kühne was transferred to the Eastern Front, a general mourned.
