= 3rd (Volunteer) Battalion, Royal Regiment of Wales =

Former infantry battalion of the British Army

C (Royal Regiment of Wales) Company 580 (Glamorgan) Transport Squadron, RLC 3rd (Volunteer) Battalion, Royal Regiment of Wales
- Active: 1 April 1971–present
- Country: United Kingdom
- Branch: British Army
- Type: Infantry and Logistics
- Size: Battalion, later Company
- Part of: 160th (Welsh) Infantry Brigade
- Battalion HQ: Maindy Barracks, Cardiff
- Mottos: Gwell angau na Chywilydd "Death rather than Dishonour"
- Anniversaries: St. David's Day, (1 March), Rorke's Drift, (22 January); Gheluvelt, (31 October)

Commanders
- Colonel-in-Chief: HRH The Prince of Wales

The 3rd (Volunteer) Battalion, The Royal Regiment of Wales (3 RRW) was an infantry battalion of the British Army, part of the Royal Regiment of Wales. The battalion was formed during the expansion of the Territorial and Army Volunteer Reserve (TAVR) in 1971, and later disbanded and merged with the 4th (V) Battalion of the same regiment to form the new 2nd (V) Battalion. The battalion's lineage is currently carried on by two company-sized units: C (Royal Regiment of Wales) Company, part of the 3rd Battalion, The Royal Welsh and 580 (Glamorgan) Transport Squadron of 157th (Wales and Midlands) Regiment, Royal Logistic Corps.

== History ==
On 1 April 1971, the 3rd (Volunteer) Battalion, The Royal Regiment of Wales was formed as part of the expansion of the Territorial and Army Volunteer Reserve (TAVR) after the major reductions of just a few years prior, in 1967. In theory the battalion was in-fact not a new formation, as the headquarters was formed by expansion of the cadre (a formation of just a few soldiers). The cadre which formed the 3rd (V) Battalion was the 3rd (Monmouthshire) Battalion, Royal Regiment of Wales, and therefore had an indirect connection to the late Monmouthshire Regiment, which itself had disbanded in 1967.

The structure of the battalion on formation was as follows:

- Battalion Headquarters, at Maindy Barracks, Cardiff
- Headquarters Company, at Maindy Barracks, Cardiff
  - Anti-Tank Platoon, in Pentre
  - Mortar Platoon, in Cwmcarn
- A Company, in Abertillery
  - Platoon, in Blackwood
- B Company, in Newport
  - Platoon, in Pontypool
- C Company, in Pontypridd
  - Platoon, in Pentre

The battalion's companies were formed from the following: Battalion HQ and HQ Company formed by redesignation of HQ Company, Welsh Volunteers; A Company new formed; B Company formed by redesignation of B (South Wales Borderers) Company, Welsh Volunteers; Pontypool Platoon formed by expansion of the 3rd (Monmouthshire) Btn, Royal Regiment of Wales; C Company formed by redesignation of C (Welch Regiment) Company in Pontypridd; and the Pentre Platoon formed by reformation of the 5th/6th (Territorial) Battalion, Welch Regiment cadre expansion.

After the 1981 Defence White Paper, the 'Home Service Force' was formed, as a home defence lightly armed group, eventually forming a company in almost every territorial battalion. The new force were primarily tasked to defence key points (KPs) throughout their area against sabotage from enemy special forces (most probably the Russian Spetsnaz). The force comprised ex-regular, ex-territorial, and ex-uniformed service personnel including those with a minimum of two years experience. As a result of this expansion, a new E (Home Service Force) Company was formed with its headquarters at Maindy Barracks in Cardiff with a platoon in Brecon.

In addition to the formation of the Home Service Force, the Territorial Army (as the TAVR was now known) was given roles of increased priority, and more emphasis was placed on supporting BAOR. Therefore, following the paper, another new company, D (City of Cardiff) Company was formed in Cardiff by expansion of the defence platoon of HQ Company on 1 April 1985.

If mobilised, the battalion would have been sent to the British Army of the Rhine as an anti-tank armoured reserve unit for the 4th Armoured Division.

== Further lineage ==
In 1991, following the end of the Cold War, the Options for Change paper was published which saw a major reorganisation of the armed forces, especially the British Army. As a result of this programme, the Home Service Force was disbanded, with E (HSF) Company disbanding in May 1992. In addition, many of the regular regiments gained their territorial battalions back, and many of the old territorial regiments disbanded.

Therefore, on 1 October 1993, the battalion was disbanded and consequently merged with the 4th (Volunteer) Battalion, Royal Regiment of Wales to form the new 2nd (Volunteer) Battalion, Royal Regiment of Wales. The following company changes consequently occurred: Battalion Headquarters and Headquarters Company merged to form the new Battalion HQ and HQ Company of the 2nd Battalion at Maindy Barracks in Cardiff; A and B Companies merged to form a new B (Rorke's Drift) Company in Cefn Fforest and Pontypool; C Company became C (Pontypridd) Company in Pontypridd and Pentre; and finally D (City of Cardiff) Company was reroled to become 580 Ambulance Squadron in Cardiff and Bridgend, which consequently amalgamated with C Company of the 4th (V) Battalion.

Following the announcement of the decision to reduce the two territorial battalions of the Royal Regiment of Wales, some Members of the Parliament of the United Kingdom (MPs) presented petitions signed by over 33,000 people of South Wales protesting the disbandment of these battalions.

=== 580 Transport Squadron, Royal Logistic Corps ===
Following the conversion of D (City of Cardiff) Company into 580 Ambulance Squadron, the new squadron came under control of the 157th (Wales and Midlands) Transport Regiment, Royal Logistic Corps (Note: This corps was now brand new, formed by the merger of the following: Royal Corps of Transport, Royal Army Ordnance Corps, Royal Pioneer Corps, Women's Royal Army Corps, and the Postal and Courier Service of the Royal Engineers.) based in Cardiff with a troop in Bridgend. In 1999 however, following the 1998 Strategic Defence Review, the squadron was transferred to the 152nd (Ulster) Ambulance Regiment, Royal Logistic Corps. The squadron was then consolidated in Bridgend, and now became the only ambulance squadron not based in Northern Ireland.

In 2006, as a result of the 2003 Defence White Paper and subsequent Future Army Structure programme, 580 Ambulance squadron was transferred back to the now redesignated 157th (Wales and Midlands) Transport, Royal Logistic Corps. The squadron then was redesignated as 580 Transport Squadron, Royal Logistic Corps and consolidated back in Cardiff. Shortly thereafter, the squadron was renamed as 580 (Glamorgan) Transport Squadron, Royal Logistic Corps, though retained its same role and stayed in Cardiff.

Under the Army 2020 programme, the squadron was consolidated in Cardiff, losing its Bridgend Troop. Today the squadron still retains its location at Maindy Barracks in Cardiff and is still part of 157th (Welsh) Transport Regiment, Royal Logistic Corps.

=== The Royal Welsh ===
Following the reductions of the Options for Change, A and B Companies of the old 3rd RRW formed the new B (Rorke's Drift) Company in Cefn Fforest and Pontypool along with C (Pontypridd) Company in Pontypridd and Pentre. These companies however wouldn't last long as on 1 July 1999, as a result of the 1998 Strategic Defence Review, the 2nd (V) Battalion, Royal Regiment of Wales was disbanded to form part of the new Royal Welsh Regiment. As a consequence, B (Rorke's Drift) Company was disbanded, while HQ Company and C Companies merged to form the new C (Royal Regiment of Wales) Company at Maindy Barracks in Cardiff with a platoon in Pontypridd.

Under the Future Army Structure announced in 2004, the Royal Regiment of Wales was merged with the Royal Regiment of Wales and Royal Welch Fusiliers to form the new Royal Welsh. As a result of this merger, the Royal Welsh Regiment became the 3rd (Volunteer) Battalion, The Royal Welsh on 1 March 2006 with no changes in companies.

Under the Army 2020 programme announced in 2012, the company was to be consolidated, and is currently based at the Army Reserve Centre on The Broadway in Pontypridd. Under the Army 2020 Refine announced in 2017, the company was expanded and a new platoon was formed at the Bethesda Street drill hall in Georgetown, Merthyr Tydfil (Mid Glamorgan).
