= Royal Welsh Regiment =

Royal Welsh Regiment 3rd Battalion, The Royal Welsh
- Active: 1999–2006
- Allegiance: United Kingdom
- Branch: British Army
- Type: Line Infantry
- Role: Infantry

The Royal Welsh Regiment was an infantry regiment of the Territorial Army in the United Kingdom. It existed from 1999, until it was re-designated as the 3rd Battalion, The Royal Welsh in 2006.

== History ==
The regiment was formed in 1999 as part of the restructuring of the TA by the amalgamation of the two Welsh TA battalions, namely: 3rd (Volunteer) Battalion, Royal Welch Fusiliers; and 2nd (Volunteer) Battalion, Royal Regiment of Wales Its initial structure was as follows:

- HQ Company, at Maindy Barracks, Cardiff
- A (Royal Welch Fusiliers) Company, at Wrexham and Queensferry
  (from HQ and A Companies, 3rd Battalion, Royal Welch Fusiliers)
- B (Royal Regiment of Wales) Company, at Swansea
  (from A Company, 2nd Battalion, Royal Regiment of Wales)
- C (Royal Regiment of Wales) Company, at Maindy Barracks, Cardiff and Pontypridd
  (from HQ and C Companies, 2nd Battalion, Royal Regiment of Wales)
- D (Royal Welch Fusiliers) Company, at Colwyn Bay and Caernarfon
  (from B and D Companies, 3rd Battalion, Royal Welch Fusiliers)

No new cap badge was created for this regiment, soldiers wore their former regimental cap badge or were badged according to the company they joined.

== 3rd Battalion, Royal Welsh ==
As part of the restructuring of the infantry announced in 2004, the Royal Welsh Regiment became the TA battalion of the new amalgamated regiment of Wales, the Royal Welsh, on the 1 March 2006.

Companies and platoons reported in December 2020 include:

- Headquarters Company, at Maindy Barracks, Cardiff
  - Corps of Drums at Raglan Barracks, Newport
- B Company, at Swansea
  - Platoon, at Aberystwyth
- C Company, at Pontypridd
  - Mortar Platoon, at Merthyr Tydfil
- D Company, at Colwyn Bay
  - Anti-Tank Platoon, at Hightown Barracks, Wrexham
