= Georg von Waldersee =

Prussian general (1860–1932)

Georg Friedrich Wilhelm Graf von Waldersee
- Born: 1 September 1860; Brandenburg an der Havel, Kingdom of Prussia
- Died: 7 September 1932 (aged 72); Ivenack, Mecklenburg-Schwerin, Weimar Republic
- Military career
- Allegiance: German Empire
- Branch: Imperial German Army
- Rank: Generalleutnant
- Commands: 17th Dragoon Regiment; 3rd Cavalry Brigade; Chief of Staff, 8th Army
- Conflicts: World War I: Eastern Front; Battle of Gumbinnen

Georg Friedrich Wilhelm Graf von Waldersee (1860–1932) was an Imperial German Army general in World War I. He was a nephew of Field Marshal Alfred von Waldersee.

== Life ==
Waldersee was born in the Kingdom of Prussia as the son of Colonel Georg Ernest von Waldersee, who died during the Franco-Prussian War. He even had ancestors of House of Hohenzollern. He entered the Prussian Army on 14 May 1880 as a Second Lieutenant. After 8 years of service, Waldersee was promoted to Premier-Lieutenant. Later he became the chief of staff of VII Corps, led by Moritz von Bissing. Later he became the commander of the 17th Dragoon Regiment. On 22 April 1912 Waldersee was promoted to Generalmajor. After the promotion he became the commander of the 3rd Cavalry Brigade. Then he became one of the Senior Quartermasters of the German General Staff as a successor of Oskar von Hutier. In World War I, Waldersee became the chief of staff of the 8th Army. However as the commander, Maximilian von Prittwitz, was replaced, Waldersee was also replaced by Erich Ludendorff. After being replaced, he later became the military governor of Sevastopol. He lived until 1932 and died in Germany.
