= 7th Division (German Empire) =

Military unit of the Prussian/German Army

7th Division (7. Division); in 1870-71 and from August 2, 1914, 7th Infantry Division (7. Infanterie-Division)
- Active: 1818–1919
- Country: Prussia/Germany
- Branch: Army
- Type: Infantry (in peacetime included cavalry)
- Size: Approx. 15,000
- Part of: IV. Army Corps (IV. Armeekorps)
- Garrison/HQ: Magdeburg (1818–1919)
- Engagements: Austro-Prussian War: Königgrätz Franco-Prussian War: Beaumont, Sedan, Paris World War I: Liège, Race to the Sea, Somme, Battle of Delville Wood, German spring offensive, Lys, Hundred Days Offensive, Meuse-Argonne Offensive

Commanders
- Notable commanders: Karl Eberhard Herwarth von Bittenfeld, Julius von Groß genannt Schwarzhoff, Friedrich von Bernhardi

The 7th Division (7. Division) was a unit of the Prussian/German Army. It was formed in Magdeburg in November 1816 as a brigade and became a division on September 5, 1818. The division was subordinated in peacetime to the IV Army Corps (IV. Armeekorps). The division was disbanded in 1919 during the demobilization of the German Army after World War I. The division was recruited primarily in the Province of Saxony, also known as Prussian Saxony.

== Combat chronicle ==
The division fought in the Austro-Prussian War in 1866, including the Battle of Königgrätz. In the Franco-Prussian War of 1870–71, the division saw action in the battles of Beaumont and Sedan, and in the Siege of Paris.

The division was mobilized as the 7th Infantry Division in August 1914 and sent to the west for the opening campaigns of the war. It fought in the siege of the Belgian fortifications at Liège, and then participated in the subsequent march into France and the Race to the Sea. The division then spent time in the trenches, and fought in the Battle of the Somme in 1916. During the German spring offensive of 1918, the division fought in the Battle of the Lys. It then fought in the defensive battles against the Allied offensives, including the Hundred Days Offensive and the Meuse-Argonne Offensive. The division was rated a first-class division by Allied intelligence.

== Order of battle in the Franco-Prussian War ==
During wartime, the 7th Division, like other regular German divisions, was redesignated an infantry division. The organization of the 7th Infantry Division in 1870 at the beginning of the Franco-Prussian War was as follows:

- 13. Infanterie Brigade
  - Infanterie-Regiment Nr. 26
  - Infanterie-Regiment Nr. 66
- 14. Infanterie Brigade
  - Infanterie-Regiment Nr. 27
  - Anhaltisches Infanterie-Regiment Nr. 93
- Jäger-Bataillon Nr. 4
- Dragoner-Regiment Nr. 7

== Pre-World War I organization ==
German divisions underwent various organizational changes after the Franco-Prussian War. The 7th Division exchanged its regiment from the Duchy of Anhalt for the Hanoverian 165th Infantry Regiment, broadening its recruiting area The organization of the division in 1914, shortly before the outbreak of World War I, was as follows:

- 13. Infanterie Brigade
  - Infanterie-Regiment Fürst Leopold von Anhalt-Dessau (1. Magdeburgisches) Nr. 26
  - 3. Magdeburgisches Infanterie-Regiment Nr. 66
- 14. Infanterie Brigade
  - Infanterie-Regiment Prinz Louis Ferdinand von Preußen (2. Magdeburgisches) Nr. 27
  - 5. Hannoversches Infanterie-Regiment Nr. 165
- 7. Kavallerie-Brigade
  - Magdeburgisches Husaren-Regiment Nr. 10
  - Ulanen-Regiment Hennigs von Treffenfeld (Altmärkisches) Nr. 16
- 7. Feldartillerie-Brigade
  - Feldartillerie-Regiment Prinz-Regent Luitpold von Bayern (Magdeburgisches) Nr. 4
  - Altmärkisches Feldartillerie-Regiment Nr. 40

== Order of battle on mobilization ==
On mobilization in August 1914 at the beginning of World War I, most divisional cavalry, including brigade headquarters, was withdrawn to form cavalry divisions or split up among divisions as reconnaissance units. Divisions received engineer companies and other support units from their higher headquarters. The 7th Division was again renamed the 7th Infantry Division. Its initial wartime organization was as follows:

- 13.Infanterie-Brigade:
  - Infanterie-Regiment Fürst Leopold von Anhalt-Dessau (1. Magdeburgisches) Nr. 26
  - 3. Magdeburgisches Infanterie-Regiment Nr. 66
- 14.Infanterie-Brigade:
  - Infanterie-Regiment Prinz Louis Ferdinand von Preußen (2. Magdeburgisches) Nr. 27
  - 5. Hannoversches Infanterie-Regiment Nr. 165
- "1/2" Magdeburgisches Husaren-Regiment Nr. 10
- 7. Feldartillerie-Brigade:
  - Feldartillerie-Regiment Prinz-Regent Luitpold von Bayern (Magdeburgisches) Nr. 4
  - Altmärkisches Feldartillerie-Regiment Nr. 40
- 1./Magdeburgisches Pionier-Bataillon Nr. 4

== Late World War I organization ==
Divisions underwent many changes during the war, with regiments moving from division to division, and some being destroyed and rebuilt. During the war, most divisions became triangular - one infantry brigade with three infantry regiments rather than two infantry brigades of two regiments (a "square division"). An artillery commander replaced the artillery brigade headquarters, the cavalry was further reduced, the engineer contingent was increased, and a divisional signals command was created. The 7th Infantry Division's order of battle on April 1, 1918, was as follows:

- 14.Infanterie-Brigade:
  - Infanterie-Regiment Fürst Leopold von Anhalt-Dessau (1. Magdeburgisches) Nr. 26
  - 5. Hannoversches Infanterie-Regiment Nr. 165
  - Thüringisches Infanterie-Regiment Nr. 393
  - Musketier-Bataillon Nr. 1
- 2.Eskadron/Magdeburgisches Husaren-Regiment Nr. 10
- Artillerie-Kommandeur 7:
  - Altmärkisches Feldartillerie-Regiment Nr. 40
  - I.Bataillon/Reserve-Fußartillerie-Regiment Nr. 20
- Stab Magdeburgisches Pionier-Bataillon Nr. 4:
  - 1./Magdeburgisches Pionier-Bataillon Nr. 4
  - 3./Magdeburgisches Pionier-Bataillon Nr. 4
  - Minenwerfer-Kompanie Nr. 7
- Divisions-Nachrichten-Kommandeur 7

== Bibliography ==
- 7. Infanterie-Division - Der erste Weltkrieg
- Claus von Bredow, bearb., Historische Rang- und Stammliste des deutschen Heeres (1905)
- Hermann Cron et al., Ruhmeshalle unserer alten Armee (Berlin, 1935)
- Hermann Cron, Geschichte des deutschen Heeres im Weltkriege 1914-1918 (Berlin, 1937)
- Günter Wegner, Stellenbesetzung der deutschen Heere 1815-1939. (Biblio Verlag, Osnabrück, 1993), Bd. 1
- Histories of Two Hundred and Fifty-One Divisions of the German Army Which Participated in the War (1914-1918). Document (United States. War Department) No. 905. Washington, D.C.: Government Printing Office. 1920. OCLC 1387464.
