= 12th (Thuringian) Hussars =

Military unit

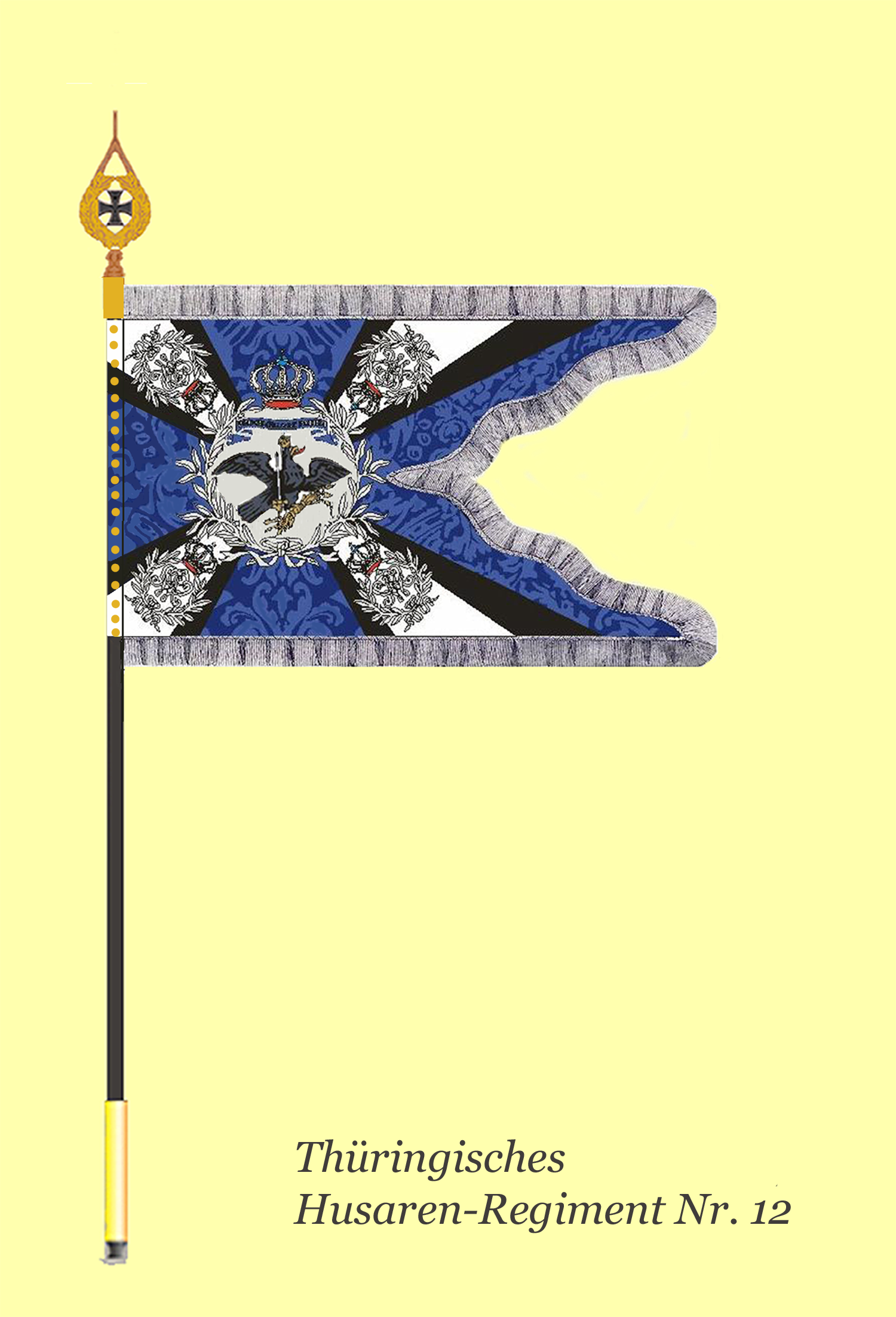
Flag of the regiment

The 12th (Thuringian) Hussar Regiment (German: Thüringisches Husaren-Regiment Nr. 12) was a German Hussar regiment active during the Napoleonic Wars, the German revolutions of 1848–1849, the Austro-Prussian War, the Franco-Prussian War, and World War I. The unit was disbanded in 1920.

== Actions ==
On 30 July 1791 the regiment was established as a new hussar unit in the Royal Saxon Army. The regiment was deployed in Mühlberg/Elbe by the end of the September 1791.

As the Kingdom of Saxony was involved in the Napoleonic Wars, the regiment participated in Battle of Jena–Auerstedt on the French side. When Napoleon abdicated and Saxony lost territory to the victorious Kingdom of Prussia, the regiment was reestablished as a Prussian Army regiment. On 8 July 1815, the regiment participated in the invasion of Paris led by Gebhard Leberecht von Blücher.

During the German revolutions of 1848–1849, the regiment participated in suppressing the revolution as part of the 1st Division and the II Corps.

During the Austro-Prussian War, the regiment was subordinated to the 2nd Cavalry Division in the First Army. The regiment participated in the Battle of Königgrätz and the Battle of Blumenau. In the Franco-Prussian War, the regiment fought in the Battle of Beaumont and the Battle of Sedan.

During World War I, the regiment was first deployed on the Western Front and participated in the German invasion of Belgium. In November 1914 it was transferred to the Eastern Front and took part in the battles in northern Poland. In May 1915 it saw service in Kurland and Lithuania and then came to Romania. By early 1917 it was involved in the fighting on the Southeast Front. In February 1917 it was transferred back to the western front. There it gave up the horses and was transformed and downsized into a dismounted riflemen battalion. After receiving infantry training they took part in defensive battles in Flanders until the end of the war.

Afterwards the unit was officially disbanded in 1920.

== Garrison ==
The garrison placements of the regiment was as following:

- 1815: Gleiwitz
- 1817: Eisleben
- 1835: Merseburg
- 1849: Saarbrücken
- 1850: Merseburg
- 1901: Torgau

== See also ==
- List of Imperial German cavalry regiments
