= Maximilian von Prittwitz =

German general (1848–1917)

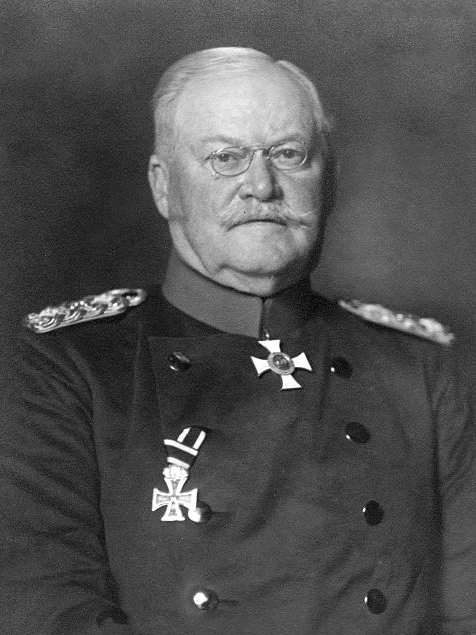
- Prittwitz in 1915
- Born: 27 November 1848; Bernstadt, Province of Silesia, Kingdom of Prussia now Bierutów, Lower Silesian Voivodeship, Poland
- Died: 29 March 1917 (aged 68); Berlin, Kingdom of Prussia, German Empire
- Military career
- Allegiance: Prussia; German Empire
- Branch: Prussian Army; Imperial German Army
- Service years: 1866–1914
- Rank: Generaloberst
- Commands: 8th Division; XVI Corps; Eighth Army
- Conflicts: Austro-Prussian War; Franco-Prussian War; World War I: Eastern Front; Battle of Gumbinnen

Maximilian "Max" Wilhelm Gustav Moritz von Prittwitz und Gaffron (27 November 1848 – 29 March 1917) was an Imperial German general. He fought in the Austro-Prussian War, the Franco-Prussian War, and briefly in the First World War.

== Family ==
Prittwitz came from an old aristocratic Silesian family in Bernstadt (present-day Bierutów, Poland). His father was Gustav von Prittwitz, a Prussian general, and his mother was Elisabeth von Klass.

On 19 May 1874 Prittwitz married Olga von Dewitz (30 August 1848 – 9 January 1938), the daughter of Kurt von Dewitz (a landowner) and of his wife Euphemia, née von der Groeben. Their only son died on 23 May 1918.

== Early military career ==
After attending a school in Oels, Prittwitz joined the 3rd Guard Grenadiers (German: Regiment 3. Garde-Grenadier-Regiment Königin Elisabeth) and fought in the Austro-Prussian War of 1866. He was then commissioned as a junior officer in the 38th (Silesian) Fusiliers (German: Schlesische Füsilier-Regiment Nr. 38), with which regiment he served in the Franco-Prussian War of 1870-1871. After attending the Prussian Military Academy, Prittwitz was appointed to the 6th Jaeger Battalion. He subsequently held a number of General Staff positions, interspersed with company- and battalion-commander appointments in various infantry regiments. In 1913 he was appointed as Generaloberst (full general), in command of the XVI Corps in Metz.

== World War I ==
On 2 August 1914, at the outbreak of the First World War, Prittwitz was appointed commander of the Eighth Army and assigned to defend East Prussia from an expected Russian attack.

Correctly surmising that the combined Russian armies could overwhelm his numerically inferior force, he set about defeating Rennenkampf and Samsonov in detail. This meant temporarily ceding some territory. As the Russians advanced, they became separated by the Masurian Lakes, unable to work together. Meanwhile the Germans fell back on interior lines and the excellent German rail system.

When the unexpectedly swift Russian invasion gained early success in the Battle of Gumbinnen (20 August 1914) and threatened his rear, Prittwitz suggested a retreat to the west of the Vistula. This would have meant abandoning East Prussia, an action which the German General Staff found unacceptable. Additionally, commander of the I Corps Hermann von François complained to the General Staff that his superior was panicking; the General Staff concurred in this assessment. On 23 August 1914 Moltke the Younger promptly appointed Paul von Hindenburg to replace Prittwitz as Eighth Army commander. Hindenburg, along with Erich Ludendorff as replacement for Chief of Staff Georg von Waldersee, then successively destroyed the two invading Russian armies at the Battles of Tannenberg (23–30 August 1914) and the Masurian Lakes (2–16 September 1914). Hindenberg and Ludendorff succeeded because of the extensive preparations Prittwitz had put into play, and they propagandized their victory to gain political power.

Prittwitz retired to Berlin, where he lived for three years before dying of a heart attack. He was buried in the Invalids' Cemetery (Invalidenfriedhof) in Berlin.

== Honours and awards ==
- Kingdom of Prussia:
  - Knight of the Red Eagle, 4th Class with Swords, 1866; 3rd Class with Bow and Swords on Ring, 18 January 1882; with Crown
  - Knight of the Royal Crown Order, 4th Class with Swords, 1866; 3rd Class with Swords on Ring, 18 January 1879; 1st Class
  - Iron Cross (1870), 2nd Class
  - Knight of Honour of the Johanniter Order, 1872; Knight of Justice, 1876
  - Service Award Cross
  - Knight of the Black Eagle, with Collar 07.01.1913
- Anhalt: Grand Cross of the Order of Albert the Bear
- Baden:
  - Grand Cross of the Zahringer Lion, with Oak Leaves, 1907
  - Grand Cross of the Order of Berthold the First
- Kingdom of Bavaria:
  - Grand Cross of the Military Merit Order
  - Prince Regent Luitpold Medal on Band of Jubilee Medal
- (Saxe-Coburg and Gotha) (Duchy of Saxe-Altenburg) (Saxe-Meiningen) Ernestine duchies: Grand Cross of the Saxe-Ernestine House Order
- Mecklenburg:
  - Grand Cross of the Wendish Crown, with Golden Crown
  - Commander of the Griffon
- Oldenburg: Commander of Honour of the Order of Duke Peter Friedrich Ludwig
- Kingdom of Saxony: Grand Cross of the Albert Order, with Golden Star
- Schaumburg-Lippe: Cross of Honour of the House Order of Schaumburg-Lippe, 1st Class
- (Austrian Empire) (Kingdom of Hungary) Austria-Hungary: Knight of the Iron Crown, 2nd Class, 1895
- Chile: Medal of the Merit, 1st Class

Military offices
Preceded by Formed from I Army Inspectorate (I. Armee-Inspektion)	Commander, 8th Army; 2 August 1914 – 23 August 1914	Succeeded by Generaloberst Paul von Hindenburg
