= Günther Franz =

German agrarian historian (1902–1992)

Günther Siegfried Franz Prof. Dr. phil. habil.
- Günther Franz as rector of the University of Hohenheim (1964)
- Born: May 13, 1902; Hamburg, German Empire
- Died: July 22, 1992 (aged 90); Stuttgart, Baden-Württemberg, Germany
- Occupations: Historian, University professor, SS Officer
- Years active: 1926-1986
- Known for: The German Peasants' War
- Spouse: Annelies Eckhardt (1903 - )

Academic background
- Education: Marburg University, University of Göttingen, Ludwig-Maximilians-Universität München
- Alma mater: University of Göttingen
- Thesis: Bismarcks Nationalgefühl (1925)
- Doctoral advisor: Arnold Oskar Meyer
- Other advisor: Wilhelm Mommsen

Academic work
- Discipline: Social history
- Sub-discipline: History of agriculture
- Institutions: University of Rostock, Heidelberg University, University of Jena, Reichsuniversität Straßburg, Ahnenerbe, University of Hohenheim
- Doctoral students: Hermann Löffler, Paul Mylius

Günther Franz (13 May 1902 – 22 July 1992) was a German historian and academic known for his work in agricultural history and the history of the German Peasants' War. He was a leading figure in shaping postwar German agrarian history alongside contemporaries such as Wilhelm Abel and Friedrich Lütge, and his book Der deutsche Bauernkrieg was long regarded as a standard work on the subject. Franz held professorships at several universities, including Heidelberg, Jena, and the Reichsuniversität Straßburg during World War II, where his research and academic roles intersected with National Socialist institutions. During the Nazi era, he was a member of the Nazi Party and the SS, and some of his work from that period incorporated ideological elements aligned with Nazi expansionist and antisemitic views. After the war, Franz underwent denazification, later resumed an academic career, and served as rector of the University of Hohenheim, where he continued to influence the fields of agricultural economics and agricultural history.

== Life ==
=== Early years ===
Franz's father, Gottlob Franz (1855 – 1903), had been the director of a textile factory in Hamburg, but was killed in an industrial accident before Franz's first birthday. His widowed mother relocated to Greiz in the Principality of Reuss-Greiz (now Thuringia), where her family operated a successful paper mill. Franz completed his elementary and secondary schooling in Greiz, and at the age of twelve he followed in the footsteps of his elder brothers by joining the Wandervogel. After the outbreak of the First World War, Franz's eldest brother was killed in France in 1915, aged only 19. The experience of having grown up during the Great War meant that Gunther belonged to what in German is called the Kriegsjugendgeneration or "war-youth generation." Franz graduated from high school in 1921, after which he went to Marburg University to study history and German literature. Two semesters later in 1922, he transferred to the University of Göttingen. He spent the winter of 1923-4 at the Ludwig-Maximilians-Universität München on a guest semester, and it was during this time in Munich that he began his writings on Bismarck, which would eventually become his dissertation. In 1925, at the age of 23, Franz received his doctorate from Arnold Oskar Meyer at the University of Göttingen. Immediately after his promotion, he seems to have begun an in-depth study of the German Peasants' War, which research led what would become the subject of his habilitation. Due to his close connection and association with this specific conflict and period in German history, Franz was affectionately given the nickname Bauern-Franz (Farmers' Franz) by his students and contemporaries. In 1927 he went to work at the University of Göttingen as an assistant professor under Mayer, and in 1930, he received his habilitation from Wilhelm Mommsen at Marburg University. In the winter semester of 1934/35, Franz sat in for Wilhelm Schüssler in his chair at the University of Rostock. Franz's subsequent career was substantially augmented by the influence of his brother-in-law, the legal historian and SS-Sturmbannführer Karl August Eckhardt, who, from 1934 onward, was a principal advisor to the Reich Ministry of Science, Education and Culture (German: Reichswissenschaftsministeriums).

In the spring of 1935, Franz succeeded Karl Hampe in his chair of medieval history at the University of Heidelberg. Prior to this appointment, Franz had published extensively on the Peasants' War, indeed, the definitive work on the subject, but had otherwise written very little on wider medieval history. At Heidelberg, his academic interests took a turn towards population history, which eventually led him to undertake a study of the Thirty Years War. Also at Heidelberg, in 1939, Franz founded a regional studies society, called the Institut für Fränkisch-Pfälzische Landes- und Volksforschung, which still exists today, as the Institut für Fränkisch-Pfälzische Geschichte und Landeskunde. In 1936, Franz succeeded Alexander Cartellieri as chair of Medieval History at the University of Jena where he was instrumental in the founding of another regional history society, the Anstalt für geschichtliche Landeskunde. Jena was also where Franz first made the acquaintance of fellow historian Erich Maschke, with whom he would form a lifelong friendship, and together they began to publish the series "Arbeiten zur Landes- und Volksforschung." At the height of the Nazi-era, from 1941 to 1945, Franz taught at the Reichsuniversität Straßburg, specializing in "the history of the Reformation and the Thirty Years' War" and in particular "the study of the German national body.

=== Relationship with the Nazi regime ===
As an avowed Nazi, Franz was a member of the Nazi Party and the Sturmabteilung from 1933. In May 1933 he also became a member of the National Socialist Teachers League and in November of that year, a member of the National Socialist People's Welfare. On 11 November 1933, Franz was one of the signatories of the Vow of allegiance of the Professors of the German Universities and High-Schools to Adolf Hitler and the National Socialistic State. in 1935, Franz published a diatribe against the historical establishment, particularly Walter Goetz and the Historical Commission, whose support for the previous Republican government had already soured the Nazi regime against them. In it, he declared a fervent hope that they "cleanse themselves of all the dross that still clings to them, in order to be able to devote themselves fully to the new tasks that are set for them today." By 1937, Franz was awarded the rank of Rottenführer, and posted to the SS Race and Settlement Main Office. After his promotion to Untersturmführer in 1941, Franz was transferred to the Main Office and given supervisory role dealing directly with the Sicherheitsdienst, the Nazi secret police. Starting in 1939, Franz was a member of the personal staff of Nazi Party's chief ideologue, Alfred Rosenberg, as well as a member of staff at the SS-Ahnenerbe. In 1943, he was promoted to Ober- and, in the same year, to Hauptsturmführer. In his dual role as a professor at the Reichsuniversität Strasbourg and as a staff member in Franz Six's Abteilung Gegnererforschung (Opposition Research Department) supervised a number of dissertations and postdoctoral theses by SD members, thus implementing the overall SS strategy of infiltrating and reforming university historical scholarship.

In many of his works during the Nazi era, Franz provided an ideological basis for the German expansionist policy in the East. He also propagated the ahistorical and antisemitic idea of a Jewish conspiracy to destabilize the Roman Catholic Church, which then triggered the Reformation and the Thirty Years' War. In 1937, he justified Nazi discrimination and persecution of Jews on the grounds that "the Catholic Church has for centuries enacted laws against the Jews which in their basic provisions are completely consistent with the racial laws of the Third Reich." In a nod to his own area of specialty, Franz interpreted Hitler's seizure of power as the completion of the goals of the Peasants' War of 1525. In his role as the scientific coordinator for the RHSA (Reich Security Main Office)'s aforementioned Gegnerforschung, or Opposition Research Department, Franz initiated and supervised publications on the Jewish Question in particular, which were published in SS and RSHA publication series, including the SS-Leitheft.

=== The postwar period ===
After the war, Franz went into hiding in Hesse for several years. It was not until the end of 1948 that he initiated his denazification proceedings in Marburg, from which he emerged as a Minderbelasteter in July 1949. After Franz initiated the transfer of his proceedings to North Rhine-Westphalia, the Detmold court denazified him at the end of 1949 as a Mitläufer (Cat. IV). As a result of a general amnesty, Franz was reclassified as Entlastete (Cat. V) shortly thereafter. In his unpublished memoirs, written in 1982, Franz himself admitted that his original classification as a Minderbelasteter "was basically correct." Publicly, however, he denied that he had ever allowed himself to be "taken in" by National Socialism. Franz was one of the co-founders of the Ranke-Gesellschaft in 1950 and also became editor of the journal Das Historisch-Politische Buch published by the society. After 1945, he worked for the Lower Saxony Office for Regional Planning and Statistics, which was headed by his old friend Kurt Brüning. It took until 1957, longer than for any other historian incriminated, for Franz to be appointed to a chair again. At the Landwirtschaftlichen Hochschule in Stuttgart-Hohenheim (today the University of Hohenheim), he took over the newly created chair of agricultural history. He served as rector there from 1963 to 1967.

In 1952, Franz co-founded, and from 1973-1975 co-edited, the Biographische Wörterbuch zur Deutschen Geschichte which was still being released in new editions as of 1995, and was used as a source by the complilers of the Deutsche Biographische Enzyklopädie.

== Family ==
Franz married Annelies Eckhardt, the sister of Karl August Eckhardt and daughter of Wilhelm Eckhardt, both prominent German historians. Together they had two sons. The elder, Eckhart G. Franz (1931–2015), continued in the family tradition and trained as a historian and an archivist, and served as the head of the Hessian State Archives Darmstadt from 1971 to 1996. The younger, Gunther Franz (1942-), is a theologian and historian, who from 1982 to 2007 served as the head librarian and head archivist of the Municipal Archives in Trier.

== Scholarly impact ==
Franz is considered a pioneer of social history; above all, he gave important momentum to research into the history of the Reformation. Franz's account Der Deutsche Bauernkrieg (The German Peasant War), published in 1933, was still considered the standard work of research on that subject in West Germany forty years later. The work appeared in a 12th edition in 1984. According to Christopher Clark, Franz's work Der Dreißigjährige Krieg und das deutsche Volk remains the "standard work on mortality rates." Accusations of exaggeration in the intervening period by Sigfrid Henry Steinberg and Hans-Ulrich Wehler, for example, have been invalidated by new studies, according to Clark. Indeed, even more recent accounts commend Der Dreißigjährige Krieg und das deutsche Volk as groundbreaking.

== Publications ==
=== As author ===
- Der deutsche Bauernkrieg 1525. Herausgegeben in zeitgenössischen Zeugnissen (in German). Berlin: Deutsche Buch-Gemeinschaft. 1926. ISBN 9783534034246.
- Bücherkunde zur Geschichte des deutschen Bauerntums. Der Forschungsdienst (in German). Vol. 9. Berlin: Neumann. 1938.
- von Raumer, Kurt; Schieder, Theodor, eds. (1943). "Geschichte und Rasse. Bemerkungen zur deutschen Geschichte in der Zeit der Glaubenskämpfe". Stufen und Wandlungen der deutschen Einheit (in German). Stuttgart: Deutsche Verlags-Anstalt. pp. 75–96.
- Bücherkunde zur deutschen Geschichte. Berlin: Oldenbourg Wissenschaftsverlag. 1951. ISBN 9783486780062.
- Verwaltungsgeschichte des Regierungsbezirks Lüneburg (in German). Bremen: Dorn Verlag. 1955.
- Der deutsche Landwarenhandel (in German). Hannover: Strohte. 1960.
- Quellen zur Geschichte des deutschen Bauernstandes in der Neuzeit. Monumenta Germaniae Historica (in German). Vol. 11. Darmstadt: Wissenschaftliche Buchgesellschaft. 1963.
- Quellen zur Geschichte des deutschen Bauernstandes im Mittelalter. Monumenta Germaniae Historica (in German). Vol. 31. Darmstadt: Wissenschaftliche Buchgesellschaft. 1974.
- Deutsches Bauerntum im Mittelalter (in German). Darmstadt: Wissenschaftliche Buchgesellschaft. 1976. ISBN 3-534-06405-4.
- Der Dreißigjährige Krieg und das deutsche Volk: Untersuchungen zur Bevölkerungs- und Agrargeschichte (in German). Berlin: De Gruyter. 1979. ISBN 3-437-50233-6.

=== As editor ===
- Staatsverfassungen: Eine Sammlung wichtiger Verfassungen der Vergangenheit und Gegenwart in Urtext und Übersetzung. Berlin: Oldenbourg Wissenschaftsverlag. 1950. ISBN 9783486779141.
- with Hanns Hubert Hoffmann: Deutsche Führungsschichten in der Neuzeit: Eine Zwischenbilanz. Büdinger Vorträge 1978. Berlin: Oldenbourg Wissenschaftsverlag. 1980. ISBN 9783486417708.
