= Order of the Red Eagle =

Prussian order of chivalry

Order of the Red Eagle Roter Adlerorden
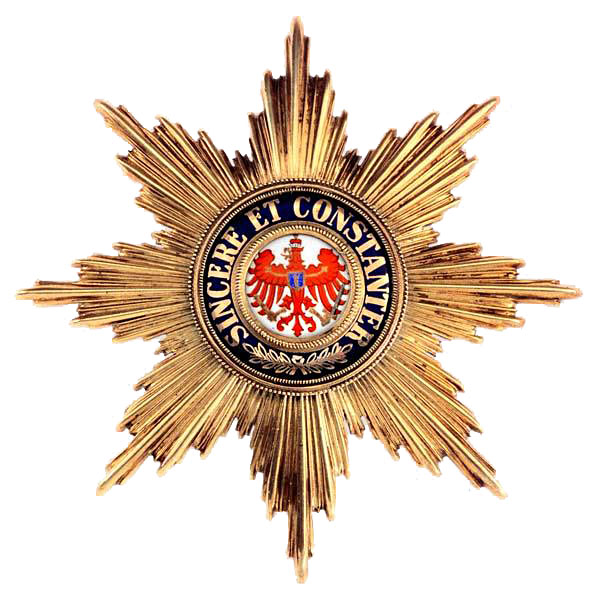
- Grand Cross breast star

Awarded by the Kingdom of Prussia
- Type: State Order
- Established: 12 June 1792 (in Prussia)
- Eligibility: Civilians and military, Prussian and foreign, with rank/status determining which grade one received
- Criteria: Merit
- Status: Obsolete
- Sovereign: Georg Friedrich, Prince of Prussia

Precedence
- Next (higher): Order of Merit of the Prussian Crown
- Next (lower): Order of the Crown
- Ribbon of the order

The Order of the Red Eagle (German: Roter Adlerorden) was an order of chivalry of the Kingdom of Prussia. It was awarded to both military personnel and civilians, to recognize valor in combat, excellence in military leadership, long and faithful service to the kingdom, or other achievements. As with most German and other European orders, the Order of the Red Eagle could be awarded only to commissioned officers or civilians of approximately equivalent status. However, there was a medal of the order, which could be awarded to non-commissioned officers and enlisted men, lower ranking civil servants and other civilians.

== History ==
The predecessor to the Order of the Red Eagle was founded on 17 November 1705, by the Margrave Georg Wilhelm of Brandenburg-Bayreuth as the Ordre de la Sincérité. This soon fell into disuse but was revived in 1712 in Brandenburg-Bayreuth and again in 1734 in Brandenburg-Ansbach, where it first received the name of "Order of the Brandenburg Red Eagle". The statutes were changed in 1777 and the order named therein as the "Order of the Red Eagle". The order was conferred in one class, limited to fifty knights.

The Kingdom of Prussia absorbed both Brandenburg-Bayreuth and Brandenburg-Ansbach in January 1792, and on 12 June 1792, King Frederick William II again revived the order as a Prussian royal order. After the Order of the Black Eagle, the Order of the Red Eagle was the second highest order of the kingdom in order of precedence. Every Knight of the Black Eagle now automatically became a member of the contemporary highest class of the Order of the Red Eagle.

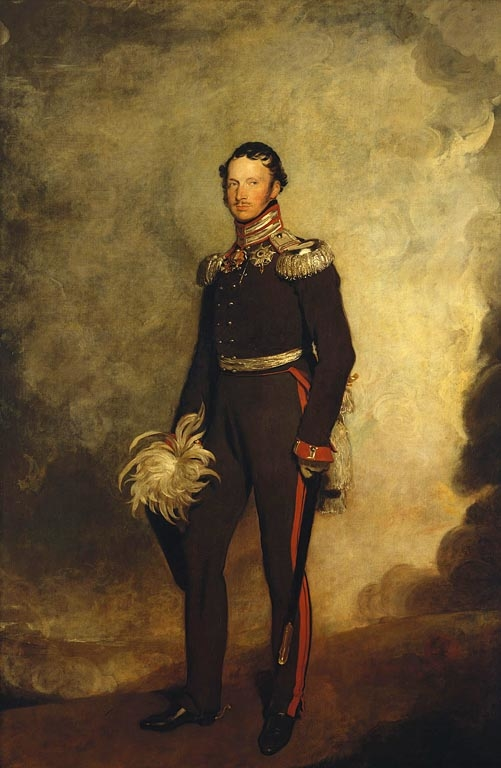
Portrait of Frederick William III of Prussia by Thomas Lawrence, 1818

In 1810, King Frederick William III revised the statutes of the order, expanding it into three classes. In 1830, a breast star was authorized for the Second Class and the First Class General Honor Decoration became the Fourth Class of the order. The statutes were further revised in 1861, and a Grand Cross was established as the highest class of the order. By change to the statutes of the Order of the Black Eagle, every member of that order was automatically invested with the new Grand Cross of the Order of the Red Eagle, as well as with the Order of the Prussian Crown. By 1918, an affiliated soldier's medal had been made available to commoners and enlisted men.

Following the Kaiser's abdication at the close of the First World War, a new German constitution was signed into law on 11 August 1919, effectively putting a legal end to the monarchy. All orders and decorations formally conferred by the monarchy ceased to exist, but recipients of the Order of the Red Eagle continued to wear it with their other decorations during the eras of the Weimar Republic, the Third Reich, and the restored republic.

== Classes ==
By the time of World War I, the order had evolved into four classes, two of them divided in two divisions each, and an affiliated medal:

- 1st Class
  - Grand Cross – enameled Maltese cross badge worn on a collar (the Kette, or "chain") at ceremonial occasions or, at other formal occasions, on a sash on the right shoulder; plus a gilt, eight-pointed breast star worn on the left chest; typically awarded to male members of the royal family, to members of the Order of the Black Eagle, to noblemen, and to foreign royalty
  - 1st Class – oversized, enameled cross pattée badge worn on a sash on the right shoulder, plus a silver, eight-pointed breast star on the left chest; available to general officers, high nobility, and heads of foreign state
- 2nd Class – enameled cross pattée badge worn on a neck ribbon, plus a silver, four-pointed breast star on the left chest; available to general officers and nobility
  - 2nd Class with star
  - 2nd Class
- 3rd Class – enameled cross pattée badge worn on a ribbon on the left chest; available to (usually no lower than) field grade officers and minor nobility
- 4th Class – non-enameled cross pattée badge worn on a ribbon on the left chest; available to company grade officers
- Medal – round gilt medal worn on a ribbon on the left chest; available to enlisted men

Within these seven grades, however, were a bewildering array of variations. Among these were:

- All classes but the Medal of the Red Eagle Order could be awarded with swords for distinction in wartime. The swords passed through the arms of the cross behind the center medallion.
- All classes above the 4th Class could be awarded with "Swords on Ring", indicating that the recipient of that class without swords had earlier received a lower class of the order with swords. A pair of crossed swords were worn above the cross on the suspension ring or above the medallion on the upper arm of the breast star.
- All classes could be awarded with or without crown as an added distinction.
- The Grand Cross, 1st and 2nd Class could be awarded with oak leaves, indicating prior receipt of the next lower class of the order, and/or with diamonds, as a special distinction.
- Royal family members (who were automatically awarded the Grand Cross of the Red Eagle Order, per statute of the Order of the Black Eagle) were awarded the Grand Cross "with crown." The Maltese cross badge was suspended from a miniature of the Prussian crown, which covered the usual suspension ring.
- The Grand Cross was awarded at least once with crossed marshals' batons, as was awarded to Paul von Hindenburg. The crossed batons were worn above the Maltese cross badge of the Grand Cross, on its suspension ring.
- The 3rd Class could be awarded with bow (Schleife), indicating prior receipt of the 4th Class.
- Knights of Saint John who received the Order of the Red Eagle and who had cared for sick and wounded soldiers in the Second Schleswig War and the Austro-Prussian War received the order with a miniature of the Maltese cross.
- For 50 years of service, a Red Eagle recipient received the "Jubilee Number" (Jubiläumszahl), a round medallion with the number "50" on it, affixed to the suspension ring or to the oak leaves or the ring of the bow, if applicable.

There were also a set of special versions, the Stars 1st through 4th Class, for non-Christians.

== Insignia ==
The badge of the order for the Grand Cross was a gold (gilt after 1916) Maltese cross enameled in white, with red enameled eagles between the arms of the cross; the gold central disc bore the Royal monogram, surrounded by a blue enameled ring bearing the motto of the Order, Sincere et Constanter.

The badge for the 1st to 3rd classes was a gold (gilt after 1916) cross pattée, enameled in white; that for the 4th class was similar but with smooth, plain silver arms. After 1879 the silver arms of the 4th class cross were pebbled in texture and appearance. The central disc bore the red eagle on a white enamel background on the obverse, with the royal cipher of King Friedrich Wilhelm surmounted by the Prussian crown on the reverse. The enlisted man's medal was of a relatively simple, round design, topped with the Prussian crown, with a depiction of the regular badge in the center of the medal on the obverse, with the royal cipher of the reigning monarch on the reverse.

The breast star of the order was (for the Grand Cross) a golden eight-pointed star, (for 1st Class) a silver eight-pointed star, or (for 2nd Class) a silver four-pointed star with a white enameled cross pattée, all with straight rays. The central disc bore the red eagle on a white enamel background, surrounded by a ring (enameled blue for Grand Cross, white for the others) bearing the motto of the Order, Sincere et Constanter.

After September 16, 1848, awards of all classes (except the medal) bestowed for military merit had two golden swords crossed through the central medallion.

The traditional ribbon of the order was white with two orange stripes at the edges, but combat awards were frequently conferred with a black and white ribbon similar to that of the Iron Cross. Numerous variations of the ribbon existed, depending on the nature of the specific award.

== Sovereigns (1705–1918) ==
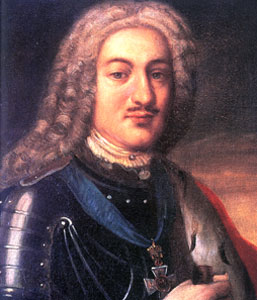
Georg Wilhelm, Markgraf of Brandenburg-Bayreuth, who founded the Ordre de la Sincerité

- Georg Wilhelm, Margrave of Brandenburg-Bayreuth (11/16/1678 – 12/18/1726), Sovereign of the Ordre de la Sincerité, from November 17, 1705; and from 1712 to 12/18/1726.
- Karl Wilhelm Friedrich, Margrave of Brandenburg-Ansbach (5/12/1712 – 8/3/1757), revived the Order as its Sovereign, 1734 – August 3, 1757, renamed the order as the Order of the Red Eagle (Roter Adlerorden)
- Karl Alexander, Margrave of Brandenburg-Ansbach and Brandenburg-Bayreuth (2/24/1736 – 1/5/1806), Sovereign from August 3, 1757, to January 16, 1791, when the two territories were annexed by Prussia
- Friedrich Wilhelm II, King of Prussia (9/25/1744 – 11/16/1797), revived the Order as its first Sovereign as a Prussian order, June 12, 1792 – 11/16/1797
- Friedrich Wilhelm III, King of Prussia (8/3/1770 – 6/7/1840), Sovereign from 11/16/1797 – 6/7/1840; revised the statutes in 1810 to add 2nd and 3rd classes; added 2nd class breast star and a 4th class, 1830
- Friedrich Wilhelm IV, King of Prussia (10/15/1795 – 1/2/1861), Sovereign from 6/7/1840 to 1/2/1861
- Wilhelm I, King of Prussia and German Emperor (3/22/1797 – 3/9/1888), Sovereign from 1/2/1861 to 3/9/1888; revised the statutes to add the Grand Cross, 1861
- Friedrich III, King of Prussia and German Emperor (10/18/1831 – 6/15/1888), Sovereign from January to June 1888
- Wilhelm II, King of Prussia & German Emperor (1859–1941), invested 1/27/1869; Sovereign from June 15, 1888, to November 28, 1918.

== Recipients ==
List of notable recipients

Grand Crosses

- Abbas II of Egypt
- Abdelaziz of Morocco
- Prince Adalbert of Prussia (1811–1873)
- Prince Adalbert of Prussia (1884–1948)
- Adolphus Frederick VI, Grand Duke of Mecklenburg-Strelitz
- Adolphus Frederick V, Grand Duke of Mecklenburg-Strelitz
- Albert I of Belgium
- Prince Albert of Prussia (1809–1872)
- Prince Albert of Saxe-Altenburg
- Prince Albert of Prussia (1837–1906)
- Albrecht, Duke of Württemberg
- Alexander Frederick, Landgrave of Hesse
- Prince Alexander of Hesse and by Rhine
- Prince Alexander of Prussia
- Alexis, Landgrave of Hesse-Philippsthal-Barchfeld
- Alfred, Duke of Saxe-Coburg and Gotha
- Alfred, Hereditary Prince of Saxe-Coburg and Gotha
- Alfred, 2nd Prince of Montenuovo
- Aoki Shūzō
- Prince Arisugawa Takehito
- Prince Arisugawa Taruhito
- Arthur Arz von Straußenburg
- Prince August Wilhelm of Prussia
- Augusta Victoria of Schleswig-Holstein
- Prince Axel of Denmark
- Barghash bin Said of Zanzibar
- Friedrich von Beck-Rzikowsky
- Felix von Bendemann
- Prince Oscar Bernadotte
- Prince Bernhard of Saxe-Weimar-Eisenach (1792–1862)
- Hans Hartwig von Beseler
- Friedrich Ferdinand von Beust
- Otto von Bismarck
- Moritz von Bissing
- Leonhard Graf von Blumenthal
- Adolf von Bonin
- Julius von Bose
- Paul Bronsart von Schellendorff
- Walther Bronsart von Schellendorff
- Leo von Caprivi
- Prince Carl, Duke of Västergötland
- Charles XIV John
- Charles XV
- Charles Edward, Duke of Saxe-Coburg and Gotha
- Charles Egon III, Prince of Fürstenberg
- Prince Charles of Prussia
- Chlodwig, Prince of Hohenlohe-Schillingsfürst
- Chlodwig, Landgrave of Hesse-Philippsthal-Barchfeld
- Christian IX of Denmark
- Karl Ludwig d'Elsa
- Porfirio Díaz
- Otto von Diederichs
- Edward VII
- Prince Edward of Saxe-Weimar
- Hermann von Eichhorn
- Prince Eitel Friedrich of Prussia
- Otto von Emmich
- Prince Erik, Duke of Västmanland
- Ernest I, Duke of Saxe-Coburg and Gotha
- Ernest II, Duke of Saxe-Coburg and Gotha
- Ernest Augustus, Duke of Brunswick
- Ernest Louis, Grand Duke of Hesse
- Botho zu Eulenburg
- Max von Fabeck
- Maximilian Vogel von Falckenstein
- Ferdinand II of Portugal
- Hermann von François
- Eduard von Fransecky
- Franz Joseph I of Austria
- Frederik VIII of Denmark
- Frederik IX of Denmark
- Prince Frederick Charles of Hesse
- Frederick Francis II, Grand Duke of Mecklenburg-Schwerin
- Frederick Francis III, Grand Duke of Mecklenburg-Schwerin
- Frederick III, German Emperor
- Frederick, Prince of Hohenzollern
- Walthère Frère-Orban
- Prince Friedrich Karl of Prussia (1828–1885)
- Prince Friedrich Leopold of Prussia
- Prince Fushimi Hiroyasu
- Prince Fushimi Sadanaru
- Max von Gallwitz
- George II of Greece
- George V
- Friedrich von Gerok (officer)
- Godefroi, prince de La Tour d'Auvergne-Lauraguais
- Colmar Freiherr von der Goltz
- Heinrich von Gossler
- Guangxu Emperor
- Gustaf V
- Gustaf VI Adolf
- Prince Gustav of Denmark
- Haakon VII of Norway
- Gottlieb Graf von Haeseler
- Wilhelm von Hahnke
- Prince Harald of Denmark
- Max von Hausen
- Hans Heinrich XV, Prince of Pless
- Heinrich XXVII, Prince Reuss Younger Line
- Prince Heinrich of Hesse and by Rhine
- Prince Henry of Prussia (1862–1929)
- Prince Hermann of Saxe-Weimar-Eisenach (1825–1901)
- Karl Eberhard Herwarth von Bittenfeld
- J. B. van Heutsz
- Higashifushimi Yorihito
- Prince Konrad of Hohenlohe-Schillingsfürst
- Henning von Holtzendorff
- Dietrich von Hülsen-Haeseler
- Isma'il Pasha
- Prince Joachim of Prussia
- Prince Johann of Schleswig-Holstein-Sonderburg-Glücksburg
- Duke John Albert of Mecklenburg
- Prince Julius of Schleswig-Holstein-Sonderburg-Glücksburg
- Hans von Kaltenborn-Stachau
- Georg von Kameke
- Prince Kan'in Kotohito
- Prince Karl Anton of Hohenzollern
- Karl Anton, Prince of Hohenzollern
- Katsura Tarō
- Gustav von Kessel
- Mahboob Ali Khan
- Hans von Kirchbach
- Hugo von Kirchbach
- Prince Kitashirakawa Yoshihisa
- Eduard von Knorr
- Robert Koch
- Hans von Koester
- Prince Komatsu Akihito
- Leopold I of Belgium
- Leopold II of Belgium
- Prince Leopold, Duke of Albany
- Prince Leopold of Bavaria
- Rudolf von Leuthold
- Alexander von Linsingen
- Ewald von Lochow
- Walter von Loë
- Louis IV, Grand Duke of Hesse
- Louis XVIII
- Louis Ferdinand, Prince of Prussia
- Prince Louis of Battenberg
- Ludwig Wilhelm, Prince of Bentheim and Steinfurt
- Joseph Maximilian von Maillinger
- Albrecht Gustav von Manstein
- Edwin Freiherr von Manteuffel
- Manuel II of Portugal
- Joseph Freiherr von Maroicic
- Georg von der Marwitz
- Klemens von Metternich
- Grand Duke Michael Nikolaevich of Russia
- Helmuth von Moltke the Elder
- Helmuth von Moltke the Younger
- Rudolf Montecuccoli
- Prince Moritz of Saxe-Altenburg
- Georg Alexander von Müller
- Napoleon III
- Oscar II
- Prince Oskar of Prussia
- Alexander August Wilhelm von Pape
- Duke Paul Frederick of Mecklenburg
- Philipp, Prince of Eulenburg
- Prince Philippe, Count of Flanders
- Hans von Plessen
- Karl von Plettenberg
- Arthur von Posadowsky-Wehner
- Prince Friedrich Wilhelm of Prussia
- Naser al-Din Shah Qajar
- Georg Ræder
- Albrecht von Roon
- Prince Rudolf of Liechtenstein
- Reinhard Scheer
- Sigismund von Schlichting
- Alfred von Schlieffen
- Emil von Schlitz
- Kurd von Schlözer
- Gustav von Senden-Bibran
- Prince Sigismund of Prussia (1896–1978)
- Charles Spencer, 6th Earl Spencer
- Niklaus Friedrich von Steiger
- Karl Friedrich von Steinmetz
- Otto Graf zu Stolberg-Wernigerode
- Vladimir Sukhomlinov
- Ludwig Freiherr von und zu der Tann-Rathsamhausen
- Karl Tersztyánszky von Nádas
- Alfred von Tirpitz
- Prince Valdemar of Denmark
- Victor I, Duke of Ratibor
- Victor II, Duke of Ratibor
- Konstantin Bernhard von Voigts-Rhetz
- Prince Waldemar of Prussia (1889–1945)
- Alfred von Waldersee
- Arthur Wellesley, 1st Duke of Wellington
- August von Werder
- Wilhelm Karl, Duke of Urach
- Wilhelm, German Crown Prince
- Prince Wilhelm, Duke of Södermanland
- William I, German Emperor
- Duke William of Württemberg
- William, Prince of Hohenzollern
- William, Prince of Wied
- Friedrich Graf von Wrangel
- Duke Eugen of Württemberg (1846–1877)
- Yamagata Aritomo
- Yamamoto Gonnohyōe
- Heinrich von Zastrow
- Nikola Zhekov

1st Class

- Prince Adalbert of Bavaria (1828–1875)
- Albert, Prince Consort
- Alexander of Battenberg
- Alfred I, Prince of Windisch-Grätz
- August Gyldenstolpe
- Gustav Bachmann
- Alexander Barclay de Tolly-Weymarn
- Friedrich von Bernhardi
- Hans Alexis von Biehler
- Herbert von Bismarck
- Day Bosanquet
- Felix Graf von Bothmer
- Adalbert von Bredow
- Friedrich Wilhelm Freiherr von Bülow
- Heinrich von Bülow (diplomat)
- Eduard von Capelle
- Ernest Cassel
- Prince Christian Victor of Schleswig-Holstein
- Leopold Wilhelm von Dobschütz
- Ludvig Douglas
- Eduard, Duke of Anhalt
- Carl August Ehrensvärd (1858–1944)
- Ernst II, Duke of Saxe-Altenburg
- Archduke Franz Karl of Austria
- Archduke Friedrich, Duke of Teschen
- August Neidhardt von Gneisenau
- Hans von Gronau
- Gustav, Prince of Vasa
- Jakob von Hartmann
- Samu Hazai
- Frederick VI, Landgrave of Hesse-Homburg
- Friedrich von Ingenohl
- Archduke John of Austria
- Kalākaua
- Prince Karl Theodor of Bavaria
- Algernon Keith-Falconer, 9th Earl of Kintore
- Kodama Gentarō
- Konstantin of Hohenlohe-Schillingsfürst
- Leopold IV, Duke of Anhalt
- Charles Liedts
- Archduke Ludwig Viktor of Austria
- Duke Charles of Mecklenburg
- Christoph Johann von Medem
- Emmanuel von Mensdorff-Pouilly
- Ivan Nabokov
- August Ludwig von Nostitz
- Jean-Baptiste Nothomb
- Alexey Fyodorovich Orlov
- Prince Paul of Württemberg
- Ernst von Pfuel
- Georg Dubislav Ludwig von Pirch
- Ernst von Plener
- Hugo von Pohl
- Carlo Andrea Pozzo di Borgo
- Joseph Radetzky von Radetz
- Antoni Wilhelm Radziwiłł
- Wilhelm Eugen Ludwig Ferdinand von Rohr
- Willem Rooseboom
- Saionji Kinmochi
- Saitō Makoto
- Friedrich von Scholtz
- Ludwig von Schröder
- Archduke Stephen of Austria (Palatine of Hungary)
- Rudolf Stöger-Steiner von Steinstätten
- Hermann von Strantz
- Vladimir Sukhomlinov
- Julius von Verdy du Vernois
- Wilhelm René de l'Homme de Courbière
- William II, Elector of Hesse
- Prince William of Baden (1829–1897)
- Prince William of Hesse-Philippsthal-Barchfeld
- Ludwig von Wolzogen
- Duke Eugen of Württemberg (1788–1857)
- Arthur Zimmermann

2nd Class

- Akiyama Yoshifuru
- Ilya I. Alekseyev
- Duke Alexander of Württemberg (1771–1833)
- William Balck
- Martin Chales de Beaulieu
- Paul Behncke
- Konstantin von Benckendorff
- Wilhelm von Bismarck
- Friedrich Boedicker
- Paul von Bruns
- Hans von Bülow
- Christian Conrad Sophus Danneskiold-Samsøe (1836–1908)
- Evgraf Davydov
- Hermann Deiters
- Emil du Bois-Reymond
- Karl von Einem
- Ludwig Elster
- Oskar Enqvist
- Friedrich Albrecht zu Eulenburg
- Ivan Fullon
- Georg Freiherr von Gayl
- Sidney Greville
- Wilhelm Groener
- Erich von Gündell
- Ernst August Hagen
- Friedrich von Hassel
- Franz von Hipper
- Eberhard von Hofacker
- Oskar von Hutier
- Paisi Kaysarov
- August von Kleist
- Konstantin Poltoratsky
- Hermann von Kuhl
- Julius Kühn
- Alfred von Kühne
- Karl Ledderhose
- Alexander Mikhailovich Lermontov
- Otto von Lossow
- Friedrich Graf von der Schulenburg
- Edward Montagu-Stuart-Wortley
- Curt von Morgen
- Otto von Moser
- Dmitry Neverovsky
- Georg Heinrich Ludwig Nicolovius
- Ferdinand von Quast
- Wilhelm von Ramming
- Hubert von Rebeur-Paschwitz
- Nikolai Reitsenshtein
- Ludwig von Reuter
- Eduard Schensnovich
- Heinrich Scheuch
- Ehrhard Schmidt
- Leopold von Schrötter
- Carl Georg Schwing
- Arkady Skugarevsky
- Wilhelm Souchon
- Adolf von Trotha
- Nikita Volkonsky
- Oskar von Watter

3rd Class

- Theobald von Bethmann Hollweg
- Nikolai Dimitrievich Dabić
- Gunther von Etzel
- Victor Franke
- Ivan Fullon
- Hasan bey Agalarov
- Ernst von Hoeppner
- Adolf Wild von Hohenborn
- Ferdinand Jühlke
- Karl Wilhelm Heinrich von Kleist
- Friedrich Wilhelm Kritzinger (theologian)
- Wilhelm Lamey
- Leberecht Maass
- Hugo Meurer
- Jan Willem Louis van Oordt
- Ferdinand von Parseval
- Johann Heinrich Richartz
- Manfred von Richthofen
- Alfred Saalwächter
- Eberhard Graf von Schmettow
- Constantin von Tischendorf
- Eduard Vogel von Falckenstein
- Ferdinand Franz Wallraf

Other or Unknown Classes

- Konrad Adenauer
- Yevgeni Ivanovich Alekseyev
- Ali bin Hamud of Zanzibar
- Marcos Antônio de Araújo, Viscount of Itajubá
- Augusta Victoria of Schleswig-Holstein
- Theodor Avellan
- Karl Gustav von Baggovut
- Pyotr Bagration
- Michael Andreas Barclay de Tolly
- Jacob Friedrich Behrend
- Ernst von Bibra
- Friedrich Wilhelm von Bismarck
- Gebhard Leberecht von Blücher
- Karl August Ferdinand von Borcke
- Gustav Jacob Born
- Władysław Grzegorz Branicki
- Adolf von Brudermann
- Rudolf von Brudermann
- Meno Burg
- Paul von Buri
- Ottavio Cagiano de Azevedo
- Yefim Chaplits
- Charles Frederick, Grand Duke of Baden
- Charles Louis, Hereditary Prince of Baden
- Christian of the Palatinate-Zweibrücken (1752–1817)
- Gustav Cohn
- John Edmund Commerell
- Carl Emanuel Conrad
- Dmitry Bagration-Imeretinsky
- Fleetwood Edwards
- Karl Friedrich Eichhorn
- Howard Craufurd Elphinstone
- Friedrich August Elsasser
- Grigori Engelhardt
- William Fane De Salis (admiral)
- Walther Forstmann
- Frederick William III, Duke of Schleswig-Holstein-Sonderburg-Beck
- Frederick Charles Louis, Duke of Schleswig-Holstein-Sonderburg-Beck
- Annibale de Gasparis
- Friedrich von Georgi
- Jean-Léon Gérôme
- Dmitry Golitsyn
- James Grierson
- Wilhelm Heinrich von Grolman
- Ian Hamilton (British Army officer)
- Carl Jacob Hammarsköld
- Eduard Heis
- William Hespeler
- Philip, Landgrave of Hesse-Homburg
- Paul von Hindenburg
- Dietrich Hogemann
- Heinrich Jacobi (archaeologist)
- John Jellicoe, 1st Earl Jellicoe
- Rudolf Jordan (painter)
- Archduke Joseph August of Austria
- Karl, Prince of Hohenzollern-Sigmaringen
- Thomas Kelly-Kenny
- Colin Richard Keppel
- Pyotr Kikin
- Franz Körte
- Semyon Kozak
- Prince Kraft zu Hohenlohe-Ingelfingen
- Ignacy Krasicki
- Charles Vane, 3rd Marquess of Londonderry
- Louis I, Grand Duke of Baden
- Gari Melchers
- Aleksey Melissino
- Edward Montagu-Stuart-Wortley
- Krzysztof Celestyn Mrongovius
- George Murray (British Army officer)
- Charles Napier (Royal Navy officer)
- Vladimir Nemirovich-Danchenko
- Daniel Nordlander
- Fabian Gottlieb von der Osten-Sacken
- Charles Sprague Pearce
- Karl von Plettenberg
- Kazimierz Porębski
- George Edward Post
- Dighton Probyn
- Antoni Radziwiłł
- Pablo Riccheri
- Julius Roeting
- Carl Ludwig Sahl
- John Francis Charles, 7th Count de Salis-Soglio
- Peter, 5th Count de Salis-Soglio
- Max Sandreczky
- Aleksei Scherbatov
- Ernst Christian Julius Schering
- Albert Schulz
- Manuel Silvela y Le Vielleuze
- Mikhail Skobelev
- Pavlo Skoropadskyi
- Thomas Smith-Dorrien-Smith
- Charles Spencer, 6th Earl Spencer
- Konstantin Stanislavski
- Wolfgang Straßmann
- Ludwig August von Stutterheim
- Wilhelm Ternite
- Otto Tschirch
- Diedrich Uhlhorn
- Antonio Aguilar y Correa, Marquis of Vega de Armijo
- Godfried van Voorst tot Voorst
- Baldwin Wake Walker
- Ricardo Wall
- Friedrich Wilhelm Weber
- Friedrich Wigger
- Wilhelm II, German Emperor
- Sir James Wylie, 1st Baronet
- Oskar von Xylander
- Aleksey Petrovich Yermolov
- Mass'oud Mirza Zell-e Soltan

What follows are some additional details on a fair cross section of individuals who are known to have received the Order in any of its several classes, listed in order of precedence. The Order of the Red Eagle frequently was conferred upon foreign nationals, both royal and non-royal, to honor their individual positions or work and to further diplomatic relations with their nations, in much the same way that the Order of the Bath still is conferred by the British monarchy.

=== Grand Cross (1861–1918) ===
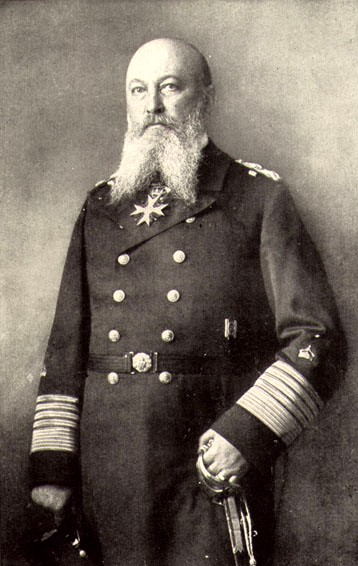
Großadmiral Alfred von Tirpitz, wearing his Order of the Red Eagle, Grand Cross

German / Prussian

- Empress Augusta (1811–1890), wife and empress consort of Kaiser Wilhelm I
- GFM Albrecht Theodore Emil, Graf von Roon (1803–1879) – previous 3rd Class Knight, automatically awarded the Grand Cross in conjunction with being awarded with the Order of the Black Eagle, ca 1866, for service during the war with Austria, immediately after his success at the battle of Nikolsburg.
- Otto Theodor Freiherr von Manteuffel (1805–1882), Prussian Minister of the Interior (Prime Minister), 1848; awarded the Grand Cross, with Scepter and Crown, by Friedrich Wilhelm IV
- Prince Heinrich of Prussia, second son of Friedrich III and brother of Wilhelm II
- Empress Augusta Viktoria (1858–1921), wife and empress consort of Kaiser Wilhelm II
- Otto von Bismarck (1815–1898), German statesman, Prussian chancellor and prime minister of the German Empire
- Max von Fabeck (1854–1916), with oakleaves, Prussian General
- Gen-Lt. Ferdinand Graf von Zeppelin (1838–1917), aviator, inventor of the airship, and founder of Zeppelin Airship Company
- GFM (later Reichspräsident) Paul von Hindenburg (1847–1934), invested with the Grand Cross, with Oak Leaves and Swords
- Gustav von Senden-Bibran (1847–1909) with oak leaves and swords, was an admiral of the German Imperial Navy
- GFM Helmuth von Moltke (the Elder), (1800–1891), Chief of the German General Staff
- Crown Prince Wilhelm of Prussia, Crown Prince of the German Empire (1882–1951), invested c. his 10th birthday, 1892
- Prince Eitel Friedrich of Prussia (1883–1942), second son of Kaiser Wilhelm II
- Prince Adalbert of Prussia (1884–1948), third son of Kaiser Wilhelm II
- Prince August Wilhelm of Prussia (1887–1949), fourth son of Kaiser Wilhelm II
- Prince Oskar of Prussia (1888–1958), fifth son of Kaiser Wilhelm II
- Bernhard Freiherr von Bülow (1849–1929), Minister of Foreign Affairs, conferred, January 6, 1898, for his successes in advancing relations with China.
- Prince Joachim of Prussia (1890–1920), sixth son of Kaiser Wilhelm II
- Dr. Karl Heinrich Schönstedt, Prussian Minister of Justice, invested with the Grand Cross of the Order on the occasion of Kaiser Wilhelm II's birthday, January 27, 1900
- Ernst Frhr von Hammerstein-Loxten (1827–1914), Prussian Minister of Agriculture, conferred on the occasion of Kaiser Wilhelm II's birthday, January 27, 1900
- Arthur Count von Posadowsky-Wehner (1845–1932), Prussian Minister of the Interior and Vice Chancellor, conferred on the occasion of Kairser Wilhelm II's birthday, January 27, 1902
- Prince Friedrich Sigismund of Prussia (1891–1927), nephew of Kaiser Wilhelm II, pilot during the Great War, invested with the Grand Cross with Crown
- Paul von Breitenbach (1850–1930), German Statesman; invested with the Grand Cross of the Order, 1913, by statute of the Order of the Black Eagle
- Großadmiral Alfred von Tirpitz (1849–1930); conferred with the Order of the Red Eagle, Grand Cross, with Crown; also conferred with the Order of the Black Eagle
- Korvettenkapitän Gerhard Stubenrauch (b. 1880) – previously awarded the Knight's Cross, 4th Class, Stubenrauch was the commander of all naval aviation in the Kaiserlich Marine

Foreign

- George IV, King of Great Britain (1762–1830), invested 6/9/1814
- William IV, King of Great Britain (1765–1837), invested 6/9/1814
- Charles Maurice de Talleyrand-Périgord, Prince Talleyrand (France)
- Prince Klemens Wenzel von Metternich, Prince Metternich-Winnebourg-Ochsenhausen (German: Klemens Wenzel Nepomuk Lothar Fürst von Metternich-Winneburg zu Beilstein), Austrian Foreign Minister, 1809–1848
- Prince Andreas Rasoumoffsky (1752–1836), PC (Russia)
- Gustavus, Count de Stackelberg, PC (Russia)
- Karl, Count of Nesselrode (1780–1862), Privy Councilor (Russia)
- Prince Alfred, Duke of Edinburgh & Saxe-Coburg_Gotha (1844–1900, GB), invested 5/7/1864
- Alexander III, Tsar of Russia (1845–1894)
- Gen Sir Dighton Probyn (1833–1924), VC, GCB – invested at GC / 1st Class (India / GB)
- Gen. Sir Thomas Kelly-Kenny (1840–1914), (GB)
- Edward VII, King of Great Britain (1841–1910), invested 1/17/1869
- Prince Arthur, Duke of Connaught and Strathearn (1850–1942, GB), invested 1873
- Prince Leopold, Duke of Albany (1853–1884, GB), invested 3/31/1879
- Prince Arthur of Connaught (1883–1938, GB), invested 1/13/1883
- Milan I, King of Serbia (1868–1889), invested 1886
- Prince Kitashirakawa Yoshihisa (1847–1895), Japanese imperial family and soldier, invested December 1889
- Marquis Itō Hirobumi (1841–1909), Prime Minister of Japan, received the GC 12/22/1886, later received the GC in brilliants 12/14/1901
- Marquis Yamagata Aritomo (1838–1922), Prime Minister of Japan, invested June 1899
- Viscount Aoki Shūzō (1844–1914), Japanese minister to Berlin, received the GC 1/26/1895, later received the GC in brilliants 6/18/1897
- The Guangxu Emperor (1871–1908), 11th Qing Emperor of China, invested 1898
- First Class Marquis Suyi Li Hongzhang (1823–1901), Chinese politician and diplomat, invested 6/14/1896
- Yuan Shikai (1859–1916), Chinese politician and general
- Nikolay Karlovich Giers (1820–1895), Russian Foreign Minister and architect of the Franco-Russian Alliance; Grand Cross (by statute of the Order of the Black Eagle), July 23, 1888
- Prince Alfred of Edinburgh (1874–1899, GB), invested June 1889
- George V, King of Great Britain (1865–1936), invested 7/3/1890
- Alexander, Duke of Fife (1849–1912, GB), invested 1892
- Gen.-Lt. Constantin von Alvensleben (1809–1892), invested with the Grand Cross, 1892, by statute of the Order of the Black Eagle
- FM Archduke Friedrich of Austria-Hungary (1856–1936), GC / 1st Class (also held the Ord of the Black Eagle from October 22, 1892) – invested c. 1895
- Porfirio Díaz, President of Mexico (1876–1880, 1884–1911)
- St John Brodrick, British Secretary of State for War (1856–1942), invested in September 1902 when he visited Prussia for German Army maneuvers.
- Adolphus Cambridge, 1st Marquess of Cambridge (formerly Prince Adolphus Duke of Teck) (1868–1927, GB), invested 1903
- Julio Argentino Roca (1843-1914) President of Argentina, invested in 1906
- Count Katsura Tarō (1848–1913), Japanese politician and soldier, October 4, 1906
- Haakon VII, King of Norway (1872–1957), invested 5/27/1907
- Mahbub Ali Khan, Asaf Jah VI - Nizam (sovereign prince) of Hyderabad, a principality in India; honorary (British and Indian) lieutenant general, invested 1911
- Albert I, King of the Belgians (1875–1934)
- LTG Rt. Hon Charles William Stewart, Lord Stewart (GB) British soldier, politician and nobleman, great-grandfather of Winston Churchill
- MG Carl Löwenhielm, Count of Löwenhielm (Sweden / Norway)
- Franz Josef I, Emperor of Austria-Hungary (1830–1916)
- Ludwig IV, Grand Duke of Hesse & by Rhine (1837–1892), son-in-law of Queen Victoria; brother-in-law of Friedrich III; uncle of Wilhelm II
- Gen der INF Otto von Bülow – Nov 15, 1917, by statute regarding conferral of the Order of the Black Eagle
- Ernst Ludwig, Grand Duke of Hesse and by Rhine (1868–1937), grandson of Queen Victoria, husband of Princess Victoria Melita of Edinburgh, cousin of Kaiser Wilhelm II, invested with the Grand Cross or the 1st Class (?)
- General der Infanterie Friedrich Sixt von Armin (1851–1936), awarded the Grand Cross by statute of the Order of the Black Eagle, conferred, 1917
- Prince Leopold of Bavaria (1846–1930); Awarded the Grand Cross with Swords; also a member of the Order of the Black Eagle
- Prince Franz of Bavaria (1875–1957); awarded the Grand Cross by statute of the Order of Black Eagle
- Naser al-Din Shah (1831–1896), Shah of Persia (1848–1896)
- Mozaffar al-Din Shah (1853–1907), Shah of Persia (1896–1907)
- Pavlo Skoropadskyi, hetman of the Ukrainian State. Granted in 1918
- Marcos Antônio de Araújo, Viscount of Itajubá. Ambassador of Emperor Dom Pedro II of Brazil to the King of Hanover and King of Prussia.

=== Knights 1st Class (1705–1918) ===
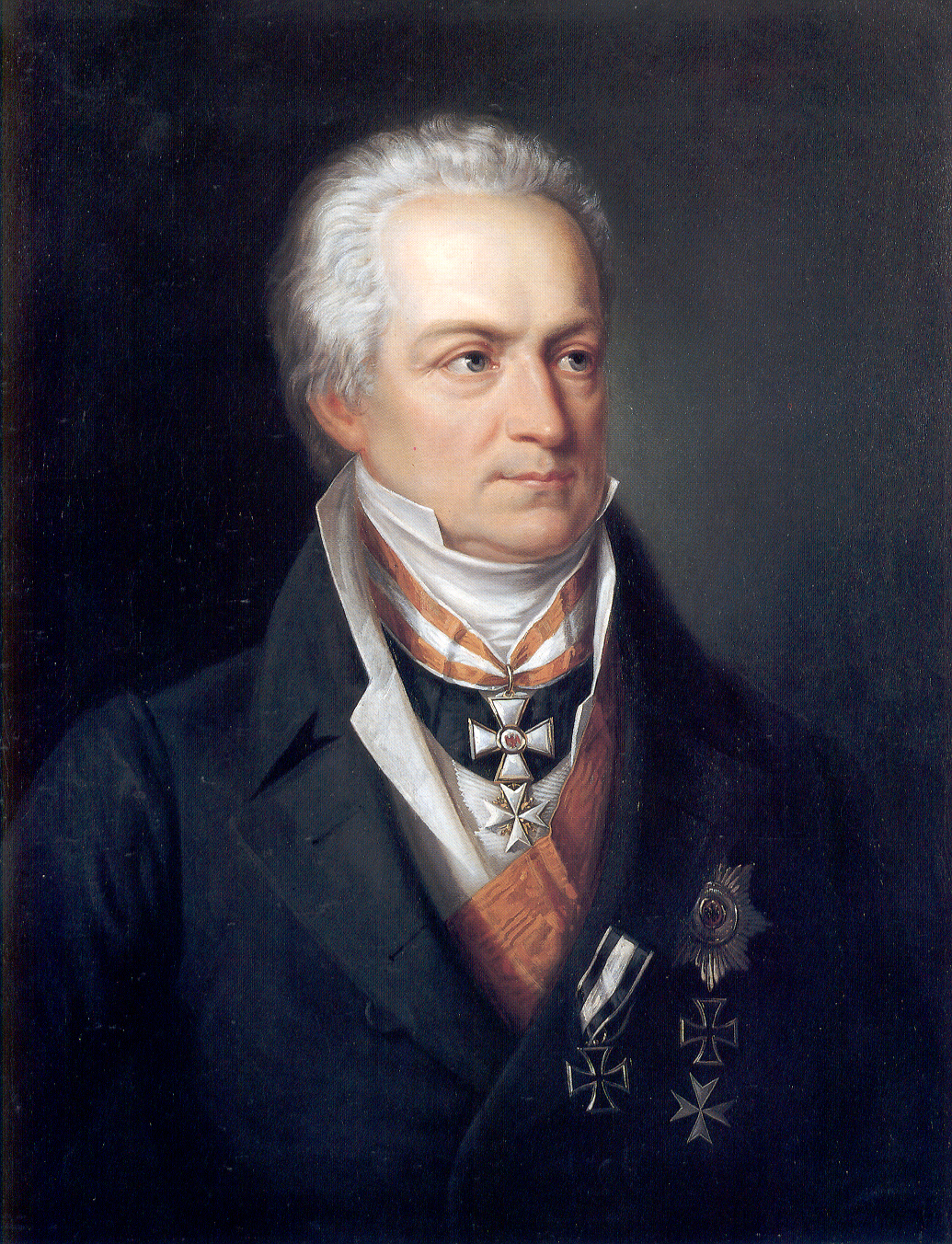
Karl August Fürst (Prince) von Hardenberg, ca 1822, by Friedrich Georg Weitsch. Hardenberg wears the badge of the Order of the Red Eagle, 1st Class, above his other orders

German

- Wilhelm Frhr von Humboldt (1767–1835) (Prussia), German language scholar and statesman
- Karl August, Prince of Hardenburg (1750–1822), Chancellor of State (Prussia), 1804–1806; 1807; and 1810–1822
- Ernst von Pfuel - Prussian general and Prime Minister of Prussia, awarded the 1st Class with Oak Leaves (1836) and Diamonds (1842). Previously awarded the 2nd Class with Oak Leaves (1830) and Star (1831); 3rd Class (1827)
- Ludwig von Massow, awarded the 1st Class with Oak Leaves
- Louis III, Grand Duke of Hesse (1806–1877), awarded the 1st Class with Swords
- Grand Admiral Alfred von Tirpitz, awarded the Order, 1st Class, with Oak Leaves, on the occasion of Kaiser Wilhelm II's birthday, January 27, 1900 (Source: The New York Times)
- Dr. Studt, Minister of Public Instruction, awarded the Order, 1st Class, on the occasion of Kaiser Wilhelm II's birthday, January 27, 1900
- Bolko Count von Hochberg, awarded the Order, 1st Class, on the occasion of Kaiser Wilhelm II's birthday, January 27, 1900
- Generalleutnant á la suite Viktor Adolph Theophil von Podbielski (1844–1916), hussar general, Prussian Minister of Agriculture, Postmaster General, and President of the German Olympic Committee; awarded 1st Class with oak leaves and crossed swords, on the occasion of Kaiser Wilhelm II's birthday January 27, 1902
- Theodor von Holleben, German Ambassador to the United States; awarded 1st Class with oak leaves after the visit of Prince Henry of Prussia to the US, March 1902.
- Baron Hermann Speck von Sternburg, Prussian Consul to Calcutta, German Ambassador to the United States, awarded the 1st Class, Jan 5, 1903
- Anton von Werner (1871–1914), awarded the Order, 1st Class, 1912; previously awarded the 2nd Class
- GenObst Felix Graf von Bothmer of Bavaria (1852–1937), conferred with the Order, 1st Class, January 17, 1914
- Gen-Lt Philipp von Hellingrath of Bavaria (1862–1939), awarded the 1st Class with Swords, Nov 14, 1918; previously awarded the 2nd Class (7 Jun 1914)
- Henry William, Baron de Bülow awarded the Order 1st Class, Envoy Extraordinary & Minister Plenipotentiary to Her Majesty Queen Victoria
- Eduard von Jachmann, Prussian Vice Admiral, awarded 1st Class with Swords

Foreign

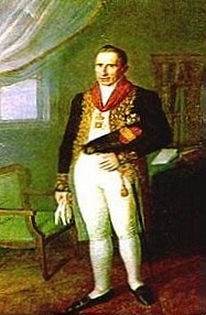
Giustino Fortunato, Prime minister of the Kingdom of the Two Sicilies

- Prince Talleyrand of France, Envoy of Emperor Napoleon I (Napoleon Bonaparte) of the French, to Russia, 1807; conferred with both the Order of the Black Eagle and the Red Eagle, before 1807
- Prince Alexander Borisovich Kourakin of Russia, Envoy of Tsar Alexander I of Russia, to France, 1807; conferred with both the Black Eagle Order and Red Eagle Order, before 1807
- Prince Leopold of Belgium (future Leopold II), Duke of Brabant, awarded the Order, 1st Class
- Count Maximilian van Lerchenfeld-Koefering, Chamberlain to the King of Bavaria, and envoy to the United States; conferred before 1845
- Giustino Fortunato (1777–1862), prime minister of the Kingdom of the Two Sicilies, conferred with the Red Eagle Order in 1850
- Lieutenant General Pierre-Dominique Bazaine (1786–1838) French mathematician and engineer
- Mehmed Emin Âli Pasha, Turkish Minister of Foreign Affairs, awarded the Order, 1st Class (for non-Christians), 1851
- Vicomte Vincent-Victor Henri de Vaublanc, Chamberlain to the King of Bavaria, October 21, 1856
- Kemal Effendi, Turkish Ambassador to Berlin, awarded the Order, 1st Class (for non-Christians), July 2, 1857
- Prince Mass'oud Mirza Zell-e Soltan (1850–1918), son of Naser al-Din Shah, King of Persia.
- President Paul Kruger (1825–1904), President of the Transvaal (first award in 1884, elevated to First Class in 1896)
- Friedrich von Beck-Rzikowsky (1830–1920), Austrian field marshal, chief of the general staff of the Imperial and Royal Army of Austria-Hungary, awarded in 1888; elevated to First Class in Diamonds, 6 September 1891
- Marquis Saionji Kinmochi (1849–1940), Japanese minister to Berlin, October 15, 1891
- Edward Villiers, 5th Earl of Clarendon (1846–1914), Lord-in-Waiting, in connection with the visit of Emperor Wilhelm II to the United Kingdom in late 1899.
- Lieutenant-General Sir Frederick Marshall, Colonel of the 1st Royal Dragoons, in connection with the visit of Emperor Wilhelm II to the United Kingdom in late 1899.
- Lieutenant-General Sir Thomas Kelly-Kenny (1840–1914), Adjutant-general of the British Forces, invested in September 1902 when he visited Prussia for German Army maneuvers.
- Lieutenant-General Sir John French (1852–1925), invested in September 1902 when he visited Prussia for German Army maneuvers.
- Baron Saitō Makoto (1858–1936), Japanese Navy Minister, February 26, 1907
- Liang Cheng (1864–1917), Chinese minister to Berlin, March 6, 1913

=== Knights 2nd Class (1810–1918) ===
Order of the Red Eagle, 2nd Class, badge & neck ribbon

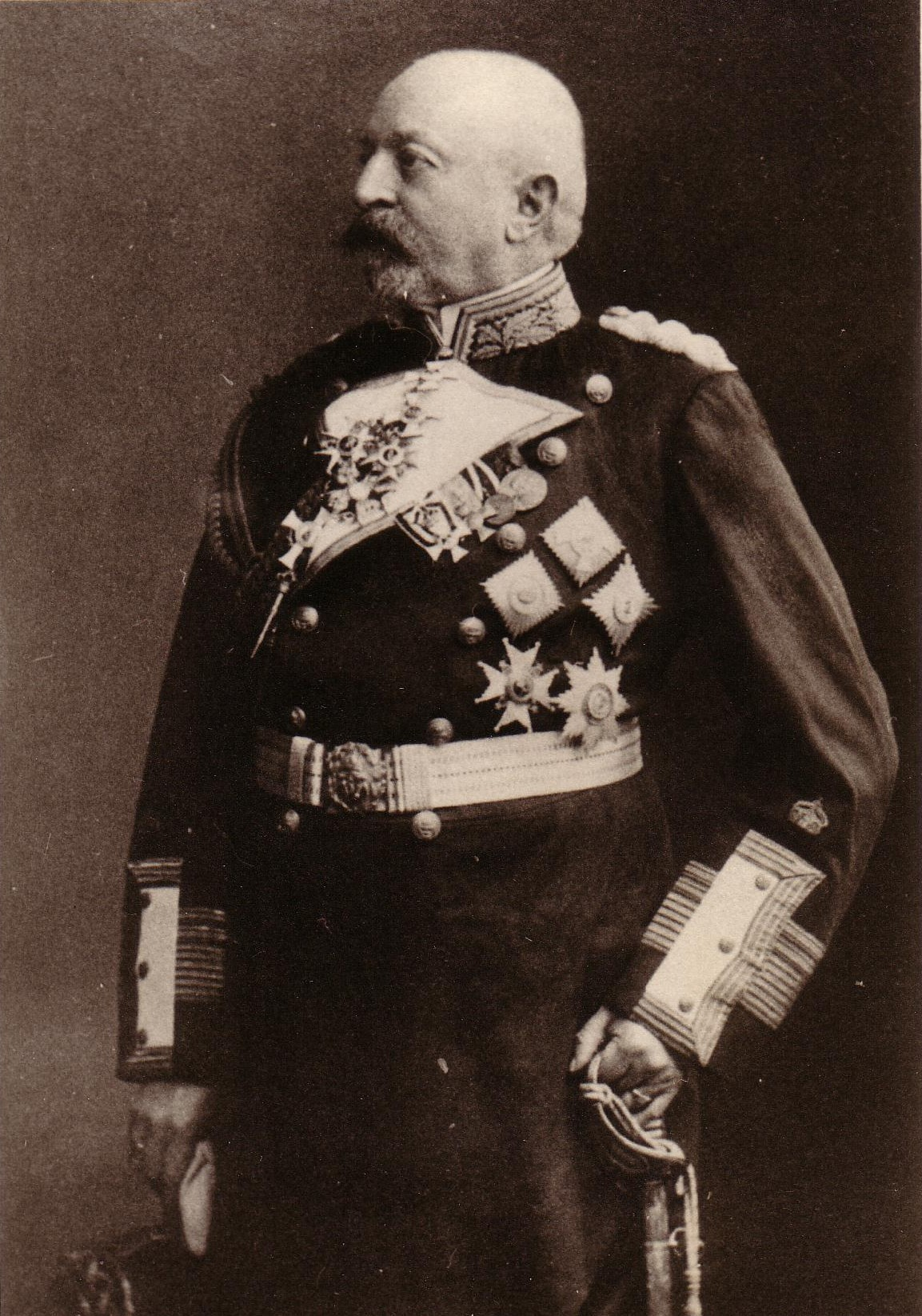
ADM Curt von Prittwitz, wearing the badge & star of the 2nd Class

German

- Mayer Carl Frhr von Rothschild (1820–1886), King's Court-Banker for Frankfurt, awarded the 2nd Class (for non-Christians), August 14, 1857
- Dr. Albert Sigismund Jaspis (1809–1885), Generalsuperintendant of Pommern in Stettin, awarded the 2nd Class, with Bow, by Kaiser Wilhelm I, 1/18/1863
- Anton von Werner (1871–1914), court painter to the Prussian royal family; awarded the Order 2nd Class, Jan 20, 1895, and awarded the breast star of the 2nd Class, Mar 30, 1902
- Johann Heinrich Frhr von Bernstorff (1862–1939), Ambassador to the United States, conferred with the Order, 2nd Class, on December 24, 1909
- Gen der INF Otto von Below (1857–1944), awarded the Order, 2nd Class, with oak leaves and with breast star, bef. 1914
- Gen. der INF Karl Rttr von Fasbender of Bavaria (1852–1933), conferred with the Order, 2nd Class, with Crown, and with breast star
- Gen der INF Paul Rttr von Kuenßl of Bavaria (1862–1928), awarded the 2nd Class with swords, 12 JUN 1915; previously awarded the 4th Class, pre-World War I
- Gen-Lt Nikolaus Rttr von Endres of Bavaria (1862–1938), awarded the 2nd Class with swords24 AUG 1917; previously awarded the 3rd Class with swords, pre-World War I
- Gen-Lt (later Gen der KAV) Alfred von Kühne (1853–1945); awarded the 2nd Class in 1912 when he first retired from the army.
- Gen der Kav Ludwig Freiherr von Gebsattel of Bavaria (1857–1930), awarded the 2nd Class with breast star; previously awarded the 3rd Class with Crown
- Gen-Lt (later Gen der KAV) Otto von Stetten of Bavaria (1862–1937); awarded the 2nd Class, prior to World War I
- Gen-Lt ( and later Gen der ARTy) Hermann frhr von Stein (1859–1928); awarded the 2nd Class with swords & the 2nd Class breast star with swords, 20 JAN 1917; previously awarded the 3rd Class, prior to World War I
- Gen-Maj ( later Gen-Lt) Ludwig Rttr von Tutschek of Bavaria (1864–1937); awarded the 2nd Class with Swords, 3 Feb 1917; previously awarded the 4th Class, prior to World War I
- Gen-Lt (later Gen der INF) Hermann von Kuhl (1858–1956); awarded the 2nd Class with Oak Leaves and swords, and the 2nd Class breast star, 15 JAN 1916 & 12 JAN 1918
- Gen-Lt Wilhelm Gröner of Württemberg (1867–1939), awarded the 2nd Class with Crown & Swords, and with breast star, 15 Jun 1918; previously awarded the 2nd Class w/o breast star (16 AUG 1917), 3rd Class (19 JUL 1913), 4th Class with Crown (17 Sep 1909); & 4th Class (11 SEP 1907)
- Gen-Lt Constantin Wilhelm Albert Müller, awarded the breast star of the Order, 2nd Class, with Oak leaves and Swords, by Kaiser Wilhelm II, 10/23/1918; Previously awarded the 3rd Class with Crown and Swords
- Vice ADM Franz von Hipper (?), German hero of the Battle of the Jutland; awarded the Order, 2nd Class; previously awarded the 3rd Class with Bow and 4th Class with Crown
- Vizeadmiral (Vice Admiral) and Admiral à la suite (honorary [full] Admiral) Bernhard Otto Curt von Prittwitz und Gaffron (1849–1922); veteran of the Austro-Prussian War and Franco-Prussian War, closely linked with Großadmiral (Grand Admiral) Prince Heinrich of Prussia, his frequent predecessor in various naval command stations.
- Baron Guenther Heinrich von Berg (1765–1843) Statesman, Doctor of Law, Judge, Legislator. Invested 28 June 1820.
- Bernard Hebeler (1794–1862) Prussian Consul-General awarded the Order 2nd Class, by Frederick William IV of Prussia, 1842

Foreign

- Mustafa-ed-din Bey, Turkish First Dragoman, awarded the 2nd Class (for non-Christians), September 14, 1855
- Mohammed Essad Safvet-Effendi, Turkish Undersecretary of State in the Ministry of Foreign Affairs, awarded the 2nd Class (for non-Christians), September 14, 1855
- Admiral of the Fleet Sir John Jellicoe, 1st Earl Jellicoe of Great Britain (1859–1935), awarded the Order, 2nd Class, with swords, for actions in China during the Boxer Rebellion, where he served as a captain.
- Captain Edward Henry Bayly, Royal Navy, Captain of HMS Aurora, awarded the Order, 2nd class, with swords, for services in China during the Boxer Rebellion.
- Charles Thomas Jackson, American physician and scientist who was active in medicine, chemistry, mineralogy, and geology.
- Frederick J.V. Skiff, Field Museum of Chicago, Paris Exhibition (1900) organizer, and Director of Exhibits, St. Louis Exhibition (1906), awarded 2nd Class, Jan 12, 1906, for work with the St. Louis World's Fair
- J.P. Morgan (1837–1913), American Banker, honored after giving an original letter from Martin Luther to Emperor Charles V back to Germany, June 26, 1911
- Nicholas Murray Butler, President of Columbia University, for building the exchange program between American and German professors, and winner of the 1931 Nobel Peace Prize
- Professor Hugo Münsterberg, Harvard Exchange Professor at Berlin, awarded the Order, 2nd Class, August 23, 1911
- James Speyer, American banker and president of the banking house Speyer & Company, awarded the 2nd Class, Jan 20, 1912
- His Princely Highness Pakubuwono X (1866–1939), the 10th Susuhunan, ruler of the past Surakarta (now in present Surakarta, Indonesia), awarded the Order, 2nd Class, with Star.
- Wilhelm Freiherr Lenk von Wolfsberg (1809–1894), Austrian Feldzeugmeister, owner of the Corps Artillery Regiment No. 4 and scientist, awarded the 2nd Class in 1861
- Maj-Gen the Hon Edward James Montagu-Stuart-Wortley CB, CMG, DSO, MVO (1857–1934) of Great Britain's King's Royal Rifle Corps.
- Dudley Marjoribanks, 3rd Baron Tweedmouth (1874–1935), invested in September 1902 when he visited Prussia for German Army maneuvers.

=== Knights 3rd Class (1810–1918) ===
Order of the Red Eagle, 3rd Class, with Crown and Swords

- Jan Willem Louis van Oordt (1808–1884), awarded the Knights Cross, 3rd Class, for services to the Imperial Navy, 1850
- Major (later Field Marshal) Albrecht von Roon (1803–1879) – awarded the Knights Cross, 3rd Class for actions and service during the Baden insurrection, 1848
- Oberst (Colonel) Louis Lust, commander of the Captain-Cadet School, awarded the Knight's Cross, 3rd Class, with Bow, by Kaiser Wilhelm I, 12/19/1878
- Captain Hans-Wilhelm von Dresky (later Rear Admiral) – awarded the Knight's Cross, 3rd Class, with swords and ribbon, for actions while in command of the cruiser SMS Habicht.
- Hermann von Wissmann, awarded the 3rd Class with Crown and Swords, September 3, 1894
- Oberst Friedrich von Scholl, awarded the 3rd Class with Crown and Swords, 1895
- Oberst Pavel, awarded the 3rd Class with Crown and Swords for actions in Cameroon, 1902
- Hauptmann (army Captain) Franke, awarded the 3rd Class with Crown and Swords, for actions in South West Africa (Namibia), 1904
- Käptain zur Sea (naval Captain) Pohl, awarded the 3rd Class with Crown and Swords for actions in East Asia, 1905

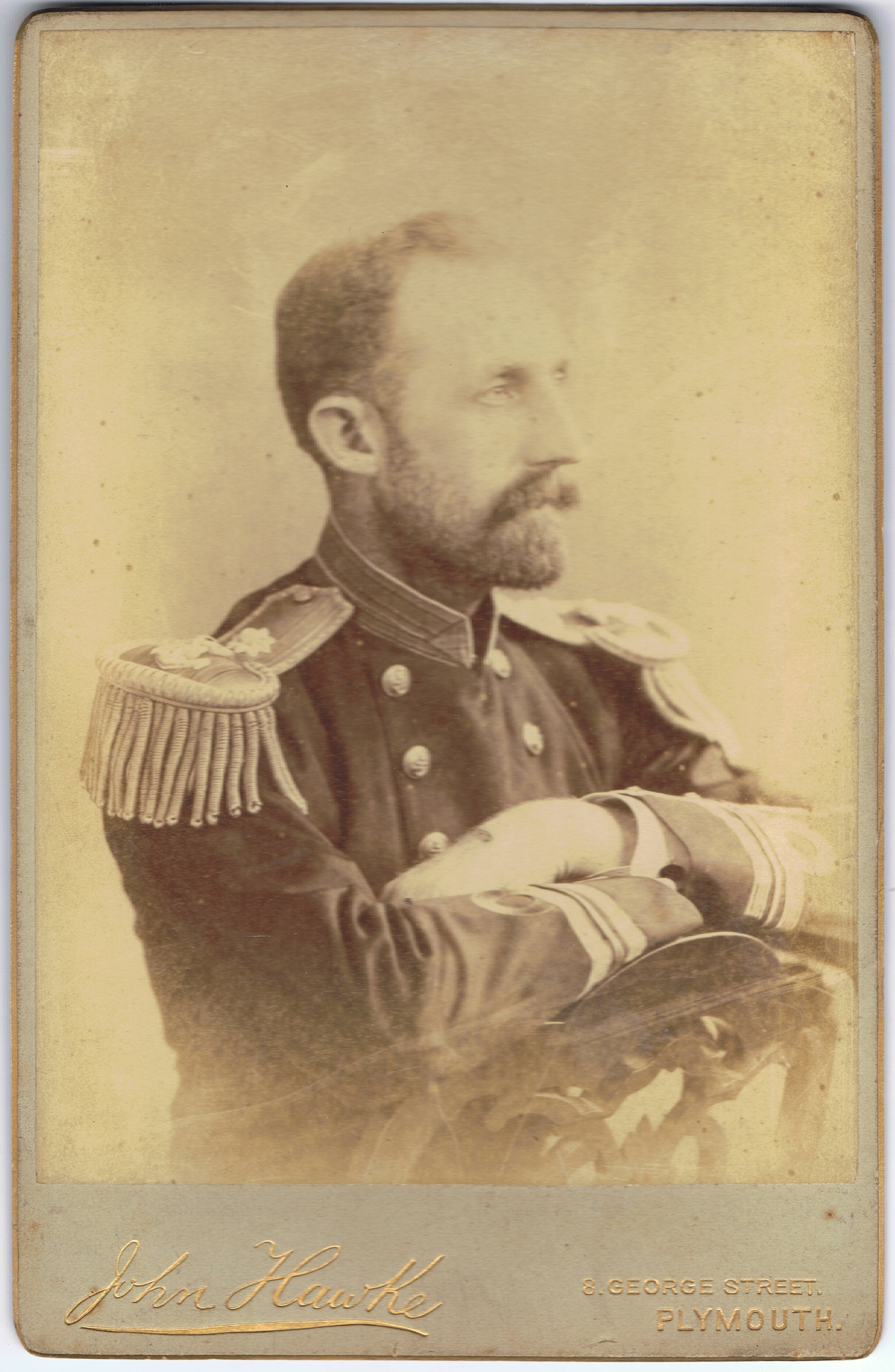
Admiral Sir William De Salis, R.N., awarded the Cross, second class, in 1904.

- Oberst (future Generalleutnant) Constantin Wilhelm Albert von Müller, awarded the 3rd Class with Crown and Swords for actions in Cameroon, 1905
- John Schroers, Chairman of Education and the Educational Congresses, and later Director of the St. Louis World's Fair, 1904–1906; awarded the 3rd Class, Feb 23, 1905, for work with the St. Louis World's Fair
- Oberstleutnant von Estorff, awarded the 3rd Class with Crown and Swords for actions in South West Africa, 1905
- Howard J. Rogers, Chief of the Department of Education & Social Economics, involved with St. Louis Exhibition (1906); awarded the 3rd Class, Jan. 12, 1906, for work with the St. Louis World's Fair
- Oberst Constantin von Falkenhayn, commander of 5. Badisches Infantry-Regiment Nr 113, awarded the 3rd Class, with Bow, June 1913
- Georg, Crown Prince of Greece (Later King George II of Greece), awarded the 3rd Class with Crown and Swords, 1913
- Gen der Art. Konrad Krafft von Dellmensingen of Bavaria (1862–1953); Received the Order, 3rd Class, before World War I
- Gen der Kav Ludwig Freiherr von Gebsattel, awarded the 3rd Class with Crown; later awarded the 2nd Class with breast star
- Oberst (later Gen-Maj) Hans Rttr von Hemmer of Bavaria (1869–1931); awarded 3rd Class with swords, 15 MAY 1915; previously awarded the 4th Class, pre-World War I
- R-Adm Franz von Hipper; awarded the 3rd Class with Crown, date unknown
- Oberst (Colonel) Richard Franz Joseph Haegele, awarded the 3rd Class, with Bow and Swords (two times black, three white striped ribbon), 12/14/1916
- Oberst Otto Ritter von Schmidt, awarded the 3rd Class, with Bow and Swords (2 x black, 3 x white), 12/22/1917
- Rittmeister (cavalry Captain) Manfred Albrecht Frhr von Richthofen (1892–1918) also known as "The Red Baron", awarded the 3rd Class, with Crown & Swords, for earning an unprecedented 70th aerial victory as Germany's top fighter ace of the Great War, April 6, 1918. This was one of only two such awards during the Great War for someone of company grade rank.
- Oberst Klehmet, awarded the 3rd Class, with Bow and Swords (2 x black, 3 x white), 5/25/1918
- Oberstleutnant Maercker, awarded the 3rd Class with Crown and Swords for actions during the Great War, November 16, 1918
- Mathew Kiely, Chief of Police St. Louis, Missouri (1901–1906), received the Order 3rd Class for his department's commendable performance during the 1902 visit of Prince Henry
- Lt.Col. E. H. Swayne, Somerset Light Infantry without swords
- Lt.Col. George Limbrey Sclater-Booth, 2nd Baron Basing, 1st The Royal Dragoons without swords
- Vizeadmiral Alfred Meyer-Waldeck, date unknown

=== Knights 4th Class (1830–1918) ===
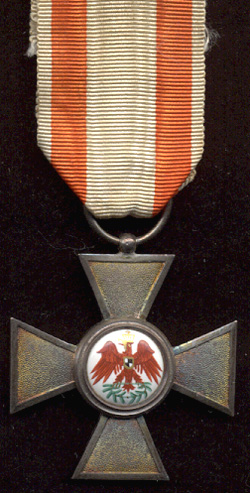
Order of the Red Eagle, 4th Class

- Maj. E.D.Bally, Somerset Light Infantry
- Sevki Bey, District Governor of Aclun (Northern Syria, Ottoman Empire), awarded the 4th Class
- Dr. Ernst Freiherr von Bibra 1854 (1806 – 1878) was a German Naturalist (Natural history scientist) and author. Ernst was a botanist, zoologist, metallurgist, chemist, geographer, travel writer, novelist, duellist, art collector and trailblazer in ethnopsychopharmacology.
- Hauptmann Curt von Brandenstein, 1879–1964, Pour le Me'rite 26.9.1918, HOH w/ Swords, Hessian Bravery medal, Leibregiment Grossherzogin (3. Grossherzoglich Hessisches) Nr.117
- Captain von Dresky (later Rear Admiral) – awarded the 4th Class, with swords, for actions at Miang while in command of the cruiser SMS Habicht
- Hauptmann (Captain) Constantin von Falkenhayn, awarded the 4th Class, for service in the Füsilier-Regiment Fürst Karl-Anton von Hohenzollern (Hohenzollernsches) Nr 40, January 1900
- Rittmeister Richard Franz Joseph Haegele, awarded the 4th Class, 10/21/1901, for service as commander of the East Asian Field Bakery in the Prussian Army; Later awarded the 4th Class with Swords, for actions in South West Africa (modern day Namibia)
- Heinrich Johannes Halke, awarded the 4th Class, 1/18/1886
- Rittmeister (later Generalmajor) Arthur Hay, prior-enlisted cavalry officer, May 12, 1901
- General Wilhelm Heye, awarded the 4th Class with swords
- Leutnant Paul von Hindenburg (later GFM & Reichspräsident) – awarded the 4th Class, with swords, after actions against the Austrians at Königrätz, July 3, 1866
- Charles John Hexamer (1862–1921), co-founded and first president of the National German-American Alliance, awarded in 1904
- Tarleton Hoffman Bean (1846–1916), first Curator of Fishes at the Smithsonian Institution; Director of the Forestry and Fisheries exhibit at the Paris Exhibition, 1900; Chief of the Departments of Fish, Game and Forestry, St. Louis World's Fair, 1902–05; awarded the 4th Class, Jan 12, 1906, for work with the St. Louis World's Fair
- First Lieutenant Carl Hermann Arthur Finster (1865–1929), Author and Diplomat, 1908
- Joseph Austin Holmes (1859–1915), geologist, and first director of the Bureau of Mines, credited with advances in mine safety, and for the slogan "Safety First"; Chief of Mines and Metallurgy at the St. Louis World's Fair, 1904–1906; awarded the 4th Class, Jan 12, 1906, for work with the St. Louis World's Fair
- F.D. Hirschberg, Chairman of Reception and Entertainment, St Louis World's Fair, 1904–1906; awarded the 4th Class, Jan 12, 1906, for work with the St. Louis World's Fair
- Prof. Otto Jaekel (1863–1929), geologist and paleontologist, awarded April 3, 1913
- Obst-Lt (later Gen der Artillerie) Friedrich Frhr. Kreß von Kressenstein of Bavaria (1870–1948); awarded the 4th Class prior to World War I
- John H. McGibbons, Secretary of Awards for Division of Exhibitions, St. Louis World's Fair, 1904–1906; awarded the 4th Class, Jan 12, 1906, for work with the St. Louis World's Fair
- Lt.Col. Hon. George Henry Morris, Irish Guards
- Dr. Ludwig Karl Georg Pfeiffer, botanist and conchologist, 1875
- Premierleutnant (First Lieutenant) Ernst von Prittwitz und Gaffron, awarded the 4th Class in 1864
- Carl Friedrich Rohte, awarded the 4th Class, 8/22/1907, for service to the Crown
- Hermann Aleksander Eduard von Salza, Russian Navy, 1910
- Ernst Friederich Ludwig Scheyder, Amtsrat, presented with Red Eagle August 10, 1911, for dedicated service to the crown
- Frederick Winslow Taylor (1856–1915), mechanical engineer; President of the American Society of mechanical Engineers, who is credited for innovations in management principles; awarded the 4th Class, Jan. 12, 1906, for work with St. Louis World's Fair
- Adolf Werner (Artillery Officer), awarded the 4th Class, 1904
- Lt.Col. L.E.C.Worthington-Wilmer, Somerset Light Infantry
Order of the Red Eagle, 4th Class, certificate given to Ernst Friedrich Ludwig Scheyder in 1911

Ernst Friedrich Ludwig Scheyder

=== Medal for Enlisted Men ===
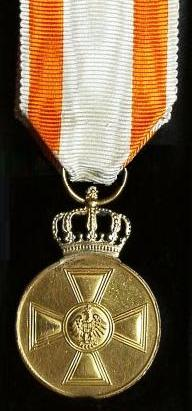
Order of the Red Eagle Medal (for enlisted men)

- Musicmeister Jacob Peuppus, 2. Infanterie-Regiments Kronprinz; awarded November 16, 1900
- Feldwebel August Keller, 2. Infanterie-Regiments Kronprinz; awarded November 16, 1900
- Sergenten Maximilian Büchert, 2. Infanterie-Regiments Kronprinz; awarded November 16, 1900
- Wachtmeister Otto Grieszing, 1. Schwerin Reiter-Regiment Prinz Karl von Bayern; awarded November 16, 1900
- Matthias Kürmeher, 4. Infanterie-Regiments, König Wilhelm von Württemberg; awarded June 15, 1903
- Karl Lemnitz, 2. Fuß-Artillerie-Regiments, Königliche von Preußen; awarded June 15, 1903
- Fortunatus Klun, Hof-Saal-Kammerdiener, Saaldienst, Obersthofmeister Staab, Austria Hungary; awarded 1903
- Adolf Zimmerman, Hof-Saal-Türhüter, Saaldienst, Obersthofmeister Staab, Austria Hungary; awarded 1903
- Thomas Drozda, Hof-Saal-Türhüter, Saaldienst, Obersthofmeister Staab, Austria Hungary; awarded 1903
- Franz Fahnier, Hof-Saal-Türhüter, Saaldienst, Obersthofmeister Staab, Austria Hungary; awarded 1903
- Josef Kramlinger, Hof-Saal-Türhüter, Saaldienst, Obersthofmeister Staab, Austria Hungary; awarded 1903
- Josef Blaha, Hof-Saal-Türhüter, Saaldienst, Obersthofmeister Staab, Austria Hungary; awarded 1903
- Georg Schögl, Hof-Saal-Türhüter, Saaldienst, Obersthofmeister Staab, Austria Hungary; awarded 1903

== Sources ==
- Atlantic Daily News, October 31, 1906. New York: Hamburg-American Line. Available on the Internet: https://earlyradiohistory.us/1906hamb.htm
- Danner, David. Recipients of the Military Max Josef Order in World War I. available on the Internet: https://web.archive.org/web/20090524233821/http://home.att.net/~ordersandmedals/MMJO/MMJO1-2.htm
- Der Rittmeister Militaria, LLC. Internet: https://web.archive.org/web/20080105133048/http://www.derrittmeister.com/home.htm
- Encyclopædia Britannica. 11th Ed. New York: Encyclopædia Britannica Company, 1911
- Encyclopedia Americana. New York: The Encyclopedia American Corporation, 1918. p. 673
- Haandbuch des Allerhöchsten Hofes und des Hofstaates Seiner K. und K. Apostoliscen Majistät, fur 1906. Vienna: Empire of Austria-Hungary, 1903
- Handbuch über den Königlich Preußischen Hof und Staat für das Jahr 1918. (1918 Prussian State Handbook) Berlin, 1918.
- Index of Royal Colonels of Commonwealth Land Forces. Available on the Internet: https://web.archive.org/web/20080202130333/http://regiments.org/biography/royals/colchief.htm
- Journal of the Medals and Orders Society of America, Vol 52, No. 3, pp. 16 – 17. On the Internet: http://www.medalnet.net/Red_Eagle_Order_Haegele.htm
- Marquis, Albert Nelson. Who's Who in New England. 2nd Ed. Chicago: A.N. Marquis & Co., 1916
- The New York Times Archives. The New York Times. January 8, 1898; January 28, 1900; December 25, 1909; August 24, 1911. Available on the Internet: https://query.nytimes.com/search/query?frow=0&n=10&srcht=s&daterange=period&query=Red+Eagle+Order&srchst=p&hdlquery=&bylquery=&mon1=09&day1=18&year1=1851&mon2=12&day2=31&year2=1980&submit.x=0&submit.y=0
- Schulze Ising, Andreas M. Imperial German Orders, Medals, and Decorations. Martinsville, Virginia: Available on the Internet: http://www.medalnet.net/Red_Eagle_Order_3rd_crown_swords.htm
- Treaty between France and Russia, Tilsit, July 7, 1807.
- Verordnungsblatt des Königlich bayerischen Kriegsministeriums, Munich: Kingdom of Bavaria, 1900
- Verordnungsblatt des Königlich bayerischen Kriegsministeriums, Munich: Kingdom of Bavaria, 1903
