= Friedrich Lütge =

German economist and historian

- Born: Friedrich Karl Lütge; 21 October 1901; Wernigerode, Germany
- Died: 25 August 1968 (aged 66); Munich, Bavaria, West Germany
- Education: University of Jena
- Occupations: University professor Publisher's editor and producer Author & lecturer Economist; Social historian Economic historian
- Political party: DNVP
- Spouse: Eva Buchfink
- Children: 1 s, 2 d

Friedrich Lütge (21 October 1901 – 25 August 1968) was a German economist, social historian and economic historian.

He taught at the Leipzig Graduate School of Management (HHL) and at Leipzig University between 1940 and 1947, then moving on to the Ludwig-Maximilians-Universität München where he taught till a few months before he died. Through his research work between 1949 and 1968 he exercised a great influence on the understanding of economic history in West Germany. Together with Wilhelm Abel and Günther Franz he contributed decisively to research into agrarian history in Germany. He was instrumental in ensuring that social and economic history emerged as an alternative strand to the prism of historical materialism that was mainstream in many German universities during this period. From this followed an insistence in his economic research that the subject needs to be studied not simply from a theoretical quasi-mathematical standpoint, but also empirically and in the context of broader historical considerations.

== Life and works ==
=== Provenance and early years ===
Friedrich Karl Lütge was born into a Protestant family at the start of the twentieth century at Wernigerode, a midsized town located in the Harz Mountains between Hanover and Halle. He was the older of twin brothers. There were also two younger siblings. His father was a captain in the German merchant navy who was much involved with Kamerun trade, but died in 1905. As a child, Friedrich Lütge suffered from a spinal disease which confined him to bed for three years. On 23 September 1918, while still at school he found himself recruited into an infantry regiment as a junior officer (Fahnenjunker), but by this time the First World War was nearly over and he was never sent into the fighting of it. However, in February 1919, he found himself taken into the Freikorps ("volunteer corps") of Adolf von Oven in Berlin, and he was involved in the putting down of the Spartacus uprising. It was only in 1921 that he passed his Abitur (school leaving exams) which opened the way to university-level education.

In 1921, Lütge enrolled at the University of Freiburg where he studied economics (Volkswirtschaft) and history on a course directed by Georg von Below. That was followed by a term at Marburg University where he was taught by Albert Brackmann and Wilhelm Busch. He concluded his student studies at the University of Jena where he was supervised for his doctorate by Franz Gutmann. Importantly for Lütge 's subsequent academic career, it was Gutmann who awakened his interest in agrarian history. His doctoral dissertation concerned "The Liberation of the Peasantry in the County of Wernigerode" (Die Bauernbefreiung in der Grafschaft Wernigerode). He was obliged to work his way through his university years in order to support himself and his widowed mother.

Unusually, on 1 December 1928 Friedrich Lütge was awarded a second doctorate. This time his dissertation concerned the history of the book trade in Jena, including the impact of the invention of printing. The work was supervised by Georg Menz. While working on this doctorate he was also employed in Jena as a private researcher by the economist-statistician Ludwig Elster. Projects on which he worked with Elster included the fourth edition of the Wörterbuch der Volkswirtschaftslehre ("Lexicon of Applied Economics") and the Jahrbücher für Nationalökonomie und Statistik ("Yearbooks of National Economy and Statistics"). He also authored a celebratory booklet in respect of the fiftieth anniversary of the Gustav Fischer Verlag (publishing house): research for this commission supported and influenced the doctorate on which he was working at the same time. In 1929 he obtained a permanent position with Fischer as a literary editor and academic researcher. At Fischer he was entrusted with producing a number of works, mostly concerned with Applied economics (Volkswirtschaft) and Economic History.

It was also in 1929 that Friedrich Lütge married Eva Buchfink, a daughter of General Ernst Buchfinck. The marriage produced one recorded son and two daughters.

=== Jena in the 1930s ===
During the early 1930s, he pursued his career with the publisher in parallel with his academic researches, publishing several essays on social policy and agricultural history. In 1934, he published a significant piece of work in which he pointed out that in central Germany as early as the early modern period a form of landlordship and tenancy existed which was based not on service obligation, but simply the handing over of produce. That contrasted with he versions of manorialism that was normal in the northern and southern parts of Germany. He followed this up in 1937 with a broadened study of the German agrarian economy, taking his research back to the middle ages and, in particular, to the Carolingian era. This meant that there had been fundamental regional variations in land tenure arrangements in Germany far earlier than had hitherto been believed. That same year he saw to the posthumous publication of the "Outline of the History of the German Rural Economy in the Middle Ages" (Geschichte der deutschen Landwirtschaft des Mittelalters in ihren Grundzügen) by his former tutor, Georg von Below, using manuscripts that von Below had left behind when he died ten years earlier.

1933 was the year of the National Socialist take-over. It was also the year in which Lütge joined the German National People's Party (Deutschnationale Volkspartei, DNVP), though this party had dissolved itself by the end of that year. He also had close connections with the anti-government Confessing Church. He would later insist that his various longstanding memberships of associations connected with the army, notably Der Stahlhelm, afforded him a measure of independence in his interactions with the National Socialist state. When Der Stahlhelm was forcibly merged into the party's own Sturmabteilung (SA) paramilitary organisation, Lütge was one of many who responded by resigning from Der Stahlhelm. Unlike many of the scholars who preserved their university careers through the Hitler years, Lütge never found it necessary to join The Party itself. Nevertheless, he did join the party's "People's Welfare" (Nationalsozialistische Volkswohlfahrt, NSV) organisation in 1934. In 1937, he joined the party's "Teachers' League" (Nationalsozialistischer Deutscher Dozentenbund, NSDDB). And in 1944 he added the Altherrenbund ("Old Men's League"), a party organisation for university academics, to his portfolio of memberships.

In January 1936, he received his habilitation degree from the University of Jena, which opened the way to a university teaching career in respect of Applied economics (Volkswirtschaft) and Economic history. Because of the amount of relevant research work that he had already undertaken, he was awarded the habilitation without any requirement to write a habilitation-dissertation. The faculty deemed the two dissertations he had already completed in respect of his doctorates sufficient. Receipt of his teaching permit (venia legendi) was delayed till the next year due to differences with government authorities. There is speculation that he only received it at all because of his longstanding personal friendship with the nationally respected economist Jens Jessen who at this stage was still a committed party member (though he would later be executed by hanging). In 1937 Lütge began working as a teacher in his disciplines at the University of Jena Law and Economics faculties.

=== Leipzig in the 1940s ===
In 1940, Lütge was offered and accepted a junior professorship in economics (Volkswirtschaft), with a particular focus on settlement and housing at the Handelshochschule Leipzig (HHL; "Commercial Academy") – as it was known at that time, in Leipzig. He had already been taking a quasi-scientific approach to the housing issues which was at the time innovative. His specialities included housing-market pricing and statistics. In 1940, the year of his appointment, he was in a position to publish a systematic introduction to settlement and housing, which was republished in 1949. it can be seen as the first comprehensive academic monograph on the subject. He was conscripted into the army in August 1941, but was released on health grounds in May 1943 after being assessed as unsuitable for service on account of a spinal condition. He returned to the Leipzig and was promoted to a full professorship. Jointly with Erich Preiser he took on responsibility for the annual production of the Jahrbücher für Nationalökonomie und Statistik ("Yearbooks of National Economy and Statistics"). The compendium was banned in 1944 but returned, still produced by Lütge and Preise, in 1949.

War ended in May 1945 and the western two thirds of what had been Germany was divided into four military occupation zones. Leipzig had been liberated from National Socialism in April 1945 by the US army, but a different division of Germany had already been agreed between the leaders of the victorious powers whereby Leipzig should be administered as part of the Soviet occupation zone. The American military commanders agreed that Friedrich Lütge, as a "non-party comrade" and a member of the anti-Nazi Confessing church should be appointed post-war rector of the Handelshochschule Leipzig. There were additional curatorial responsibilities. When the American troops withdrew from Leipzig in July 1945 the Soviet commanders who moved in were content to confirm his appointment. In 1946 the academy was merged into the University Faculty for Economics and Social Sciences and Lütge, now on the Leipzig university payroll, was appointed dean.

Lütge was no fan of Communism. He characterised the Communist Party and the National Socialist Party as "warring brothers from the same root" ("feindliche Brüder des gleichen Stammes") He therefore did what he could to resist state mandated appointments of party-line goal oriented Marxist professors to his faculty. That led to accusations that he was trying to block denazification and to protect Nazis. Leipzig University nominated him to take over as dean of their new social sciences faculty but the Soviet Zone administration for popular education (Deutsche Verwaltung für Volksbildung) then rejected the appointment because of his political stance. Before his position could become any more difficult, in September 1946, Lütge accepted a chair in political economics at the Ludwig-Maximilians-Universität München and relocated to the US occupation zone (after May 1949 part of West Germany) to take up his new position. The Munich job also came with directorship of the Economic History Seminar that had been created at the university by Jakob Strieder back in the 1920s.

=== Postwar Munich ===
Friedrich Lütge took up his teaching chair at Munich in 1946 or 1947. The next year his colleague Hans Proesler, the Ludwig-Maximilians-Universität München's Professor of Economic History, left to take up a new position in Nuremberg and Lütge took on his former colleague's discipline, now in charge of both the Applied economics (Volkswirtschaft) Institute and that of the university Institute for Economic History. Meanwhile, in the Soviet occupation zone (relaunched in October 1949 as the Soviet sponsored German Democratic Republic / East Germany)) Lütge's 1940 book Kriegsprobleme der Wohnungswirtschaft ("War Problems of Settlement and Housing") was consigned to the official list of books to be weeded out (Liste der auszusondernden Literatur).

Alongside his duties at the Ludwig-Maximilians-Universität München, he also taught at the Technical University of Munich and at the city's then separate University for Politics Munich (Hochschule für Politik München). That was the context in which his 1948 book Einführung in die Lehre vom Gelde ("Introduction to the Doctrine of Money") appeared. He had already, while still at Leipzig, highlighted the unique nature of historical landlord and tenant relationships in Bavaria, and in 1949 he published the resulting study under the title Die bayerische Grundherrschaft – Untersuchungen über die Agrarverfassung Altbayerns im 16.–18. Jahrhundert ("Bavarian Manorialism – Investigations into the agrarian constitutional structures in old Bavaria from sixteenth to eighteenth centuries"). In addition to these agrarian historical themes, Lütge's postwar research scope covered trade and commerce, notably in protestant Nuremberg.

He also re-evaluated conventional definitions of western historical periods through the prisms of economic and agrarian history, both in writing and in lectures, which gave rise to lively discussions between experts. In 1949 German Historians' Day took place at Munich and Lütge took the opportunity to set out his thesis that the Black Death which reached Europe between 1346 and 1350, and the ensuing changes in economic and political power balances that ensued as a result of depopulation, made 1350 a much more plausible starting point for "Modern history" than 1500 which then (as now) was widely – often unquestioningly – identified as the starting point for the modern era in European history. The next year he set out the contention in greater detail in the newly redesigned and relaunched Jahrbücher für Nationalökonomie und Statistik ("Yearbooks of National Economy and Statistics"). He challenged another historians' shibboleth in 1958 when he argued that the decades directly preceding the Thirty Years' War had not been a period of slow decline, marked by a succession of poor harvests in Europe, as widely believed, but that it was only the outbreak of hostilities in 1618 that put an end to several decades of dynamic economic development.

Wohnungswirtschaft ("settlement and housing") was a topic that continued to interest him during his Munich years. Lütge was a member of an "Expert Advisory Committee" to the West German Ministry for Housing Development, and in 1949 published a new edition of his introduction to settlement and housing. Then in 1957 he authored a further contribution titled Die Wohnungs- und Siedlungswirtschaft in der Konjunktur ("Housing and urban development and the economic cycle").

In 1960, he received an invitation, which in the end he turned down, to take a professorship in Economic History at the University of Cologne. This triggered a negotiation with the Ludwig-Maximilians-Universität München in Munich which led to a re-assignment of teaching responsibilities that corresponded more closely with the reality of what was already happening. At the same time his "Seminar for Economic History" was extended in scope and elevated in status, becoming the university "Institute for Social and Economic History".

In 1967, he published in a single volume a synthesis from his various regional studies concerning German agrarian societal structures from the Early Middle Ages till the Bauernbefreiung (liberation of the peasantry) in the eighteenth and nineteenth centuries. This appeared as Volume 3 of the Deutsche Agrargeschichte ("German Agrarian History") series produced by Günther Franz (which would eventually extend to 40 volumes). Back in 1952, he had already published Deutsche Sozial- und Wirtschaftsgeschichte ("German Social and Economic History") which provides a multi-faceted overview of his entire research scope, and a widely used textbook which in some ways represents his most important contribution to historiography. New reworked editions appeared in 1960 and 1966.

In 1967/68, Friedrich Lütge succeeded in obtaining funding for a second teaching chair in Economic and Social History at the Ludwig-Maximilians-Universität München. Wolfgang Zorn was invited to fill it. Friedrich Lütge himself was by this point seriously ill. He died on 25 August 1968. He was succeeded at the Ludwig-Maximilians-Universität München by Knut Borchardt.

== Memberships and celebration ==
From 1955 Friedrich Lütge was a member of the Bavarian Academy of Sciences and Humanities in Munich. In addition, he became a corresponding member of the Royal Academies for Science and the Arts of Belgium in 1966. At the Munich academy, he initiated the establishment of a commission for social and economic history, the committee of which he then chaired. On 18 February 1961, the Gesellschaft für Sozial- und Wirtschaftsgeschichte (GSWG; "Society for Social and Economic History") was founded. Lütge was key to its creation. Till his death he served as its first chairman. Since 2005, the GSWG has awarded a Friedrich Lütge Prize every two years "for outstanding dissertations on Social and Economic History". Lütge also headed up the Economic History committee of the German Economic Association (Verein für Socialpolitik) between 1958 and 1962.

== Producer-editor / Publisher ==
In 1943, Lütge teamed up with Günther Franz to launch the Quellen und Forschungen zur Agrargeschichte ("Sources and Research in Agrarian History") series at Gustav Fischer Verlag. The times were not propitious, but after the war, joined by Wilhelm Abel, they made a success of the initiative. At the same publishing house, Lütge launched another series, Forschungen zur Sozial- und Wirtschaftsgeschichte "Researches into Social and Economic History") in 1959.

Additionally, from the last part of 1943, together with Erich Preiser he became co-producer of the annual Jahrbücher für Nationalökonomie und Statistik ("Yearbooks of National Economy and Statistics"), on which he had previously worked under the direction of Ludwig Elster, securing the publication's future through a difficult period. After Preiser died in August 1967, Lütge became sole producer of it, but his illness forced him out in May 1968. He seriously considered renaming the Jahrbücher as Jahrbücher für Nationalökonomie und Wirtschaftsgeschichte ("Yearbooks of National Economy and Economic History") in order more accurately to reflect the interdisciplinary approach taken under his stewardship, but that name change never happened. In 1953, he also became one of the co-producers of the Zeitschrift für Agrargeschichte und Agrarsoziologie ("Journal for Agrarian History and Sociology").
