= Bavaria Slavica =

Areas populated by Wends in early medieval Bavaria

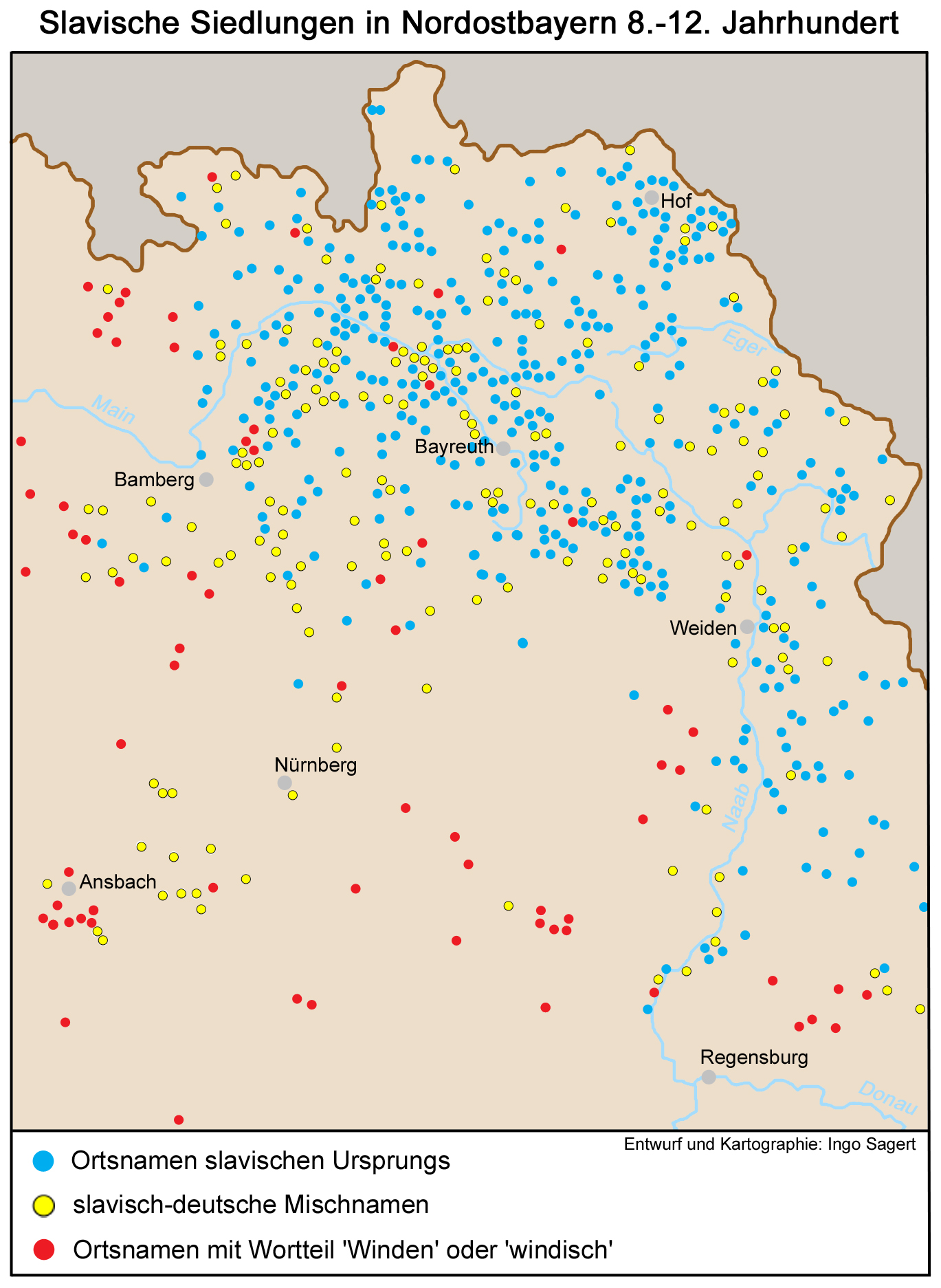
Slavic toponyms (blue) in northeastern regions of modern Bavaria

Bavaria Slavica is a historiographical term used to denote northeastern regions of modern Bavaria that were populated by Slavs during the Early Middle Ages. Slavic settlements were concentrated mostly in eastern parts of modern Upper Franconia and northern parts of modern Upper Palatinate, encompassing upper sections of the Main river basin. Thus, they are also known as Slavs of the Upper Main.

== Slavs of the Upper Main ==
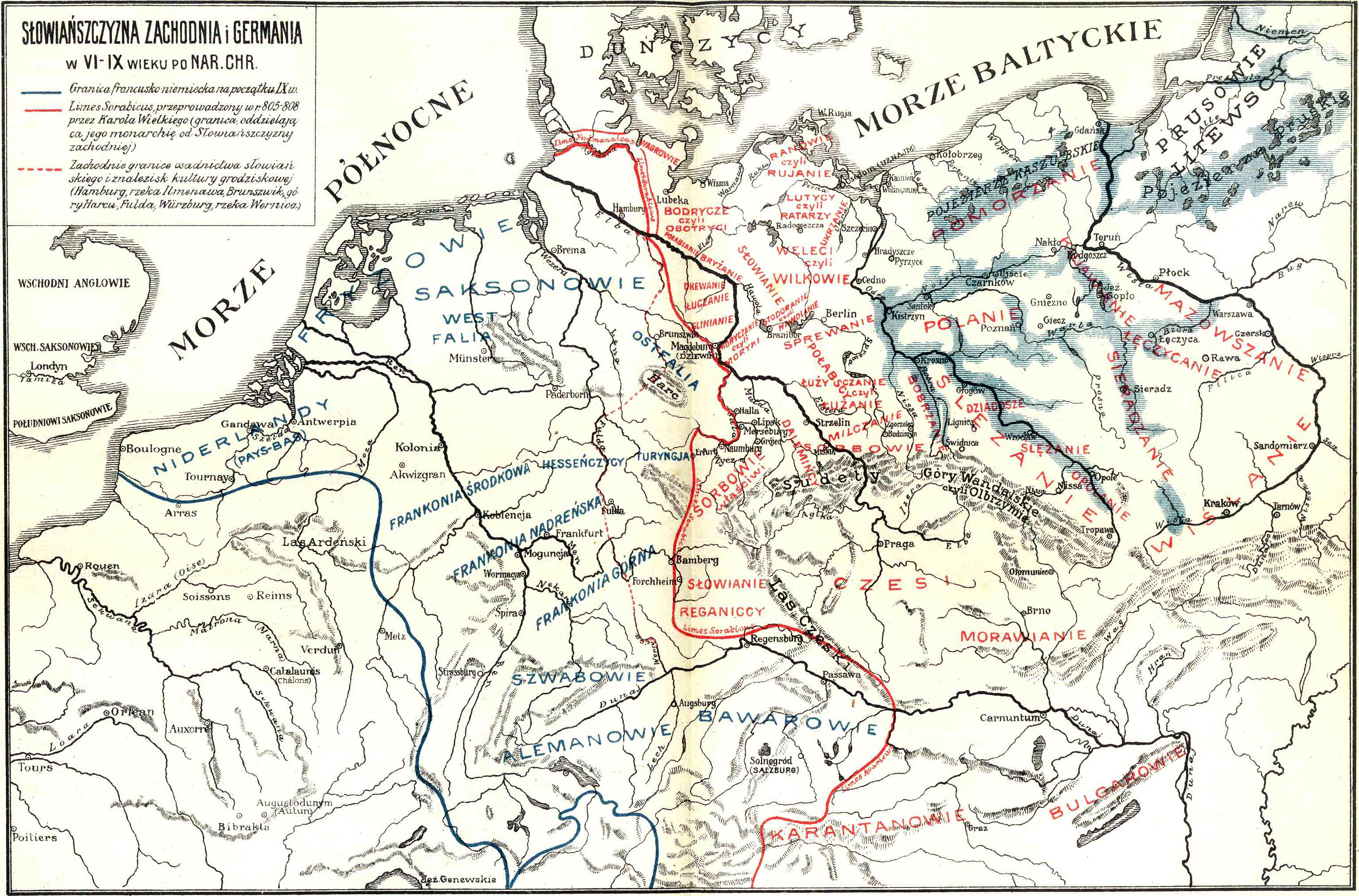
Franco-Slavic limes in the 9th century

Slavic migrations into the Upper Main regions occurred in several stages, initially between the 6th and the 9th centuries, and also later in the 10th and the 11th centuries. Belonging to the West Slavic branch of early Slavic migrations, the Slavs of Upper Main were known to their Germanic neighbors also as Wends, an exonym applied in Germanic languages to Slavs in general. Thus, a document from 826-830 records that it was ordered, already in the time of Charlemagne (d. 814), that churches should be built in the land of Slavs who live along Main and Regnitz rivers, in order to enable the Christianization of those Slavic groups, that were named in the document as Main Wends and Regnitz Wends (Latin: ut in terra Sclavorum, qui sedent inter Moinum et Radanziam fluvios, qui vocantur Moinwinidi et Radanzwinidi).

Slavs of the Upper Main were neighbors to Slavic Bohemians and Sorbs to the east, and Germanic Bavarians in the south, Franks to the west, and Thuringians to the north. Already during the Merovingian era, and later in Carolingian times, Slavic tribes in the upper Main regions were gradually included into the Frankish sphere of influence, recognizing the supreme authority of Frankish rulers. From the 9th to the 11th centuries, the process of their Christianization and feudal subjugation was completed, and also followed by gradual Germanization. Throughout northeastern districts of modern Bavaria, in Upper Franconia and Upper Palatinate, many toponyms of Slavic origin were preserved up to present times.

== See also ==
- Germania Slavica
- Limes Sorabicus
- Early Slavs

== Sources ==
- Andraschke, Joachim (2020). Das Land ist von Wald bedeckt und Slawen hausen dort: Slawische Orts-, Wüstungs- und Flurnamen im Mainund Regnitzgebiet, Beiträge zur ostfränkischen Kultur- und Landeskunde. Haßfurt: Historischer Verein Landkreis Haßberge.
- Klír, Tomáš (2017). "Social context of the Slavic-German language contact: North-eastern Bavaria and the Eger region in the early Middle Ages". Religion und Gesellschaft im nördlichen westslawischen Raum. Langenweißbach: Beier & Beran. pp. 359–410.
- Klír, Tomáš (2020). "Language, material culture and ethnifying on the Carolingian borders: Slavs in Northeast Bavaria". New Perspectives on the Early Slavs and the Rise of Slavic: Contact and Migrations. Heidelberg: Universitätsverlag Winter. pp. 193–273.
- Schütz, Joseph (1997). "Strukturelemente des Mainwendischen". Zeitschrift für Slavische Philologie. 56 (1): 90–117.
- Steinberg, Sigfrid Henry (1944). A Short History of Germany. Cambridge: The University Press.
- Zeumer, Karolus, ed. (1886). Formulae Merowingici et Karolini aevi: Accedunt ordines judiciorum Dei. Hannoverae: Impensis Bibliopolii Hahniani.
