= Germania Slavica =

Historiographic term

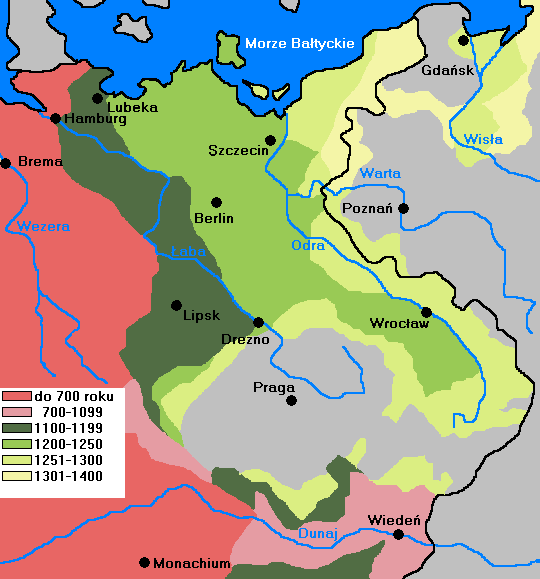
Stages of Germanic eastern settlement, with borders of the Holy Roman Empire (as of 1348) outlined

Germania Slavica is a historiographic term used since the 1950s to denote the landscape of the medieval language border (roughly east of the Elbe-Saale line) zone between Germanic people and Slavs in Central Europe on the one hand and a 20th-century scientific working group to research the conditions in that area during the Early Middle Ages and High Middle Ages on the other.

The historian Klaus Zernack divides Germania Slavica into:

- Germania Slavica I between the Elbe and Saale rivers in the west and the Oder in the east, which had formed part of the Frankish and later Holy Roman Empires as marches
- Germania Slavica II east of Germania Slavica I and west of the Kingdom of Poland, comprising the Silesian, Pomeranian, and Prussian duchies as well as the Neumark.

From the late first millennium CE, Slavic tribes (collectively referred to as Wends) settled in Germania Slavica. The area underwent great social transformations associated with the influx of settlers from the West (primarily Germanic people) during the Ostsiedlung in the Early Middle Ages and High Middle Ages. The consequences of Ostsiedlung would be long lasting with the social structure of "East Elbia" (German speaking lands east of the Elbe river) being dominated by latifundia and Prussian Junkers until the land reform and expulsion of most ethnic Germans following the Second World War. By contrast, the rest of German speaking Europe was dominated by small farms and increasing urbanization.

By analogy, the term Bavaria Slavica denotes the medieval German-Slavic contact zone in northeastern Bavaria.

== Historical viewpoint ==
The Germania Slavica was introduced by Wolfgang H. Fritze as a research term in the mediaeval terminology when his interdisciplinary working group (IAG) was founded in 1976. This term was first used by Walter Schlesinger in 1961, as an analogy to 1932 research term Germania Romana coined by Theodor Frings . The Germania Romana designated, according to Frings, the spaces "in which German language development [...] has been determined by the influence of Roman substrates", essentially the areas west of the Rhine and Neckar and south of the Altmühl and the Danube (Limes).

Accordingly, Fritze formulated in 1980: As Germania Slavica we refer to "the area of the medieval German eastern settlement in the Slavic populated areas east of the Elbe and Saale, insofar as it has been linguistically Germanized". Walter Lammers defined: "The space between the western border of the more or less permanent Slavic settlement and the eastern border of the new German tribes, as they were in the 19th and 20th centuries." The western border was marked by Wagria, the Wendland and the Altmark, then by the Elbe and Saale and the southern border by Upper Franconia and the Upper Palatinate (Bavaria Slavica).

With regard to the eastern extent, Polish research has put the counter-term Slavia Germanica up for discussion, so that there are gears in the Pomeranian, Lusatian and Silesian regions.

The western and eastern borders (defined by language diffusion) of the medieval Germania Slavica are not identical to modern state borders. Due to the different accessibility to research bases, however, at the suggestion of Klaus Zernack, for pragmatic reasons, a distinction was made between Germania Slavica I and Germania Slavica II, separated by the Oder as a state border since 1945, although the historical landscapes of Pomerania and Lebus are intersected by the Oder. Germania Slavica 1 has recently been converted into a “northern” (Mecklenburg-Western Pomerania and Brandenburg) and a "southern" (Saxony) divided.

Ultimately, however, Germania Slavica as a German-Slavic contact zone is not primarily about a space, but about the location of historical processes. It is therefore not a question of the (one-sided) representation of the German East Settlement, but of shaping the area with the involvement of the Slavic population (especially the Elbe Slavs), both in the period before German immigration and during the high medieval expansion of the country.

== See also ==
- Wends
- Limes Saxoniae
- Ostsiedlung
- Sorbian March
