= Carl Georg Schwing =

German jurist and mayor

Carl Georg Schwing (born 7 October 1778 in Stralsund, Holy Roman Empire, died 8 May 1858) was a German jurist and mayor of Stralsund.

== Life ==
Carl Georg Schwing was admitted to the High Tribunal in Greifswald as an advocate in 1804, and was appointed as district court secretary in Bergen auf Rügen. The University of Greifswald appointed him to notary and judge. In 1805, he was accepted into the Stralsund city council. His election as mayor followed in 1820. As a deputy, he represented Stralsund at the Provincial Landtag between 1823 and 1843. In 1837 he was a council elder.

In 1840, he was awarded the Order of the Red Eagle with a bow, which was raised to Oak Leaves in 1855. Schwing was appointed to the secret government council in 1843. The Swedish king Oskar I gave him the title "Hofrat" in 1853 and the commander's cross of the Vasava in 1855. On the Stralsund Spalding shipyard a ship was named "Bürgermeister Schwing" in honor of mayor Schwing in 1855.

== Literature ==
- Schwing, Carl Georg. In: Grete Grewolls: Wer war wer in Mecklenburg-Vorpommern? Ein Personenlexikon. Edition Temmen, Bremen 1995, ISBN 3-86108-282-9, S. 402.
