= Otto Tschirch =

German teacher and historian

- Born: Otto Richard Sigismund Tschirch; 4 June 1858; Guben, Brandenburg, Prussia
- Died: 13 March 1941 (aged 82); Brandenburg an der Havel, Brandenburg, Germany
- Occupations: Historian/writer; Teacher
- Spouse: Maria Beata Schütz (1864–1945)
- Children: Ilse Tschirch (1886-1949); Siegfried Tschirch (1888-); Dr. Alexander Tschirch (1890-); 2 others
- Parent(s): Carl Adolf Tschirch (1815–1875); Marie Tschirch (1827-1906) (born Marie Sausse)

Otto Tschirch (4 June 1858 – 13 March 1941) was a German pedagogue, historian and archivist. Alongside his general teaching, his particular specialism was the history of Brandenburg an der Havel and of the Margraviate of Brandenburg more generally. These were the focus of much of his published output.

== Life ==
=== Family background ===
Otto Richard Sigismund Tschirch was born in Guben, then a mid-sized industrial town straddling the Neiße River, located between Berlin and Breslau. He was the second recorded son of Carl Adolf Tschirch (1815–1875), an evangelical minister in Guben. His elder brother, Alexander Tschirch (1856-1939), later gained distinction as a professor of pharmacy at Bern.

=== Early years ===
Otto Tschirch attended the elementary and secondary ("Gymnasium") schools in Guben before moving on to study at Berlin where between 1876 and 1880 he studied History, Germanistics, Geography, Philosophy and Pedagogy. His lecturers at Berlin included Mommsen, Nitzsch and Droysen for History, Kiepert for Geography, Johannes Schmidt for Indo-German languages, Albrecht Weber for Sanskrit and Philosophy of language with Steinthal. After university Tschirch taught, till 1882, at the orphanage ("Zivilwaisenhaus") in Potsdam. He obtained his teaching certificate in June 1882 and in October of that year took up a position as a Referendary at the Luisenstädtische Gymnasium (secondary school) in Berlin, switching early on to the Saldern-Gymnasium (secondary school) in Brandenburg an der Havel, where from 1884 he had a permanent contract.

=== Middle years ===
1884 was also the year in which he received his doctorate, from the University of Halle, for work on the history of Milan between 1162, the year of the city's virtual destruction, and the departure of Frederick I during the 1180s.

In 1899 he was appointed to the newly created (though at this point unpaid) office of Brandenburg municipal archivist, and in 1902 he was nominated as a professor. He continued to teach till his retirement from it in 1921. As a historian he remained active in various other respects.

=== Beyond the school walls ===
Tschirch became a member of the Brandenburg an der Havel Historical Association in 1886. In 1894 he joined the management committee, becoming deputy secretary in 1894 and principal secretary to the association in 1895. Between 1909 and 1937 he served as its chairman. He was deeply involved in celebrations of the town's millennial anniversary in 1929. Along with this, he was appointed Municipal Archivist in 1899, initially on an honorary basis, but the position was one for which he received a salary between 1921 and 1929.

It was in 1929 that his two-volume work Die Geschichte der Chur- und Hauptstadt Brandenburg an der Havel: Festschrift zur Tausendjahrfeier der Stadt 1928/29 was published, its appearance timed to coincide with the town's millennium. Most recently reprinted in 2013, the work has become a standard work on the history of Brandenburg and the region.

In 1912 Tschirch was a co-founder of Brandenburg's Museum Association ("Vereinigung Brandenburgischer Heimatmuseen"), becoming deputy chairman in 1922 and chairman in 1932. After the museum opened, between 1923 and 1939, he was responsible for running it. He was also a member of the Historical Commission for the Brandenburg Province and Berlin between 1925 and the commission's closure in 1939.

There was a move to have Otto Tschirch made an honorary citizen of Brandenburg an der Havel in 1929, but the idea was rejected by the young mayor of Brandenburg, Ernst Fresdorf. Fresdorf was a member of the SPD (party) and was suspicious of Tschirch's monarchist sympathies. However, Fresdorf moved on in 1932, and during 1933 Otto Tschirch was made an honorary citizen of his home town. Further recognition came in 1993 when a street in Brandenburg was named after him, to be followed by a school in 2007.

=== † ===
Otto Tschirch died following a traffic accident in Brandenburg an der Havel on 13 March 1941. His final decades were crowned by further historical projects and publications.

== Family ==
Otto Tschirch married Maria Beata Schütz in 1885. Three recorded children resulted: Ilse (1886), Siegfried (1888) and Alexander (1890). Of these, Ilse married in 1917 an evangelical minister called Karl Ludwig Wilhelm Lencer; Siegfried became a ship's officer and, later, captain. Alexander became a physician, practicing as a gynaecologist in Wismar from 1919.
