= Ludwig Elster =

Prussian economist and university lecturer (1856-1935)

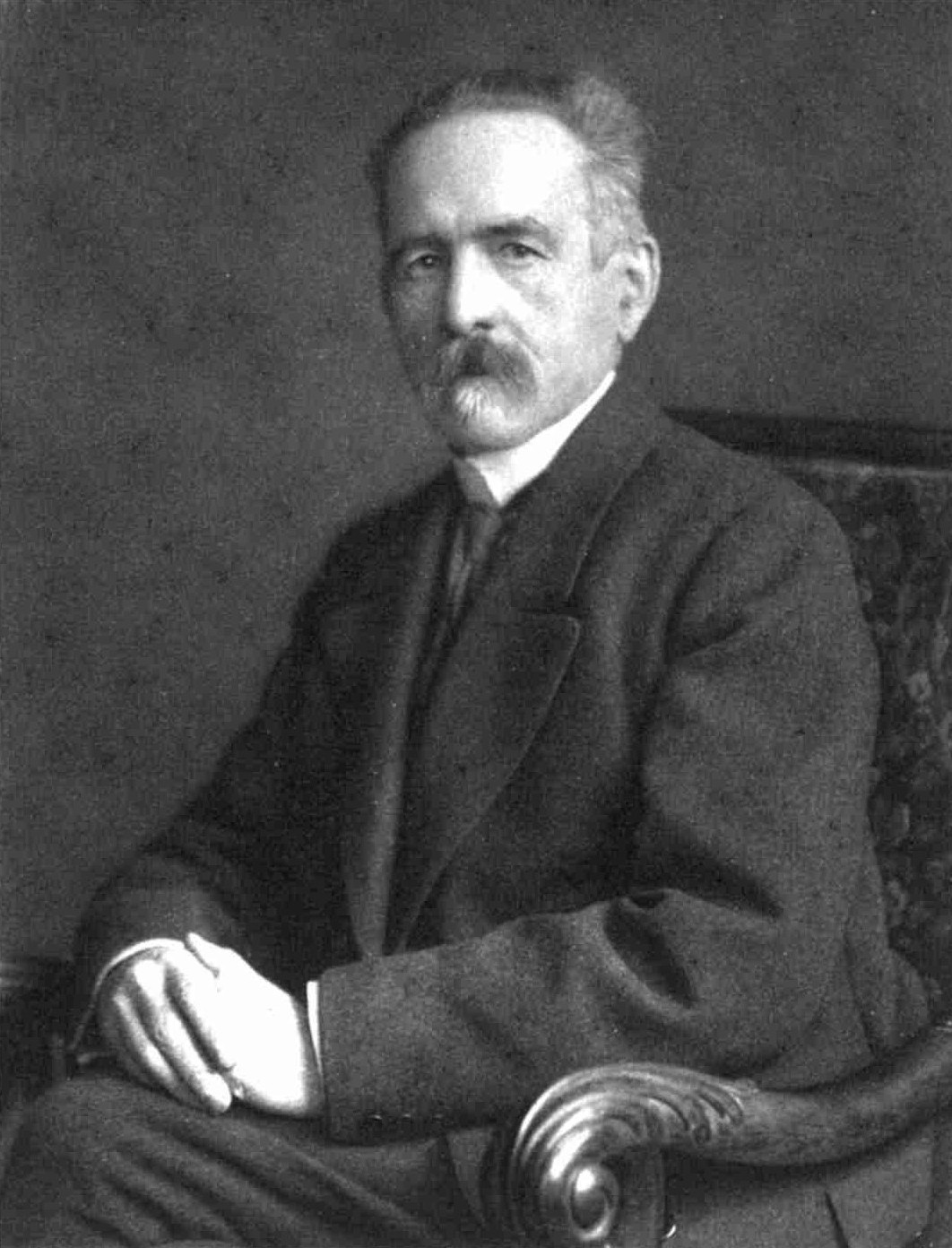
ca 1924

Ludwig Elster (26 March 1856 – 30 December 1935) was a Prussian economist and university lecturer. He also worked, between 1897 and 1916, as a senior officer in the Prussian Ministry for Religion, Education and Medical affairs.

== Biography ==
Ludwig Hermann Alexander Elster was born in Frankfurt am Main. Carl Elster (1826-1902), his father, came from a Braunschweig family and was the son of a master baker: he had worked as a Hanoverian diplomat, and represented Hanover at the Frankfurt Bundesversammlung (literally, "... Federal Convention"). After his sons were born Carl Elster moved into the private sector in 1866, when he became chairman of the Leipzig-based "Teutonia" Insurance business. Ludwig Elster's mother, born Amalie Nolte (1829-1890), was a daughter of the head of the Hanoverian libraries service. As a small boy he was privately tutored in Berlin. Later, like his younger brother Ernst Elster (1860-1940), he attended the prestigious St. Thomas' [secondary] School in Leipzig.

Passing the Reifeprüfung (exam) in 1875 opened the way to university-level education. He studied Jurisprudence and Economics at Göttingen, Leipzig and Jena. It was at Jena, supervised by the traditionalist economist Bruno Hildebrand, that Ludwig Elster received his doctorate in 1878. That year he became a member of the Prussian civil service when he joined the City of Berlin Statistical Office as a volunteer, while continuing to pursue his university studies. Encouraged and mentored in his further studies by Johannes Conrad, Elster received his habilitation (higher degree) in Economics from the University of Halle, an hour's train ride to the south-west of the Prussian capital.

In 1881 Ludwig Elster married Helene Thöle at Osnabrück. Elster came from a Protestant family while the Thöles were a catholic family, but there is nothing in the sources consulted to suggest that this became an issue. The bride's father, August Wilheln Hermann Heinrich Thöle, was a physician. The marriage between Ludwig and Helen Elster produced five recorded children - two sons and three daughters.

After three years as a junior university-level tutor, Elster's career took off in 1883 after he was offered a lectureship with the so-called Technical University at Aachen. Despite his relative youth, the post came with a junior professorship. Nevertheless, before the year was finished he had moved on again, this time to the opposite side of the country. By the end of 1883 he had accepted a professorship at Königsberg. He stayed here till 1887, but there are nevertheless suggestions that the East Prussian academic establishment undervalued his contribution. While still at Königsberg he founded the "Staatswissenschaftliche Studien" series of academic studies. Some of the contributions came from his own students. In 1887 Elster accepted an invitation to move to Breslau. He took a full professorship and a teaching chair in Nationalökonomie (very loosely, "applied political micro-economics"), which he would occupy for the next ten years.

Following the promotion within the ministry of Friedrich Althoff, Ludwig Elster succeeded him in 1897 as "Vortragender Rat" (loosely, "presiding councillor") in the Prussian Ministry for Religion, Education and Medical affairs. The role, which had no very precise equivalent in the Anglo-American national governance structure, gave him hands-on oversight responsibilities across the entire Prussian higher education network. Between 1897 and 1907 his predecessor, now serving as "Ministerial Director of the First Education Department" ( (Note: Ministerialdirektor der I. Unterrichtsabteilung)), was also his boss. Althoff had been able to undertake his responsibilities as "Vortragender Rat" with a remarkable degree of autonomy: that luxury was not available to Elster, who in most respects sustained the widely accepted "Althoff system". There are nevertheless instances where he was able to place his own stamp on universities administration. He promoted further major expansion of the Münster Academy, to the point at which it could be relaunched as the "Westfälische Wilhelms-Universität" / WWU. He encouraged an increase in the study of economics and political sciences through creation of research institutes and new teaching chairs.

Ludwig Elster won various marks of public recognition for his work at the ministry. He was appointed a Geheimrat (loosely, "privy councillor") of the Royal Order 1st class and of the Order of the Red Eagle 2nd class. He was also awarded honorary doctorates from at least three universities such as Münster, Breslau and Kiel.

In 1916, as a response to what had become a massive workload, Elster, now aged 60, quit the ministry and moved to Jena. Here, from 1922 he served as an honorary professor and delivered lectures on social sciences and economics at the university. His political instincts, like those of most senior civil servants, were politically conservative. Early on during the Weimar years he joined the National People's Party ("Deutschnationale Volkspartei" / DNVP). As politics became ever more polarised he was also listed as a supporting member ("Förderndes Mitglied") of the SS (National Socialist paramilitaries). (Note: "Supporting members" contributed not time but money to the SS) After the National Socialists took power, in January 1933, he was required to resign as producer of the "Jahrbücher für Nationalökonomie und Statistik" series, however.

Ludwig Elster's substantial documentary archive is held by the Thüringen University and State Library in Jena.

== Work ==
The focus of Elster's early academic output was on the insurance and banking sectors. During his time as a lecturer he published several essays and books on those subjects. His later publications were more expressly intended to support university-level teaching requirements. With Johannes Conrad, Wilhelm Lexis and Edgar Loening he produced the Handwörterbuch der Staatswissenschaften series of teaching texts. Between 1890 and 1921 these extended to four editions. Elster himself supplemented the series with his own Dictionary of Applied Economics (Wörterbuch der Volkswirtschaft), intended for use by students and professionals. This also ran to four editions during his lifetime.

For most of his working life Elster was engaged with the annually published Jahrbüchern für Nationalökonomie und Statistik (statistical and economics year books). While still a student he was recruited by its then producer, Bruno Hildebrand, for editorial work. From the 1880s he regularly published essays and academic book reviews in it, Johannes Conrad having taken over the publication, following the death of his father-in-law. Elster himself joined Conrad as co-publisher between 1891 and 1897. When Conrad died, in 1915, Elster returned to the Jahrbüchern, now as sole publisher.
