= Wilhelm Abel =

German economist (1904–1985)

- Born: 25 August 1904; Bütow, Farther Pomerania, Germany
- Died: 27 April 1985 (aged 80); Göttingen, Lower Saxony, Germany

Wilhelm Abel (25 August 1904 – 27 April 1985) was a German economist. He is particularly noted for his contributions to agricultural economics and economic history.

Abel's first and most well known book was Agrarkrisen und Agrarkonjunktur (Agricultural Fluctuations in Europe) published originally in 1935. It details the agrarian history of Europe from the 13th to the 20th centuries, focusing on periods of expansion and contraction corresponding to population. Other notable works include Die Wüstungen des ausgehenden Mittelalters, a study of medieval abandoned villages, Geschichte der deutschen Landwirtschaft, a history of German rural life and economy, and Massenarmut und Hungerkrisen im vorindustriellen Europa, a long essay on poverty and famine in preindustrial Europe.
