= S. H. Steinberg =

German scholar (1899–1969)

Sigfrid Henry Steinberg (3 August 1899 – 28 January 1969) FRHS was a German scholar who emigrated to Britain where he worked as an historical author and editor.

== Early life and family ==
Sigfrid Steinberg was born on 3 August 1899 in Goslar, Germany. He emigrated to Britain in 1936 to take up a research fellowship at The Courtauld Institute of Art in London.

== Career ==
In Britain, Steinberg had a career as an author and editor, working for various publishing houses and producing a number of popular historical reference books. His main profession was: "Editor of The Statesman's Yearbook" (1946–1969)

== Death ==
Steinberg died on 28 January 1969.

== Selected publications ==
- A One-Year German Course. Macmillan, London, 1939.
- Historical Tables &c. Macmillan, London, 1939. (Eight editions)
- Fifteen German Poets. Macmillan, London, 1945. (Editor)
- Five Hundred Years of Printing. Faber & Faber, London, 1959.
- A New Dictionary of British History. Edward Arnold, London, 1963. (Editor)
- The Thirty Years War and the Conflict for European Hegemony 1600-1660. Edward Arnold, London, 1966.
- Steinberg's Dictionary of British History
