= Všestary =

Všestary may refer to places in the Czech Republic:

- Všestary (Hradec Králové District), a municipality and village in the Hradec Králové Region
- Všestary (Prague-East District), a municipality and village in the Central Bohemian Region
