= For Valour =

For Valour may refer to:

- For Valour (1912 film), a silent American short film
- For Valour (1917 film), an American silent film directed by Albert Parker
- For Valour (1928 film), a British silent film directed by G.B. Samuelson
- For Valour (1937 film), a British comedy film directed by Tom Walls
- For Valour, a book by Bryan Perrett

== See also ==
- Victoria Cross, a medal which bears the inscription "For Valour"
