= Herwarth von Bittenfeld =

Herwarth von Bittenfeld is a German noble family and may refer to:

- Karl Eberhard Herwarth von Bittenfeld (1796–1884), Prussian field marshal
- Friedrich Herwarth von Bittenfeld (1802–1865), Prussian general
- Hans von Herwarth (Hans-Heinrich Herwarth von Bittenfeld) (1904–1999), German diplomat
