= Friedrich Herwarth von Bittenfeld =

Prussian general (1802–1884)

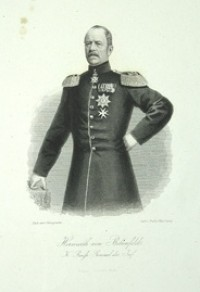
- Born: 13 April 1802; Halberstadt, Principality of Halberstadt, Prussia
- Died: 13 January 1884 (aged 81); Merseburg, Saxony, Prussia, Germany
- Education: Humboldt University of Berlin
- Military career
- Allegiance: Prussia; North German Confederation
- Branch: Prussian Army
- Service years: 1819–1870
- Rank: General of the Infantry
- Commands: 4th Division
- Conflicts: Austro-Prussian War: Bohemian campaign; Battle of Gitschin; Battle of Königgrätz

Friedrich Adrian Herwarth von Bittenfeld (13 April 1802 – 26 April 1865) was a Prussian General of the Infantry. He was known for being the younger brother of Field Marshal of Eberhard Herwarth von Bittenfeld and commanding the 4th Division during the Austro-Prussian War.

== Origin ==
Friedrich came from the old Augsburg city noble family Herwarth von Bittenfeld which was established in 1246. He was the son of the Prussian Major General Eberhard Herwarth von Bittenfeld der Ältere (1753–1833) and his wife Johanna Friedericke Auguste von Arnstedt (1765–1851). Two of his brothers also rose to become generals in the Prussian army: Eberhard Herwarth von Bittenfeld (1796–1884) and Hans Paulus Herwarth von Bittenfeld (1800–1881).

== Military career ==
After attending the Humboldt University of Berlin, Herwarth von Bittenfeld joined the 2nd Guard Foot Regiment on 22 April 1819. He was promoted to Second Lieutenant on 20 October 1819. From 1 August 1825 to 30 June 1828 he was given further training at the Prussian Staff College. Six months later, he became Adjutant of the 1st Battalion. On 8 April 1832 Herwarth von Bittenfeld joined the 2nd Guards Infantry Brigade as an adjutant. He was then promoted to Colonel on 10 May 1855 and given command of the 2nd Guard Foot Regiment. At the same time, Herwarth von Bittenfeld was also a member of the military board of directors of the central gymnasium from 14 June 1855. On 12 November 1857 he was appointed commander of the 14th Infantry Brigade. After becoming a Major General on 22 May 1858, he was appointed commander of the 3rd Guards Infantry Brigade. With his promotion to Lieutenant General on 18 October 1861, Herwarth von Bittenfeld was transferred to the officers of the army. He saw active service when he was appointed commander of the 4th Division on 3 April 1862. He also led the division in 1866 during the Austro-Prussian War at the Battle of Gitschin and the Battle of Königgrätz.

After the end of the war, Herwarth von Bittenfeld was given command of the II Army Corps on 23 August 1866. On 17 September 1866 he was transferred back to the officers of the army. On 9 April 1867 he was appointed governor of Königsberg. As such, Herwarth von Bittenfeld received his promotion to General of the Infantry on 22 March 1868. Herwarth von Bittenfeld also celebrated his 50th Anniversary on 22 April 1869 and was awarded the Order of the Crown, First Class with the enamel ribbon of the Order of the Red Eagle with oak leaves and swords on the ring.

Shortly before the outbreak of the Franco-Prussian War, Herwarth von Bittenfeld was placed with a pension on 9 July 1870, and was awarded the Grand Commander of the Royal Order of Hohenzollern.

== Family ==
He married Freda von Krosigk (1815–1886), a daughter of Dedo von Krosigk on 16 December 1841 in Naumburg (Saale). They eventually had two children:

- Werner Friedrich (born 1852), Prussian colonel and chamberlain of Saxony-Altenburg
- Gabriele Freda (born 1853) ⚭ Hans Lutze von Wurmb, lord of Porstendorf, Privy Councilor and Castle Captain of Dornburg
