= Battle of Königgrätz =

Part of the Austro-Prussian War

- Part of the Austro-Prussian War
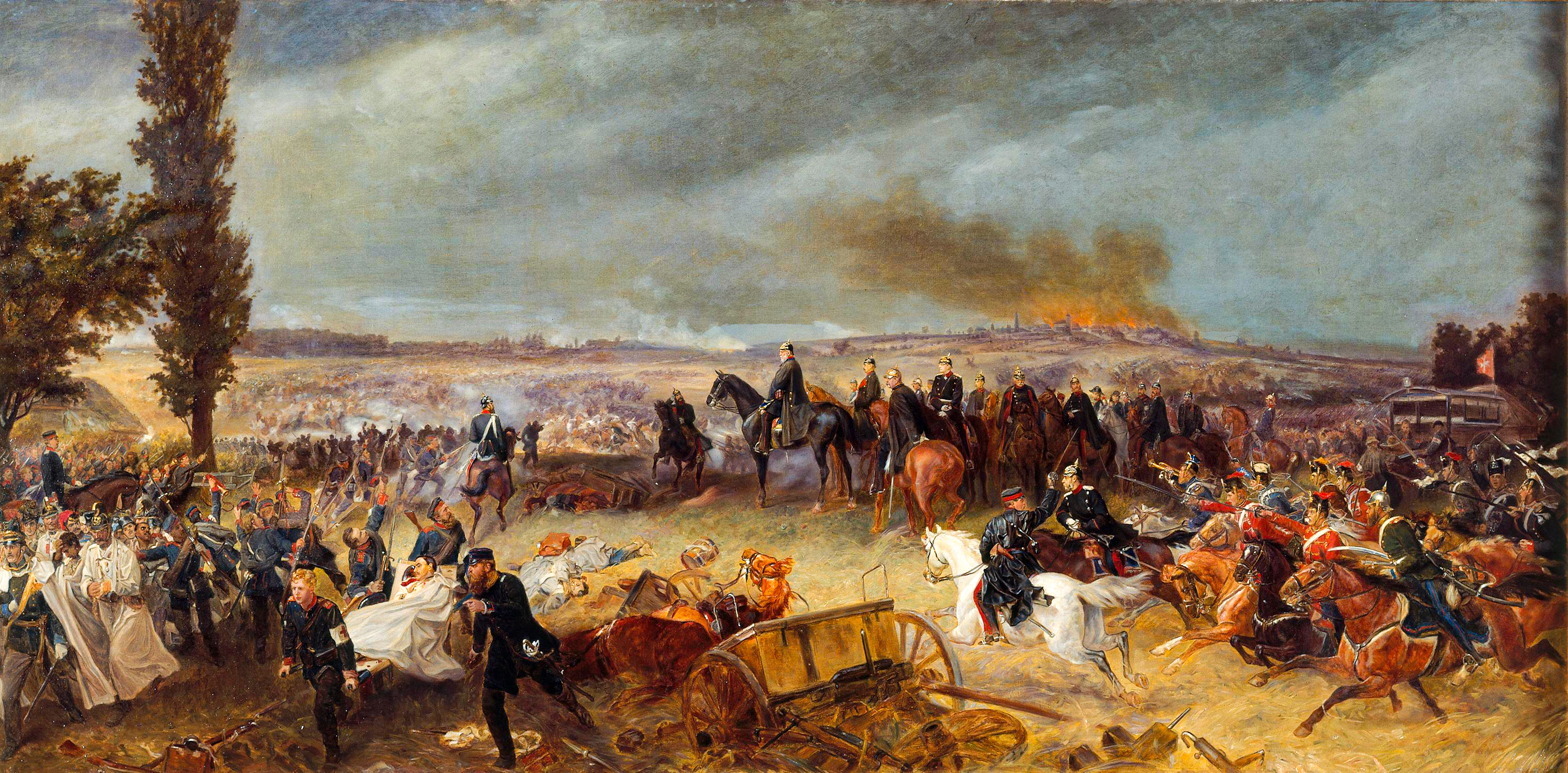
- The Battle of Königgrätz, Georg Bleibtreu
Date	3 July 1866
Location	Königgrätz, Austrian Empire (modern day Czech Republic); 50.27°N 15.75°E
Result	Prussian victory: Peace of Prague (1866)

Belligerents
Prussia	Austria; Saxony

Commanders and leaders
Wilhelm I; Helmuth von Moltke; Prince Friedrich Karl; Frederick William; Karl von Bittenfeld	Ludwig von Benedek; Prince Albert

Strength
220,984	206,000–215,000: 184,000 Austrians; 22,000 Saxons

Casualties and losses
9,172 killed, wounded, or missing	Austria: 31,000–43,000 killed, wounded, missing, or captured (Note: Craig (2003) writes that the Austrians lost 1,313 officers, 41,499 men and 6,010 cavalry, including 5,658 killed, 7,574 wounded, 7,410 missing and 22,170 prisoners.); Saxony: 1,501 killed, wounded, or missing (Note: The Saxon Corps lost 55 officers and 1,446 men, including 135 dead, 940 wounded and 426 missing, while Bodart (1908) writes they suffered 140 dead, 960 wounded and 400 missing.)

The Battle of Königgrätz (or Battle of Sadová; Czech: Bitva u Hradce Králové) was the decisive battle of the Austro-Prussian War in which the Kingdom of Prussia defeated the Austrian Empire. It took place on 3 July 1866, near the Bohemian city of Hradec Králové (German: Königgrätz) and village of Sadová, now in the Czech Republic. It was the single largest battle of the war, and the largest battle in the world since the Battle of Leipzig in 1813.

Prussian forces totalled around 285,000 troops, whilst Austria had 240,000 men on the Bohemian front. Austrian commander-in-chief Ludwig von Benedek had accepted the post with reluctance because he was unfamiliar with both troops and local terrain. Superior training, Moltke's tactical doctrine, and the Dreyse needle gun were instrumental in the Prussian victory; moreover, as a Prussian innovation in European warfare, full advantages of railroad transport in action were taken. The Austrians relied heavily on the bayonet charge. Prussian artillery was ineffective and almost all of the fighting on the Prussian side was done by the First Army under Prince Friedrich Karl and one guards division under Wilhelm Hiller von Gaertringen from the Second Army. The Prussian 7th Infantry Division and 1st Guards Infantry Division attacked and destroyed 38 out of 49 infantry battalions of four Austrian corps at the Swiepwald and at Chlum at the centre of the battlefield. The Austrian army was forced to retreat at 3 pm, before any Prussian reinforcements could engage the Austrian flanks.

== Background ==
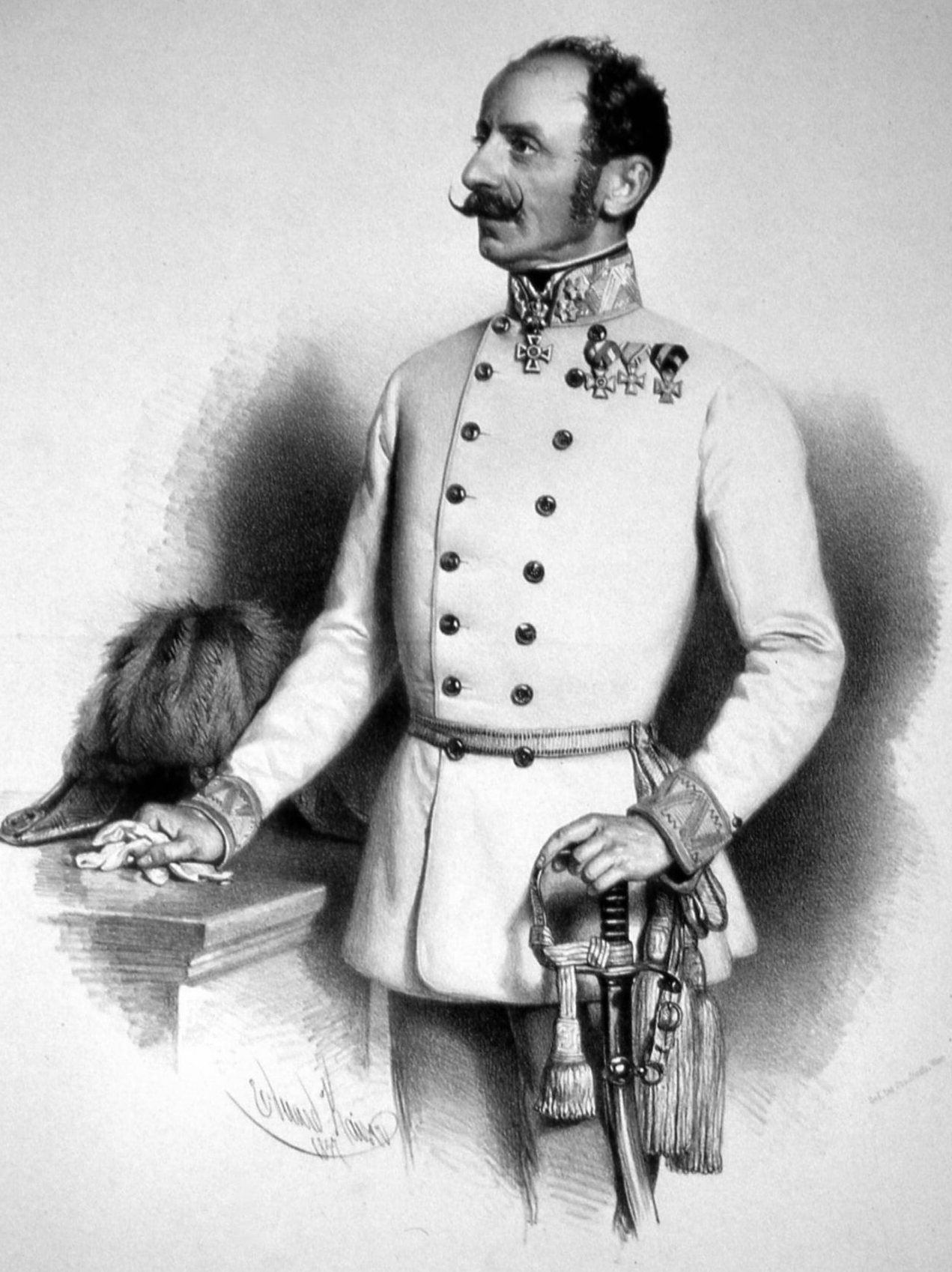
Ludwig von Benedek, commander of the Austrian forces (lithograph by Eduard Kaiser, 1857)

At the outset of the war in June, the Prussian armies were gathered along the Prussian border – the Army of the Elbe under Karl Herwarth von Bittenfeld at Torgau, the First Army under Prince Friedrich Karl of Prussia between Senftenberg and Görlitz, and the Second Army under Crown Prince Frederick William in Silesia west of Neiße (Nysa). The Austrian army under Ludwig von Benedek was concentrated at Olmütz (Olomouc). The campaign began with Herwarth von Bittenfeld's advance to Dresden in the Kingdom of Saxony, where he easily defeated the Saxon army of 23,000 and joined with the First Army.

The Austrian commander Benedek had only reluctantly moved his troops out of their staging point at Olmütz on 18 June, moving north in three parallel columns with the I Corps protecting the right flank. The Austrians took up positions at the fortress Josefstadt was concentrated at and the mountain passes from Saxony and Silesia.

On 22 June, Prussia's Chief of the General Staff, Helmuth von Moltke, ordered both armies under his command to Jitschin (Jičín) near the Austrian positions, a daring maneuver undertaken to limit the war's duration despite the risk of one army being overtaken en route.

However, Benedek was indecisive and failed to use his superior numbers to eliminate the Prussian armies individually. Initially, the Austrians were pressed back everywhere except at Trautenau (Trutnov), where they bested the Prussians despite great losses to their own forces. By 29 June, Prince Friedrich Karl had reached Jitschin and inflicted a severe defeat on the Austrian I Corps under General Clam-Gallas. The Crown Prince had reached Königinhof (Dvůr Králové) despite stiff resistance.

On 30 June, Friedrich Karl's First Army advanced to within one day's march of the Second Army. However, for the next two days the Prussian cavalry lost sight of the Austrians entirely, although Moltke's guess as to their actions – a retreat to the Elbe River – proved correct.

== Prelude ==
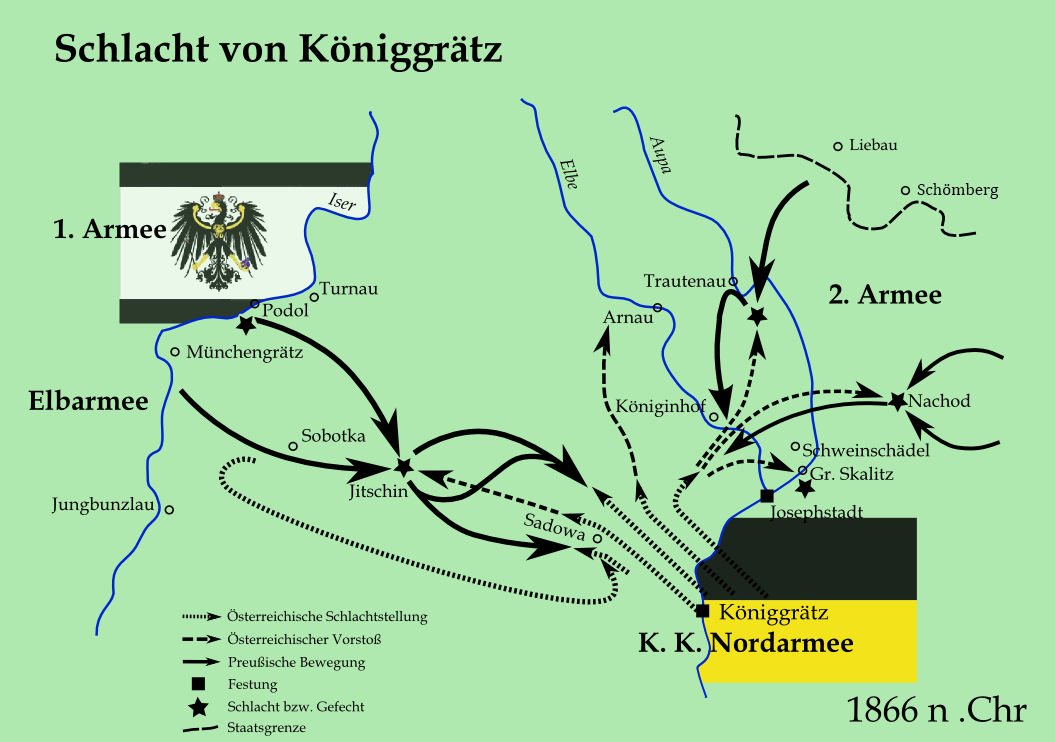
Overview of the battle

Dismayed by his losses, Benedek had ordered a withdrawal and urgently requested that Emperor Franz Josef make peace as the only way to save the army from a "catastrophe". When this was refused, and an ambiguous last sentence of the imperial telegram was interpreted as ordering a final stand, Benedek drew his Austrians up against the Elbe between Sadová and Königgrätz.

The Prussians finally sighted the Austrians on the eve of 2 July near Sadová, and Friedrich Karl planned to attack the next morning. Moltke ordered the Crown Prince Frederick William to join forces with the other two armies at the point where the Austrians were assembled, but the telegraph lines to the Second Army's positions were out, necessitating the dispatch of two mounted officers at midnight to ride the 32 kilometres (20 mi) distance in time. They arrived at 4 am. The Crown Prince's Chief of Staff, Leonhard von Blumenthal, an able logistician, immediately reorganised Second Army's route plan.

== Battle ==
The Austrian army of 215,000 faced the Prussian Army of the Elbe (39,000) and First Army (85,000) on 3 July. The Austrian infantry was partially fortified and supported by cavalry in the rear and artillery units with firing range across hilly, wooded terrain. The battle began at dawn in subsiding rain and mist as Prussia took its position west of the Bystřice river. Shortly before 8 am, the Austrian artillery opened fire, pinning down the Prussian right flank under Herwarth von Bittenfeld. The Saxons on the Austrian left fell back in good order, and proceeded to rain down fire on the advancing Prussian right from higher ground. Herwarth von Bittenfeld ordered the advance guard of seven battalions, under Brigadier General von Schöler pulled back to the river around 10 am and took a defensive stance.

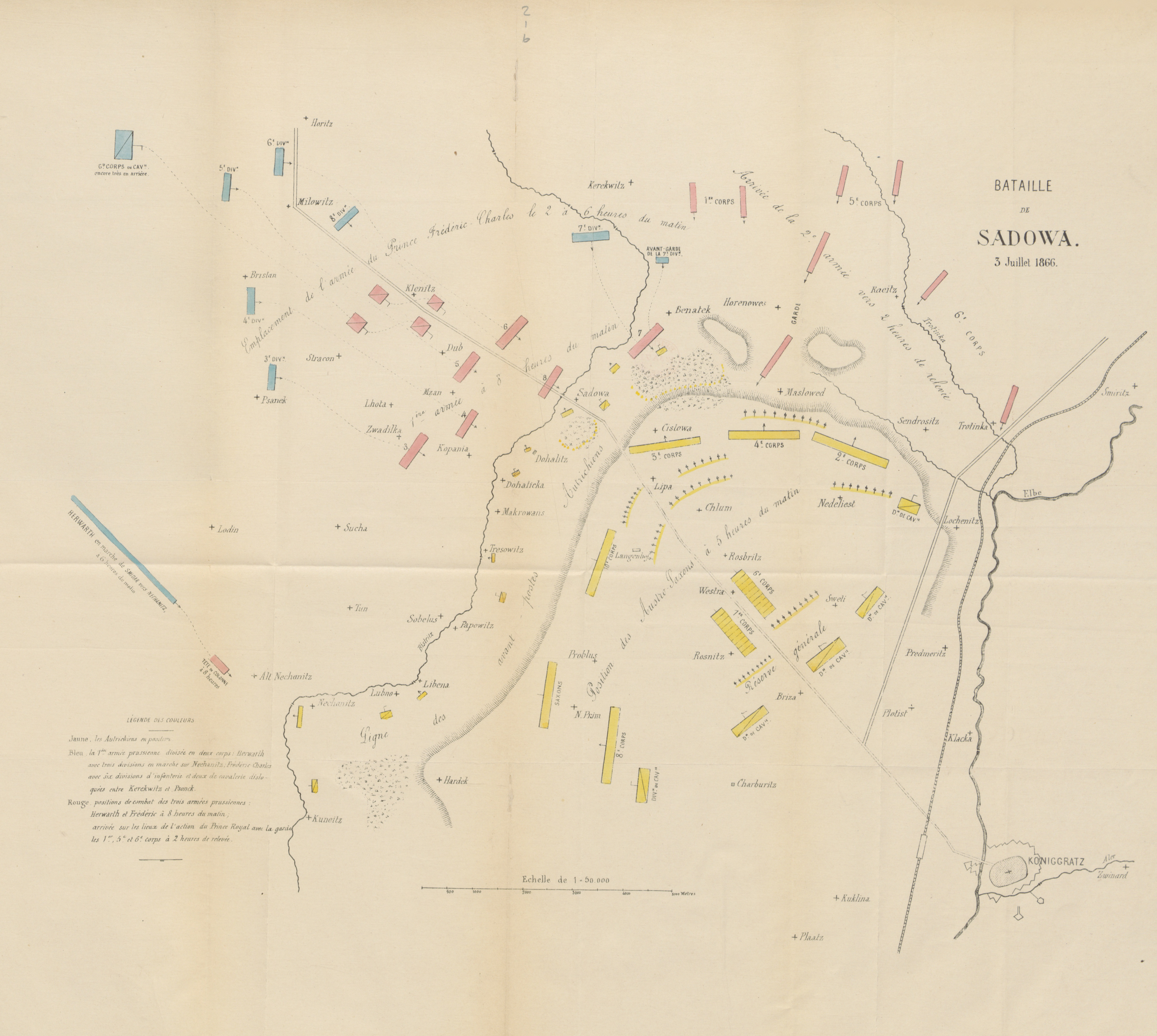
Map of the battle

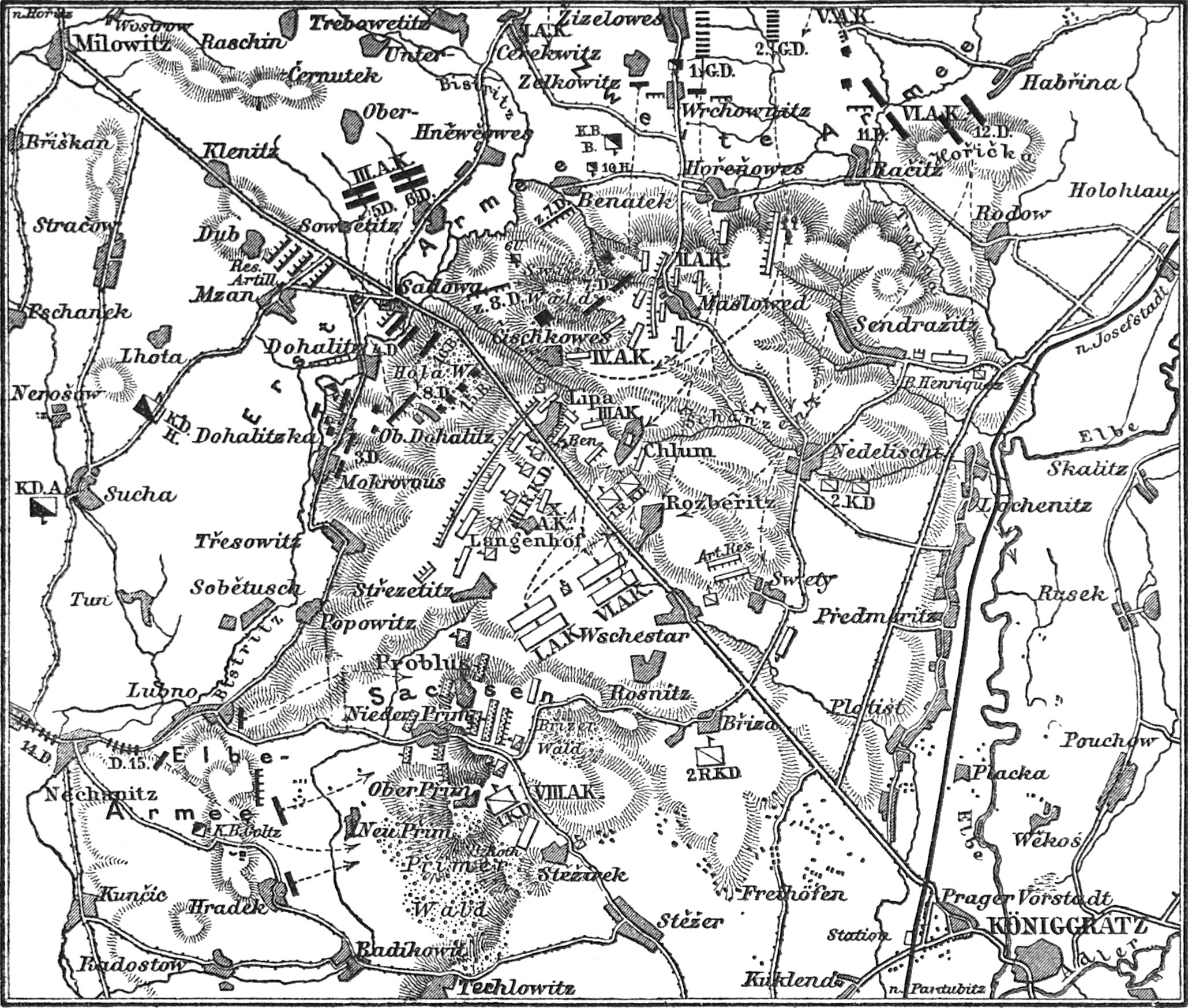
Historical map of the battle

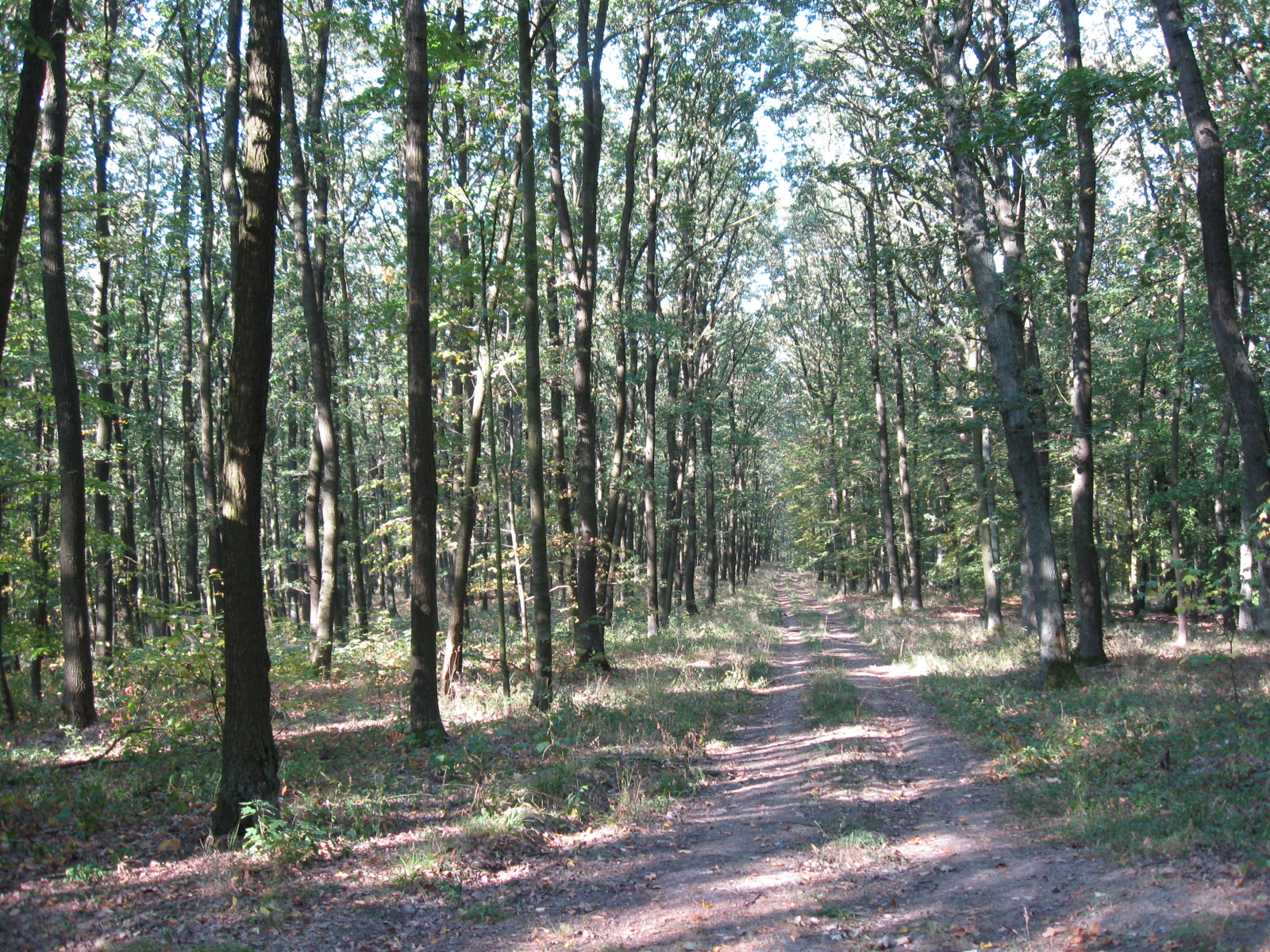
Interior of the Swiepwald

=== Prussian advance into the Swiepwald ===
The Prussian centre, with the Prussian 7th Division under General Edward Frederick Charles von Fransecky, having secured the Prussian rear earlier, led the advance into the Swiepwald ('Swiep forest'), where it was met by two Austrian corps. The 7th Division had to both clear out the forest, and cover the Prussian left until the Second Army, under the crown prince, arrived. The Prussians methodically cleared the villages of Austrian defenders. King Wilhelm I of Prussia ordered the First Army across the river to support Fransecky. Sadová was captured, but a fierce battle ensued in a nearby forest. The Austrian artillery held off the Prussians by firing into the smoke of the Prussian advance. The Prussians were slowed, and although the river was easy to wade, transporting artillery across it was extremely difficult. The Prussian attack was halted as the advancing Prussian 8th and 4th Divisions were cut down by the Austrian artillery as soon as they emerged from the smoke. However, the Austrian leader, Benedek, refused to call for a cavalry charge which later commentators have argued might have won the battle. Reserve units were deployed at noon, but the outcome of the battle was still uncertain and Prussian commanders anxiously waited for the crown prince.

To this point, the Austrian superiority in numbers and position had held the day. Their weapons had longer range, which meant that the outnumbered Prussians could neither advance against the artillery barrage, nor effectively engage the Austrian infantry. The Prussians had attempted to bring three armies together for the battle, but problems with sending orders by telegraph and moving men by railroad had meant that only two of the three armies had arrived in time. The Prussian centre, in the cover of the forest, was able to hold its position, and discourage a mounted charge by the Austrians, who were thought to have superior cavalry. However the close contact of the fight in the forest began to negate the Austrian advantages, the Austrians could not train their artillery on the close fighting, the damp weather made a cavalry charge risky, and the Austrian IV Corps was committed piecemeal to the fighting. At this point the relative strengths of the two armies were beginning to reverse. The shorter range of the Prussian artillery as compared to the Austrian was moot, while the vastly higher rate of fire from the Prussian breechloading needle gun, compared to the Austrian muzzleloading small arms and cannon, was paramount. In addition the needle gun could be operated while prone in defense, and while moving quickly on the advance, while the Austrians had to stand up after each shot to reload their Lorenz rifles.

=== Austrian counterattack ===
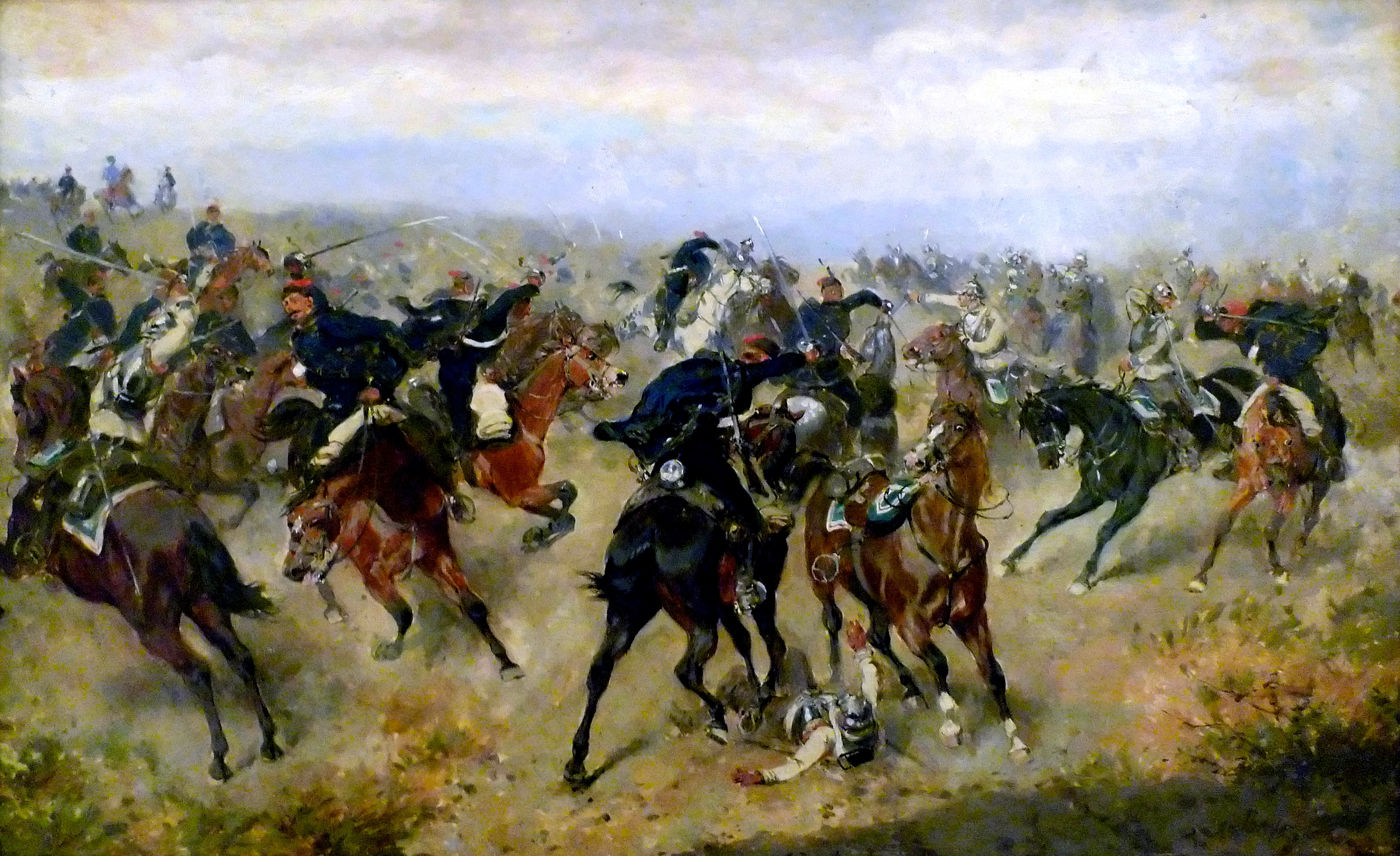
Cavalry engagement at the battle of Königgrätz (Alexander von Bensa, 1866)

At 11 am the deciding moment of the battle came; the Austrian centre began a manoeuvre to flank the Prussian 7th Division, which had pushed back and held off nearly a quarter of the Austrian army. Colonel Carl von Pöckh was sent to drive the Prussians back, and with a fierce infantry charge managed to force the 7th Division back to the outskirts of the forest. Flanking fire raked Pöckh's battalion, annihilating it as a fighting force and killing its commander. The fire came from the 8th Division which stiffened the Prussian centre to hold off the Austrian thrusts.

While divisions from the Austrian II and IV Corps were committed to the fighting, there was no decisive infantry charge, nor did the Prussians present a flank that could be attacked with cavalry. The Austrians ultimately were caught having moved from their defensive position to attack, and their right flank was exposed to the arriving Prussian infantry.

However, neither cavalry nor artillery gave direct help to the Prussian Infantry. Around 12:30 pm two rifled batteries of 2nd Division arrived, and around 1 pm, Oberst von Bülow, part of Army of the Elbe, brought the corps artillery, two regiments, to the battlefield. After 1 pm, Oberst von Rozynski commanded 66 guns in this area. However they were too far to the rear to be used effectively. This kept Karl Eberhard Herwarth von Bittenfeld from ordering a major attack against the Austrian left.

=== Arrival of the Prussian Second Army ===
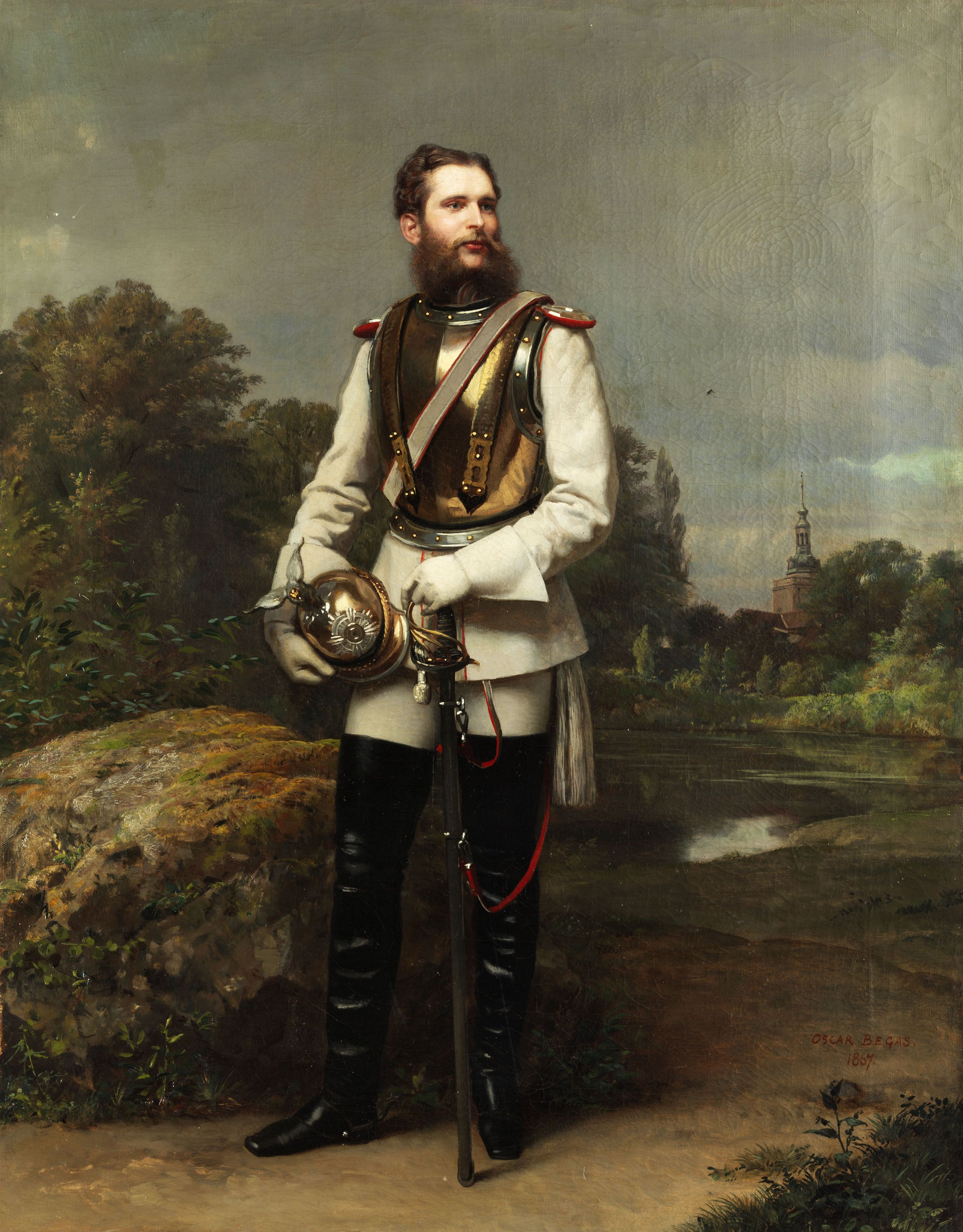
Crown Prince Frederick William of Prussia, 1867, by Oskar Begas

At 2:30 pm Crown Prince Frederick William finally arrived with the main bulk of his almost 100,000 men, having marched with all possible haste all morning, and hit the Austrian right flank retiring from the Swiepwald while the Prussian artillery pounded the Austrian centre. By 4 pm the last individual counter-attacks by the Austrian I and VI Corps were broken, even as Benedek ordered a withdrawal. Lieutenant General Wilhelm Hiller von Gaertringen's 1st Prussian Guard reached the Austrian artillery, forcing them to stop reforming an artillery line and pull back. He had attacked because he saw the artillery as holding together the Austrian position, and his attack destroyed the lone cavalry battery that stayed to fight, and forced the others to flee, along with their reserves.

At this point, having taken severe casualties, lacking artillery and cavalry cover, the high ground in enemy hands and the centre being rolled up, the position for the Austrians deteriorated rapidly. The Second Prussian Army completely broke through the Austrian lines and took Chlum behind the centre. The Army of the Elbe, which had merely held position after the early morning bloodying by the Austrian artillery and the Saxon infantry, attacked and broke through the Austrian left flank. It seized Probluz, and proceeded to destroy the Austrian flank. The Prussian king ordered all remaining forces into the attack all along the line, which had been slowed by the final counter-attack from the battalions of Brigadier General Ferdinand Rosenzweig von Dreuwehr's Austrian brigade. The arriving reinforcements joined the fight just as the Austrians had forced the 1st Prussian Guard back to Chlum. The result was a decisive shock of firepower which collapsed the Austrian line. The Prussian advance was so rapid that Benedek ordered a series of cavalry countercharges to back up his artillery and cover the general retreat he ordered at 3 pm. These were successful at covering the Austrian rear, keeping the bridges over the Elbe open for retreating Austrian soldiers, and preventing pursuit by the Prussians, but at a terrible cost: 2,000 men and almost as many horses were killed, wounded or captured in the action. Benedek himself crossed the Elbe near 6 pm and several hours later informed the emperor that the catastrophe of which he had warned had indeed occurred.

The battle ended with heavy casualties for both sides. The Prussians had nearly 9,000 men killed, wounded or missing. The Austrians and allies had roughly 31,000 men killed, wounded or missing, with 9,291 of these being prisoners. In addition, the Austrians lost 187 cannon and 51 colours. Compounding the Austrians' losses was Austria's earlier refusal to sign the First Geneva Convention. As a result, Austrian medical personnel were regarded as combatants, and withdrew from the field with the main bulk of the forces, leaving the wounded to die on the field.

== Aftermath ==
Prussian casualties at Königgrätz
Unit	Total casualties	KIA and DOW	WIA	MIA
1st Army	5,260	1,065	4,075	120
2nd Army	2,265	514	1,650	101
Army of the Elbe	1,647	356	1,234	57
Total Prussian	9,172	1,935	6,959	278

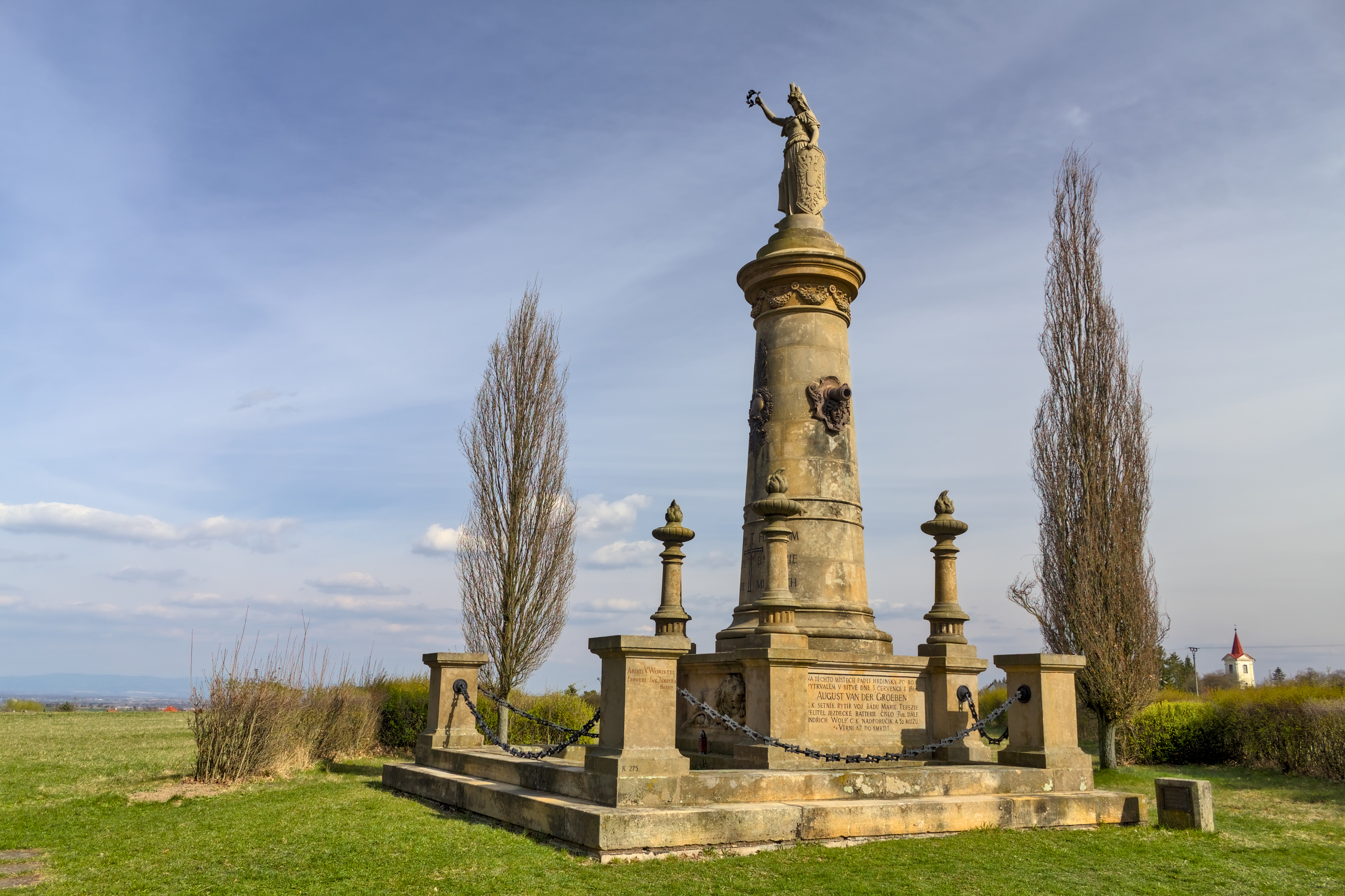
Memorial at Chlum hill (near Všestary, Czech Republic), commemorating the battle

Königgrätz was the decisive battle of the Austro-Prussian War. The Prussians then continued to pursue the defeated Austrian Nord-Armee and fought a series of minor clashes, with the last skirmish being fought at distant Blumenau (today's Lamač, district of Bratislava, Slovakia) on 22 July, just as the Peace of Prague to put a halt to the fighting was being signed. It provided a great opportunity for Prussian statesmen, by clearing a path toward German unification, in particular with the Little Germany (Germany without Austria) solution, with the subsequent foundation of the North German Confederation. The outcome also ensured that Prussia would have a free hand when a war with France came to pass in 1870.

After this Prussian victory, France attempted to extract territorial concessions in the Palatinate and Luxembourg. In his speech to the Reichstag on 2 May 1871, Chancellor Otto von Bismarck stated:

It is known that even on 6 August 1866, I was in the position to observe the French ambassador make his appearance to see me in order, to put it succinctly, to present an ultimatum: to relinquish Mainz, or to expect an immediate declaration of war. Naturally I was not doubtful of the answer for a second. I answered him: "Good, then it's war!" He traveled to Paris with this answer. A few days after one in Paris thought differently, and I was given to understand that this instruction had been torn from Emperor Napoleon during an illness. The further attempts in relation to Luxemburg are known.

The Königgrätzer Marsch was written to commemorate the battle.

The French public resented the Prussian victory and demanded Revanche pour Sadova ('revenge for Sadová'), which formed part of the background to the Franco-Prussian War of 1870.

After the battle, over 900 soldiers were left wounded on the field without medical care. Arriving several days later with a large stock of supplies, Saxon nurse Marie Simon tended to the wounded for 17 weeks. This experience led her and Carola of Vasa to establish the Albert Association, a precursor to the German Red Cross.

There are 475 different memorials scattered on the battlefield and in its surroundings. Some of them are located on the sites where individuals, mostly officers, were killed. Other memorials are located on the sites of graves of Austrian, Prussian or Saxon soldiers, who often rest together in mass ones. The memorials were erected with funds from the families of the fallen, regiments, officers, the Order of St. John, and especially the Central Committee for the Preservation of Monuments from the War of 1866.

== See also ==
- Cannoneer Jabůrek, a satirical song about a fictional Czech participant in the battle
- Königsberger Paukenhund, traditional kettle drum dog of the Prussian infantry, originating from this battle
- Königgrätzer Marsch, a German military march commemorating the battle

== Sources ==
- Austrian General Staff (10 June 1871). Verluste der Kriegsführenden im Feldzuge 1866 [Losses of the Belligerents in the Campaign of 1866] (in German). Vienna: KA, AFA.
- Bodart, Gaston (1908). Militär-historisches Kriegs-Lexikon (1618–1905) (in German). C. W. Stern.
- Britannica Editors (26 June 2025). "Battle of Königgrätz". Encyclopædia Britannica. Wikidata Q5375741.
- Bridge, F. R.; Bullen, Roger (2005). The Great Powers and the European States System 1814–1914. Pearson Education. ISBN 978-0-582-78458-1.
- Craig, Gordon A. (1997). Königgrätz. 1866 – eine Schlacht macht Weltgeschichte (in German). Wien: Zsolnay. ISBN 3-552-04824-3.
- Craig, Gordon A. (2003) [1964]. The Battle of Königgrätz : Prussia's Victory Over Austria, 1866 (illustrated ed.). University of Pennsylvania Press. ISBN 978-0-8122-1844-2.
- Haufe, Kay (14 May 2023). "Die vergessene Dresdner Heldin: Marie-Simon-Grab erneuert" [The Forgotten Dresden Heroine: Marie Simon Grave Renewed]. Sächsische Zeitung (in German).
- Hollyday, Frederic B. M., ed. (1970). Bismarck. Great Lives Observed. Englewood Cliffs: Prentice-Hall. ISBN 013-077354-9. LCCN 77126816. OCLC 100714. OL 4576160M.
- Perrett, Bryan (1992). The Battle Book. London: Arms and Armour Press. p. 237. ISBN 1-85409-328-2.
- Prussian General Staff (1872). The Campaign of 1866 in Germany. Translated by Colonel von Wright; Henry M. Hozier. London: Clowes & Sons.
- Rothenberg, G. (1976). The Army of Francis Joseph. West Lafayette: Purdue University Press. ISBN 0-911198-41-5.
- Tucker, Spencer C. (2011). Battles That Changed History: An Encyclopedia of World Conflict. Santa Barbara: ABC-CLIO. ISBN 1598844296. LCCN 2010032810. OL 25542649M.
- Wawro, Geoffrey (1996). The Austro-Prussian War: Austria's War with Prussia and Italy in 1866. Cambridge University Press. ISBN 0-521-56059-4.
- Wilson, Peter H. (2023). Iron and Blood: A Military History of the German-Speaking Peoples since 1500 (1st ed.). Harvard University Press. ISBN 978-0-674-98762-3.
- Wittneben, Karen [in German] (2010). "Simon, Marie". Deutsche Biographie (in German).
- Zuber, Terence (2008). The Moltke Myth: Prussian War Planning, 1857–1871. Lanham, Maryland: University Press of America. ISBN 978-0761841616.
