= Königsberger Paukenhund =

Prussian military dogs

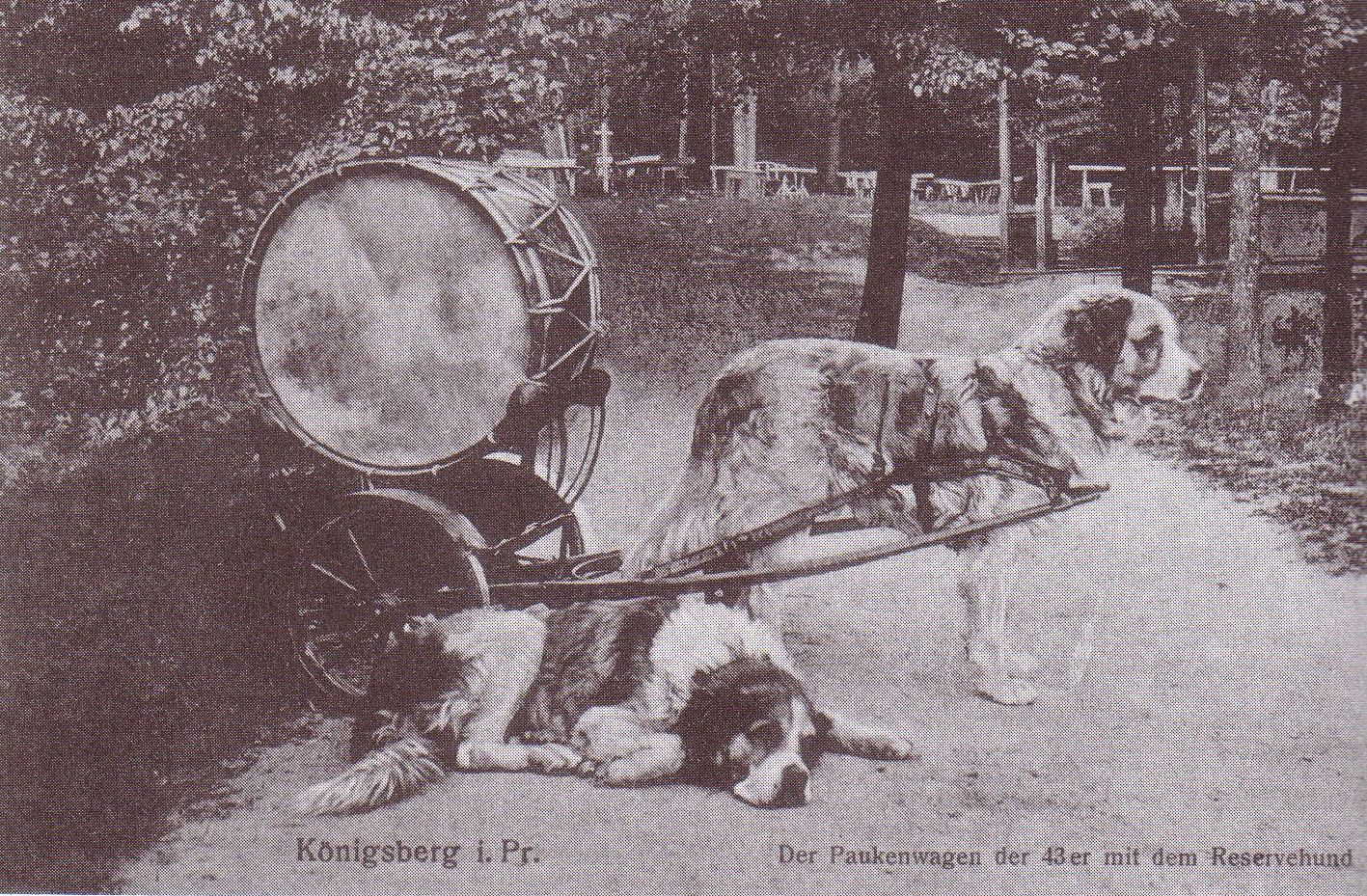
Two dogs belonging to the Königsberger Infanterie-Regiments 43

The Königsberger Paukenhund was the traditional kettle drum dog of the Prussian infantry based in the East Prussian capital of Königsberg.

The tradition dates from the 1866 Battle of Königgrätz, where troops of the Prussian 43rd Infantry Regiment ("Duke Karl of Mecklenburg-Strelitz") overran the drum wagon of the Austrian 77th Infantry Regiment ("Karl Salvator of Tuscany"), whose dog, a Saint Bernard named Sultan, had been shot. The East Prussian soldiers took the drum wagon back on their victorious return to Königsberg, where it received much attention. There, dogs were assigned to the regiment. As part of the musical corps, the dogs, named either Sultan or Pasha" in honour of their Austrian predecessor, participated in parades and the procession of the castle guard until after the First World War.

Following the establishment of the Weimar Republic and founding of the Reichswehr, the soldiers asked for restoration of the Paukenhund tradition. A businessman named Kalitzki donated a Saint Bernard dog to the newly formed 1st (Prussian) Infantry Regiment.

The last Königsberger Paukenhund was killed in April 1945 by his caretaker as the Red Army encircled Königsberg. The caretaker also shot his wife and their children before turning the gun upon himself.
