= Gustav Eduard von Hindersin =

German general (1804–1872)

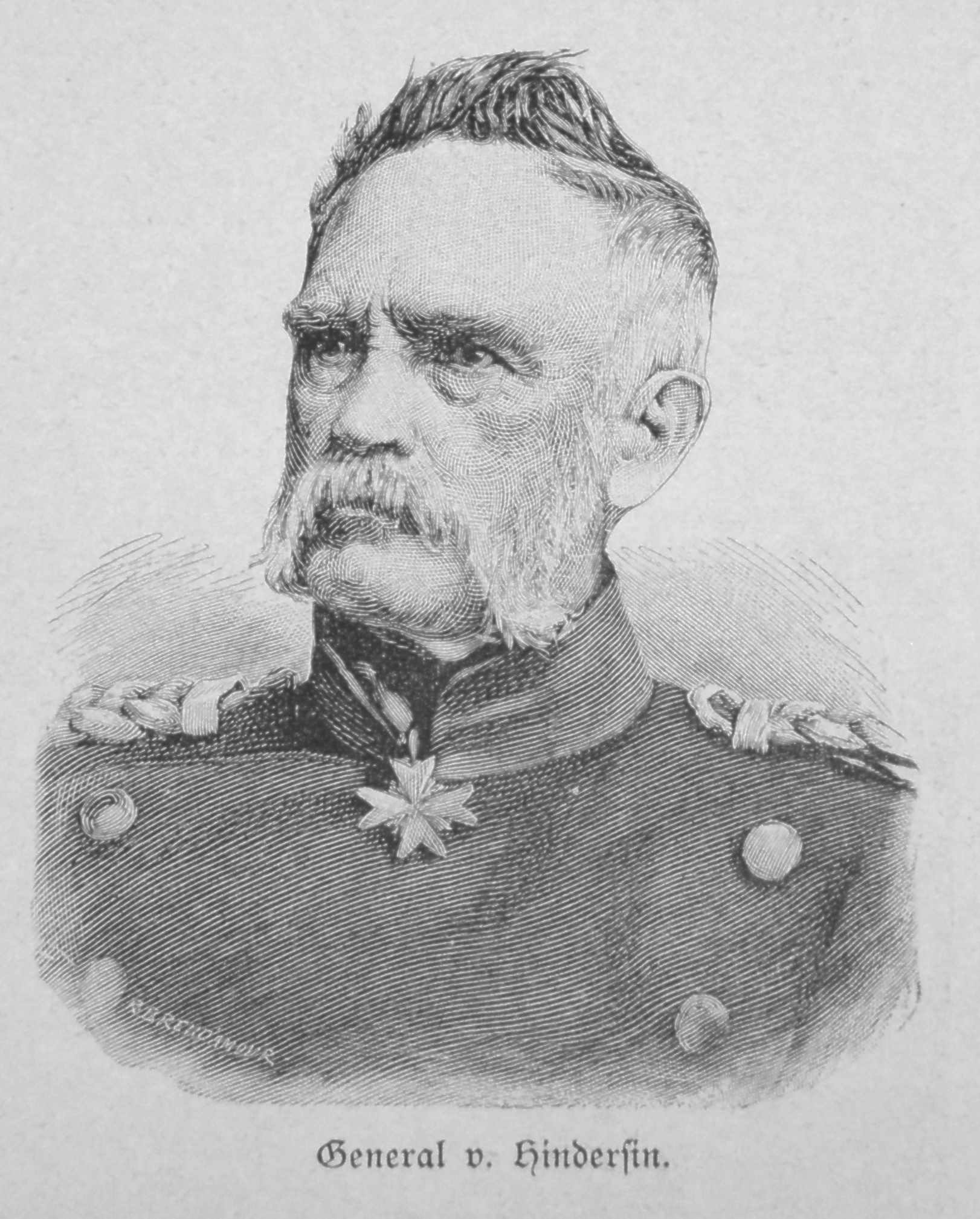
Gustav Eduard von Hindersin.

Gustav Eduard von Hindersin (18 July 1804 – 23 January 1872) was a Prussian general from Wernigerode (now in Saxony-Anhalt). Until 1864, when he was ennobled, his name was Gustav Eduard Hindersin.

== Life ==
Hindersin was the son of a Lutheran minister and received a good education, but his early life was spent in great poverty, and the struggle for existence developed in him an iron strength of character. Entering the Prussian artillery in 1820, he became an officer in 1825. From 1830 to 1837 he attended the Prussian Military Academy at Berlin, and in 1841, while still a subaltern, he was posted to the great General Staff, in which he afterwards directed the topographical section.

In 1849 Hindersin served with the rank of major on the staff of General Peucker, who commanded a federal corps in the suppression of the Baden insurrection. He fell into the hands of the insurgents at the action of Ladenburg, but was released just before the fall of Rastatt. In the Second Schleswig War of 1864, Hindersin, now a lieutenant-general, directed the artillery operations against the lines of Düppel, and for his services was ennobled by King William I. Soon afterwards he became inspector-general of artillery.

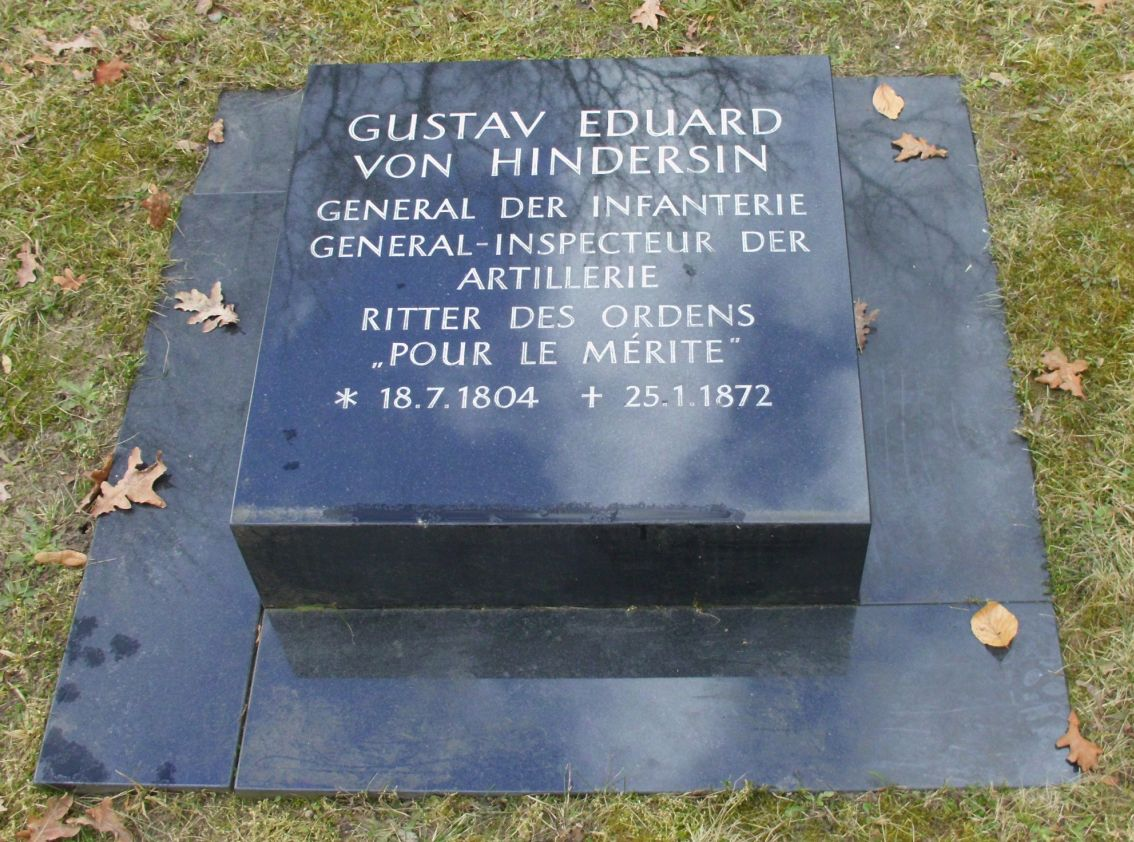
Tombstone of General von Hindersin

Hindersin's experience at Düppel had convinced him that the days of the smooth-bore gun were past, and he now devoted himself with unremitting zeal to the rearmament and reorganization of the Prussian artillery. The available funds were small, and grudgingly voted by the parliament. There was a strong feeling moreover that the smooth-bore was still tactically superior to its rival. There was no practical training for war in either the field or the fortress artillery units. The latter had made scarcely any progress since the days of Frederick the Great, and before Hindersin's appointment had practised with the same guns in the same bastion year after year.

All this was altered, the whole foot-artillery was reorganized, manoeuvres were instituted, and the smooth-bores were, except for ditch defence, eliminated from the armament of the Prussian fortresses. But far more important was his work in connection with the field and horse batteries. In 1864 only one battery in four had rifled guns, but by the unrelenting energy of Hindersin the outbreak of the Austro-Prussian War one and a half years later found the Prussians with ten in every sixteen batteries armed with the new weapon.

The battles of 1866 showed, besides the superiority of the rifled gun, a very marked absence of tactical efficiency in the Prussian artillery, which was almost always outmatched by that of the enemy. Hindersin had pleaded, in season and out of season, for the establishment of a school of gunnery; and in spite of want of funds, such a school had already been established. After 1866, however, more support was obtained, and the improvement in the Prussian field artillery between 1866 and 1870 was extraordinary, even though there had not been time for the work of the school, to leaven the whole arm.

Indeed, the German artillery played by far the most important part in the victories of the Franco-Prussian War. Hindersin accompanied the king's headquarters as chief of artillery, as he had done in 1866, and was present at Gravelotte, Sedan and the siege of Paris. But his work, which was now accomplished, had worn out his physical powers, and he died in 1872 at Berlin.

== Family ==
Hindersin married Ida Stelter (1824–1904) on October 8, 1844 in Königsberg. The marriage resulted in the following children:

- Gustav Otto Friedrich (1845–1853)
- Ida Mathilde Emma (1846–1870) married Richard Blume, retired Major (1837–1889), son of Johann Heinrich Julius Blume, on October 8, 1869
- Helena Charlotte Wilhelmine (1848–1925) married Johann Karl Louis Mederacke, Saxon landowner
- Otto Friedrich (1851–1870), Prussian Second Lieutenant, killed in the Battle of Gravelotte
- Alfred Ludwig Franz (1852–1853)
- Rosa Marie (1854–1926)
- Marie Anna (*1857) married Kurt Delbrück, pastor and writer, on October 14, 1888
- Friedrich Wilhelm (1858–1936), German jurist and writer
- Richard Botho (1860–1931), Prussian Major, Lord of Dalkau, married Davide Eveline von Hansemann (*1867) on June 23, 1890
- Magda Luise (1865–1936)

== Notes ==
Military offices
Preceded by Karl Friedrich Ludwig von Hahn	Inspector General of the Artillery; 20 December 1864 – 25 January 1872	Succeeded by Eugen Anton Theophil von Podbielski
