= Hans von Bülow (general) =

Prussian general

- Bülow in c. 1880
- Born: 27 February 1816; Ossecken, Kingdom of Prussia, German Confederation
- Died: 9 December 1897 (aged 81); Berlin, German Empire
- Military career
- Allegiance: Kingdom of Prussia; German Empire
- Branch: Prussian Army; Imperial German Army
- Service years: 1833–1882
- Rank: General der Artillerie
- Conflicts: Austro-Prussian War: Battle of Münchengrätz; Battle of Königgrätz; Franco-Prussian War
- Awards: Pour le Mérite

Hans Adolf Julius von Bülow (1816–1897) was a General of the Artillery in the Imperial German Army. He was the Inspector-General of Artillery from 1879 to 1882. He retired when he had conflicts with Georg von Kameke, the Minister of War.

== Biography ==
Hans von Bülow was born in the Kingdom of Prussia as first-born of his father, Werner Ludwig von Bülow. He had one younger sister, and one younger brother. After serving as cadet, he became a second lieutenant on 5 August 1833. During the time of peace, Bülow increased his knowledge and his skills as he rose the ranks. He was promoted to First Lieutenant in 1844, Hauptmann in 1851, and Major in 1858. In 1859, he became commander of the fortress battalion of the 6th Artillery Regiment. In 1861, he became Oberstleutnant and in 1864, he got command of the 7th Field Artillery Regiment. On 18 June 1865, Bülow was promoted to Oberst.

He participated in the Austro-Prussian War at the head of his regiment, which was part of the Army of the Elbe. Bülow had learned from Zivar that Eisenach had been re-seated during the night, but only by 2 battalions. Under these circumstances he thought he could deviate from the order he had received to return to the camp and instead advanced with his brigade as far as Lupnik and Stochausen close to Eises. At the same time, 1 battalion, 1 pioneer detachment, 1 squadron, 2 cannons, the former on wagons, were sent to Mechterstadt to destroy the railway and to prevent any movement from Gotha. Bülow saw action in the Battle of Münchengrätz. During the Battle of Königgrätz he brought the corps artillery, two regiments, to the battlefield around 12:30. However they were too far to the rear to be used effectively. This kept Karl Eberhard Herwarth von Bittenfeld from ordering a major attack against the Austrians. For his services he was awarded 3rd class of Order of the Crown on 20 September 1866.

Bülow was promoted to Generalmajor on 18 June 1869. In 1869, Bülow became a Knight of Honour of the Order of Saint John. Bülow took part in the Franco-Prussian War, during which he played a more important role. He became commander of the III Corps's Reserve Artillery. He participated in Battle of Mars-la-Tour and was awarded with both classes of the Iron Cross. Afterwards, on 21 September 1871, von Bülow became commander of 1st Guards Field Artillery Brigade. On the same day, Bülow ordered both field batteries and horse artillery to trot forward to Vernéville, to reinforce IX Corps. He distinguished himself by the new usage of artillery during the Franco-Prussian War. Bülow knew how to keep in perfect fighting condition without suffering great losses; during the Second Battle of Orléans, his insightful leadership succeeded in driving the enemy. For his wartime services he received the prestigious Pour le Mérite on 2 December 1872.

He was promoted to Generalleutnant in September 1873. As a Generalleutnant, Bülow was awarded the Order of the Iron Crown (first class), the Order of the Red Eagle (second class), and the Grand Cross of the Albert Order. After the death of Eugen Anton Theophil von Podbielski, Bülow proceeded him as Inspector General of Artillery. However, he had conflicts with Prussian Minister of War Georg von Kameke and retired on 12 December 1882 with the character of a General of the Infantry. He resided at Berlin after his retirement.

On the 25th anniversary of Mars-la-Tour, Kaiser Wilhelm II awarded him the rank of General der Artillerie. He died on 9 December 1897 in Berlin.

== Honours ==
=== Prussian Orders ===
Kingdom of Prussia

- Order of the Red Eagle 2nd Class
- Order of the Crown 3rd Class
- Pour le Mérite (military), 2 December 1872
- 1870 Iron Cross 1st & 2nd Class
- Order of Saint John, 1869
- Service Award Cross

=== Other German States ===
Kingdom of Saxony

- Grand Cross of Albert Order

=== Foreign Orders ===
Austria-Hungary

- Order of the Iron Crown 1st Class

== Bibliography ==
- Magnus von Eberhardt: "Hans von Bülow". In: Pomeranian Life Pictures. Volume II, Saunier, Stettin 1936, pp. 144–159.
- Kurt von Priesdorff: Soldatisches Führertum. Volume 8, Hanseatische Verlagsanstalt Hamburg, undated [Hamburg], undated [1941], pp. 103–105, no. 2501.
- Prussian General Staff (1872). The Campaign of 1866 in Germany.
- Prussian General Staff (1876). The Franco-German War, 1870-1871 ..., Volume 1, Issue 2.
- Prussian General Staff (1867). Der Feldzug Con 1866 in Deutschland, Part 1 (in German).
- Vierhaus, Rudolf (2011). Brann - Einslin (in German). ISBN 978-3598250323.
- Meyer, Hermann Julius (1884). Meyers Konversations-Lexikon: Eine Encyklopädie des allgemeinen ..., Volume 21 (in German).

Military offices
| Preceded by Eugen Anton Theophil von Podbielski | Inspector-General of the Artillery; 6 November 1879 – 11 December 1882 | Succeeded by Julius von Voigts-Rhetz |
