= Eugen Anton Theophil von Podbielski =

Prussian Army general

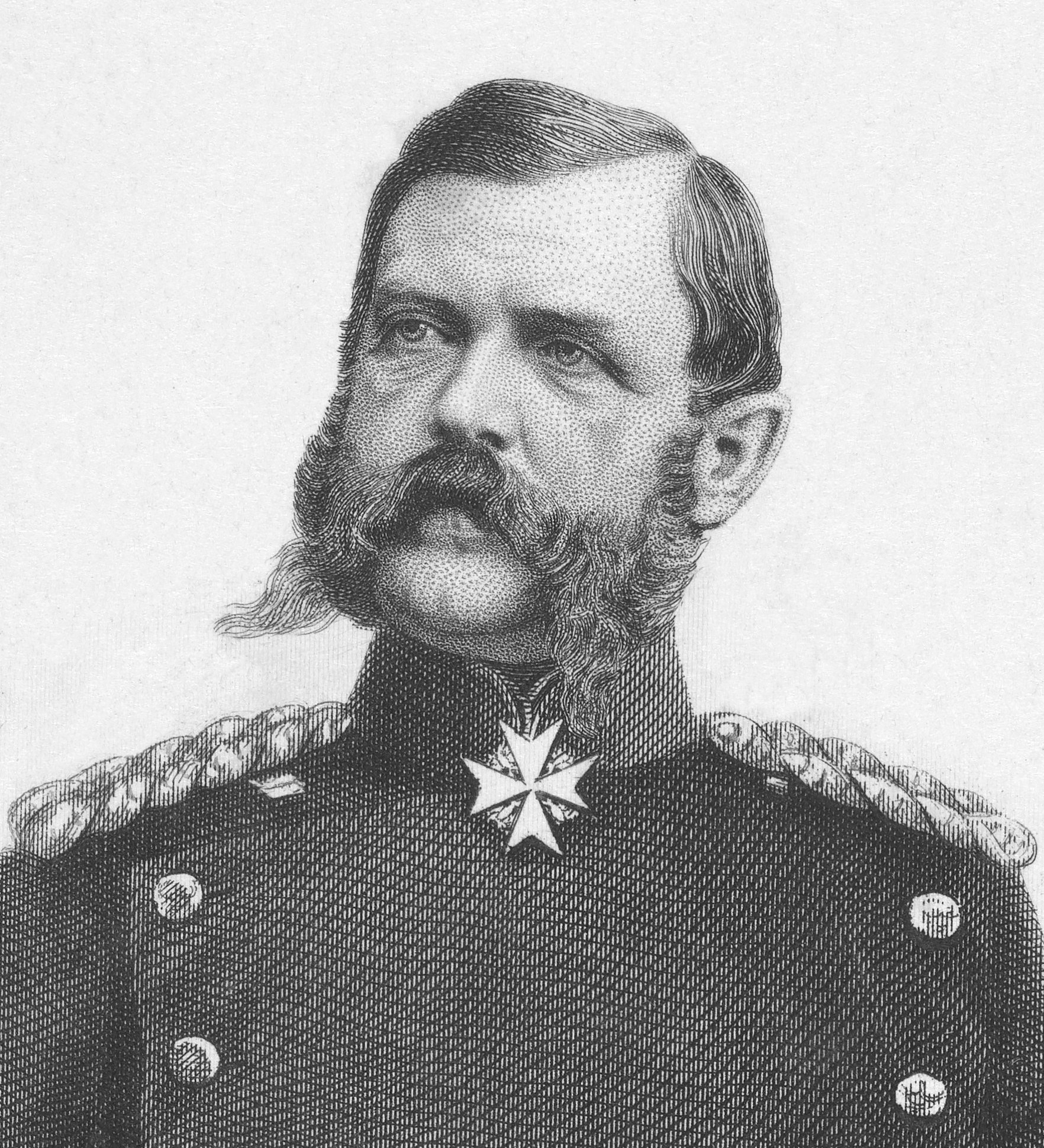
Eugen Anton Theophil von Podbielski.

Eugen Anton Theophil von Podbielski (17 October 1814 – 31 October 1879) was a general in the Prussian Army. He was born in Köpenick and originally was a cavalry officer. Podbielski served as Quartermaster-General of the German General Staff during the Austro-Prussian War and again the Franco-Prussian War. As such he was the operations officer and Deputy Chief of Staff. Afterwards he was made Inspector-General of Artillery. He also became the namesake of the 5th (1st Silesian) Field Artillery Regiment. He eventually was promoted to General of the Cavalry. Theophil von Podbielski died in Berlin. Having five daughters; his son Victor von Podbielski became a general as well and served as a Prussian minister afterwards.

== See also ==
- Podbielskiallee (Berlin U-Bahn)

Military offices
Preceded by None (Inaugural holder)	Quartermaster-General of the German Army; 1866; 18 July 1870 – 1871	Succeeded by None (Inactive)
Preceded by Gustav Eduard von Hindersin	Inspector General of the Artillery; 3 February 1872 – 31 October 1879	Succeeded by Hans von Bülow
