= Všestary (Prague-East District) =

- Municipality
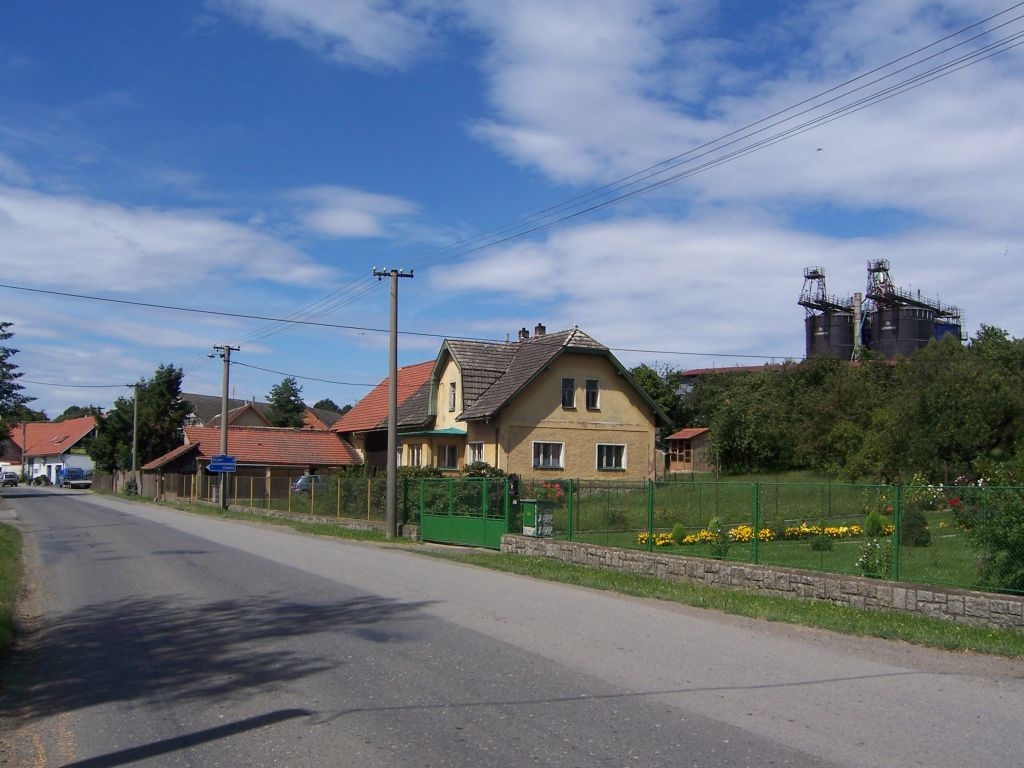
- A street in Všestary

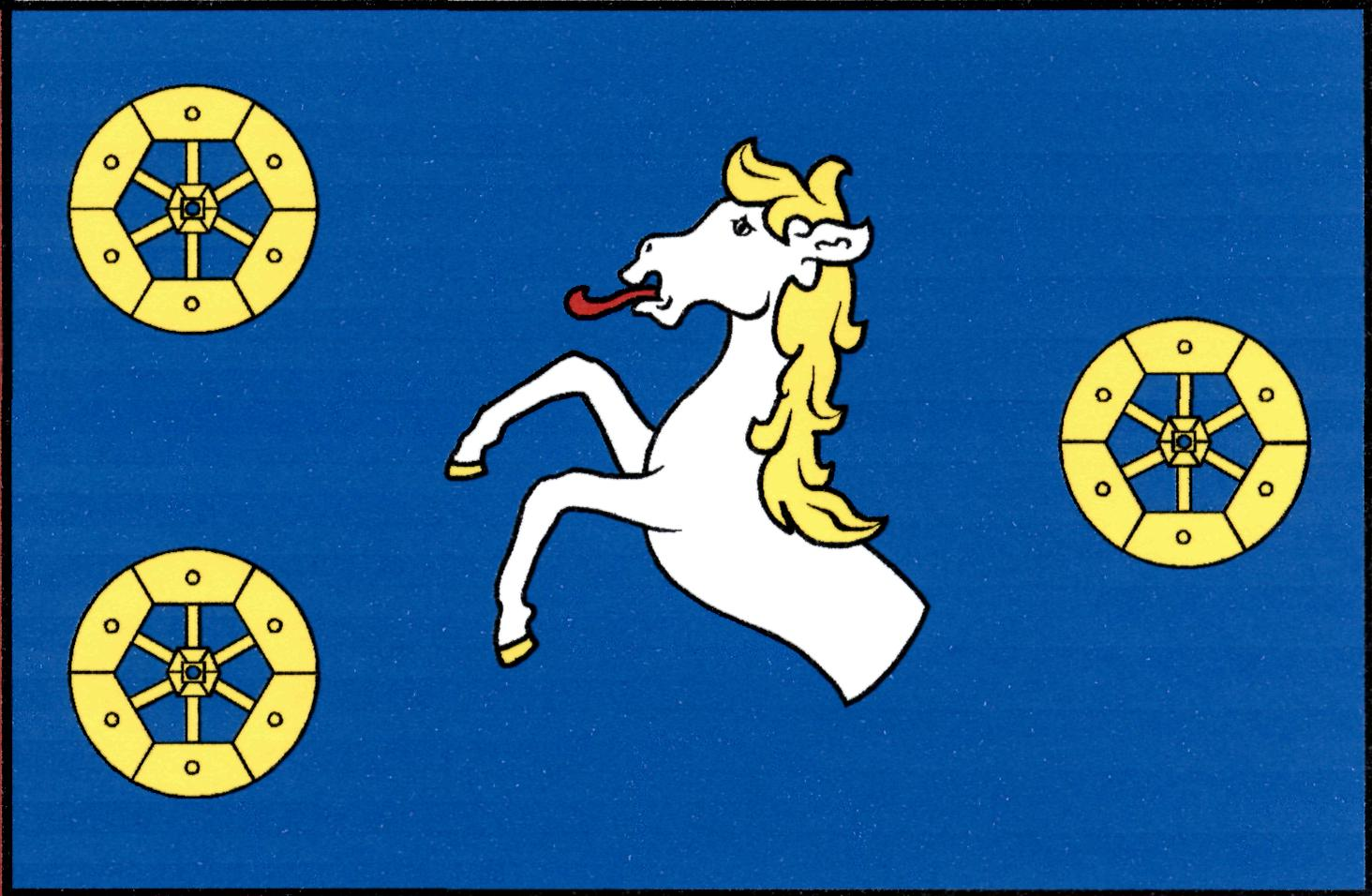
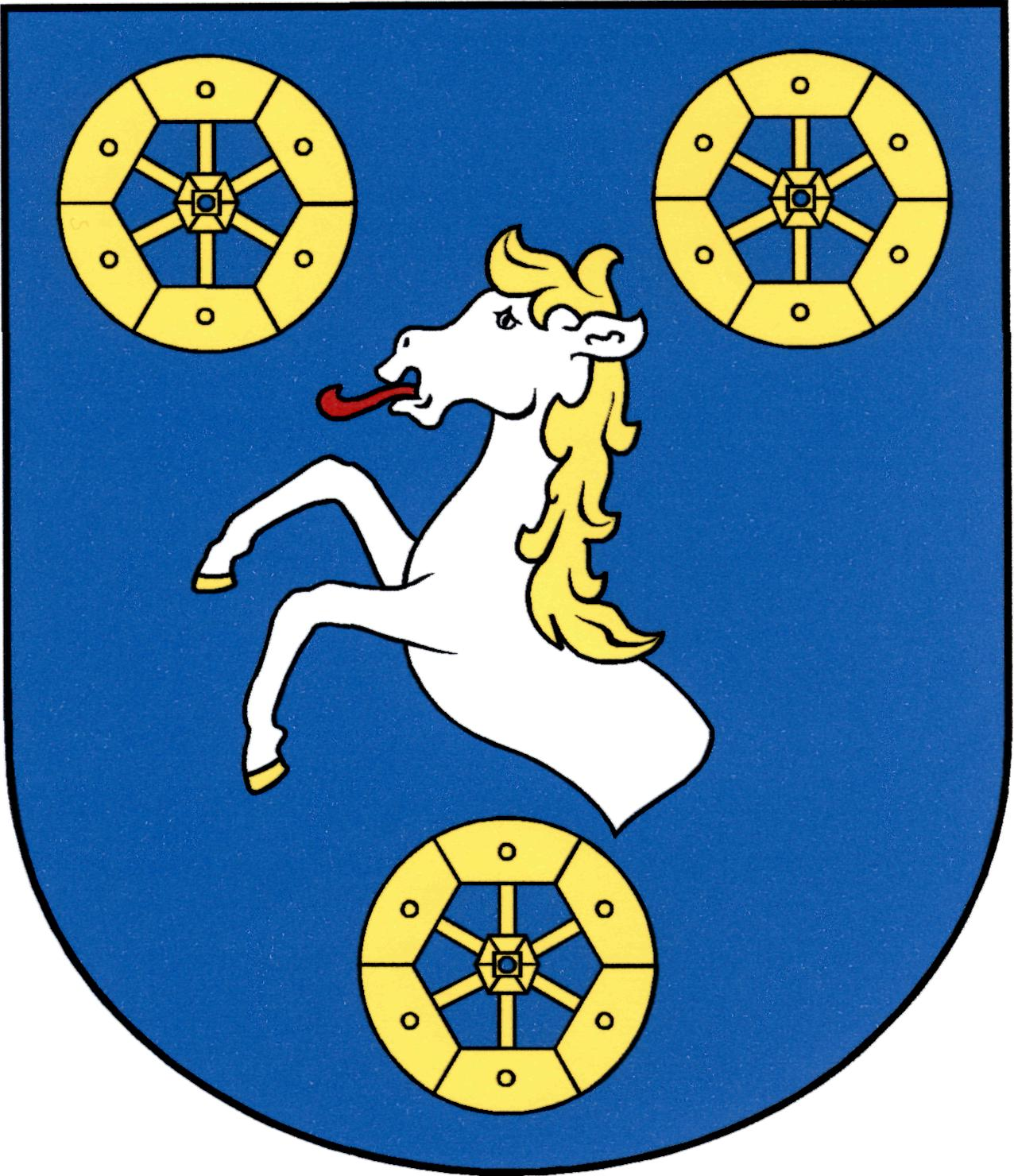
- Flag Coat of arms

- Location in the Czech Republic
- Coordinates: 49°57′31″N 14°41′7″E
- Country: Czech Republic
- Region: Central Bohemian
- District: Prague-East
- First mentioned: 1371

Area
  - Total: 4.44 km^{2} (1.71 sq mi)
- Elevation: 393 m (1,289 ft)

Population (2026-01-01)
  - Total: 1,044
  - Density: 235/km^{2} (609/sq mi)
- Time zone: UTC+1 (CET)
  - Summer (DST): UTC+2 (CEST)
- Postal code: 251 63
- Website: www.obec-vsestary.cz

Všestary (Czech pronunciation: [ˈfʃɛstarɪ]) is a municipality and village in Prague-East District in the Central Bohemian Region of the Czech Republic. It has about 1,000 inhabitants.

Všestary lies approximately 14 kilometres (9 mi) southeast of Prague.

== Administrative division ==
Všestary consists of two municipal parts (in brackets population according to the 2021 census):

- Všestary (948)
- Menčice (64)

== Demographics ==
Historical population
Year	Pop.	±%
1869	449	—
1880	477	+6.2%
1890	478	+0.2%
1900	505	+5.6%
1910	547	+8.3%
1921	511	−6.6%
1930	556	+8.8%
1950	562	+1.1%
1961	547	−2.7%
1970	509	−6.9%
1980	461	−9.4%
1991	384	−16.7%
2001	444	+15.6%
2011	785	+76.8%
2021	1,012	+28.9%
Source: Censuses
