= Karl Eberhard Herwarth von Bittenfeld =

Prussian field marshal (1796–1884)

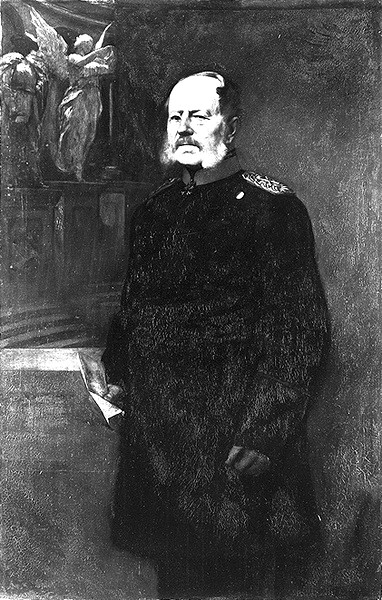
- Herwarth von Bittenfeld in 1883
- Born: September 4, 1796; Werther, Brandenburg, Prussia
- Died: September 2, 1884 (aged 87); Bonn, Rhine, Prussia, Germany
- Military career
- Allegiance: Kingdom of Prussia; North German Confederation; German Empire
- Branch: Prussian Army; Imperial German Army
- Service years: 1811–1875
- Rank: Generalfeldmarschall
- Conflicts: War of the Sixth Coalition; German revolutions of 1848–1849; Second Schleswig War; Austro-Prussian War; Franco-Prussian War

Karl Eberhard Herwarth von Bittenfeld (4 September 1796 – 2 September 1884) was a Prussian Generalfeldmarschall. He served in many military conflicts throughout the 19th century and was given major commands throughout each conflict.

== Origin ==
Eberhard came from the old Augsburg noble family Herwarth von Bittenfeld, which was established in 1246. He was the son of the Prussian Major General Eberhard Herwarth von Bittenfeld der Ältere (1753-1833) and his wife Johanna Friedericke Auguste, née von Arnstedt (1765-1851). Two of his brothers also rose to become generals in the Prussian army: Hans Paulus Herwarth von Bittenfeld (1800–1881) and Friedrich Herwarth von Bittenfeld (1802–1884). His education took place initially in his parents' home until the age of 15 when he enrolled in grammar school in Brandenburg an der Havel.

== Military career ==
Herwarth von Bittenfeld entered the infantry with the 2nd Guards Regiment in 1811, and served through the War of Liberation (1813–15) of the Napoleonic Wars, distinguishing himself at Lützen and Paris as a second lieutenant. During the years of peace he rose slowly to high command. In 1816, Bittenfeld became Premier Leutnant and in 1821, he was promoted to Hauptmann. He married Karoline Schulze in 1823 but she died in 1828. His second marriage was in 1831 with Sophie von Scholten. His second wife died in 1868. In the Berlin revolution of 1848, he was on duty at the royal palace as Colonel of the 1st Foot Guards Regiment. Bittenfeld was promoted to Major-general (German: Generalmajor) in 1852 and became the commander of the Fortress of Mainz. He was promoted to lieutenant-general (German: Generalleutnant) in 1856 and became the commander of the 7th Division. He reached the rank of General of Infantry and the command of the VII Corps in 1860.

In the Second Schleswig War in 1864, Herwarth von Bittenfeld succeeded to the command of the Prussians when Prince Friedrich Karl became commander-in-chief of the allies, and it was under his leadership that the Prussians forced the passage into Als following the victory over General Steinmann on 29 June, ending the war soon after. Bittenfeld was appointed commander of the VIII Corps that autumn. On 29 June he also received the prestigious Pour le Mérite.

In the Austro-Prussian War, Herwarth commanded the Army of the Elbe which overran Saxony and invaded Bohemia by the valley of the Elbe. His troops won the actions of Hühnerwasser and Münchengrätz, and at Königgrätz formed the right wing of the Prussian army. During the Battle of Königgrätz, Herwarth was not able to order heavy attacks against the Austrians since the artillery that Oberst von Bülow brought was too far to attack the Austrian Army. Herwarth himself directed the battle against the Austrian left flank.

Returning to command of the VIII Corps after the war, Herwarth von Bittenfeld became a member of the Reichstag of the North German Confederation from 1867 until 1870; representing the Wittlich-Bernkastel constituency as a conservative. He would continue to plan the defense of western Germany against a possible French offensive until July 1870.

In 1870, during the Franco-Prussian War, Herwarth von Bittenfeld was not employed in the field, but was in charge of the scarcely less important business of organizing and forwarding all the reserves and material required for the armies in France and later overseeing prisoner of war camps when the threat of French invasion was eliminated. In 1871 he was semi-retired and brevetted Generalfeldmarschall. The rest of his life was spent in retirement at Bonn, where he died in 1884. He was buried next to his second wife. Since 1889 the 13th (1st Westphalian) Infantry Regiment carried his name.

== Honours and awards ==
He received the following orders and decorations:

- Kingdom of Prussia:
  - Knight of Honour of the Johanniter Order, 1846; Knight of Justice, 1858; Commander
  - Knight of the Crown Order, 1st Class, 18 October 1861; with Enamel Band of the Red Eagle Order and Oak Leaves, 1865
  - Pour le Mérite (military), 29 June 1864
  - Grand Cross of the Red Eagle, with Oak Leaves and Swords, 14 November 1864
  - Service Award Cross
  - Knight of the Black Eagle, 30 July 1866; with Collar, 1867
  - Grand Commander's Cross of the Royal House Order of Hohenzollern, with Star (60 years), 5 October 1871
- Hohenzollern: Cross of Honour of the Princely House Order of Hohenzollern, 1st Class with Swords
- Ascanian duchies: Grand Cross of the Order of Albert the Bear, 8 November 1857
- Baden: Grand Cross of the Zähringer Lion, 1852
- (Saxe-Coburg and Gotha) (Duchy of Saxe-Altenburg) (Saxe-Meiningen) Ernestine duchies: Grand Cross of the Saxe-Ernestine House Order, November 1857
- Grand Duchy of Hesse: Grand Cross of the Ludwig Order, 4 July 1871
- Principality of Lippe:
  - Cross of Honour of the House Order of Lippe, 1st Class with Swords
  - Military Merit Medal
- Mecklenburg-Schwerin: Military Merit Cross, 2nd Class
- Waldeck and Pyrmont: Military Merit Cross, 1st Class
- Austrian Empire:
  - Commander of the Imperial Order of Leopold, 1854
  - Knight of the Iron Crown, 1st Class, 1863
  - Knight of the Military Order of Maria Theresa, 1864
- Netherlands: Grand Cross of the Netherlands Lion
- Ottoman Empire: Order of Osmanieh, 1st Class
- Russian Empire:
  - Knight of St. Anna, 2nd Class
  - Knight of St. Stanislaus, 2nd Class

== Bibliography ==
Prussian General Staff (1872). The Campaign of 1866 in Germany.
