= Všestary (Hradec Králové District) =

- Municipality
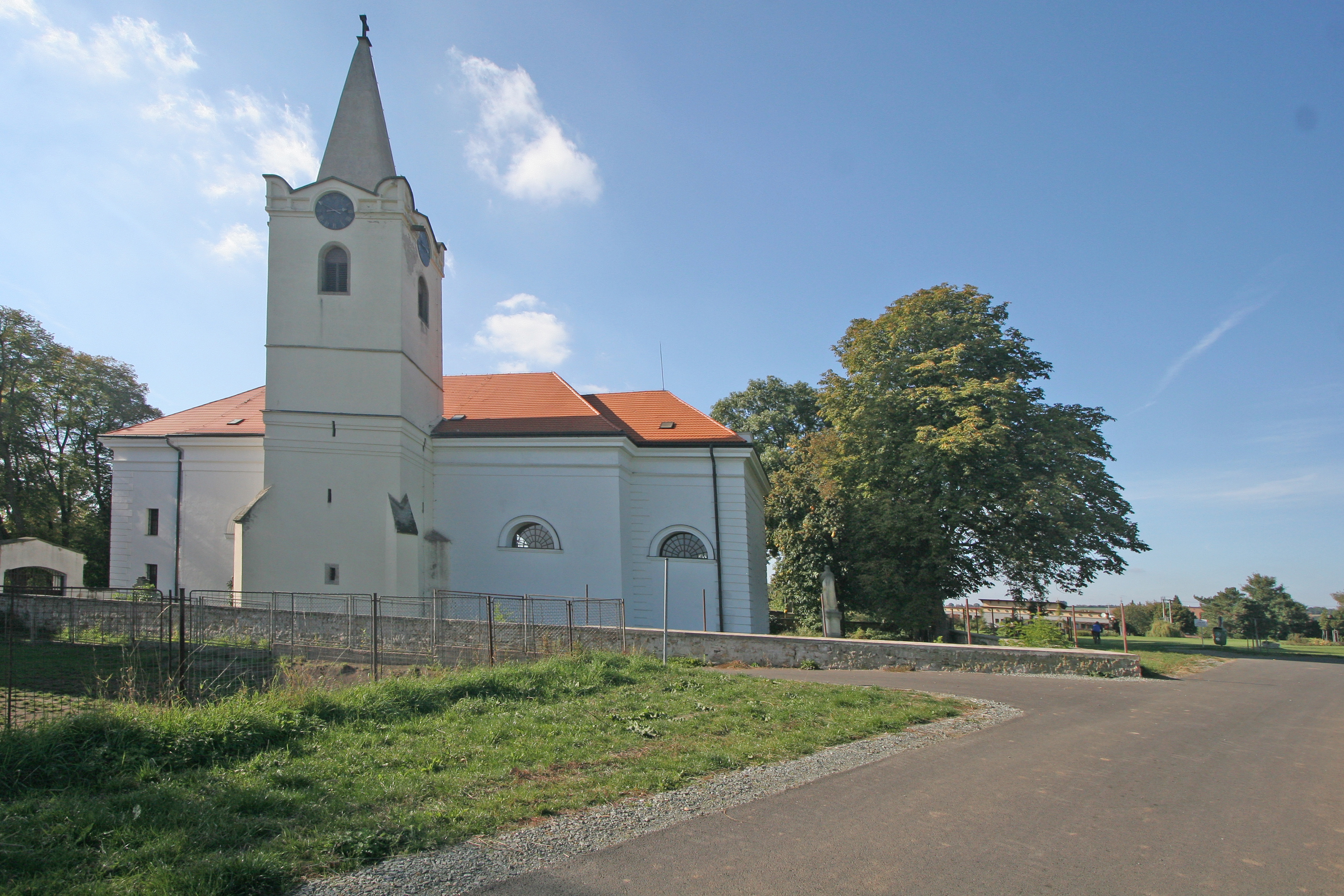
- Church of the Holy Trinity

- Flag Coat of arms

- Location in the Czech Republic
- Coordinates: 50°15′23″N 15°45′26″E
- Country: Czech Republic
- Region: Hradec Králové
- District: Hradec Králové
- First mentioned: 1360

Area
  - Total: 16.20 km^{2} (6.25 sq mi)
- Elevation: 265 m (869 ft)

Population (2026-01-01)
  - Total: 1,770
  - Density: 109/km^{2} (283/sq mi)
- Time zone: UTC+1 (CET)
  - Summer (DST): UTC+2 (CEST)
- Postal code: 503 12
- Website: www.vsestary-obec.cz

Všestary is a municipality and village in Hradec Králové District in the Hradec Králové Region of the Czech Republic. It has about 1,800 inhabitants.

== Administrative division ==
Všestary consists of six municipal parts (in brackets population according to the 2021 census):

- Všestary (663)
- Bříza (234)
- Chlum (220)
- Lípa (160)
- Rosnice (175)
- Rozběřice (240)

== Demographics ==
Historical population
| Year | Pop. | ±% |
|---|---|---|
| 1869 | 1,964 | — |
| 1880 | 2,151 | +9.5% |
| 1890 | 2,032 | −5.5% |
| 1900 | 1,999 | −1.6% |
| 1910 | 1,933 | −3.3% |
| 1921 | 2,013 | +4.1% |
| 1930 | 1,910 | −5.1% |
| 1950 | 1,501 | −21.4% |
| 1961 | 1,498 | −0.2% |
| 1970 | 1,380 | −7.9% |
| 1980 | 1,405 | +1.8% |
| 1991 | 1,394 | −0.8% |
| 2001 | 1,483 | +6.4% |
| 2011 | 1,627 | +9.7% |
| 2021 | 1,692 | +4.0% |
Source: Censuses
