= Bryan Perrett =

- Born: 9 July 1934; Liverpool
- Died: 16 June 2020 (aged 85)
- Occupations: Author, historian
- Writing career
- Period: 1970–2020
- Genre: Military history

Signature
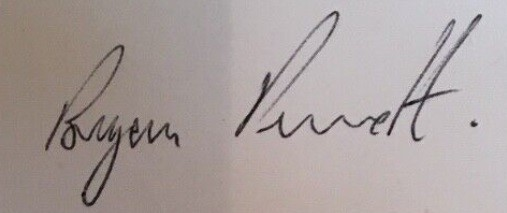

Bryan Perrett (9 July 1934 – 16 June 2020) was a military historian and author. He served in the Royal Tank Regiment.

== Biography ==
Bryan Perrett was born on 9 July 1934 to parents Thomas Edgar Perrett and Ellen Perrett (nee Nicholson). He married Anne Catherine Trench in 1966. He served in the British army from 1952 to 1954, the Territorial Army until 1967 and then in the Royal Tank Regiment (as part of the Army Emergency Reserve) until 1971, leaving service in the rank of captain. After working in insurance until 1977 he became a full time author until his death. As well as writing numerous books on military history, he was the defence correspondent for the Liverpool Echo during the Falklands War and Gulf War. The majority of his works were on the subject of armoured warfare. He died on 16 June 2020, survived by his wife Anne.

== Works ==
- Fighting Vehicles of the Red Army (1969)
- NATO Armour (1971)
- The Valentine in North Africa, 1942–1943 (1972)
- The Matilda (1973)
- The Churchill (1974)
- Through Mud and Blood: Infantry/Tank Operations in World War II, foreword by Field Marshal Sir Michael Carver (1975)
- The Lee/Grant Tanks in British Service (1978)
- Tank Tracks to Rangoon: The Story of British Armour in Burma (1978)
- Allied Tank Destroyers (1979)
- Wavell's Offensive (1979)
- Sturmartillerie and Panzerjager (1979)
- The Churchill Tank (1980)
- The Panzerkampfwagen III (1980)
- The Stuart Light Tank Series (1980)
- The Panzerkampfwagen IV (1980)
- The Tiger Tanks (1981)
- The Panzerkampfwagen V Panther (1981)
- British Tanks in North Africa 1940–42 (1981)
- The Czar's British Squadron foreword by Prince Philip, Duke of Edinburgh (1981)
- German Armoured Cars and Reconnaissance Half-Tracks 1939–45 (1982)
- Weapons of the Falklands Conflict (1982)
- German Light Panzers (1983)
- A History of Blitzkrieg foreword by General Sir John Hackett (1983)
- Mechanised Infantry (1984)
- The Hawks: A Short History of the 14th/20th King's Hussars (1984)
- Allied Armour in Italy 1943/45 (1985)
- Allied Armour in North Africa 1942–43 (1986)
- A Hawk at War: The Peninsular Reminiscences of General Sir Thomas Brotherton (1986)
- Knights of the Black Cross: Hitler's Panzerwaffe and Its Leaders foreword by General Fridolin von Senger und Etterlin (1986)
- Hitler's Panzers: The Years of Aggression (1987)
- Soviet Armour since 1945 (1987)
- Desert Warfare: From Its Roman Origins to the Gulf Conflict foreword by foreword by Field Marshal Lord Michael Carver (1988)
- Tank Warfare (1990)
- Liverpool: A City at War (1990)
- Last Stand: Famous Battles Against The Odds
- Against All Odds!
- The Hunters and the Hunted: The Elimination of German Surface Warships around the World 1914–15
- Heroes of the Hour: Brief Moments of Military Glory
- Why the Japanese Lost: The Red Sun's Setting
- Iron Fist: Classic Armoured Warfare: Classic Armoured Warfare Case Studies
- Gunboat!: Small Ships at War
- Why the Germans Lost: The Rise and Fall of the Black Eagle
- For Valour
- My Story: D-Day
- North Sea Battleground: The War and Sea, 1914–1918
- The Battle Book: Crucial Conflicts in History from 1469 BC to the Present
- Allied Tanks, North Africa, World War II (1986)
- The Real Hornblower: The Life of Rear Admiral Sir James Gordon GCB Annapolis (1997)
- British Military History For Dummies
