= First Battle of the Marne order of battle =

The following units of the British, French and German Empires fought in the First Battle of the Marne from 5–12 September 1914 on the Western Front of World War I.

== Comparative relevant military ranks ==
British Army	French Army	German Army
Captain	Capitaine	Hauptmann / Rittmeister
Major	Commandant	Major
Lieutenant-Colonel	Lieutenant-Colonel	Oberstleutnant
Colonel	Colonel	Oberst
Brigadier-General	Général de Brigade	Generalmajor
Major-General	Général de Division	Generalleutnant
Lieutenant-General	Général de Corps d’Armée	General der Infanterie / der Kavallerie / der Artillerie
General	Général d’Armée	Generaloberst
Field Marshal	Maréchal de France	Feldmarschall

== British Expeditionary Force ==
Commander-in-Chief of the BEF: Field-Marshal Sir John French

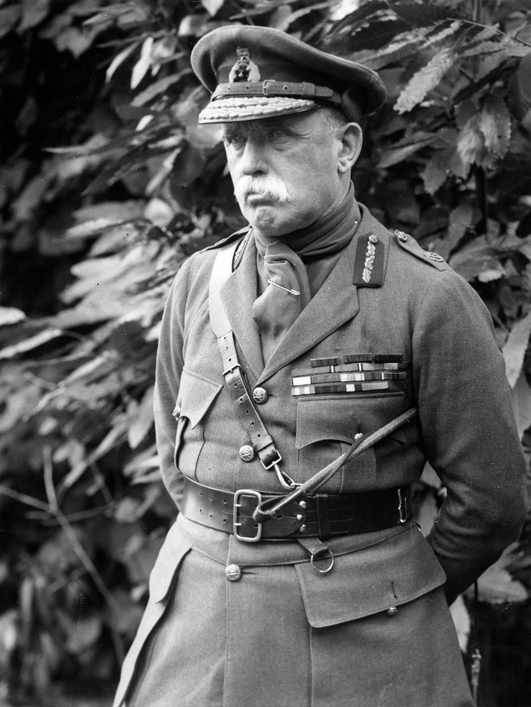
John French

Chief of Staff: Lieutenant-General Sir Archibald Murray
Deputy Chief of Staff: Major-General Sir Henry Wilson
Adjutant-General: Major-General Sir Nevil Macready
Quartermaster-General: Major-General Sir William Robertson
Deputy Adjutant-General: Major-General E. R. C. Graham
Commander, Royal Artillery: Major-General W. F. L. Lindsay
Commander, Royal Engineers: Brigadier-General G. H. Fowke
Assistant Adjutant-General: Colonel A. E. J. Cavendish
Assistant Quartermaster-General: Colonel C. T. Dawkins
Operations Officer: Colonel G. M. Harper
Intelligence Officer: Colonel G. M. W. Macdonogh

=== I Corps ===
Lieutenant-General Sir Douglas Haig (Note: Replaced French as C-in-C BEF December 1915)

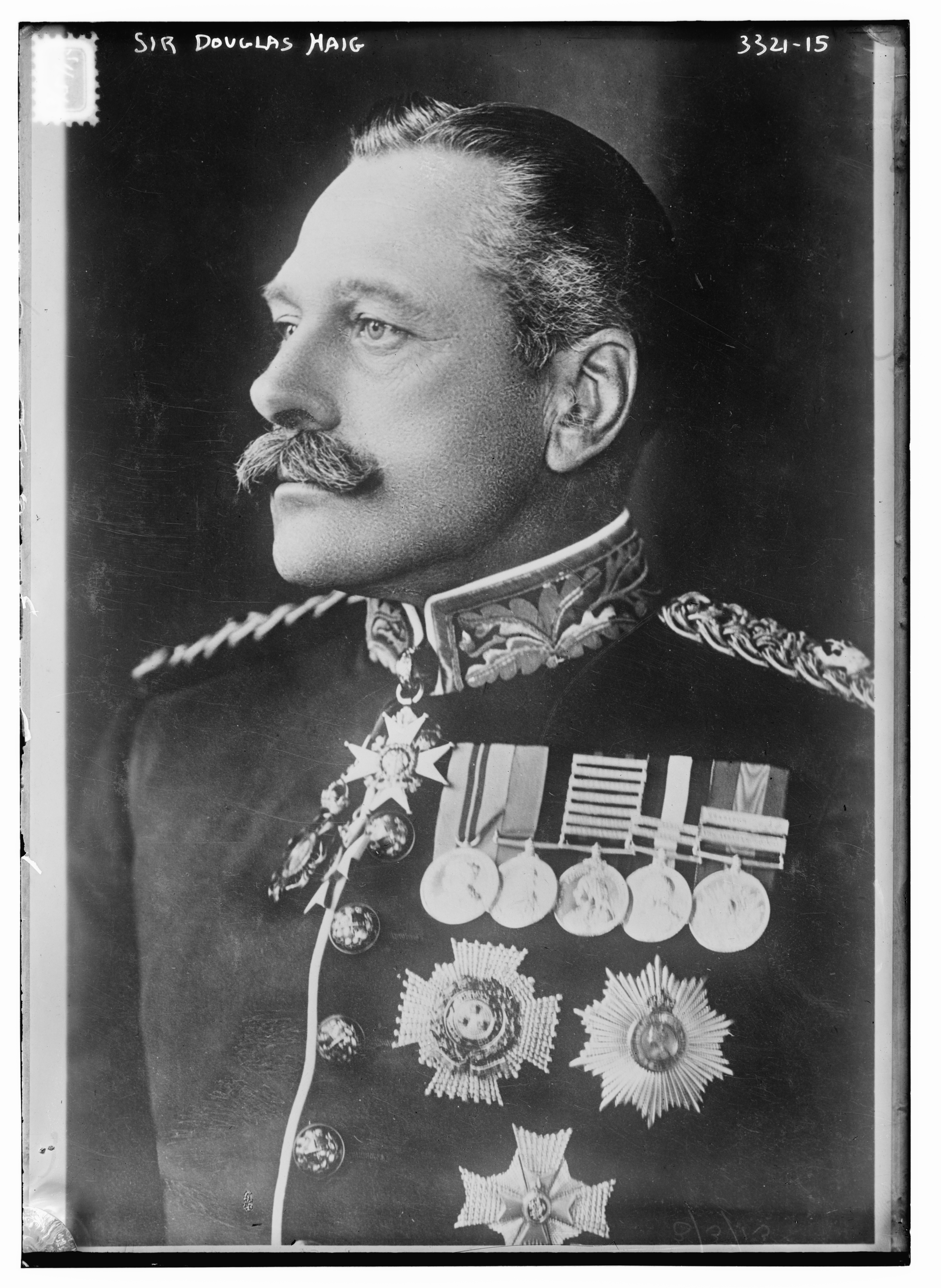
Douglas Haig

Chief of Staff: Brigadier-General J. E. Gough
Commander, Royal Artillery: Brigadier-General H. S. Horne
Commander, Royal Engineers: Brigadier-General S. R. Rice

1st Division
Major-General S. H. Lomax

1st (Guards) Brigade (Brigadier-General F. I. Maxse)

1st Coldstream Guards
1st Scots Guards
1st The Black Watch (Royal Highlanders)
2nd The Royal Munster Fusiliers

2nd Infantry Brigade (Brigadier-General E. S. Bulfin)

2nd The Royal Sussex Regiment
1st The Loyal North Lancashire Regiment
1st The Northamptonshire Regiment
2nd The King's Royal Rifle Corps

3rd Infantry Brigade (Brigadier-General H. J. S. Landon)

1st The Queen's (Royal West Surrey Regiment)
1st The South Wales Borderers
1st The Gloucestershire Regiment
2nd The Welch Regiment

Artillery (Brigadier-General N. D. Findlay)

XXV Brigade RFA
XXVI Brigade RFA
XXXIX Brigade RFA
XLIII (Howitzer) Brigade RFA
26th Heavy Battery, RGA

A Squadron, 15th (The King's) Hussars
23rd Field Company, RE
26th Field Company, RE

2nd Division
Major-General C. C. Monro

4th (Guards) Brigade (Brigadier-General Robert Scott-Kerr)

2nd Grenadier Guards
2nd Coldstream Guards
3rd Coldstream Guards
1st Irish Guards

5th Infantry Brigade (Brigadier-General Richard Haking)

2nd The Worcestershire Regiment
2nd The Oxfordshire and Buckinghamshire Light Infantry
2nd The Highland Light Infantry
2nd The Connaught Rangers

6th Infantry Brigade (Brigadier-General R. H. Davies)

1st The King's (Liverpool Regiment)
2nd The South Staffordshire Regiment
1st Princess Charlotte of Wales's (Royal Berkshire Regiment)
1st The King's Royal Rifle Corps

Artillery (Brigadier-General E. M. Perceval)

XXXIV Brigade RFA
XXXVI Brigade RFA
XLI Brigade RFA
XLIV (Howitzer) Brigade RFA
35th Heavy Battery, RGA

B Squadron, 15th (The King's) Hussars
5th Field Company, RE
11th Field Company, RE

=== II Corps ===
Lieutenant-General Sir Horace Smith-Dorrien (Note: Strongly clashed with Sir John French on matters of strategy)

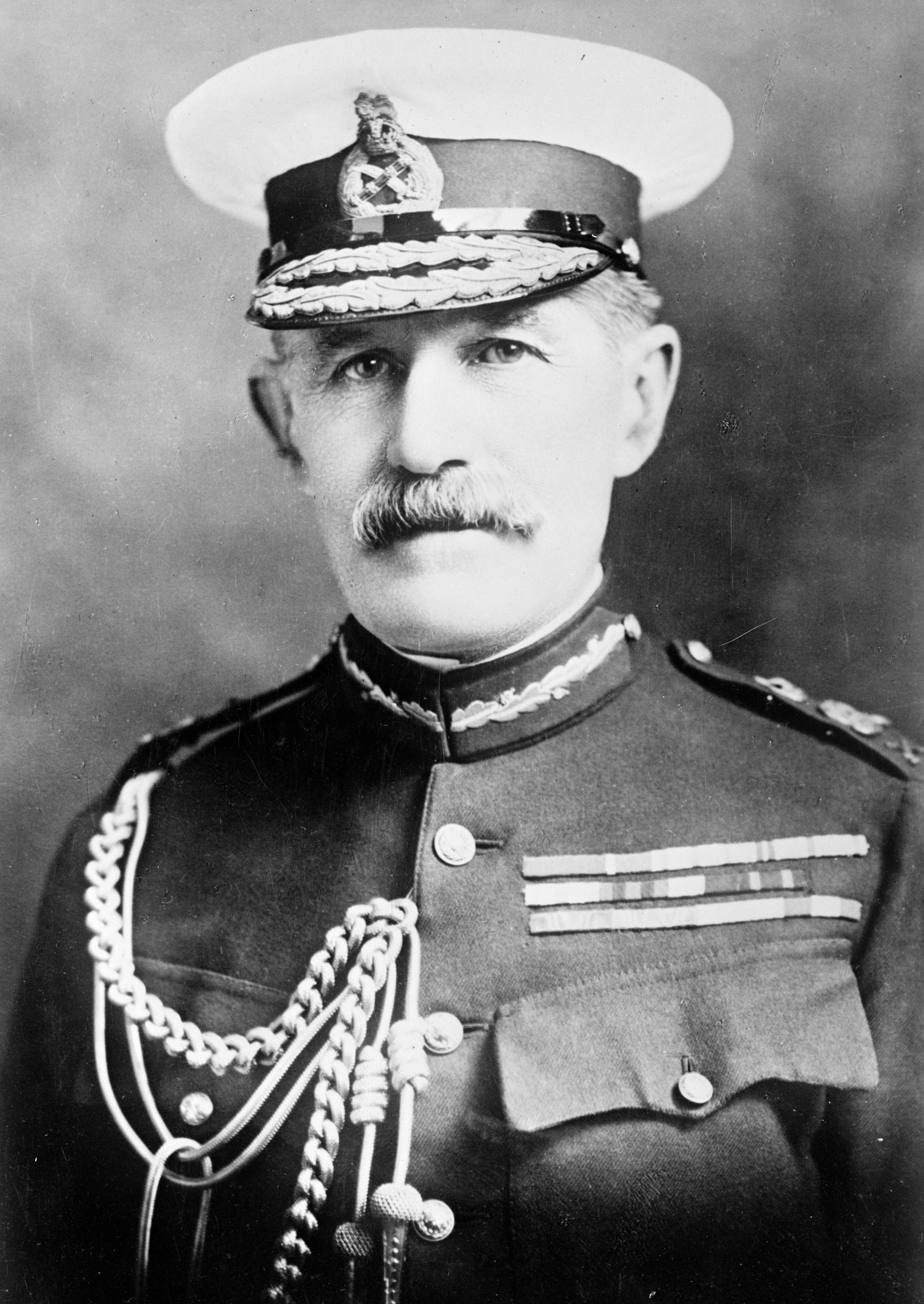
Horace Smith-Dorrien

Chief of Staff: Brigadier-General George Forestier-Walker
Commander, Royal Artillery: Brigadier-General A. H. Short
Commander, Royal Engineers: Brigadier-General A. E. Sandbach

3rd Division
Major-General Hubert I. W. Hamilton

7th Infantry Brigade (Brigadier-General F. W. N. McCracken)

3rd The Worcestershire Regiment
2nd The Prince of Wales's Volunteers (South Lancashire Regiment)
1st The Duke of Edinburgh's (Wiltshire Regiment)
2nd The Royal Irish Rifles

8th Infantry Brigade (Brigadier-General B. J. C. Doran)

2nd The Royal Scots (Lothian Regiment)
2nd The Royal Irish Regiment
4th The Duke of Cambridge's Own (Middlesex Regiment)
1st The Gordon Highlanders

9th Infantry Brigade (Brigadier-General F. C. Shaw)

1st The Northumberland Fusiliers
4th The Royal Fusiliers (City of London Regiment)
1st The Lincolnshire Regiment
1st The Royal Scots Fusiliers

Artillery (Brigadier-General F. D. V. Wing)

XXIII Brigade RFA
XL Brigade RFA
XLII Brigade RFA
XXX (Howitzer) Brigade RFA
48th Heavy Battery, RGA

C Squadron, 15th (The King's) Hussars
56th Field Company, RE
57th Field Company, RE

5th Division
Major-General Sir Charles Fergusson

13th Infantry Brigade (Brigadier-General G. J. Cuthbert)

2nd The King's Own Scottish Borderers
2nd The Duke of Wellington's (West Riding Regiment)
1st The Queen's Own (Royal West Kent Regiment)
2nd The King's Own (Yorkshire Light Infantry)

14th Infantry Brigade (Brigadier-General S. P. Rolt)

2nd The Suffolk Regiment
1st The East Surrey Regiment
1st The Duke of Cornwall's Light Infantry
2nd The Manchester Regiment

15th Infantry Brigade (Brigadier-General A. E. W. Count Gleichen)

1st The Norfolk Regiment
1st The Bedfordshire Regiment
1st The Cheshire Regiment
1st The Dorsetshire Regiment

Artillery (Brigadier-General J. E. W. Headlam)

XV Brigade RFA
XXVII Brigade RFA
XXVIII Brigade RFA
VIII (Howitzer) Brigade RFA
108th Heavy Battery, RGA

A Squadron, 19th (Queen Alexandra's Own Royal) Hussars
17th Field Company, RE
59th Field Company, RE

=== III Corps ===
Major-General W. P. Pulteney

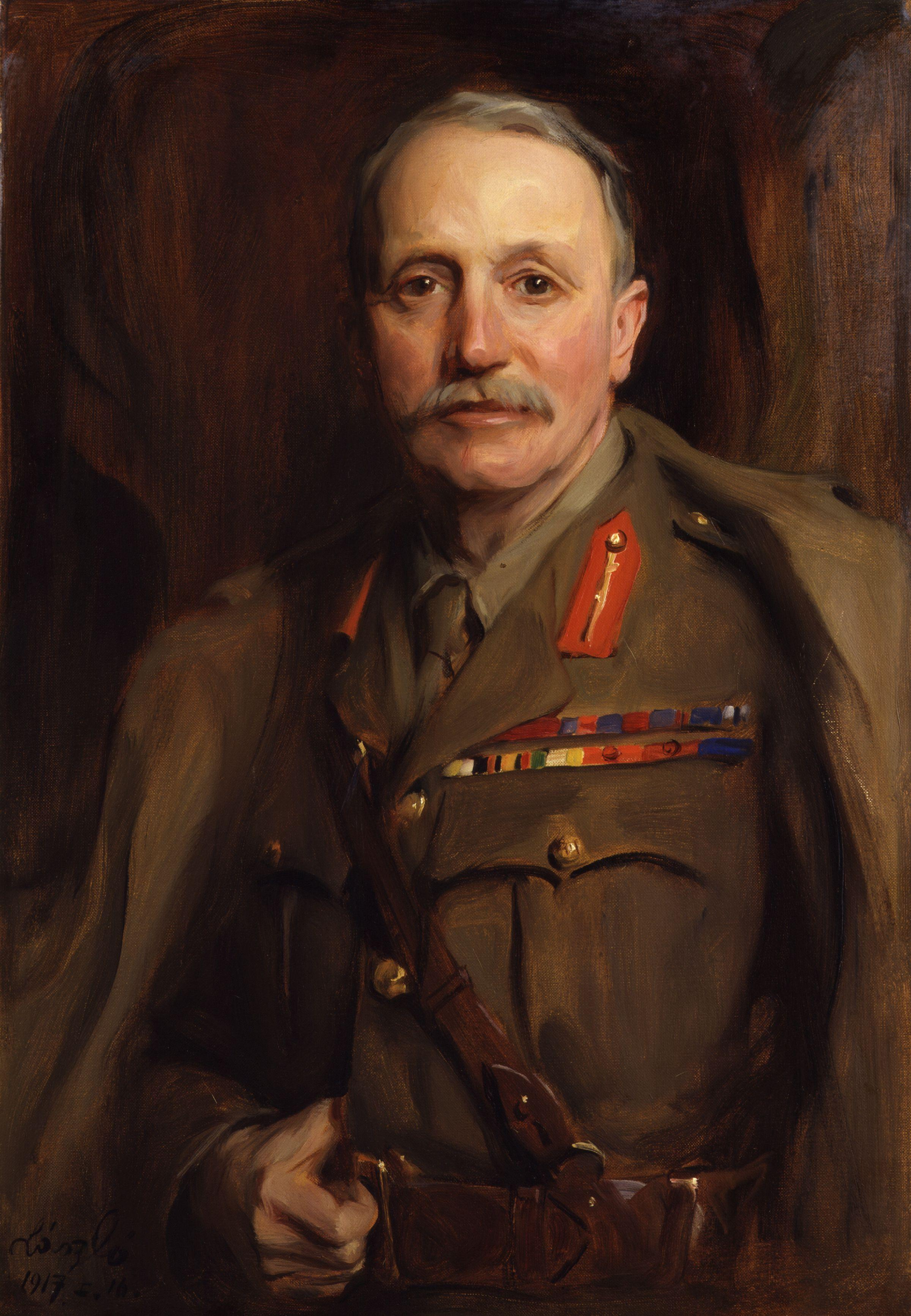
William Pulteney

Chief of Staff: Brigadier-General J. P. Du Cane
Commander, Royal Artillery: Brigadier-General E. J. Phipps-Hornby
Commander, Royal Engineers: Brigadier-General F. M. Glubb

4th Division
Major-General T. D'O. Snow

10th Infantry Brigade (Brigadier-General J. A. L. Haldane)

1st The Royal Warwickshire Regiment
2nd Seaforth Highlanders (Ross-shire Buffs, The Duke of Albany's)
1st Princess Victoria's (Royal Irish Fusiliers)
2nd The Royal Dublin Fusiliers

11th Infantry Brigade (Brigadier-General A. G. Hunter-Weston)

1st Prince Albert's (Somerset Light Infantry)
1st The East Lancashire Regiment
1st The Hampshire Regiment
1st The Rifle Brigade (Prince Consort's Own)

12th Infantry Brigade (Brigadier-General H. F. M. Wilson)

1st King's Own (Royal Lancaster Regiment)
2nd The Lancashire Fusiliers
2nd The Royal Inniskilling Fusiliers
2nd The Essex Regiment

Artillery (Brigadier-General G. F. Milne)

XIV Brigade RFA
XXIX Brigade RFA
XXXII Brigade RFA
XXXVII (Howitzer) Brigade RFA
31st Heavy Battery, RGA

B Squadron, 19th (Queen Alexandra's Own Royal) Hussars
7th Field Company, RE
9th Field Company, RE

19th Infantry Brigade (Major-General L. G. Drummond)

2nd The Royal Welch Fusiliers
1st The Cameronians (Scottish Rifles)
1st The Duke of Cambridge's Own (Middlesex Regiment)
2nd Princess Louise's (Argyll and Sutherland Highlanders)

=== 1st Cavalry Division ===
Major-General Edmund Allenby (Note: Given command of British forces in the Middle East in June 1917; entered Jerusalem in December)

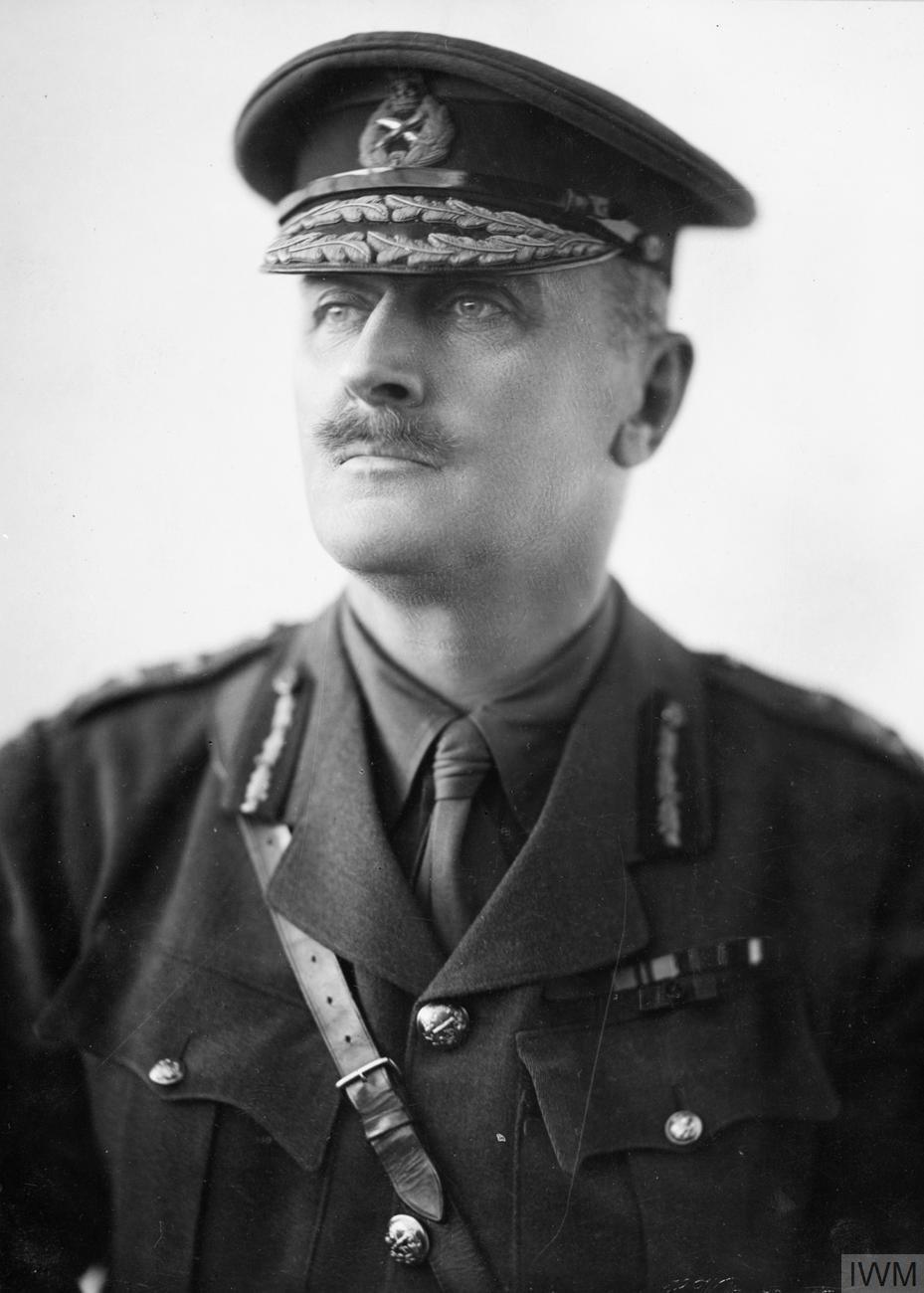
Edmund Allenby

1st Cavalry Brigade (Brigadier-General C. J. Briggs)

2nd Dragoon Guards (Queen's Bays)
5th (Princess Charlotte of Wales's) Dragoon Guards
11th (Prince Albert's Own) Hussars

2nd Cavalry Brigade (Brigadier-General H. de Lisle)

4th (Royal Irish) Dragoon Guards
9th (Queen's Royal) Lancers
18th (Queen Mary's Own) Hussars

3rd Cavalry Brigade (Brigadier-General Hubert Gough)

4th (Queen's Own) Hussars
5th (Royal Irish) Lancers
16th (The Queen's) Lancers

4th Cavalry Brigade (Brigadier-General Hon. C. E. Bingham)

Household Cavalry Composite Regiment
6th Dragoon Guards (Carabiners)
3rd (King's Own) Hussars

Horse Artillery (Brigadier-General B. F. Drake)

III Brigade, Royal Horse Artillery
VII Brigade, Royal Horse Artillery

1st Field Squadron, RE

=== Army Troops ===
1st The Queen's Own Cameron Highlanders
1st The Devonshire Regiment
A Squadron, North Irish Horse
B Squadron, North Irish Horse
B Squadron, South Irish Horse
5th Cavalry Brigade (Brigadier-General Sir Philip Chetwode)

2nd Dragoons (Royal Scots Greys)
12th (Prince of Wales's Royal) Lancers
20th Hussars
J Battery, RHA
4th Field Squadron, RE

Royal Garrison Artillery

No. 1 Siege Battery
No. 2 Siege Battery
No. 3 Siege Battery
No. 4 Siege Battery
No. 5 Siege Battery
No. 6 Siege Battery

Royal Flying Corps (Brigadier-General Sir David Henderson)

2nd Aeroplane Squadron (Major C. J. Burke)
3rd Aeroplane Squadron (Major John Salmond)
4th Aeroplane Squadron (Major G. H. Rayleig)
5th Aeroplane Squadron
6th Aeroplane Squadron (Major John Becke)

== French Armies ==
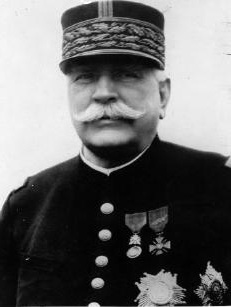
Joseph Joffre

Général d’Armée Joseph Joffre

=== Fifth Army ===
Général d’Armée Louis Franchet d'Espèrey

I Corps
Général de Corps d’Armée Henry Victor Deligny

1st Infantry Division (Général de Division Marie Alexandre Gallet)
2nd Infantry Division (Général de Division Henry Victor Deligny thru 8 Sep, then Colonel Noël Garnier-Duplessix)

III Corps
Général de Corps d’Armée Emile H. Hache

5th Infantry Division (Général de Brigade Charles Mangin)
6th Infantry Division (Général de Brigade Philippe Pétain (Note: Headed the collaborationist Vichy regime, 1940-1944))
37th Infantry Division (Général de Division Louis Comby)

X Corps
Général de Corps d’Armée Gilbert Defforges

19th Infantry Division (Général de Division Henry Bailly)
20th Infantry Division (Général de Division Martial Adolphe Rogerie)
51st Reserve Division (Général de Division René Boutegourd)

French 5th Army at the Battle of the Marne 28-29 August 1914

XVIII Corps
Général de Corps d’Armée Louis de Maud'huy

35th Infantry Division (Général Francois Marjoulet)
36th Infantry Division (Général Théophile Jouannic)
38th Infantry Division (Général de Division Paul Muteau)

IV Reserve Division Group
Général de Division Mardochée Valabrègue

53rd Infantry Division (Général de Division Georges Perruchon, Général Journée)
69th Infantry Division (Général de Division Henri Le Gros)

Conneau Cavalry Corps
Général de Corps d’Armée Louis Conneau

4th Cavalry Division (General Pierre Abonneau)
8th Cavalry Division (Général de Brigade Albert Baratier)
10th Cavalry Division (Général de Brigade Camille Barthélémy Grellet)

=== Sixth Army ===
Général d’Armée Joseph Maunoury
Military Governor of Paris: Général d’Armée Joseph Gallieni
Chief of Staff: Général Guillemin

IV Corps
Général de Corps d’Armée Victor R. Boelle

7th Infantry Division (Général de Division Edgard de Trentinian)
8th Infantry Division (Général de Division Raoul de Lartigue)

VII Corps
Général de Corps d’Armée Frederic E. Vautier

14th Infantry Division (Général de Division Étienne de Villaret)
63rd Reserve Division (Général de Division Georges Gustave Lombard)

V Reserve Division Group
Général de Division Henri J.A.B. de Lamaze

55th Reserve Division (Général Loius Leguay)
56th Reserve Division (Général de Brigade Théodore de Dartein)

VI Reserve Division Group

61st Reserve Division (Généra Céleste Deprez)
62nd Reserve Division (Général Marie F. Ganeval)

Cavalry Corps Sordet/Bridoux
Général de Corps d’Armée André Sordet (thru 8 Sep)
Général de Corps d’Armée Marie E. Bridoux

1st Cavalry Division
3rd Cavalry Division
5th Cavalry Division

45th Infantry Division
Général Antoine M.B. Drude

=== Ninth Army ===
Général d’Armée Ferdinand Foch (Note: Promoted to Commander-in-Chief of the Allied Armies, March 1918)
Chief of Staff: Lieutenant-Colonel Weygand

IX Corps
Général de Corps d’Armée Pierre Joseph Dubois

17th Infantry Division (Général de Division Noël Jean-Baptiste Dumas)
18th Infantry Division (Général Justinien Lefèvre)
Moroccan Division (Général de Division Georges Louis Humbert)
52nd Reserve Division (Général de Division Hyacinthe C.J. Coquet, Général de Brigade Jules A.W.L. Battesti (assumed command on September 6)

XI Corps
Général de Corps d’Armée Joseph-Paul Eydoux

21st Infantry Division (Général de Division Rene Radiguet)
22nd Infantry Division (Général de Division Joseph Maurice Pambet)
60th Reserve Division (Général de Division Maurice Joppé)

XXI Corps
Général de Corps d’Armée Émile E. Legrand-Girarde

13th Infantry Division (Général de Brigade Louis H.A. Baquet)
43rd Infantry Division (Général de Division Pierre E. Lanquetot)

9th Cavalry Division
Général Jean de l'Espée

42nd Infantry Division
Général Paul François Grossetti

== German Armies ==
Helmuth von Moltke

Chief of the Imperial German General Staff: Generaloberst Helmuth von Moltke

Quartermaster-General / Deputy Chief of Staff: General der Artillerie Hermann von Stein
Operations Officer: Oberst Gerhard Tappen
Political Officer: Oberst Wilhelm von Dommes
Intelligence Officer: Oberstleutnant Richard Hentsch

=== First Army ===
Generaloberst Alexander von Kluck
Chief of Staff: Generalmajor Hermann von Kuhl
Quartermaster-General: Oberst Walter von Bergmann

II Corps
General der Infantrie Alexander von Linsingen
Chief of Staff: Oberst Hans Freiherr von Hammerstein-Gesmold

3rd Infantry Division (Generalleutnant Ferdinand K. von Trossel)
4th Infantry Division (Generalleutnant Günther von Pannewitz)

III Corps
General der Infanterie Ewald von Lochow
Chief of Staff: Oberstleutnant Hans von Seeckt

5th Infantry Division (Generalleutnant Georg Wichura)
6th Infantry Division (Generalmajor Richard Herhudt von Rohden)

IV Corps
General der Infanterie Friedrich Sixt von Armin
Chief of Staff: Leo von Stocken

7th Infantry Division (Generalleutnant Johannes Riedel)
8th Infantry Division (Generalleutnant Georg K.A. Hildebrandt)

IX Corps
General der Infanterie Ferdinand von Quast
Chief of Staff: Oberstleutnant Franz Sydow

17th Infantry Division (Generalleutnant Arnold von Bauer)
18th Infantry Division (Generalleutnant Max von Kluge)

IV Reserve Corps
General der Artillerie Hans von Gronau
Chief of Staff: Oberstleutnant Friedrich von der Heyde

7th Reserve Division (Generalleutnant Bogislav Graf von Schwerin)
22nd Reserve Division (Generalleutnant Otto Riemann)

II Cavalry Corps
General der Kavallerie Georg von der Marwitz

2nd Cavalry Division (Generalleutnant Friedrich Freiherr von Krane)
4th Cavalry Division (Generalleutnant Otto von Garnier)
9th Cavalry Division (Generalmajor Eberhard Graf von Schmettow)

=== Second Army ===
Generaloberst Karl von Bülow
Chief of Staff: Generalleutnant Ernst Otto von Lauenstein

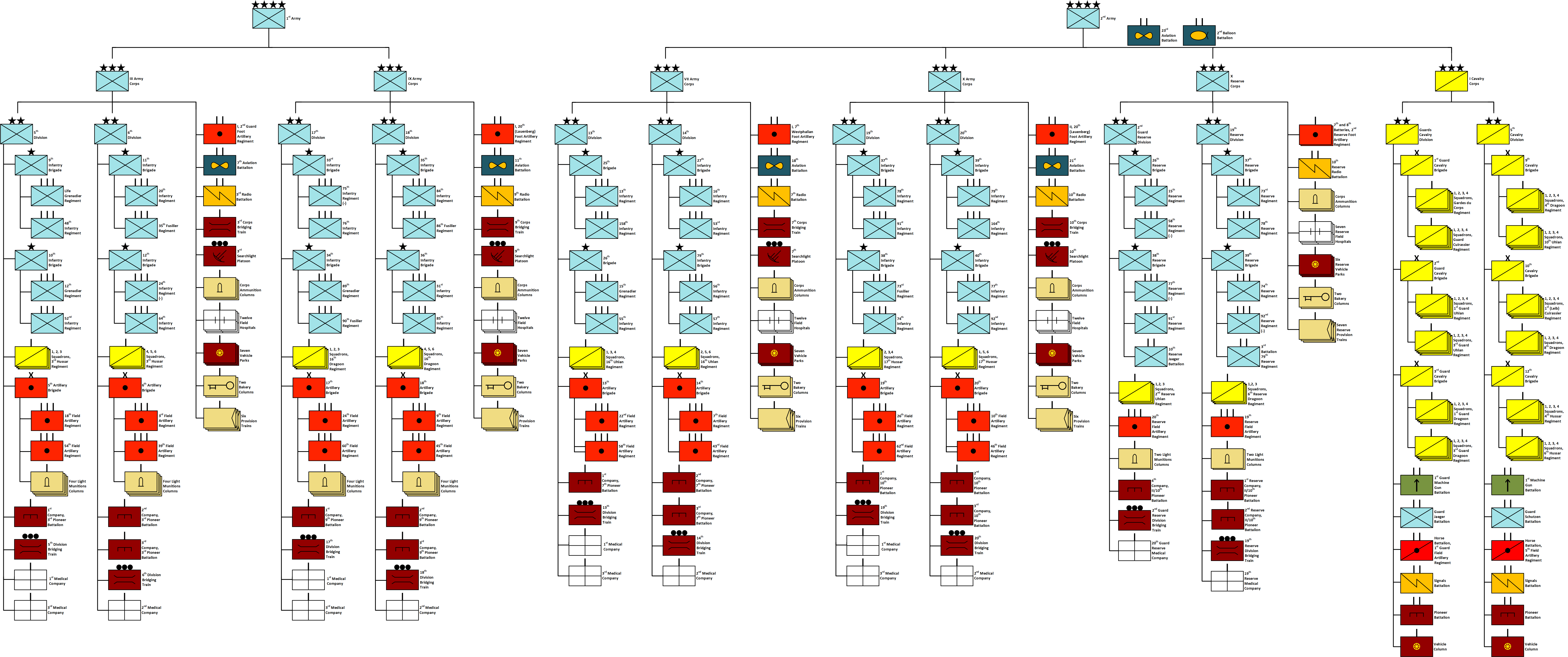
German Army at the Marne 28-29 August 1914

Guards Corps
General der Infanterie Karl von Plettenberg
Chief of Staff: Oberstleutnant Friedrich Graf von der Schulenburg

1st Guards Infantry Division (Generalleutnant Oskar von Hutier)
2nd Guards Infantry Division (Generalleutnant Arnold von Winckler)

VII Corps
General der Kavallerie Karl von Einem
Chief of Staff: Oberst Hans von Wolff

13th Infantry Division (Generalleutnant Kurt von dem Borne)
14th Infantry Division (Generalleutnant Friedrich Fleck)

X Corps
General der Infanterie Otto von Emmich
Chief of Staff: Oberst Gustav Freiherr von der Wenge Graf von Lambsdorff

19th Infantry Division (Generalleutnant Max P.O. Hofmann)
20th Infantry Division (Generalleutnant Alwin Schmundt)

X Reserve Corps
General der Infanterie Johannes von Eben
Chief of Staff: Oberstleutnant Max Hoffmann von Waldau

2nd Guards Reserve Division (Generalleutnant Richard Freiherr von Süsskind-Schwendi)
19th Reserve Division (General der Infanterie Max von Bahrfeldt)

I Cavalry Corps
Generalleutnant Manfred von Richthofen (Note: Great-uncle of Manfred von Richthofen, known as the Red Baron)

Guards Cavalry Division (Generalleutnant Adolph von Storch)
5th Cavalry Division (Generalleutnant Karl von Ilsemann)

=== Third Army ===
Generaloberst Max Freiherr von Hausen
Chief of Staff: Generalmajor Ernst von Hoeppner
Quartermaster-General: Generalmajor von Leuthold
Chief Engineer: Generalmajor Franz Adams

==== XII (1st Royal Saxon) Corps ====
General der Infanterie Karl d'Elsa
Chief of Staff: Oberstleutnant Hans von Eulitz

23rd Infantry Division

45th Brigade

100th Life-Grenadiers
101st Grenadiers

46th Brigade

108th Schützen
182nd Infantry

23rd Field Artillery Brigade

12th Field Artillery
48th Field Artillery

20th Hussars
1st Company, 12th Pioneer Btln.

32nd Infantry Division

63rd Brigade

102nd Infantry
103rd Infantry
12th Jäger Btln.

64th Brigade

177th Infantry
178th Infantry

32nd Field Artillery Brigade

28th Field Artillery
64th Field Artillery

18th Hussars
2nd Company, 12th Pioneer Btln.
3rd Company, 12th Pioneer Btln.

1st Btln., 19th Field Artillery
29th Aviation Detachment

==== XIX (2nd Royal Saxon) Corps ====
General der Kavallerie Maximilian von Laffert
Chief of Staff: Oberstleutnant Frotscher

24th Infantry Division

47th Brigade

139th Infantry
179th Infantry
13th Jäger Btln.

48th Brigade

106th Infantry
107th Infantry

24th Field Artillery Brigade

76th Field Artillery
77th Field Artillery

18th Uhlans
1st Company, 22nd Pioneer Btln.

40th Infantry Division

88th Brigade

104th Infantry
181st Infantry

89th Brigade

133rd Infantry
134th Infantry

40th Field Artillery Brigade

32nd Field Artillery
68th Field Artillery

19th Hussars
2nd Company, 22nd Pioneer Btln.
3rd Company, 22nd Pioneer Btln.

2nd Btln., 19th Field Artillery
24th Aviation Detachment

==== XII (Royal Saxon) Reserve Corps ====
Commanding General: General der Artillerie Hans von Kirchbach
Chief of Staff: Oberstleutnant von Koppenfels

23rd Reserve Division

45th Reserve Brigade

100th Reserve Infantry
101st Reserve Infantry
12th Reserve Jäger Btln.

46th Reserve Brigade

102nd Reserve Infantry
103rd Reserve Infantry

23rd Reserve Field Artillery
Saxon Reserve Hussars
4th Company, 12th Reserve Pioneer Btln.

24th Reserve Division

47th Reserve Brigade

104th Reserve Infantry
106th Reserve Infantry
13th Reserve Jäger Btln.

48th Reserve Brigade

107th Reserve Infantry
133rd Reserve Infantry

24th Reserve Field Artillery
Saxon Reserve Uhlans
1st Company, 12th Reserve Pioneer Btln.
2nd Company, 12th Reserve Pioneer Btln.

==== Army Troops ====
3rd (Mortar) Btln., 19th Field Artillery
23rd Pioneers
22nd Aviation Detachment
47th Mixed Landwehr Brigade

104th Landwehr Infantry
106th Landwehr Infantry
2nd Landwehr Cavalry Squadron
Landwehr Artillery Battery

== See also ==
- British Expeditionary Force order of battle (1914)

== Sources ==
- Ian Sumner "The First Battle of the Marne 1914" Osprey Publishing (May 25, 2010) ISBN 1-84603-502-3
- Asprey R. B. The First Battle of the Marne W&N 1962
- Cassar, George. Kitchener's War: British Strategy from 1914 to 1916. Brassey's Inc. Washington 2004. ISBN 1-57488-708-4
- Evans, M. M. (2004). Battles of World War I. Select Editions. ISBN 1-84193-226-4.
- Isselin, Henri. The Battle of the Marne. London: Elek Books, 1965. (Translation of La Bataille de la Marne, published by Editions B. Arthaud, 1964.)
- Michelin Guide The Marne Battle-Fields (1914) 1925
- Perris, George Herbert. The Battle of the Marne. London: Methuen, 1920.
- Porch, Douglas. The March to the Marne: The French Army, 1870–1914 (Cambridge, 1981 / 2003).
- Tuchman, Barbara. The Guns of August. New York: The Macmillan Company, 1962.
- von Hausen, Max. Erinnerungen an den Marnefeldzug 1914. (Translation: "Reminiscences of the Marne Campaign 1914") Dresden: K.F. Koehler, 1920.
