= Battle of Mons order of battle =

The following units of the German First Army and British Expeditionary Force fought in the Battle of Mons in World War I.

== German First Army ==
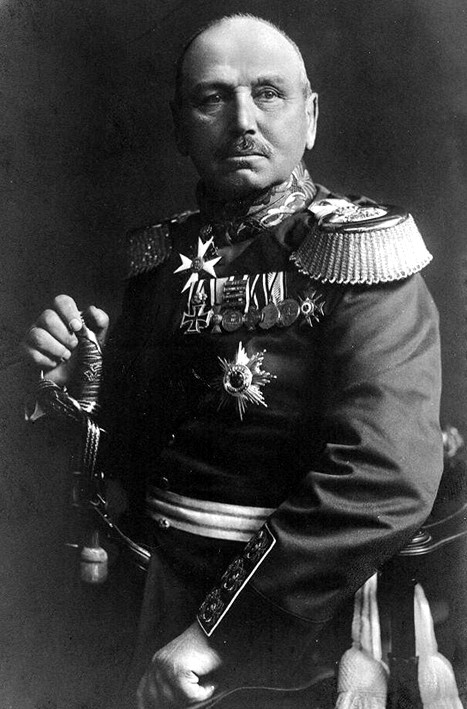
German commander Alexander von Kluck

First Army, commanded by Generaloberst Alexander von Kluck

=== II Army Corps ===
30th Aviation Battalion
15th Foot Artillery Regiment (heavy)

3rd Infantry Division

3rd Artillery Brigade

3rd Horse Grenadiers

5th Infantry Brigade

2nd Grenadier Regiment
9th Grenadier Regiment

6th Infantry Brigade

34th Fusilier Regiment
42nd Infantry Regiment

4th Infantry Division

4th Artillery Brigade

12th Dragoons

7th Infantry Brigade

14th Infantry Regiment
149th Infantry Regiment

8th Infantry Brigade

49th Infantry Regiment
140th Infantry Regiment

=== III Army Corps ===
7th Aviation Battalion
2nd Guard Foot Artillery (heavy)
3rd Hussars

5th Infantry Division

5th Artillery Brigade

9th Infantry Brigade

8th Leib Grenadier Regiment
48th Infantry Regiment

10th Infantry Brigade

12th Grenadier Regiment
52nd Infantry Regiment

6th Infantry Division

6th Artillery Brigade

11th Infantry Brigade

20th Infantry Regiment
35th Fusilier Regiment

12th Infantry Brigade

24th Infantry Regiment
64th Infantry Regiment
3rd Jaeger Battalion

=== IV Army Corps ===
9th Aviation Battalion
4th Foot Artillery Regiment (heavy)
10th Hussars

7th Infantry Division

7th Artillery Brigade

13th Infantry Brigade

26th Infantry Regiment
66th Infantry Regiment

14th Infantry Brigade

27th Infantry Regiment
165th Infantry Regiment

8th Infantry Division

8th Artillery Brigade

15th Infantry Brigade

36th Fusilier Regiment
93rd Infantry Regiment

16th Infantry Brigade

72nd Infantry Regiment
153rd Infantry Regiment
4th Jaeger Battalion

=== IX Army Corps ===
9th Aviation Battalion
20th Foot Artillery Regiment (heavy)
16th Dragoons

17th Infantry Division

17th Artillery Brigade

33rd Infantry Brigade

75th Infantry Regiment
76th Infantry Regiment

34th Infantry Brigade

89th Grenadier Regiment
90th Fusilier Regiment
9th Jaeger Battalion

18th Infantry Division

18th Artillery Brigade

35th Infantry Brigade

84th Infantry Regiment
86th Fusilier Regiment

36th Infantry Brigade

31st Infantry Regiment
85th Infantry Regiment

=== III Reserve Corps ===
5th Reserve Division

2nd Reserve Dragoon Regiment (3 squadrons)
6th Reserve Field Artillery Regiment (6 batteries)

9th Reserve Infantry Brigade

8th Reserve Infantry Regiment
48th Reserve Infantry Regiment

10th Reserve Infantry Brigade

12th Reserve Infantry Regiment
52nd Reserve Infantry Regiment

6th Reserve Division

3rd Reserve Uhlan Regiment (3 squadrons)
6th Reserve Field Artillery Regiment (6 batteries)

11th Reserve Infantry Brigade

20th Reserve Infantry Regiment
24th Reserve Infantry Regiment

12th Reserve Infantry Brigade

26th Reserve Infantry Regiment
35th Reserve Infantry Regiment

=== IV Reserve Corps ===
7th Reserve Division

1st Reserve Schwere Reiter Regiment (3 squadrons)
7th Field Artillery Regiment (6 batteries)

13th Reserve Brigade

27th Reserve Infantry Regiment
36th Reserve Infantry Regiment

14th Reserve Brigade

66th Reserve Infantry Regiment
72nd Reserve Infantry Regiment

4th Reserve Jaeger Battalion

22nd Reserve Division

1st Reserve Jäger zu Pferde Regiment (3 squadrons)
22nd Reserve Field Artillery Regiment (6 batteries)

43rd Reserve Infantry Brigade

71st Reserve Infantry Regiment
94th Reserve Infantry Regiment
11th Reserve Jaeger Battalion

44th Reserve Infantry Brigade

32nd Reserve Infantry Regiment
82nd Reserve Infantry Regiment

10th Mixed Landwehr Brigade

12th Landwehr Infantry Regiment
52nd Landwehr Infantry Regiment

11th Mixed Landwehr Brigade

20th Landwehr Infantry Regiment
35th Landwehr Infantry Regiment

27th Landwehr Brigade

53rd Landwehr Infantry Regiment
55th Landwehr Infantry Regiment

Composite Landwehr Cavalry Unit (3 squadrons) Composite Lansturm Artillery Unit (2 batteries)

Army Troops

12th Aviation Battalion

== British Expeditionary Force ==
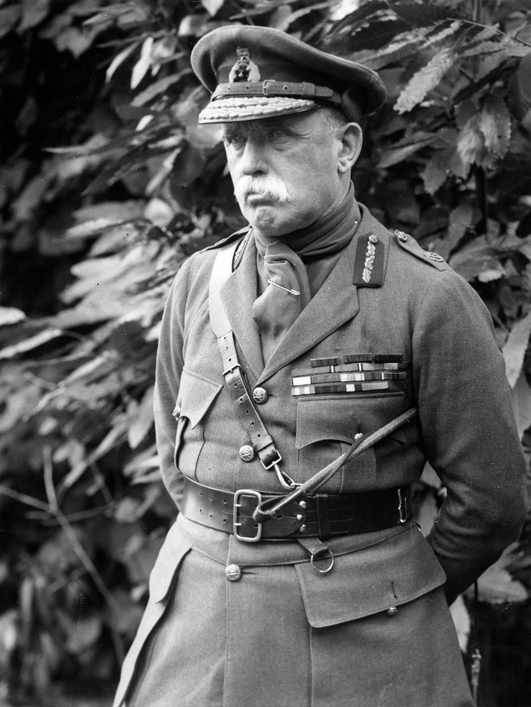
British commander John French commander of the BEF

British Expeditionary Force, commanded by Field Marshal Sir John French

Army Troops

A and C Squadrons North Irish Horse
B Squadron South Irish Horse
1st Bn Queens Own Cameron Highlanders

Line of communications defence troops

1st Devonshire
19th Infantry Brigade (formed 22 August 1914)

2nd Bn Royal Welsh Fusiliers
1st Bn Cameronians (Scottish Rifles)
1st Bn Duke of Cambridge’s Own
2nd Argyll and Sutherland Highlanders

=== I Corps ===
I Corps, commanded by Lieutenant-General Douglas Haig

1st Division (Lomax)

1st Guards Brigade

1st Coldstream Guards
1st Scots Guards
1st Black Watch
2nd Royal Munster Fusiliers

2nd Infantry Brigade

2nd Royal Sussex Regiment
1st Loyal North Lancashire Regiment
1st Northamptonshire Regiment
2nd Kings Royal Rifle Corps

3rd Infantry Brigade

1st Royal West Surrey Regiment
1st South Wales Borderers
1st Gloucestershire Regiment
2nd Welsh

XXV Brigade, Royal Field Artillery

113th Battery
114th Battery
115th Battery

XXVI Brigade, Royal Field Artillery

116th Battery
117th Battery
118th Battery

XXXIX Brigade, Royal Field Artillery

46th Battery
51st Battery
54th Battery

XLIII (Howitzer) Brigade, Royal Field Artillery

30th (H) Battery
40th (H) Battery
57th (H) Battery

26th Heavy Battery Royal Garrison Artillery

2nd Division (Monro)

4th Guards Brigade

2nd Grenadier Guards
2nd Coldstream Guards
3rd Coldstream Guards
1st Irish Guards

5th Infantry Brigade

2nd Worcestershire
2nd Oxfordshire and Buckinghamshire Light Infantry
2nd Highland Light Infantry
2nd Connaught Rangers

6th Infantry Brigade

1st Liverpool Regiment
2nd South Staffordshire
1st Royal Berkshire
1st Kings Royal Rifle Corps

XXXIV Brigade, Royal Field Artillery

22nd Battery
50th Battery
70th Battery

XXXVI Brigade, Royal Field Artillery

15th Battery
48th Battery
71st Battery

XLI Brigade, Royal Field Artillery

9th Battery
16th Battery
17th Battery

XLIV (Howitzer) Brigade, Royal Field Artillery

47th (H) Battery
56th (H) Battery
60th (H) Battery
35th Heavy Battery Royal Garrison Artillery

RAMC

5th Field Ambulance

=== II Corps ===
II Corps, commanded by General Horace Smith-Dorrien

3rd Division (Hamilton)

7th Infantry Brigade

3rd Bn Worcestershire Regiment
2nd Bn South Lancashire Regiment
1st Bn Duke of Edinburgh's (Wiltshire Regiment)
2nd Bn Royal Irish Rifles

8th Infantry Brigade

2nd Royal Scots
2nd Royal Irish Regiment
4th Middlesex Regiment
1st Gordon Highlanders

9th Infantry Brigade

1st Northumberland Fusiliers
4th Royal Fusiliers
1st Lincolnshire
1st Royal Scots Fusiliers

XXIII Brigade, Royal Field Artillery

107th Battery
108th Battery
109th Battery

XL Brigade, Royal Field Artillery

6th Battery
23rd Battery
49th Battery

XLII Brigade, Royal Field Artillery

29th Battery
41st Battery
45th Battery

XXX (Howitzer) Brigade, Royal Field Artillery

128th (H) Battery
129th (H) Battery
130th (H) Battery

48th Heavy Battery Royal Garrison Artillery

5th Division (Fergusson)

13th Infantry Brigade

2nd Bn Kings Own Scottish Borderers
2nd Bn Duke of Wellington’s
1st Bn Royal West Kent
2nd Bn Yorkshire Light Infantry

14th Infantry Brigade

2nd Bn Suffolk Regiment
1st Bn East Surrey Regiment
1st Bn Duke of Cornwall's Light Infantry
2nd Bn Manchester Regiment

15th Infantry Brigade

1st Bn Norfolk Regiment
1st Bn Bedfordshire Regiment
1st Bn Cheshire Regiment
1st Bn Dorsetshire Regiment

XV Brigade, Royal Field Artillery

11th Battery
52nd Battery
80th Battery

XXVII Brigade, Royal Field Artillery

119th Battery
120th Battery
121st Battery

XXVIII Brigade, Royal Field Artillery

122nd Battery
123rd Battery
124th Battery

VIII (Howitzer) Brigade, Royal Field Artillery

37th (H) Battery
61st (H) Battery
65th (H) Battery

108th Heavy Battery Royal Garrison Artillery

=== Cavalry Division ===
Cavalry Division, commanded by Major-General Edmund Allenby

1st Cavalry Brigade

2nd Dragoon Guards
5th Dragoon Guards
11th Hussars

2nd Cavalry Brigade

4th Dragoon Guards
9th Lancers
18th Hussars

3rd Cavalry Brigade

4th (Queen's Own) Hussars
5th (Royal Irish) Lancers
16th (The Queen's) Lancers

4th Cavalry Brigade

6th Dragoon Guards (Carabineers)
3rd (The King's Own) Hussars
Household Cavalry Composite Regiment

5th Cavalry Brigade

2nd Dragoons (Royal Scots Greys)
12th (The Prince of Wales's) Royal Regiment of Lancers
20th Hussars

Artillery

III Brigade, Royal Horse Artillery

D Battery, RHA
E Battery, RHA

VII Brigade, Royal Horse Artillery

I Battery, RHA
L Battery, RHA

=== Royal Flying Corps in the Field ===
Royal Flying Corps, commanded by Brigadier-General David Henderson

2nd Aeroplane Squadron (Charles Burke)
3rd Aeroplane Squadron (John Salmond)
4th Aeroplane Squadron (Raleigh)
5th Aeroplane Squadron (John Frederick Andrews Higgins)
1st Aircraft Park (Carden)

== Sources ==
- Bell, Ron. “The Old Contemptibles.” Strategy & Tactics, Number 228 (May/June 2005).
- Terraine, John. Mons, The Retreat to Victory. Wordsworth. pp. 200–202
