= 28th Cavalry =

28th Cavalry may refer to:

== Divisions ==
- 28th Cavalry Division (Soviet Union)

== Regiments ==
- 28th Cavalry Regiment (United States)
- 28th Light Cavalry, British Indian Army
- 28th Mississippi Cavalry Regiment, Confederate States Army
- 28th Texas Cavalry Regiment, Confederate States Army

== Battalions ==
- 28th (Westminster Dragoons) Battalion, Imperial Yeomanry

== See also ==
- 28th Division (disambiguation)
- 28th Brigade (disambiguation)
- 28th Regiment (disambiguation)
- 28th (disambiguation)
