= XXVIII Corps =

28 Corps, 28th Corps, Twenty Eighth Corps, or XXVIII Corps may refer to:

== Germany ==
- XXVIII Army Corps (Wehrmacht), World War II

== Russia and Soviet Union ==
=== Russian Empire ===
- 28th Army Corps (Russian Empire), World War I

=== Soviet Union ===
- 28th Guards Rifle Corps
- 28th Mechanized Corps
- 28th Rifle Corps

== United Kingdom ==
- 28th (South Brent) Devonshire Rifle Volunteer Corps
- 28th Kent (Charlton) Rifle Volunteer Corps
- 28th Middlesex Rifle Volunteer Corps
- 28th Staffordshire Rifle Volunteer Corps

== See also ==
- List of military corps by number
- 28th Army (disambiguation)
- 28th Battalion (disambiguation)
- 28th Brigade (disambiguation)
- 28th Division (disambiguation)
- 28th Regiment (disambiguation)
- 28th Squadron (disambiguation)
- 28th (disambiguation)
