= 28th =

28th is the ordinal form of the number 28. 28th or Twenty-eighth may also refer to:

- A fraction, 1/28, equal to one of 28 equal parts
- 28th of the month, a recurring calendar date

== Geography ==
- 28th meridian east, a line of longitude
- 28th meridian west, a line of longitude
- 28th parallel north, a circle of latitude
- 28th parallel south, a circle of latitude
- 28th Avenue
- 28th Street (disambiguation)

== Military ==
- 28th Army (disambiguation)
- 28th Battalion (disambiguation)
- 28th Brigade (disambiguation)
- 28th Division (disambiguation)
- 28th Regiment (disambiguation)
- 28th Squadron (disambiguation)

== Other ==
- Twenty-eighth Amendment (disambiguation)
  - Twenty-eighth Amendment to the United States Constitution, a list of proposed amendments
- 28th century
- 28th century BC

== See also ==
- 28 (disambiguation)
