= 28th Army =

28th Army may refer to:

- 28th Army (People's Republic of China)
- Twenty-Eighth Army (Japan)
- 28th Army (Soviet Union)

== See also ==
- List of armies by number
- XXVIII Corps (disambiguation)
- 28th Division (disambiguation)
- 28th Brigade (disambiguation)
- 28th Regiment (disambiguation)
- 28th Battalion (disambiguation)
- 28th Squadron (disambiguation)
- 28th (disambiguation)
