= III Corps (German Empire) =

III Army Corps III. Armee-Korps
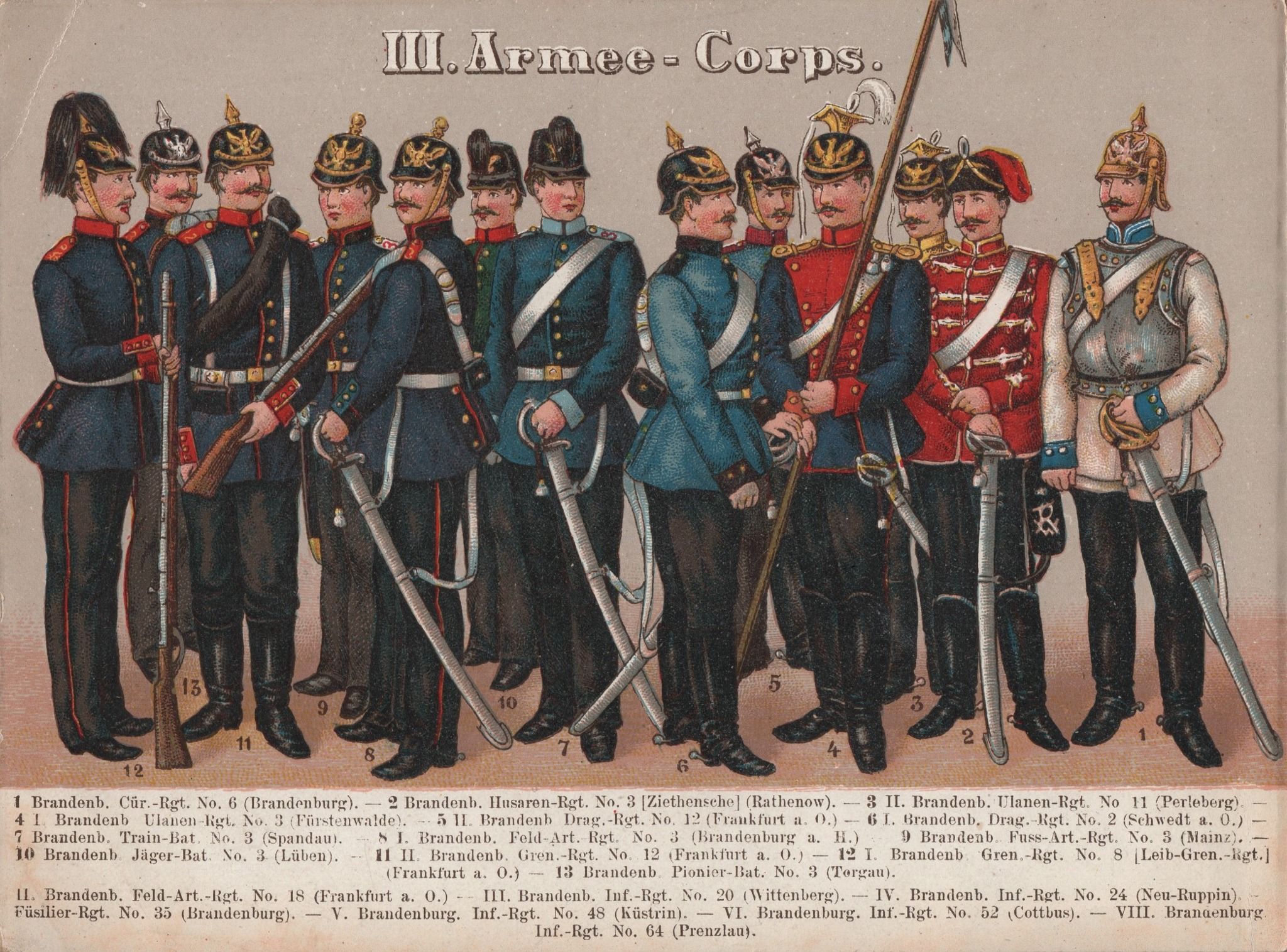
- Uniforms of the III Army Corps during La Belle Époque
- Active: 1813–1919
- Country: Prussia / German Empire
- Type: Corps
- Size: Approximately 44,000 (on mobilisation in 1914)
- Garrison/HQ: Berlin/Genthiner Straße 2
- Shoulder strap piping: Red
- Engagements: Second Schleswig War Battle of Dybbøl Austro-Prussian War Battle of Königgrätz Franco-Prussian War Battle of Spicheren Battle of Mars-la-Tour Battle of Gravelotte Battle of Beaune-la-Rolande Second Battle of Orléans (1870) Battle of Le Mans Siege of Metz World War I Battle of the Frontiers Battle of Mons First Battle of the Marne Battle of Verdun Battle of Amiens (1918)

Commanders
- Notable commanders: Friedrich Graf von Wrangel (1849–1857); Karl von Bülow (1903–1912)

The III Army Corps / III AK (German: III. Armee-Korps) was a corps level command of the Prussian and then the Imperial German Armies from the 19th century to World War I.

It was established in 1814 as the General Headquarters in Berlin (Generalkommando in Berlin) and became the III Army Corps on 3 April 1820. Its headquarters was in Berlin and its catchment area was the Province of Brandenburg.

In peacetime, the Corps was assigned to the IV Army Inspectorate, joining the 1st Army at the start of the First World War. It was still in existence at the end of the war in the 7th Army, Heeresgruppe Deutscher Kronprinz on the Western Front. The Corps was disbanded with the demobilisation of the German Army after World War I.

== War of the Sixth Coalition ==
In 1813 the III Corps fought at the battles of Luckau, Grossbeeren, Dennewitz, Leipzig and Arnhem. In 1814, the corps fought at Hoogstraten and Laon.

Nov. 1813–Jan. 1814 organization of the Corps
Corps	Division	Brigade	Units
III Corps: Friedrich Wilhelm von Bülow; 19,172 infantry 6,240 cavalry	Division: None	3rd Brigade: Karl Heinrich von Zielinski	2nd East Prussian Grenadier Battalion
III Corps: Friedrich Wilhelm von Bülow; 19,172 infantry 6,240 cavalry	Division: None	3rd Brigade: Karl Heinrich von Zielinski	3rd East Prussian Infantry Regiment
III Corps: Friedrich Wilhelm von Bülow; 19,172 infantry 6,240 cavalry	Division: None	3rd Brigade: Karl Heinrich von Zielinski	4th Reserve Infantry Regiment
III Corps: Friedrich Wilhelm von Bülow; 19,172 infantry 6,240 cavalry	Division: None	3rd Brigade: Karl Heinrich von Zielinski	3rd East Prussian Landwehr Regiment
III Corps: Friedrich Wilhelm von Bülow; 19,172 infantry 6,240 cavalry	Division: None	3rd Brigade: Karl Heinrich von Zielinski	1st Leib Hussar Regiment
III Corps: Friedrich Wilhelm von Bülow; 19,172 infantry 6,240 cavalry	Division: None	3rd Brigade: Karl Heinrich von Zielinski	6-pounder Foot Battery Nr. 6
III Corps: Friedrich Wilhelm von Bülow; 19,172 infantry 6,240 cavalry	Division: None	4th Brigade: Heinrich Ludwig August von Thümen	East Prussian Jäger Battalion (2 companies)
III Corps: Friedrich Wilhelm von Bülow; 19,172 infantry 6,240 cavalry	Division: None	4th Brigade: Heinrich Ludwig August von Thümen	4th East Prussian Infantry Regiment
III Corps: Friedrich Wilhelm von Bülow; 19,172 infantry 6,240 cavalry	Division: None	4th Brigade: Heinrich Ludwig August von Thümen	5th Reserve Infantry Regiment
III Corps: Friedrich Wilhelm von Bülow; 19,172 infantry 6,240 cavalry	Division: None	4th Brigade: Heinrich Ludwig August von Thümen	2nd Pommeranian Landwehr Regiment
III Corps: Friedrich Wilhelm von Bülow; 19,172 infantry 6,240 cavalry	Division: None	4th Brigade: Heinrich Ludwig August von Thümen	1st Pommeranian Landwehr Cavalry Regiment
III Corps: Friedrich Wilhelm von Bülow; 19,172 infantry 6,240 cavalry	Division: None	4th Brigade: Heinrich Ludwig August von Thümen	6-pounder Foot Battery Nr. 8
III Corps: Friedrich Wilhelm von Bülow; 19,172 infantry 6,240 cavalry	Division: None	5th Brigade: Karl Ludwig von Borstell	Pommeranian Grenadier Battalion
III Corps: Friedrich Wilhelm von Bülow; 19,172 infantry 6,240 cavalry	Division: None	5th Brigade: Karl Ludwig von Borstell	1st Pommeranian Infantry Regiment
III Corps: Friedrich Wilhelm von Bülow; 19,172 infantry 6,240 cavalry	Division: None	5th Brigade: Karl Ludwig von Borstell	2nd Reserve Infantry Regiment
III Corps: Friedrich Wilhelm von Bülow; 19,172 infantry 6,240 cavalry	Division: None	5th Brigade: Karl Ludwig von Borstell	Elbe Infantry Regiment
III Corps: Friedrich Wilhelm von Bülow; 19,172 infantry 6,240 cavalry	Division: None	5th Brigade: Karl Ludwig von Borstell	2nd Kurmärk Landwehr Regiment
III Corps: Friedrich Wilhelm von Bülow; 19,172 infantry 6,240 cavalry	Division: None	5th Brigade: Karl Ludwig von Borstell	Pommeranian Hussar Regiment
III Corps: Friedrich Wilhelm von Bülow; 19,172 infantry 6,240 cavalry	Division: None	5th Brigade: Karl Ludwig von Borstell	6-pounder Foot Battery Nr. 10
III Corps: Friedrich Wilhelm von Bülow; 19,172 infantry 6,240 cavalry	Division: None	6th Brigade: Karl August Adolf von Krafft	Kolberg Infantry Regiment
III Corps: Friedrich Wilhelm von Bülow; 19,172 infantry 6,240 cavalry	Division: None	6th Brigade: Karl August Adolf von Krafft	9th Reserve Infantry Regiment
III Corps: Friedrich Wilhelm von Bülow; 19,172 infantry 6,240 cavalry	Division: None	6th Brigade: Karl August Adolf von Krafft	1st Neumärk Landwehr Regiment
III Corps: Friedrich Wilhelm von Bülow; 19,172 infantry 6,240 cavalry	Division: None	6th Brigade: Karl August Adolf von Krafft	2nd Pommeranian Landwehr Cavalry Regiment
III Corps: Friedrich Wilhelm von Bülow; 19,172 infantry 6,240 cavalry	Division: None	6th Brigade: Karl August Adolf von Krafft	6-pounder Foot Battery Nr. 16
III Corps: Friedrich Wilhelm von Bülow; 19,172 infantry 6,240 cavalry	Division: Adolph Friedrich von Oppen	Cavalry Brigade: Karl Alexander Wilhelm von Treskow	Queen's Dragoon Regiment
III Corps: Friedrich Wilhelm von Bülow; 19,172 infantry 6,240 cavalry	Division: Adolph Friedrich von Oppen	Cavalry Brigade: Karl Alexander Wilhelm von Treskow	Brandenberg Dragoon Regiment
III Corps: Friedrich Wilhelm von Bülow; 19,172 infantry 6,240 cavalry	Division: Adolph Friedrich von Oppen	Cavalry Brigade: Karl Alexander Wilhelm von Treskow	2nd West Prussian Dragoon Regiment
III Corps: Friedrich Wilhelm von Bülow; 19,172 infantry 6,240 cavalry	Division: Adolph Friedrich von Oppen	Cavalry Brigade: Karl Alexander Wilhelm von Treskow	6-pounder Horse Battery Nr. 5
III Corps: Friedrich Wilhelm von Bülow; 19,172 infantry 6,240 cavalry	Division: Adolph Friedrich von Oppen	Cavalry Brigade: Karl Bernhard Hellmuth von Hobe	Westphalian Uhlan Regiment
III Corps: Friedrich Wilhelm von Bülow; 19,172 infantry 6,240 cavalry	Division: Adolph Friedrich von Oppen	Cavalry Brigade: Karl Bernhard Hellmuth von Hobe	2nd Silesian Hussar Regiment
III Corps: Friedrich Wilhelm von Bülow; 19,172 infantry 6,240 cavalry	Division: Adolph Friedrich von Oppen	Cavalry Brigade: Karl Bernhard Hellmuth von Hobe	Pommeranian National Cavalry Regiment
III Corps: Friedrich Wilhelm von Bülow; 19,172 infantry 6,240 cavalry	Division: Adolph Friedrich von Oppen	Cavalry Brigade: Karl Bernhard Hellmuth von Hobe	6-pounder Horse Battery Nr. 6
III Corps: Friedrich Wilhelm von Bülow; 19,172 infantry 6,240 cavalry	Division: Adolph Friedrich von Oppen	Cavalry Brigade: Hans Joachim Friedrich von Sydow	2nd Kurmärk Landwehr Cavalry Regiment
III Corps: Friedrich Wilhelm von Bülow; 19,172 infantry 6,240 cavalry	Division: Adolph Friedrich von Oppen	Cavalry Brigade: Hans Joachim Friedrich von Sydow	4th Kurmärk Landwehr Cavalry Regiment
III Corps: Friedrich Wilhelm von Bülow; 19,172 infantry 6,240 cavalry	Division: None	Corps Artillery: Karl Friedrich von Holtzendorff	12-pounder Foot Batteries Nrs. 4 and 5
III Corps: Friedrich Wilhelm von Bülow; 19,172 infantry 6,240 cavalry	Division: None	Corps Artillery: Karl Friedrich von Holtzendorff	6-pounder Foot Batteries Nrs. 19 and ?
III Corps: Friedrich Wilhelm von Bülow; 19,172 infantry 6,240 cavalry	Division: None	Corps Artillery: Karl Friedrich von Holtzendorff	6-pounder Horse Battery Nr. 11
III Corps: Friedrich Wilhelm von Bülow; 19,172 infantry 6,240 cavalry	Division: None	Corps Artillery: Karl Friedrich von Holtzendorff	Park Columns Nrs. 3, 4 and 6
III Corps: Friedrich Wilhelm von Bülow; 19,172 infantry 6,240 cavalry	Division: None	Corps Artillery: Karl Friedrich von Holtzendorff	Pioneer Companies Nrs. 4 and 5

== Second Schleswig War ==
Part of the Corps (10th Brigade of the 5th Division and the 6th Division) fought in the Second Schleswig War of 1864, including the key Battle of Dybbøl, or Düppeler Heights.

== Austro-Prussian War ==
The III Corps formed part of Prince Friedrich Karl of Prussia's 1st Army and fought in the Austro-Prussian War against Austria in 1866, including the Battle of Königgrätz.

== Franco-Prussian War ==
In the Franco-Prussian War of 1870-71, the Corps joined the 2nd Army. It saw action in the battles of Spicheren, Mars-la-Tour (a key part), Gravelotte, Beaune-la-Rolande, Orléans, and Le Mans, and in the Siege of Metz.

== Peacetime organisation ==
The 25 peacetime Corps of the German Army (Guards, I - XXI, I - III Bavarian) had a reasonably standardised organisation. Each consisted of two divisions with usually two infantry brigades, one field artillery brigade and a cavalry brigade each. Each brigade normally consisted of two regiments of the appropriate type, so each Corps normally commanded 8 infantry, 4 field artillery and 4 cavalry regiments. There were exceptions to this rule:

V, VI, VII, IX and XIV Corps each had a 5 infantry brigades (so 10 infantry regiments)
II, XIII, XVIII and XXI Corps had a 9 infantry regiments
I, VI and XVI Corps had a 3 cavalry brigades (so 6 cavalry regiments)
the Guards Corps had 11 infantry regiments (in 5 brigades) and 8 cavalry regiments (in 4 brigades).

Each Corps also directly controlled a number of other units. This could include one or more

Foot Artillery Regiment
Jäger Battalion
Pioneer Battalion
Train Battalion

Peacetime organization of the Corps
Corps	Division	Brigade	Units	Garrison
III Corps	5th Division	9th Infantry Brigade	8th (1st Brandenburg) Life Grenadiers "King Frederick William III"	Frankfurt an der Oder
III Corps	5th Division	9th Infantry Brigade	48th (5th Brandenburg) Infantry "von Stülpnagel"	Küstrin
III Corps	5th Division	10th Infantry Brigade	12th (2nd Brandenburg) Grenadiers "Prince Charles of Prussia"	Frankfurt an der Oder
III Corps	5th Division	10th Infantry Brigade	52nd (6th Brandenburg) Infantry "von Alvensleben"	Cottbus, I Bn at Crossen an der Oder
III Corps	5th Division	5th Field Artillery Brigade	18th (2nd Brandenburg) Field Artillery "General-Feldzeugmeister"	Frankfurt an der Oder
III Corps	5th Division	5th Field Artillery Brigade	54th (Neumark) Field Artillery	Küstrin, Landsberg an der Warthe
III Corps	5th Division	5th Cavalry Brigade	2nd (1st Brandenburg) Dragoons	Schwedt
III Corps	5th Division	5th Cavalry Brigade	3rd (1st Brandenburg) Uhlans "Emperor Alexander II of Russia"	Fürstenwalde
III Corps	6th Division	11th Infantry Brigade	20th (3rd Brandenburg) Infantry "Count Tauentzien von Wittenberg"	Wittenberg
III Corps	6th Division	11th Infantry Brigade	35th (Brandenburg) Fusiliers "Prince Henry of Prussia"	Brandenburg an der Havel
III Corps	6th Division	12th Infantry Brigade	24th (4th Brandenburg) Infantry "Grand Duke Frederick Francis II of Mecklenburg-Schwerin"	Neuruppin
III Corps	6th Division	12th Infantry Brigade	64th (8th Brandenburg) Infantry "General Field Marshal Prince Frederick Charles of Prussia"	Prenzlau, III Bn at Angermünde
III Corps	6th Division	6th Field Artillery Brigade	3rd (1st Brandenburg) Field Artillery "General-Feldzeugmeister"	Brandenburg an der Havel
III Corps	6th Division	6th Field Artillery Brigade	39th (Kurmark) Field Artillery	Perleberg
III Corps	6th Division	6th Cavalry Brigade	6th (Brandenburg) Cuirassiers "Emperor Nicholas I of Russia"	Brandenburg an der Havel
III Corps	6th Division	6th Cavalry Brigade	3rd (Brandenburg) Hussars “von Zieten”	Rathenow
III Corps	Corps Troops		3rd (Brandenburg) Jäger Battalion	Lübben
III Corps	Corps Troops		3rd (1st Brandenburg) Pioneer Battalion "von Rauch"	Magdeburg
III Corps	Corps Troops		28th (2nd Brandenburg) Pioneer Battalion	Küstrin
III Corps	Corps Troops		2nd Telegraph Battalion	Frankfurt an der Oder, Cottbus
III Corps	Corps Troops		3rd (Brandenburg) Train Battalion	Spandau
III Corps	Berlin Defence Command (Landwehr-Inspektion)			Berlin

== World War I ==
=== Organisation on mobilisation ===
On mobilization on 2 August 1914 the Corps was restructured. 5th Cavalry Brigade was withdrawn to form part of the 2nd Cavalry Division and the 6th Cavalry Brigade was broken up: the 3rd Hussar Regiment was raised to a strength of 6 squadrons before being split into two half-regiments of 3 squadrons each and the half-regiments were assigned as divisional cavalry to 5th and 6th Divisions; the 6th Cuirassier Regiment was likewise assigned as two half-regiments to 22nd and 38th Divisions of XI Corps. Divisions received engineer companies and other support units from the Corps headquarters. In summary, III Corps mobilised with 25 infantry battalions, 9 machine gun companies (54 machine guns), 6 cavalry squadrons, 24 field artillery batteries (144 guns), 4 heavy artillery batteries (16 guns), 3 pioneer companies and an aviation detachment.

Initial wartime organization of the Corps
Corps	Division	Brigade	Units
III Corps	5th Division	9th Infantry Brigade	8th Leib Grenadier Regiment
III Corps	5th Division	9th Infantry Brigade	48th Infantry Regiment
III Corps	5th Division	10th Infantry Brigade	12th Grenadier Regiment
III Corps	5th Division	10th Infantry Brigade	52nd Infantry Regiment
III Corps	5th Division	10th Infantry Brigade	3rd Jäger Battalion
III Corps	5th Division	5th Field Artillery Brigade	18th Field Artillery Regiment
III Corps	5th Division	5th Field Artillery Brigade	54th Field Artillery Regiment
III Corps	5th Division		staff and half of 3rd Hussar Regiment
III Corps	5th Division		2nd Company, 3rd Pioneer Battalion
III Corps	5th Division		3rd Company, 3rd Pioneer Battalion
III Corps	5th Division		5th Divisional Pontoon Train
III Corps	5th Division		1st Medical Company
III Corps	5th Division		3rd Medical Company
III Corps	6th Division	11th Infantry Brigade	20th Infantry Regiment
III Corps	6th Division	11th Infantry Brigade	35th Fusilier Regiment
III Corps	6th Division	12th Infantry Brigade	24th Infantry Regiment
III Corps	6th Division	12th Infantry Brigade	64th Infantry Regiment
III Corps	6th Division	6th Field Artillery Brigade	3rd Field Artillery Regiment
III Corps	6th Division	6th Field Artillery Brigade	39th Field Artillery Regiment
III Corps	6th Division		half of 3rd Hussar Regiment
III Corps	6th Division		1st Company, 3rd Pioneer Battalion
III Corps	6th Division		6th Divisional Pontoon Train
III Corps	6th Division		2nd Medical Company
III Corps	Corps Troops		I Battalion, 2nd Guards Foot Artillery Regiment
III Corps	Corps Troops		7th Aviation Detachment
III Corps	Corps Troops		3rd Corps Pontoon Train
III Corps	Corps Troops		3rd Telephone Detachment
III Corps	Corps Troops		3rd Pioneer Searchlight Section
III Corps	Corps Troops		Munition Trains and Columns corresponding to II Corps

=== Combat chronicle ===
On mobilisation, III Corps was assigned to the 1st Army on the right wing of the forces for the Schlieffen Plan offensive in August 1914 on the Western Front. It participated in the Battle of Mons and the First Battle of the Marne which marked the end of the German advances in 1914. Later, it participated in the Battle of Verdun and the Battle of Amiens (1918).

It was still in existence at the end of the war in the 7th Army, Heeresgruppe Deutscher Kronprinz on the Western Front.

== Commanders ==
The III Corps had the following commanders during its existence:

From	Rank	Name
1814	General der Infanterie	Bogislav Friedrich Emanuel von Tauentzien
7 April 1820	General der Infanterie	Frederick William, Crown Prince of Prussia
22 March 1824	Generalleutnant	Prince Wilhelm of Prussia
30 March 1838	Generalleutnant	Adolf Eduard von Thile
9 May 1840	General der Infanterie	Karl von Weyrach
13 November 1849	General der Kavallerie	Friedrich Graf von Wrangel
19 September 1857	General der Kavallerie	Prince August of Württemberg
3 June 1858	General der Infanterie	Wilhelm Fürst von Radziwill
1 July 1860	General der Kavallerie	Prince Friedrich Karl of Prussia
18 July 1870	General der Infanterie	Constantin von Alvensleben
27 March 1873	General der Infanterie	Julius von Groß genannt Schwarzhoff
18 October 1881	General der Infanterie	Alexander August Wilhelm von Pape
21 August 1884	Generalleutnant	Hermann Graf von Wartensleben
12 July 1888	General der Infanterie	Walther Bronsart von Schellendorff
24 March 1890	Generalleutnant	Maximilian von Versen
7 October 1893	General der Kavallerie	Prince Frederick of Hohenzollern-Sigmaringen
18 April 1896	General der Infanterie	Friedrich von Lignitz
27 January 1903	General der Infanterie	Karl von Bülow
1 October 1912	General der Infanterie	Ewald von Lochow
25 November 1916	Generalleutnant	Walther von Lüttwitz
12 August 1918	Generalleutnant	Alfred von Böckmann

== See also ==
- Franco-Prussian War order of battle
- German Army order of battle (1914)
- German Army order of battle, Western Front (1918)
- List of Imperial German infantry regiments
- List of Imperial German artillery regiments
- List of Imperial German cavalry regiments
- Order of battle at Mons
- Order of battle of the First Battle of the Marne
- List of forces involved in the Battle of Amiens

== Bibliography ==
- Cron, Hermann (2002). Imperial German Army 1914-18: Organisation, Structure, Orders-of-Battle [first published: 1937]. Helion & Co. ISBN 1-874622-70-1.
- Ellis, John; Cox, Michael (1993). The World War I Databook. Aurum Press Ltd. ISBN 1-85410-766-6.
- Haythornthwaite, Philip J. (1996). The World War One Source Book. Arms and Armour. ISBN 1-85409-351-7.
- Nafziger, George (2015). The End of Empire: Napoleon's 1814 Campaign. Solihull, UK: Helion & Company. ISBN 978-1-909982-96-3.
- Wegner, Günter (1993). Stellenbesetzung der deutschen Heere 1815-1939, Bd. 1. Biblio Verlag, Osnabrück.
- Histories of Two Hundred and Fifty-One Divisions of the German Army which Participated in the War (1914–1918), compiled from records of Intelligence section of the General Staff, American Expeditionary Forces, at General Headquarters, Chaumont, France 1919. The London Stamp Exchange Ltd. 1989 [1920]. ISBN 0-948130-87-3.
- The German Forces in the Field; 7th Revision, 11th November 1918; Compiled by the General Staff, War Office. Imperial War Museum, London and the Battery Press. 1995 [1918]. ISBN 978-1-870423-95-3.
