= NS28 =

NS28, NS 28, NS-28, NS.28, or variation, may refer to:

== Places ==
- Marina South Pier MRT station (station code: NS28), Straits View, Singapore; a mass transit station
- Halifax Needham (constituency N.S. 28), Nova Scotia, Canada; a provincial electoral district

== Other uses ==
- New Penguin Shakespeare volume 28
- Blue Origin NS-28, a November 2024 suborbital spaceflight by the New Shepard tourist rocket

== See also ==
- NS (disambiguation)
- 28 (disambiguation)
