= 28th Division =

28th Division or 28th Infantry Division may refer to:

== Infantry divisions ==
- 28th Division (People's Republic of China)
- 28th Division (German Empire)
- 28th Reserve Division, German Empire
- 28th Jäger Division, Wehrmacht
- 28th SS Volunteer Grenadier Division Wallonia, Germany
- 28th Infantry Division of Kordestan, Iran
- 28th Infantry Division "Aosta", Kingdom of Italy
- 28th Division (Imperial Japanese Army)
- 28th Infantry Division (Poland)
- 28th Infantry Division (Russian Empire)
- 28th Guards Rifle Division, Soviet Union, later the 28th Guards Motor Rifle Division
- 28th Rifle Division, Soviet Union
- 28th Division (Spain)
- 28th Infantry Division (Turkey)
- 28th Division (United Kingdom)
- 28th Infantry Division (United States)
- 28th Division (Yugoslav Partisans)

== Armoured divisions ==
- 28th Tank Division, Soviet Union

== Aviation divisions ==
- 28th Air Division, United States Air Force

== Other divisions ==
- 28th Guards Rocket Division, Soviet Union
- 28th Naval Auxiliary Division, Ukraine

== See also ==
- 28th Division Highway
- List of military divisions by number
- 28th Army (disambiguation)
- XXVIII Corps (disambiguation)
- 28th Brigade (disambiguation)
- 28th Regiment (disambiguation)
- 28th Battalion (disambiguation)
- 28th Squadron (disambiguation)
