= 28th Brigade =

28th Brigade or 28th Infantry Brigade may refer to:

== Australia ==
- 28th Brigade (Australia)

== British Commonwealth ==
- 28th Commonwealth Infantry Brigade
- 28th Commonwealth Infantry Brigade Group

== India ==
- 28th Indian Brigade of the British Indian Army in the First World War
- 28th Indian Infantry Brigade of the British Indian Army in the Second World War

== Russia ==
- 28th Separate Motor Rifle Brigade

== Ukraine ==
- 28th Mechanized Brigade

== United Kingdom ==
- 28th (Thames and Medway) Anti-Aircraft Brigade
- 28th Armoured Brigade
- 28th Infantry Brigade (United Kingdom)
- 28th Reserve Brigade
- 28th Brigade Royal Field Artillery

== United States ==
- 28th Division Sustainment Brigade
- 28th Combat Aviation Brigade

== See also ==
- 28th Division (disambiguation)
- 28th Regiment (disambiguation)
- 28th Battalion (disambiguation)
- 28 Squadron (disambiguation)
