= 17th Division (German Empire) =

17th Division (17. Division); in 1870–71 and from August 2, 1914, 17th Infantry Division (17. Infanterie-Division)
- Active: 1866–1919
- Country: Prussia/Germany
- Branch: Army
- Type: Infantry (in peacetime included cavalry)
- Size: Approx. 15,000
- Part of: IX. Army Corps (IX. Armeekorps)
- Garrison/HQ: Kiel (1866-1871), Schwerin (1871-1919)
- Engagements: Franco-Prussian War: Metz, Paris, Loigny-Poupry, 2nd Orléans, Le Mans; World War I: Liège, Great Retreat, 1st Marne, Somme, Passchendaele, German spring offensive, Hundred Days Offensive

The 17th Division (17. Division) was a unit of the Prussian/German Army. It was formed on October 11, 1866, and initially headquartered in Kiel. It moved its headquarters to Schwerin in 1871. The division was subordinated in peacetime to the IX Army Corps (IX. Armeekorps). The division was disbanded in 1919 during the demobilization of the German Army after the First World War.

== Recruitment ==
The 17th Division was one of the more mixed units of the German Army. It was formed by merging the contingents of the Hanseatic Cities with those of the Mecklenburg grand duchies. The division's 33rd Infantry Brigade was composed of the contingents of Hamburg and Bremen (and until the formation of the 162nd Infantry Regiment in 1897, that of Lübeck). The division's 34th (Grand Ducal Mecklenburg) Infantry Brigade was composed of the infantry contingents of the grand duchies of Mecklenburg-Schwerin and Mecklenburg-Strelitz. The 81st Infantry Brigade, formed in 1897, included the newly raised Lübeck regiment and a Prussian regiment from Schleswig-Holstein. The divisional cavalry brigade was the 17th (Grand Ducal Mecklenburg) Cavalry Brigade, with two dragoon regiments from Mecklenburg-Schwerin and, at various periods in its history, attached Prussian cavalry. The 17th Artillery Brigade included a regiment from Holstein and a regiment from the two Mecklenburg grand duchies.

== Combat chronicle ==
In the Franco-Prussian War of 1870-71, the division was initially part of the reserve of the Prussian Army. It was sent into action in September 1870, beginning with the Siege of Metz and the Siege of Paris. The division then entered the Loire campaign, fighting in the battles of Loigny-Poupry, 2nd Orléans, Beaugency-Cravant, and Le Mans.

During World War I, the division marched through Luxembourg, Belgium and France, in what became known to the Allies as the Great Retreat, culminating in the First Battle of the Marne. One of its brigades was detached for the Battle of Liège. In 1916, it fought in the Battle of the Somme. It saw action in 1917 in the Battle of Passchendaele, also known as the Third Battle of Ypres and to the Germans as the Autumn Battle in Flanders. It participated in the 1918 German spring offensive and defended against the subsequent Allied counteroffensives, including the Hundred Days Offensive. Allied intelligence rated it a first class division, one of the best in the German Army.

== Order of battle in the Franco-Prussian War ==
During wartime, the 17th Division, like other regular German divisions, was redesignated an infantry division. The organization of the 17th Infantry Division in 1870 at the beginning of the Franco-Prussian War was as follows:

- 33. Infanterie-Brigade
  - Füsilier-Regiment Nr. 36
  - Infanterie-Regiment Nr. 75
  - Infanterie-Regiment Nr. 76
- 34. Infanterie-Brigade
  - Mecklenburgisches Grenadier-Regiment Nr. 89
  - Mecklenburgisches Füsilier-Regiment Nr. 90
  - Mecklenburgisches Jäger-Bataillon Nr. 14
- 17. Kavallerie-Brigade
  - 1. Mecklenburgisches Dragoner-Regiment Nr. 17
  - 2. Mecklenburgisches Dragoner-Regiment Nr. 18
  - Ulanen-Regiment Nr. 11

== Pre-World War I organization ==
German divisions underwent various organizational changes after the Franco-Prussian War. As noted above, a third brigade was added in 1897. The organization of the 17th Division in 1914, shortly before the outbreak of World War I, was as follows:

- 33. Infanterie-Brigade
  - Infanterie-Regiment Bremen (1. Hanseatisches) Nr. 75
  - Infanterie-Regiment Hamburg (2. Hanseatisches) Nr. 76
- 34.Infanterie-Brigade (Großherzoglich Mecklenburgisches)
  - Großherzoglich Mecklenburgisches Grenadier-Regiment Nr. 89
  - Großherzoglich Mecklenburgisches Füsilier-Regiment Kaiser Wilhelm Nr. 90
- 81. Infanterie-Brigade
  - Infanterie-Regiment Lübeck (3. Hanseatisches) Nr. 162
  - Schleswig-Holsteinisches Infanterie-Regiment Nr. 163
- 17. Kavallerie-Brigade (Großherzoglich Mecklenburgisches))
  - 1. Großherzoglich Mecklenburgisches Dragoner-Regiment Nr. 17 (Assigned to IX Armeekorps, fought on Eastern Front for entire war
  - 2. Großherzoglich Mecklenburgisches Dragoner-Regiment Nr. 18
- 17. Feldartillerie-Brigade:
  - Holsteinisches Feldartillerie-Regiment Nr. 24
  - Großherzoglich Mecklenburgisches Feldartillerie-Regiment Nr. 60

== Order of battle on mobilization ==
On mobilization in August 1914 at the beginning of World War I, most divisional cavalry, including brigade headquarters, was withdrawn to form cavalry divisions or split up among divisions as reconnaissance units. Divisions received engineer companies and other support units from their higher headquarters. The 17th Division was again renamed the 17th Infantry Division. The 81st Infantry Brigade was sent to the 17th Reserve Division. The 17th Infantry Division's initial wartime organization was as follows:

- 33. Infanterie-Brigade
  - Infanterie-Regiment Bremen (1. Hanseatisches) Nr. 75
  - Infanterie-Regiment Hamburg (2. Hanseatisches) Nr. 76
- 34.Infanterie-Brigade
  - Großherzoglich Mecklenburgisches Grenadier-Regiment Nr. 89
  - Großherzoglich Mecklenburgisches Füsilier-Regiment Kaiser Wilhelm Nr. 90
  - Lauenburgisches Jäger-Bataillon Nr. 9
- Stab u. 3.Eskadron/2. Hannoversches Dragoner-Regiment Nr. 16
- 17. Feldartillerie-Brigade:
  - Holsteinisches Feldartillerie-Regiment Nr. 24
  - Großherzoglich Mecklenburgisches Feldartillerie-Regiment Nr. 60
- 1.Kompanie/Schleswig-Holsteinisches Pionier-Bataillon Nr. 9

== Late World War I organization ==
Divisions underwent many changes during the war, with regiments moving from division to division, and some being destroyed and rebuilt. During the war, most divisions became triangular - one infantry brigade with three infantry regiments rather than two infantry brigades of two regiments (a "square division"). An artillery commander replaced the artillery brigade headquarters, the cavalry was further reduced, the engineer contingent was increased, and a divisional signals command was created. The 17th Infantry Division's order of battle on May 21, 1918, was as follows:

- 34. Infanterie-Brigade
  - Infanterie-Regiment Bremen (1. Hanseatisches) Nr. 75
  - Großherzoglich Mecklenburgisches Grenadier-Regiment Nr. 89
  - Großherzoglich Mecklenburgisches Füsilier-Regiment Kaiser Wilhelm Nr. 90
  - Maschinengewehr-Scharfschützen-Abteilung Nr. 75

4.Eskadron/2. Hannoversches Dragoner-Regiment Nr. 16

- Artillerie-Kommandeur 17
  - Großherzoglich Mecklenburgisches Feldartillerie-Regiment Nr. 60
  - I.Bataillon/Fußartillerie-Regiment Nr. 24
- Pionier-Bataillon Nr. 126
- Divisions-Nachrichten-Kommandeur 17
