= IX Corps (German Empire) =

IX Army Corps IX. Armee-Korps
- Flag of the Staff of a Generalkommando (1871–1918)
- Active: 30 October 1866–1919
- Country: Prussia/German Empire
- Type: Corps
- Size: c. 44,000 (on mobilisation in 1914)
- Garrison/HQ: Altona/Palmaille-Straße 67
- Shoulder strap piping: White
- Engagements: Franco-Prussian War Battle of Gravelotte Second Battle of Orléans (1870) Battle of Le Mans World War I Battle of the Frontiers Battle of Mons First Battle of the Marne Battle of Pozières Battle of Amiens (1918)

Insignia
- Abbreviation: IX AK

The IX Army Corps / IX AK (German: IX. Armee-Korps) was a corps level command of the Prussian and Armies before and during the First World War.

IX Corps was one of three formed in the aftermath of the Austro-Prussian War (the others being X Corps and XI Corps). The Corps was formed in October 1866 with headquarters in Altona. The catchment area included the newly annexed Province of Schleswig-Holstein, the Grand Duchies of Mecklenburg-Schwerin and Mecklenburg-Strelitz and the Hanseatic cities of Lübeck, Hamburg and Bremen.

During the Franco-Prussian War IX Corps was assigned to the 2nd Army. The Corps was assigned to the III Army Inspectorate but joined the 1st Army at the start of the First World War. It was still in existence at the end of the war. The Corps was disbanded with the demobilisation of the German Army after the First World War.

== Franco-Prussian War ==
During the Franco-Prussian War, the corps formed part of the 2nd Army. The 17th Division was initially part of the reserve of the Prussian Army, the 18th Division was joined by the Grand Ducal Hessian (25th) Division. The Corps participated in the battles of Gravelotte, Orléans and Le Mans.

== Flags of the Line Infantry regiments ==
Due to the large number of Line Infantry regiments then in existence, on 18 December 1890, Kaiser Wilhelm II ordered that the flag colours were to be the same as that of the uniform epaulettes. This was to ensure that each corps attained uniformity. IX and X Corps wore white epaulettes. Notwithstanding this, the flags of the Jäger Battalions would be green.

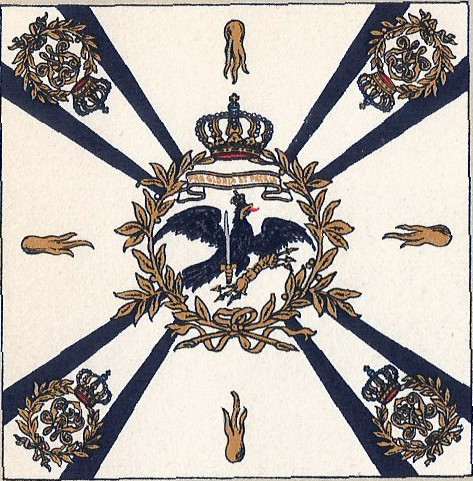
Flag of the Line Infantry regiments of the IX and X Corps (except Jägers)

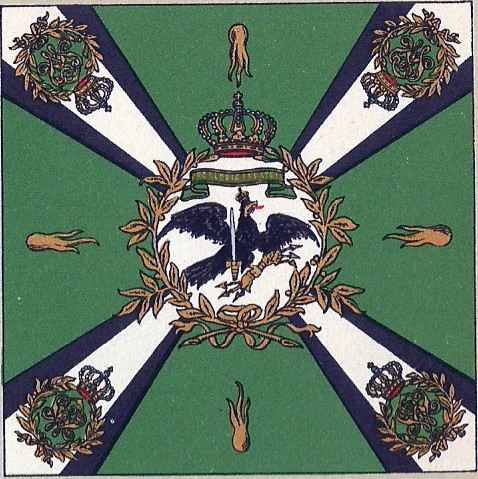
Flag of the Jägers Battalion

== Peacetime organisation ==
The 25 peacetime Corps of the German Army (Guards, I - XXI, I - III Bavarian) had a reasonably standardised organisation. Each consisted of two divisions with usually two infantry brigades, one field artillery brigade and a cavalry brigade each. Each brigade normally consisted of two regiments of the appropriate type, so each Corps normally commanded 8 infantry, 4 field artillery and 4 cavalry regiments. There were exceptions to this rule:

V, VI, VII, IX and XIV Corps each had a 5th infantry brigade (so 10 infantry regiments)
II, XIII, XVIII and XXI Corps had a 9th infantry regiment
I, VI and XVI Corps had a 3rd cavalry brigade (so 6 cavalry regiments)
the Guards Corps had 11 infantry regiments (in 5 brigades) and 8 cavalry regiments (in 4 brigades).

Each Corps also directly controlled a number of other units. This could include one or more

Foot Artillery Regiment
Jäger Battalion
Pioneer Battalion
Train Battalion

Peacetime organization of the Corps
Corps	Division	Brigade	Units	Garrison
IX Corps	17th Division	33rd Infantry Brigade	75th (1st Hanseatic)(Bremen) Infantry	Bremen, III Bn at Stade
IX Corps	17th Division	33rd Infantry Brigade	76th (2nd Hanseatic)(Hamburg) Infantry	Hamburg
IX Corps	17th Division	34th Infantry Brigade	89th (Grand Ducal Mecklenburgian) Grenadiers	Schwerin, II Bn at Neustrelitz
IX Corps	17th Division	34th Infantry Brigade	90th (Grand Ducal Mecklenburgian) Fusiliers "Emperor William"	Rostock, II Bn at Wismar
IX Corps	17th Division	81st Infantry Brigade	162nd (3rd Hanseatic)(Lübeck) Infantry	Lübeck, II Bn at Eutin
IX Corps	17th Division	81st Infantry Brigade	163rd (Schleswig-Holstein) Infantry	Neumünster, III Bn at Heide
IX Corps	17th Division	17th Field Artillery Brigade	24th (Holstein) Field Artillery	Güstrow, Neustrelitz
IX Corps	17th Division	17th Field Artillery Brigade	60th (Grand Ducal Mecklenburgian) Field Artillery	Schwerin
IX Corps	17th Division	17th Cavalry Brigade	17th (1st Grand Ducal Mecklenburgian) Dragoons	Ludwigslust
IX Corps	17th Division	17th Cavalry Brigade	18th (2nd Grand Ducal Mecklenburgian) Dragoons	Parchim
IX Corps	18th Division	35th Infantry Brigade	84th (Schleswig) Infantry "von Manstein"	Schleswig, Hadersleben
IX Corps	18th Division	35th Infantry Brigade	86th (Schleswig-Holstein) Fusiliers "Queen"	Flensburg, III Bn at Sonderburg
IX Corps	18th Division	36th Infantry Brigade	31st (1st Thuringian) Infantry "Count Bose"	Altona
IX Corps	18th Division	36th Infantry Brigade	85th (Holstein) Infantry "Duke of Holstein"	Rendsburg, III Bn at Kiel
IX Corps	18th Division	18th Field Artillery Brigade	9th (Schleswig) Field Artillery "General Field Marshal Graf Waldersee"	Itzehoe
IX Corps	18th Division	18th Field Artillery Brigade	45th (Lauenburg) Field Artillery	Altona, Rendsburg
IX Corps	18th Division	18th Cavalry Brigade	15th (Hannover) Hussars "Queen Wilhelmina of the Netherlands"	Wandsbek
IX Corps	18th Division	18th Cavalry Brigade	16th (Schleswig-Holstein) Hussars "Emperor Francis Joseph of Austria, King of Hungary"	Schleswig
IX Corps	Corps Troops		9th (Lauenburg) Jäger Battalion	Ratzeburg
IX Corps	Corps Troops		20th (Lauenburg) Foot Artillery	Altona
IX Corps	Corps Troops		9th (Schleswig-Holstein) Pioneer Battalion	Harburg
IX Corps	Corps Troops		9th (Schleswig-Holstein) Train Battalion	Rendsburg
IX Corps	Altona Defence Command (Landwehr-Inspektion)			Altona

== World War I ==
=== Organisation on mobilisation ===
On mobilization on 2 August 1914 the Corps was restructured. 17th and 18th Cavalry Brigades were withdrawn to form part of the 4th Cavalry Division. The 16th Dragoons, formerly of the X Corps, was raised to a strength of 6 squadrons before being split into two half-regiments of 3 squadrons each. The half-regiments were assigned as divisional cavalry to 17th Division and the 18th Division. The 81st Infantry Brigade was transferred to 17th Reserve Division in IX Reserve Corps. Divisions received engineer companies and other support units from the Corps headquarters. In summary, IX Corps mobilised with 25 infantry battalions, 9 machine gun companies (54 machine guns), 6 cavalry squadrons, 24 field artillery batteries (144 guns), 4 heavy artillery batteries (16 guns), 3 pioneer companies and an aviation detachment.

Initial wartime organization of the Corps
Corps	Division	Brigade	Units
IX Corps	17th Division	33rd Infantry Brigade	75th Infantry Regiment
IX Corps	17th Division	33rd Infantry Brigade	76th Infantry Regiment
IX Corps	17th Division	34th Infantry Brigade	89th Grenadier Regiment
IX Corps	17th Division	34th Infantry Brigade	90th Fusilier Regiment
IX Corps	17th Division	34th Infantry Brigade	9th Jäger Battalion (Note: With a machine gun company.)
IX Corps	17th Division	17th Field Artillery Brigade	24th Field Artillery Regiment
IX Corps	17th Division	17th Field Artillery Brigade	60th Field Artillery Regiment
IX Corps	17th Division		staff and half of 16th Dragoon Regiment
IX Corps	17th Division		1st Company, 9th Pioneer Battalion
IX Corps	17th Division		17th Divisional Pontoon Train
IX Corps	17th Division		1st Medical Company
IX Corps	17th Division		3rd Medical Company
IX Corps	18th Division	35th Infantry Brigade	84th Infantry Regiment
IX Corps	18th Division	35th Infantry Brigade	86th Fusilier Regiment
IX Corps	18th Division	36th Infantry Brigade	31st Infantry Regiment
IX Corps	18th Division	36th Infantry Brigade	85th Infantry Regiment
IX Corps	18th Division	18th Field Artillery Brigade	9th Field Artillery Regiment
IX Corps	18th Division	18th Field Artillery Brigade	45th Field Artillery Regiment
IX Corps	18th Division		half of 16th Dragoon Regiment
IX Corps	18th Division		2nd Company, 9th Pioneer Battalion
IX Corps	18th Division		3rd Company, 9th Pioneer Battalion
IX Corps	18th Division		18th Divisional Pontoon Train
IX Corps	18th Division		2nd Medical Company
IX Corps	Corps Troops		I Battalion, 20th Foot Artillery Regiment (Note: 4 heavy artillery batteries (16 heavy field howitzers))
IX Corps	Corps Troops		11th Aviation Detachment
IX Corps	Corps Troops		9th Corps Pontoon Train
IX Corps	Corps Troops		9th Telephone Detachment
IX Corps	Corps Troops		9th Pioneer Searchlight Section
IX Corps	Corps Troops		Munition Trains and Columns corresponding to II Corps

=== Combat chronicle ===
On mobilisation, IX Corps was assigned to the 1st Army on the right wing of the forces for the Schlieffen Plan offensive in August 1914 on the Western Front. It participated in the Battle of Mons and the First Battle of the Marne which marked the end of the German advances in 1914. Later it saw action in the Battle of Pozières and Battle of Amiens (1918).

It was still in existence at the end of the war.

== Commanders ==
The IX Corps had the following commanders during its existence:

From	Rank	Name
30 October 1866	General der Infanterie	Edwin Freiherr von Manteuffel
26 January 1867	General der Infanterie	Albrecht Gustav von Manstein
23 September 1873	General der Infanterie	Hermann von Tresckow
2 August 1888	General der Infanterie	Paul von Leszczynski
2 February 1891	General der Kavallerie	Alfred Graf von Waldersee
5 April 1898	General der Kavallerie	Robert von Massow
29 October 1903	Generalleutnant	Friedrich von Bock und Polach
21 May 1907	General der Kavallerie	Hermann Freiherr von Vietinghoff genannt Scheel
12 April 1910	General der Infanterie	Karl Freiherr von Plettenberg
1 March 1913	General der Infanterie	Ferdinand von Quast
24 January 1917	Generalleutnant	Horst Ritter und Edler von Oetinger

== See also ==
- Franco-Prussian War order of battle
- German Army order of battle (1914)
- List of Imperial German infantry regiments
- List of Imperial German artillery regiments
- List of Imperial German cavalry regiments
- Order of battle at Mons
- Order of battle of the First Battle of the Marne

== Bibliography ==
- Cron, Hermann (2002) [1937]. Imperial German Army 1914−18: Organisation, Structure, Orders-of-Battle. Helion & Co. ISBN 1-874622-70-1.
- Haythornthwaite, Philip J. (1996). The World War One Source Book. London: Arms and Armour. ISBN 1-85409-351-7.
- Lezius, Martin (1935). Fahnen und Standarten der alten preußischen Armee nach dem Stande vom 1. August 1914 [Flags and standards of the old Prussian army as of 1 August 1914] (in German). Stuttgart: Frankh'sche Verlagsbuchhandlung. OCLC 246401265.
- The German Forces in the Field; 7th Revision, 11th November 1918; Compiled by the General Staff, War Office. Imperial War Museum, London and the Battery Press. 1995 [1918]. ISBN 978-1-870423-95-3.
