= Twenty-eighth of the month =

Recurring ordinal calendar date

The twenty-eighth of the month or twenty-eighth day of the month is the recurring calendar date position corresponding to the day numbered 28 of each month. In the Gregorian calendar (and other calendars that number days sequentially within a month), this day occurs in every month of the year, and therefore occurs twelve times per year. Because the month of February only has 28 days outside of leap years, this is the highest day number that appears on the calendar in every month of every year.

- Twenty-eighth of January
- Twenty-eighth of February
- Twenty-eighth of March
- Twenty-eighth of April
- Twenty-eighth of May
- Twenty-eighth of June
- Twenty-eighth of July
- Twenty-eighth of August
- Twenty-eighth of September
- Twenty-eighth of October
- Twenty-eighth of November
- Twenty-eighth of December

In addition to these dates, this date occurs in months of many other calendars, such as the Bengali calendar and the Hebrew calendar.

== See also ==
- 28th (disambiguation)
