= 18th Division (German Empire) =

18th Division (18. Division); in 1870–71 and from August 2, 1914, 18th Infantry Division (18. Infanterie-Division)
- Active: 1866–1919
- Country: Prussia/Germany
- Branch: Army
- Type: Infantry (in peacetime included cavalry)
- Size: Approx. 15,000
- Part of: IX. Army Corps (IX. Armeekorps)
- Garrison/HQ: Flensburg
- Engagements: Franco-Prussian War: Colombey, Gravelotte, Metz, Noiseville, 2nd Orléans, Le Mans; World War I: Liège, Great Retreat, 1st Marne, 1st Aisne, Somme, Arras, Passchendaele, German spring offensive, Hundred Days Offensive

The 18th Division (18. Division) was a unit of the Prussian/German Army. It was formed on October 11, 1866, and was headquartered in Flensburg. The division was subordinated in peacetime to the IX Army Corps (IX. Armeekorps). The division was disbanded in 1919 during the demobilization of the German Army after World War I. The division was recruited primarily in Schleswig-Holstein.

== Combat chronicle ==
In the Franco-Prussian War of 1870–71, the 18th Infantry Division saw action in the battles of Colombey and Gravelotte and in the Siege of Metz. After the Battle of Noiseville, the division entered the Loire campaign, fighting in the battles of 2nd Orléans, Beaugency-Cravant, and Le Mans.

During the opening phases of World War I, the 18th Infantry Division participated in the Battle of Liège, the Allied Great Retreat, the First Battle of the Marne, and the First Battle of the Aisne. In 1916, it saw action in the Somme, and in 1917 it was involved in the Battles of Arras and Passchendaele. In 1918, it participated in the German spring offensive and the subsequent Allied counteroffensives, including the Hundred Days Offensive. Allied intelligence rated it a first class division.

== Order of battle in the Franco-Prussian War ==
During wartime, the 18th Division, like other regular German divisions, was redesignated an infantry division. The organization of the 18th Infantry Division in 1870 at the beginning of the Franco-Prussian War was as follows:

- 35. Infanterie-Brigade
  - Infanterie-Regiment Nr. 25
  - Infanterie-Regiment Nr. 84
- 36. Infanterie-Brigade
  - Grenadier-Regiment Nr. 11
  - Infanterie-Regiment Nr. 85
- Jäger-Bataillon Nr. 9
- Dragoner-Regiment Nr. 6

== Pre-World War I organization ==
German divisions underwent various organizational changes after the Franco-Prussian War. The organization of the 18th Division in 1914, shortly before the outbreak of World War I, was as follows:

- 35. Infanterie-Brigade
  - Infanterie-Regiment von Manstein (Schleswigsches) Nr. 84
  - Füsilier-Regiment Königin (Schleswig-Holsteinisches) Nr. 86
- 36. Infanterie-Brigade
  - Infanterie-Regiment Graf Bose (1. Thüringisches) Nr. 31
  - Infanterie-Regiment Herzog von Holstein (Holsteinisches) Nr. 85
- 18. Kavallerie-Brigade:
  - Husaren-Regiment Königin Wilhelmina der Niederlande (Hannoversches) Nr. 15
  - Husaren-Regiment Kaiser Franz Joseph von Österreich, König von Ungarn (Schleswig-Holsteinisches) Nr. 16
- 18. Feldartillerie-Brigade:
  - Feldartillerie-Regiment General-Feldmarschall Graf Waldersee (Schleswigsches) Nr. 9
  - Lauenburgisches Feldartillerie-Regiment Nr. 45
- Landwehr-Inspektion Altona

== Order of battle on mobilization ==
On mobilization in August 1914 at the beginning of World War I, most divisional cavalry, including brigade headquarters, was withdrawn to form cavalry divisions or split up among divisions as reconnaissance units. Divisions received engineer companies and other support units from their higher headquarters. The 18th Division was again renamed the 18th Infantry Division. The 18th Infantry Division's initial wartime organization was as follows:

- 35. Infanterie-Brigade
  - Infanterie-Regiment von Manstein (Schleswigsches) Nr. 84
  - Füsilier-Regiment Königin (Schleswig-Holsteinisches) Nr. 86
- 36. Infanterie-Brigade
  - Infanterie-Regiment Graf Bose (1. Thüringisches) Nr. 31
  - Infanterie-Regiment Herzog von Holstein (Holsteinisches) Nr. 85
- 3. Eskadron/2. Hannoversches Dragoner-Regiment Nr. 16
- 18. Feldartillerie-Brigade:
  - Feldartillerie-Regiment General-Feldmarschall Graf Waldersee (Schleswigsches) Nr. 9
  - Lauenburgisches Feldartillerie-Regiment Nr. 45
- 2. Kompanie/Schleswig-Holsteinisches Pionier-Bataillon Nr. 9
- 3. Kompanie/Schleswig-Holsteinisches Pionier-Bataillon Nr. 9

== Late World War I organization ==
Divisions underwent many changes during the war, with regiments moving from division to division, and some being destroyed and rebuilt. During the war, most divisions became triangular - one infantry brigade with three infantry regiments rather than two infantry brigades of two regiments (a "square division"). An artillery commander replaced the artillery brigade headquarters, the cavalry was further reduced, the engineer contingent was increased, and a divisional signals command was created. The 18th Infantry Division's order of battle on March 8, 1918, was as follows:

- 36. Infanterie-Brigade
  - Infanterie-Regiment Graf Bose (1. Thüringisches) Nr. 31
  - Infanterie-Regiment Herzog von Holstein (Holsteinisches) Nr. 85
  - Füsilier-Regiment Königin (Schleswig-Holsteinisches) Nr. 86
  - Maschinengewehr-Scharfschützen-Abteilung Nr. 48
- 2.Eskadron/2. Hannoversches Dragoner-Regiment Nr. 16
- Artillerie-Kommandeur 18
  - Lauenburgisches Feldartillerie-Regiment Nr. 45
  - II.Bataillon/Fußartillerie-Regiment Nr. 28
- Stab Schleswig-Holsteinisches Pionier-Bataillon Nr. 9
  - 2. Kompanie/Schleswig-Holsteinisches Pionier-Bataillon Nr. 9
  - 3. Kompanie/Schleswig-Holsteinisches Pionier-Bataillon Nr. 9
  - Minenwerfer-Kompanie Nr. 18
- Divisions-Nachrichten-Kommandeur 18
