= 28 Squadron =

28 Squadron may refer to:

- No. 28 Squadron PAF, Pakistan Air Force
- No. 28 Squadron, Royal Air Force
- No. 28 Squadron, Royal Australian Air Force
- 28 Squadron, South African Air Force
