= 28 =

28 or Twenty-eight may refer to:

- 28 (number), the natural number following 27 and preceding 29.
- one of the years 28 BC, AD 28, 1928, 2028

== Films ==
- 28 (2014 film), a Sri Lankan feature drama
- 28 (2019 film), an Indian Malayalam-language film

== Songs and albums ==
- 28 (album), by Aoki Takamasa and Tujiko Noriko, 2005
- "28" (song), by Zach Bryan, 2024
- "28", by Agust D from D-2, 2020
- "Twenty Eight" (song), by The Weeknd, 2011
- "Twenty Eight", by Karma to Burn from Wild, Wonderful Purgatory, 1999

== Science ==
- Nickel, a transition metal in the periodic table with atomic number 28
- 28 Bellona, an asteroid in the asteroid belt

== Other uses ==
- 28 (book), a 2007 non-fiction book by Stephanie Nolen
- Twenty-eight (card game), an Indian trick-taking game for four players
- Twenty-eight, a nickname for the subspecies (Barnardius zonarius semitorquatus) of the Australian ringneck
- Toyota-28, a boat made by Toyota and Yanmar
- "28", a clothing brand by English singer Louis Tomlinson

== See also ==
- 28th (disambiguation)
