= Battle of Le Mans =

Battle during the Franco-Prussian War of 1871

Coordinates: 48.0042°N 0.1969°E

- Part of the Franco-Prussian War
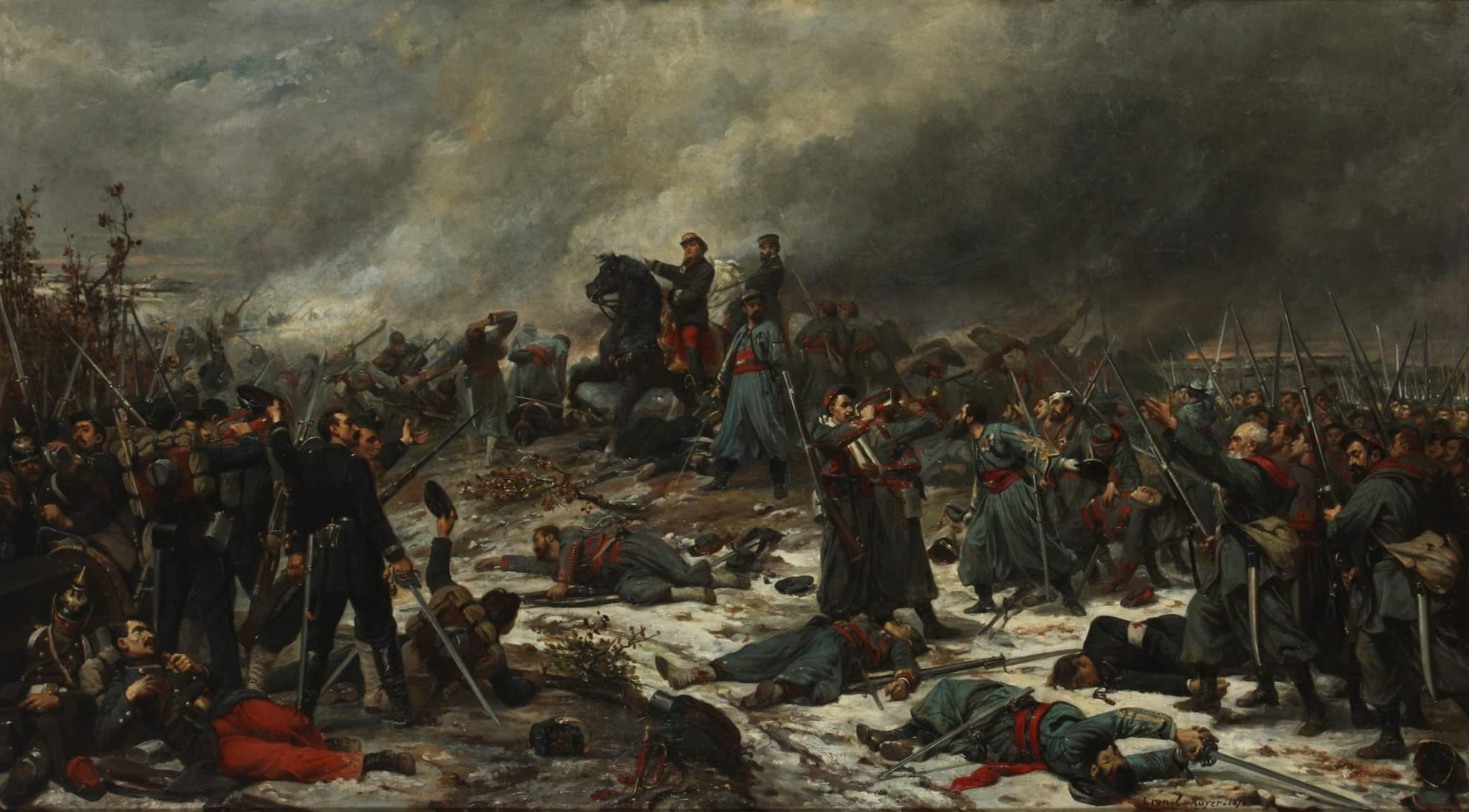
- Battle of Le Mans by Lionel Royer
Date	10–12 January 1871
Location	Le Mans, France
Result	German victory

Belligerents
North German Confederation: Prussia	French Republic

Commanders and leaders
(North German Confederation) Prince Friedrich Karl (North German Confederation) Frederick Francis II	(French Third Republic) Antoine Chanzy

Units involved
Second Army	Armée de la Loire

Strength
73,000; 324 guns	88,000

Casualties and losses
3,500 killed or wounded 500 captured	6,000 killed or wounded 20,000 captured or missing 17 guns 2 colours

The Battle of Le Mans was a German victory during the Franco-Prussian War that ended French resistance in western France.

== Background ==
After capturing the armies of the French Empire at Sedan and Metz in the fall of 1870, the German armies under the command of Helmuth von Moltke besieged Paris in September 1870. The newly-formed French Third Republic rejected a German peace offer and decided to continue the war and raise fresh armies to defeat the Germans.

The first French attempt to relieve Paris was defeated by the Germans at Orléans from 2 to 4 December by Prince Friedrich Karl of Prussia's Second Army. After a second defeat at Beaugency on 10 December, General Antoine Chanzy's poorly supplied Armée de la Loire retreated undisturbed west to Le Mans on 15 December. Friedrich Karl's army was at the limits of its lines of communications and subject to franc-tireur attacks. His cavalry could not pursue along the icy roads. The war was also taking its toll on the Germans, with much of the Prince's infantry by now being composed of inexperienced recruits unaccustomed to long marches. Two days later Moltke confirmed the order to not pursue.

The retreat to Le Mans through the muddy and hilly terrain proved disastrous for the French army. Thousands of soldiers deserted, clogging the roads or hiding in the forests. Lack of paved roads resulted in entire convoys getting immobilized along the way. The force that arrived in Le Mans was exhausted from the poor march organization and constant defeats.

Le Mans had rail lines to Nantes, Brest and Paris and thus provided the French with lines of retreat. Chanzy began to prepare the city for the defensive. The city had no significant geographical or fortified defenses and Chanzy's maintenance of his position was dependent on German supply difficulties south of Paris. The German General Staff was able to overcome these deficiencies and prepare Friedrick Karl's army for an offensive to destroy the Armée de la Loire.

=== German situation ===
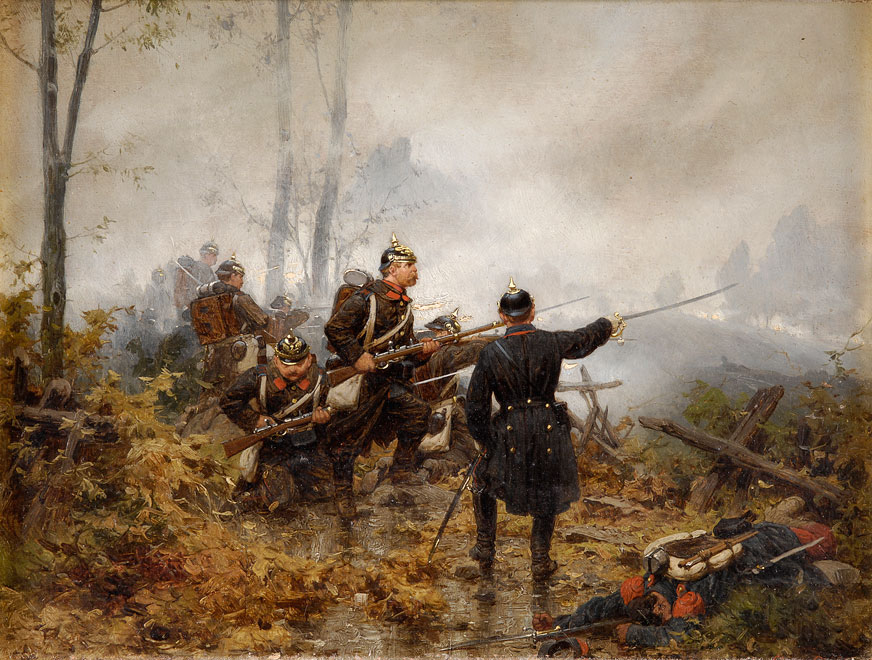
The 17th (4th Westphalian) Infantry Regiment at Le Mans by Christian Sell

Moltke observed the French attempts to reform their defeated armies and decided to finish them off before they could do so. With the benefit of the improved supply situation, on 1 January 1871 he ordered Friedrich Karl to advance west between Vendôme and Chartres and destroy Chanzy's forces.

=== French situation ===
Chanzy submitted plans to the Government of National Defense for another attack on the German siege army at Paris. The government persuaded him to wait until the second week of January, when two new army corps would have been raised at Cherbourg and Vierzon. The French plan was to inflict as much attrition as possible on the Germans to soften their peace terms.

Chanzy sent a division-sized column under General Alphonse Jouffroy to harass the German Second Army, while the rest of his 88,000-strong army dug in. Jouffroy ambushed two German battalions on 27 December at Troo but the Germans fought their way out. The French column then attacked the German position in the town of Vendôme on 31 December but was defeated. Jouffroy prepared for another attack on 5 January that ran headlong onto Friedrich Karl's offensive.

== Prelude ==
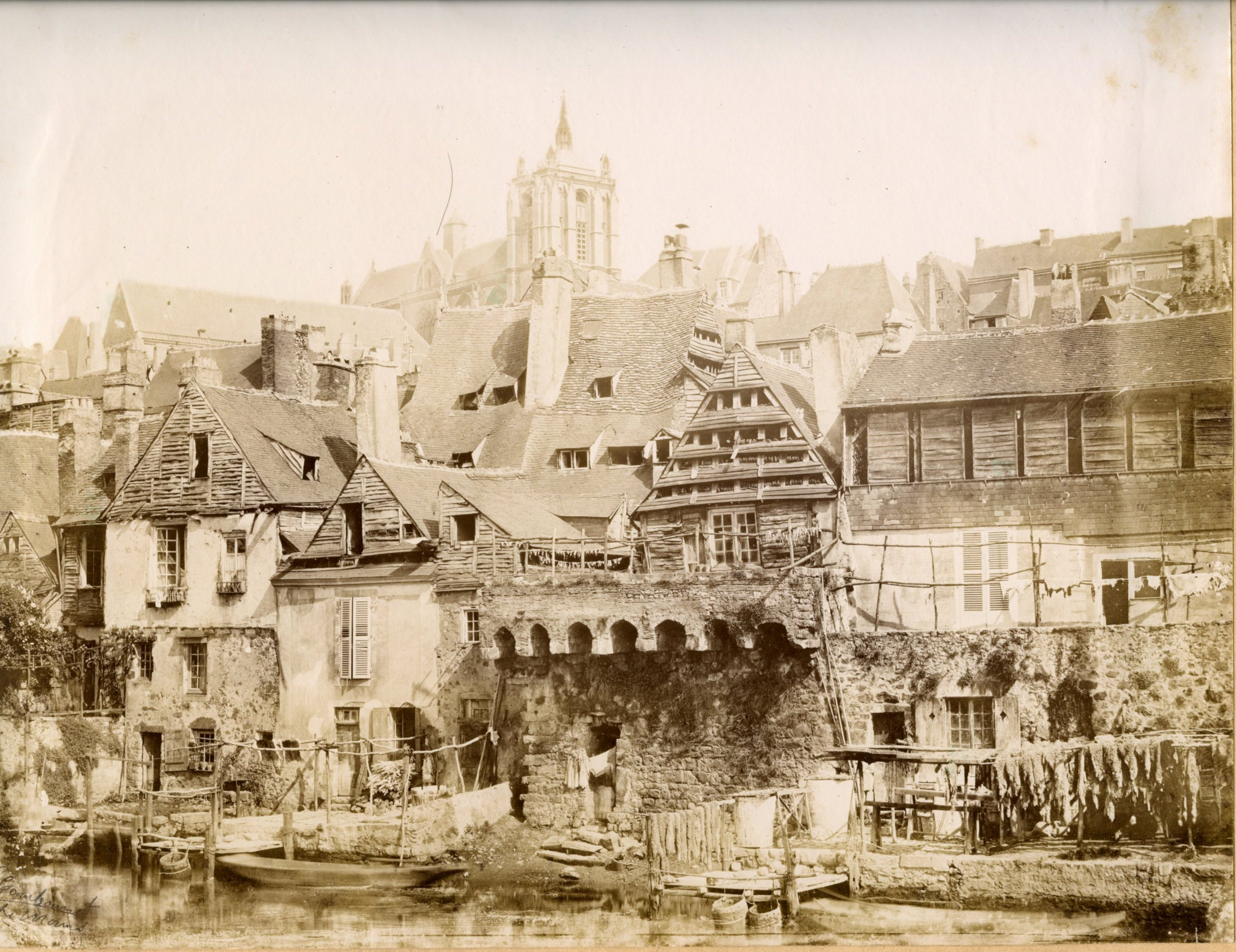
Tanners' quarter, Le Mans c. 1900

Friedrich Karl arranged his army on a broad arc to encircle the French at Le Mans and began the offensive on 6 January. The Württembergian XIII Corps under the Grand Duke of Mecklenburg advanced on the right flank along the river Huisne. X Corps under General Konstantin Bernhard von Voigts-Rhetz covered the left flank by advancing down the Loir. In the center, III Corps and IX Corps followed each other down the main road to Le Mans.

The Germans defeated Jouffroy's attack and pursued his retreating men west, using the same routes as Chanzy's army had done weeks before. French delaying tactics and the difficult terrain did not prevent the Germans from advancing 50 miles in six days. Chanzy was angered by the speed of the German offensive and on 8 January gave his most trusted lieutenant, Admiral Bernard Jauréguiberry, command over the forward columns to shore up their retreat. The advance of the German X Corps was halted for the day. The two German corps in the center continued to push forward with little opposition and on 9 January Chanzy sent a division to check them at Ardenay. The French held their positions in the snow until nightfall. These delaying actions could not stop the Germans and on 10 January Chanzy launched a general counter-attack to buy time for his defensive preparations in Le Mans.

== The battle ==
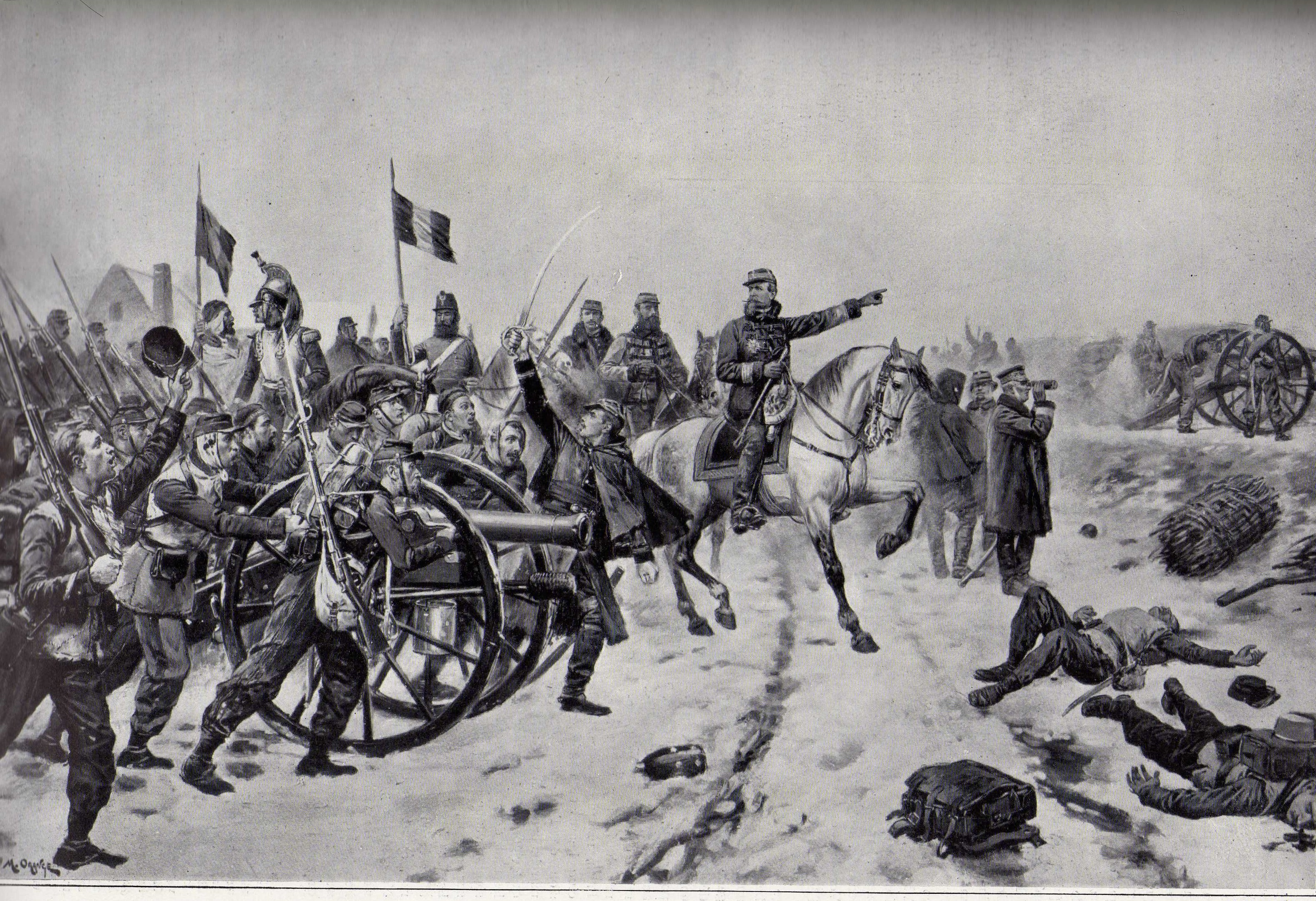
General Chanzy at the battle of Mans by Maurice Orange

The French army was greatly demoralized and ill-equipped. Much of the French ammunition had been soaked in the rain giving the Prussians a major advantage against the obsolete French gunnery. But Chanzy still ordered his forces into trenches prepared before Le Mans. The Germans hit the French left flank guarded by the river Huisne. The flank was turned and nearly routed until artillery and a counterattack halted the German attack. A bold German attack was launched and overwhelmed the French right flank. Jauréguiberry attempted to rally the broken troops to mount a counterattack but failed to do so. The French defense dissolved, the stragglers falling back into Le Mans.

== Aftermath ==
The battle had completely ended French resistance in the west. Friedrich Karl's supply lines were stretched thin and his army also was so exhausted from its campaign along the river Loire that he did not pursue Chanzy. The French retreated first to Alençon and then to Laval on 13 January. Chanzy continued to plan further attacks but his hungry and fatigued army was incapable of offensive action and the fighting around the Loire came to an end.

=== Casualties ===
More than 25,000 Frenchmen were killed, wounded or captured. 20,000 soldiers deserted during and after the battle. Friedrich Karl noted German casualties of 3,000 men in his diary. Bodart estimates German casualties as 3,500 killed or wounded and 500 captured.
