= 28th Street =

28th Street may refer to:

== New York City Subway stations ==
- 28th Street station (IRT Broadway–Seventh Avenue Line), serving the 1 and 2 trains
- 28th Street station (BMT Broadway Line), serving the N, Q, R, and W trains
- 28th Street station (IRT Lexington Avenue Line), serving the 4, 6, and <6> trains
- 28th Street station (IRT Sixth Avenue Line) (demolished)
- 28th Street station (IRT Third Avenue Line) (demolished)

== Other uses ==
- M-11 (Michigan highway), a highway also known as 28th Street in the Grand Rapids metropolitan area

== See also ==
- The 28th Street Crew, a house-music group
