= 34th Brigade Royal Field Artillery =

British Army regiment

XXXIV Brigade, Royal Field Artillery was a brigade (Note: The basic organic unit of the Royal Artillery was, and is, the Battery. When grouped together they formed brigades, in the same way that infantry battalions or cavalry regiments were grouped together in brigades. At the outbreak of World War I, a field artillery brigade of headquarters (4 officers, 37 other ranks), three batteries (5 and 193 each), and a brigade ammunition column (4 and 154) had a total strength just under 800 so was broadly comparable to an infantry battalion (just over 1,000) or a cavalry regiment (about 550). Like an infantry battalion, an artillery brigade was usually commanded by a Lieutenant-Colonel. Artillery brigades were redesignated as regiments in 1938.) of the Royal Field Artillery which served in the First World War.

It was originally formed with 22nd, 50th and 70th Batteries, and attached to 2nd Infantry Division. On 5 August 1914, it was mobilised and was sent to the Continent with the British Expeditionary Force, where it saw service with 2nd Division until 1917. It went to France commanded by Lt Col H G Sandilands, with Capt H G Boone as adjutant, and Arthur Stoyle as RSM. 22nd Battery was commanded by Major H T Wynter; 50th Battery by Major T O Seagram; 70th Battery by Major H C S Clarke; the newly formed Ammunition Column was commanded by Captain D Stewart.

22nd Battery left the Brigade to Feb 1915, joining 3rd Brigade RFA in 28th Division (later serving on the Salonika front). 56th (Howitzer) Battery joined the brigade in May 1916, when the Ammunition Column moved to be part of 2nd DAC. In November 1916 521st Howitzer Battery joined the Brigade from England, briefly serving as D/34th.

On 25 January 1917, 34th Brigade left 2nd Division to become an army-level artillery brigade; D/34th was broken up - a section joining D/36th Brigade and the other 47/41st Brigade, its men remaining with 2nd Division. A new C/34th was added, previously A/60th Brigade RFA, and a new Brigade Ammunition Column under Captain C H Putnam.

In November 1918 34th Army Brigade RFA was serving with Third Army, still with 50th Bty, 70th Bty, C/34th and 56th (Howitzer) Bty.
