= 28th Brigade Royal Field Artillery =

XXVIII Brigade, Royal Field Artillery was a brigade (Note: The basic organic unit of the Royal Artillery was, and is, the Battery. When grouped together they formed brigades, in the same way that infantry battalions or cavalry regiments were grouped together in brigades. At the outbreak of World War I, a field artillery brigade of headquarters (4 officers, 37 other ranks), three batteries (5 and 193 each), and a brigade ammunition column (4 and 154) had a total strength just under 800 so was broadly comparable to an infantry battalion (just over 1,000) or a cavalry regiment (about 550). Like an infantry battalion, an artillery brigade was usually commanded by a Lieutenant-Colonel. Artillery brigades were redesignated as regiments in 1938.) of the Royal Field Artillery which served in the First World War.

It was originally formed in 1900, with 122nd, 123rd and 124th Batteries, and attached to 5th Infantry Division. In August 1914 it mobilised and was sent to the Continent with the British Expeditionary Force, where it saw service throughout the war.

It received a fourth battery - 65th (Howitzer) Battery - in May 1916, and in January 1917 was withdrawn from the division to be used as an army-level brigade. After the close of hostilities it spent a short time as part of the occupation force in Germany, and then saw service in Turkey from 1919 to 1921. After returning to England in 1921, it was demobilised.

The brigade was reactivated in 1922 by the redesignation of 37th Brigade Royal Field Artillery, with 1st, 3rd and 5th Batteries, and retitled 28th Field Brigade Royal Artillery in 1924.

In 1938, the regiment was redesignated to become 28th Field Regiment Royal Artillery.
