= Battle of Orléans (December 1870) =

Franco-Prussian War, 3-4 Dec 1870

Coordinates: 47.9025°N 1.9090°E

Second Battle of Orléans
- Part of the Franco-Prussian War
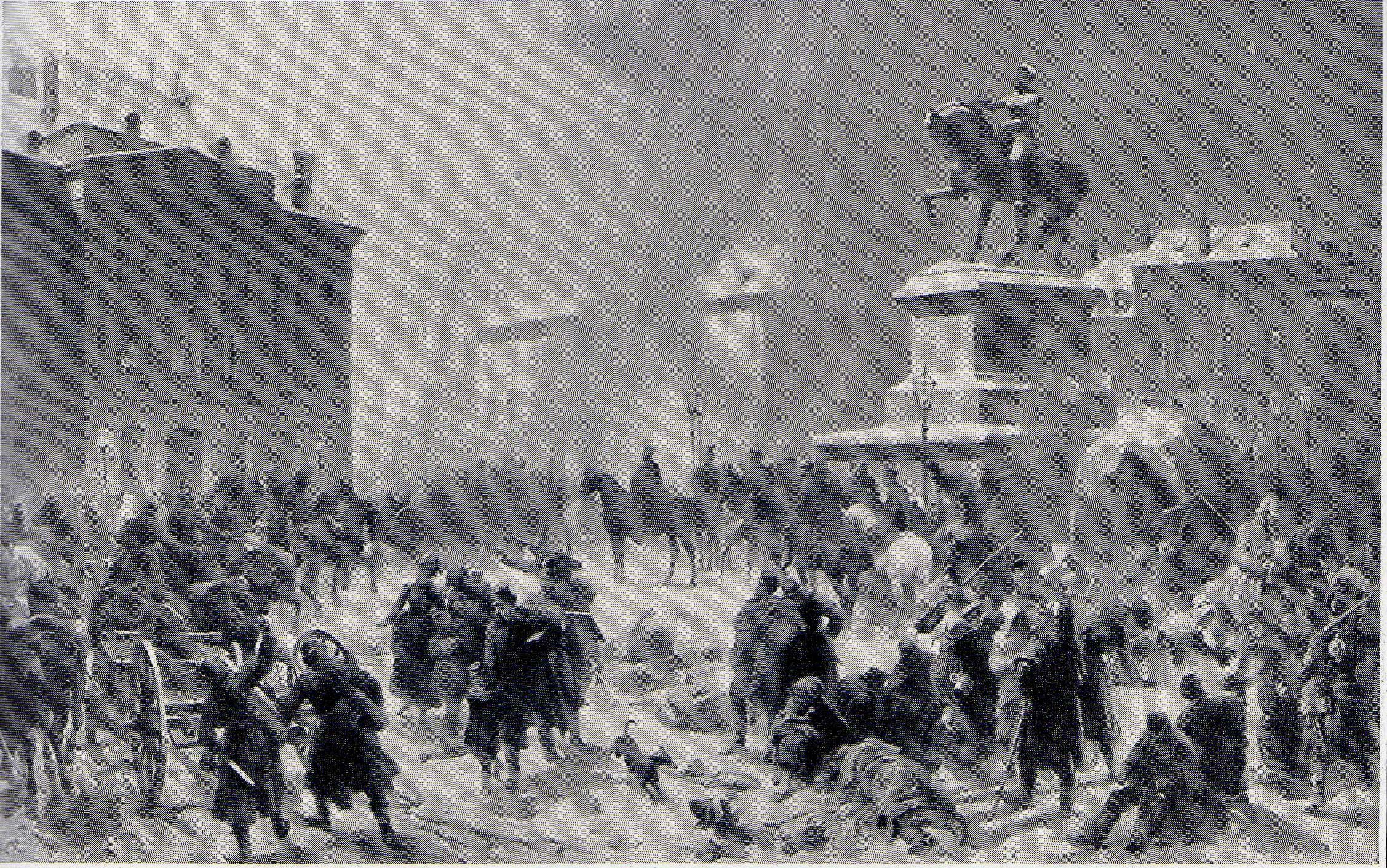
- German troops enter Orléans on 4 December 1870
Date	3–4 December 1870
Location	Orléans, France
Result	German victory

Belligerents
North German Confederation: Kingdom of Prussia; Bavaria	(French Third Republic) France

Commanders and leaders
(North German Confederation) Friedrich Karl (North German Confederation) Frederick Francis II (Kingdom of Bavaria) Ludwig von der Tann	(French Third Republic) Louis d'Aurelle de Paladines

Strength
86,000	62,000

Casualties and losses
400 killed 1,600 wounded	3,000 killed or wounded 18,000 captured or missing 74 guns and 4 gunboats captured

The Second Battle of Orléans of Battle of Vaumainbert was fought during the Franco-Prussian War of 1870. It took place on December 3 and 4, 1870 and was part of the Loire Campaign. The Germans recaptured Orléans, which had been retaken by the French on November 11, 1870 after the Battle of Coulmiers, and divided the French Army of the Loire in two. Future king of Serbia, Peter, took part in the battle on the French side. The French lost 20,000 men in two days of combat, including 18,000 captured or missing, as well as 74 guns and four gunboats. German manpower losses amounted to 2,000, of which 400 killed and 1,600 wounded. The Germans lost 368 horses, including 175 killed, 183 wounded and 10 missing.
