= 28th Battalion =

28th Battalion or 28th Infantry Battalion may refer to:

- 28th Battalion (Australia) — an Australian infantry battalion that served during the First World War
- 2/28th Battalion (Australia) — an Australian infantry battalion that served during the Second World War
- 28th Battalion (Northwest), CEF — a Canadian infantry battalion of the First World War
- 28th Battalion (ULFA) — a terrorist organisation in Assam
- Maori Battalion (28th Battalion) — a New Zealand infantry battalion that served during the Second World War
- 11th/28th Battalion, Royal Western Australia Regiment — a currently existing Australian Army Reserve infantry battalion
