= 28th Regiment =

28th Regiment may refer to:

== Infantry regiments ==
- 11th/28th Battalion, Royal Western Australia Regiment, a unit of the Australian Army
- 28th (North Gloucestershire) Regiment of Foot, a unit of the British Army
- 28th Punjabis, a unit of the British Army
- 28th Regiment "Pavia", a unit of the Italian Army
- 28th Infantry Regiment (United States), a unit of the United States Army
- 28th Marine Regiment (United States), a unit of the United States Marine Corps
- 28th Indiana Infantry Regiment (Colored), a unit of the United States Army
- 28th Arkansas Infantry Regiment, a unit of the United States Army
- 28th Tennessee Infantry Regiment, a unit of the United States Army
- 28th Connecticut Infantry Regiment, a unit of the United States Army
- 28th Regiment Massachusetts Volunteer Infantry, a unit of the United States Army
- 28th Regiment Kentucky Volunteer Infantry, a unit of the United States Army
- 28th Illinois Volunteer Infantry Regiment, a unit of the United States Army
- 28th Iowa Volunteer Infantry Regiment, a unit of the United States Army
- 28th Wisconsin Volunteer Infantry Regiment, a unit of the United States Army

== Cavalry regiments ==
- 28th Cavalry Regiment, a unit of the United States Army

== Engineering regiments ==
- 28 Engineer Regiment (United Kingdom), a unit of the British Army's Royal Engineers

== Artillery regiments ==
- 28th (Essex) Searchlight Regiment, Royal Artillery, a unit of the British Army's Royal Artillery
- 28th Field Artillery Regiment, a unit of the United States Army

== Aviation regiments ==
- 28th Guards Fighter Aviation Regiment, a unit of the Russian Air Force

== See also ==
- The 28th Regiment at Quatre Bras, an 1875 painting by Elizabeth Thompson
