= 20th Division (German Empire) =

20th Division (20. Division); in 1870-71 and from August 2, 1914, 20th Infantry Division (20. Infanterie-Division)
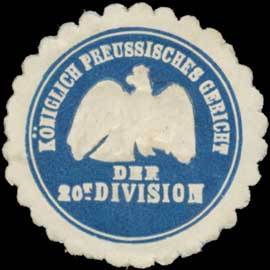
- Seal mark
- Active: 11 October 1866 – 1919
- Country: Prussia/German Empire
- Branch: Imperial German Army (1871-1919)
- Type: Triangular division
- Role: Infantry (in peacetime included cavalry)
- Size: Approx. 15,000
- Part of: X. Army Corps (X. Armeekorps)
- Garrison/HQ: Hannover
- Engagements: Franco-Prussian War: Battle of Mars-la-Tour; Battle of Gravelotte; Siege of Metz; Battle of Beaune-la-Rolande; Second Battle of Orléans; Battle of Le Mans; World War I: Western Front; Great Retreat; First Battle of St. Quentin; First Battle of the Marne; Battle of Passchendaele; German spring offensive; Eastern Front; Gorlice-Tarnów Offensive; Brusilov Offensive

The 20th Division (20. Division) was a unit of the Prussian/German Army. It was formed on October 11, 1866, and was headquartered in Hannover. The division was subordinated in peacetime to the X Army Corps (X. Armeekorps). The division was disbanded in 1919 during the demobilization of the German Army after World War I.

== Recruitment ==
During the Franco-Prussian War, the division was a mixed unit, with Hannoverian, Brunswick and Westphalian elements. It was subsequently reorganized so that it was recruited primarily from the former Kingdom of Hannover, which had become the Prussian Province of Hanover after 1866, along with the Duchy of Brunswick.

== Combat chronicle ==
During the Franco-Prussian War, the 20th Infantry Division fought in the battles of Mars-la-Tour and Gravelotte, and then in the Siege of Metz. It then fought in the Loire Campaign, including the battles of Beaune-la-Rolande, Orléans, Beaugency-Cravant, and Le Mans.

In World War I in 1914, the 20th Infantry Division fought in the Allied Great Retreat, including the Battle of St. Quentin and the First Battle of the Marne. It was sent to the Eastern Front in 1915 and again twice more, seeing action in the Gorlice-Tarnów Offensive and the Russian Brusilov Offensive. It returned to the Western Front and after a period in the trenches saw action in the Battle of Passchendaele and the German 1918 Spring Offensive. The division was rated a first class division by Allied intelligence.

== Order of battle in the Franco-Prussian War ==
During wartime, the 20th Division, like other regular German divisions, was redesignated an infantry division. The organization of the 20th Infantry Division in 1870 at the beginning of the Franco-Prussian War was as follows:

- 39. Infanterie-Brigade
  - Infanterie-Regiment Nr. 17
  - Infanterie-Regiment Nr. 56
- 40. Infanterie-Brigade
  - Infanterie-Regiment Nr. 70
  - Braunschweigisches Infanterie-Regiment Nr. 92
- Jäger-Bataillon Nr. 10
- Dragoner-Regiment Nr. 16

== Pre-World War I organization ==
German divisions underwent various organizational changes after the Franco-Prussian War. As noted above, the 20th Division was reorganized to become primarily a Hannover/Brunswick unit. The organization of the 20th Division in 1914, shortly before the outbreak of World War I, was as follows:

- 39. Infanterie-Brigade
  - Infanterie-Regiment von Voigts-Rhetz (3. Hannoversches) Nr. 79
  - 4. Hannoversches Infanterie-Regiment Nr. 164
- 40.Infanterie-Brigade
  - 2. Hannoversches Infanterie-Regiment Nr. 77
  - Braunschweigisches Infanterie-Regiment Nr. 92
- 20.Kavallerie-Brigade
  - 2. Hannoversches Dragoner-Regiment Nr. 16
  - Braunschweigisches Husaren-Regiment Nr. 17
- 20. Feldartillerie-Brigade
  - Feldartillerie-Regiment von Scharnhorst (1. Hannoversches) Nr. 10
  - Niedersächsisches Feldartillerie-Regiment Nr. 46
- Landwehr-Inspektion Hannover

== Order of battle on mobilization ==
On mobilization in August 1914 at the beginning of World War I, most divisional cavalry, including brigade headquarters, was withdrawn to form cavalry divisions or split up among divisions as reconnaissance units. Divisions received engineer companies and other support units from their higher headquarters. The 20th Division was again renamed the 20th Infantry Division and its initial wartime organization was as follows:

- 39. Infanterie-Brigade
  - Infanterie-Regiment von Voigts-Rhetz (3. Hannoversches) Nr. 79
  - 4. Hannoversches Infanterie-Regiment Nr. 164
  - Hannoversches Jäger-Bataillon Nr. 10
- 40.Infanterie-Brigade
  - 2. Hannoversches Infanterie-Regiment Nr. 77
  - Braunschweigisches Infanterie-Regiment Nr. 92
- Stab und "1/2"-Regiment/Braunschweigisches Husaren-Regiment Nr. 17
- 20. Feldartillerie-Brigade
  - Feldartillerie-Regiment von Scharnhorst (1. Hannoversches) Nr. 10
  - Niedersächsisches Feldartillerie-Regiment Nr. 46
- 2.Kompanie/Hannoversches Pionier-Bataillon Nr. 10
- 3.Kompanie/Hannoversches Pionier-Bataillon Nr. 10

== Late World War I organization ==
Divisions underwent many changes during the war, with regiments moving from division to division, and some being destroyed and rebuilt. During the war, most divisions became triangular - one infantry brigade with three infantry regiments rather than two infantry brigades of two regiments (a "square division"). An artillery commander replaced the artillery brigade headquarters, the cavalry was further reduced, the engineer contingent was increased, and a divisional signals command was created. The 20th Infantry Division's order of battle on March 20, 1918, was as follows:

- 40. Infanterie-Brigade
  - 2. Hannoversches Infanterie-Regiment Nr. 77
  - Infanterie-Regiment von Voigts-Rhetz (3. Hannoversches) Nr. 79
  - Braunschweigisches Infanterie-Regiment Nr. 92
  - Maschinengewehr-Scharfschützen-Abteilung Nr. 32
- 5.Eskadron/Braunschweigisches Husaren-Regiment Nr. 17
- Artillerie-Kommandeur 20
  - Niedersächsisches Feldartillerie-Regiment Nr. 46
  - Fußartillerie-Bataillon Nr. 155
- Stab Pionier-Bataillon Nr. 10
  - 2.Kompanie/Hannoversches Pionier-Bataillon Nr. 10
  - 3.Kompanie/Hannoversches Pionier-Bataillon Nr. 10
  - Minenwerfer-Kompanie Nr. 20
- Divisions-Nachrichten-Kommandeur 20
