= 5th Division (German Empire) =

5th Division (5. Division); in 1870-71 and from August 2, 1914, 5th Infantry Division (5. Infanterie-Division)
- Active: 1818–1919
- Country: Prussia/Germany
- Branch: Army
- Type: Infantry (in peacetime included cavalry)
- Size: Approx. 15,000
- Part of: III. Army Corps (III. Armeekorps)
- Garrison/HQ: Frankfurt an der Oder (1818–1919)
- Engagements: Austro-Prussian War: Gitschin, Königgrätz Franco-Prussian War: Spicheren, Mars-la-Tour, Gravelotte, Metz, Beaune-la-Rolande, Orléans, Le Mans World War I: Battle of the Marne, Race to the Sea, Verdun, Somme, Battle of Delville Wood, 2nd Aisne, Kerensky Offensive, Caporetto, German spring offensive, Hundred Days Offensive

Commanders
- Notable commanders: Wilhelm von Tümpling; Wolf Louis Ferdinand von Stülpnagel; Colmar Freiherr von der Goltz

The 5th Division (5. Division) was a unit of the Prussian/German Army. It was formed in Crossen in 1816 as a brigade, moved to Frankfurt an der Oder in 1817, and became the 5th Division on September 5, 1818. The headquarters moved to Berlin in 1840 and back to Frankfurt in 1845. The division was subordinated in peacetime to the III Army Corps (III. Armeekorps). The division was disbanded in 1919 during the demobilization of the German Army after World War I. The division was recruited in the Province of Brandenburg.

The 10th Brigade of the 5th Division fought in the Second Schleswig War of 1864, including the key Battle of Dybbøl, or Düppeler Heights. The division then fought in the Austro-Prussian War in 1866, including the battles of Gitschin and Königgrätz. In the Franco-Prussian War of 1870-71, the division saw action in the battles of Spicheren, Mars-la-Tour, Gravelotte, Beaune-la-Rolande, Orléans, and Le Mans, and in the Siege of Metz.

The division was mobilized as the 5th Infantry Division in August 1914 and sent to the west for the opening campaigns of the war. In 1914 it fought in the Battle of the Marne and the Race to the Sea. It then settled into positional warfare in the trenches along the Somme. It fought in the Battle of the Somme and in the Battle of Verdun in 1916 and in the Second Battle of the Aisne (also called the Third Battle of Champagne) in 1917. In mid-1917, it was sent to the Eastern Front in response to the Russian Kerensky Offensive. In October 1917, the division was transferred to the Italian Front, where it fought in the Battle of Caporetto. It returned to the Western Front in December 1917, and remained there until war's end, participating in the German spring offensive and the Allied offensives that followed. Until being bloodied in the offensives of 1918, the division was rated a first-class division by Allied intelligence.

== Order of battle in the Franco-Prussian War ==
During wartime, the 5th Division, like other regular German divisions, was redesignated an infantry division. The organization of the 5th Infantry Division in 1870 at the beginning of the Franco-Prussian War was as follows:

- 9. Infanterie-Brigade
  - Leibgrenadier-Regiment Nr. 8
  - Infanterie-Regiment Nr. 48
- 10. Infanterie-Brigade
  - Grenadier-Regiment Nr. 12
  - Infanterie-Regiment Nr. 52
- Jäger-Bataillon Nr. 3
- Dragoner-Regiment Nr. 12

== Pre-World War I organization ==
German divisions underwent various organizational changes after the Franco-Prussian War. The 5th Division was no exception, but unlike many divisions, there were no changes in the division's core infantry regiments. The organization of the division in 1914, shortly before the outbreak of World War I, was as follows:

- 9. Infanterie-Brigade
  - Leib-Grenadier-Regiment König Friedrich Wilhelm III (1. Brandenburgisches) Nr. 8
  - Infanterie-Regiment von Stülpnagel (5. Brandenburgisches) Nr. 48
- 10. Infanterie-Brigade
  - Grenadier-Regiment Prinz Karl von Preußen (2. Brandenburgisches) Nr. 12
  - Infanterie-Regiment von Alvensleben (6. Brandenburgisches) Nr. 52
- 5. Kavallerie-Brigade
  - 1. Brandenburgisches Dragoner-Regiment Nr. 2
  - Ulanen-Regiment Kaiser Alexander II von Rußland (1. Brandenburgisches) Nr. 3
- 5. Feldartillerie-Brigade
  - Feldartillerie-Regiment General-Feldzeugmeister (2. Brandenburgisches) Nr. 18
  - Neumärkisches Feldartillerie-Regiment Nr. 54

== Order of battle on mobilization ==
On mobilization in August 1914 at the beginning of World War I, most divisional cavalry, including brigade headquarters, was withdrawn to form cavalry divisions or split up among divisions as reconnaissance units. Divisions received engineer companies and other support units from their higher headquarters. The 5th Division was again renamed the 5th Infantry Division. Its initial wartime organization was as follows:

- 9.Infanterie-Brigade:
  - Leib-Grenadier-Regiment König Friedrich Wilhelm III (1. Brandenburgisches) Nr. 8
  - Infanterie-Regiment von Stülpnagel (5. Brandenburgisches) Nr. 48
- 10.Infanterie-Brigade:
  - Grenadier-Regiment Prinz Karl von Preußen (2. Brandenburgisches) Nr. 12
  - Infanterie-Regiment von Alvensleben (6. Brandenburgisches) Nr. 52
  - Brandenburgisches Jäger-Bataillon Nr. 3
- "1/2" Husaren-Regiment von Zieten (Brandenburgisches) Nr. 3
- 5.Feldartillerie-Brigade:
  - Feldartillerie-Regiment General-Feldzeugmeister (2. Brandenburgisches) Nr. 18
  - Neumärkisches Feldartillerie-Regiment Nr. 54
- 1./Pionier-Bataillon von Rauch (1. Brandenburgisches) Nr. 3
- 3./Pionier-Bataillon von Rauch (1. Brandenburgisches) Nr. 3

== Late World War I organization ==
Divisions underwent many changes during the war, with regiments moving from division to division, and some being destroyed and rebuilt. During the war, most divisions became triangular - one infantry brigade with three infantry regiments rather than two infantry brigades of two regiments (a "square division"). An artillery commander replaced the artillery brigade headquarters, the cavalry was further reduced, the engineer contingent was increased, and a divisional signals command was created. The 5th Infantry Division's order of battle on March 9, 1918, was as follows:

- 10.Infanterie-Brigade:
  - Leib-Grenadier-Regiment König Friedrich Wilhelm III (1. Brandenburgisches) Nr. 8
  - Grenadier-Regiment Prinz Karl von Preußen (2. Brandenburgisches) Nr. 12
  - Infanterie-Regiment von Alvensleben (6. Brandenburgisches) Nr. 52
  - Machinengewehr-Scharfschützen-Abteilung Nr. 13
- 3.Eskadron/Husaren-Regiment von Zieten (Brandenburgisches) Nr. 3
- Artillerie-Kommandeur 142:
  - Feldartillerie-Regiment General-Feldzeugmeister (2. Brandenburgisches) Nr. 18
  - Fußartillerie-Bataillon Nr. 67
- Stab Pionier-Bataillon Nr. 116:
  - 1./Pionier-Bataillon von Rauch (1. Brandenburgisches) Nr. 3
  - 3./Pionier-Bataillon von Rauch (1. Brandenburgisches) Nr. 3
  - Minenwerfer-Kompanie Nr. 5
- Divisions-Nachrichten-Kommandeur 5
