= Konstantin Bernhard von Voigts-Rhetz =

Prussian general (1809-1877)

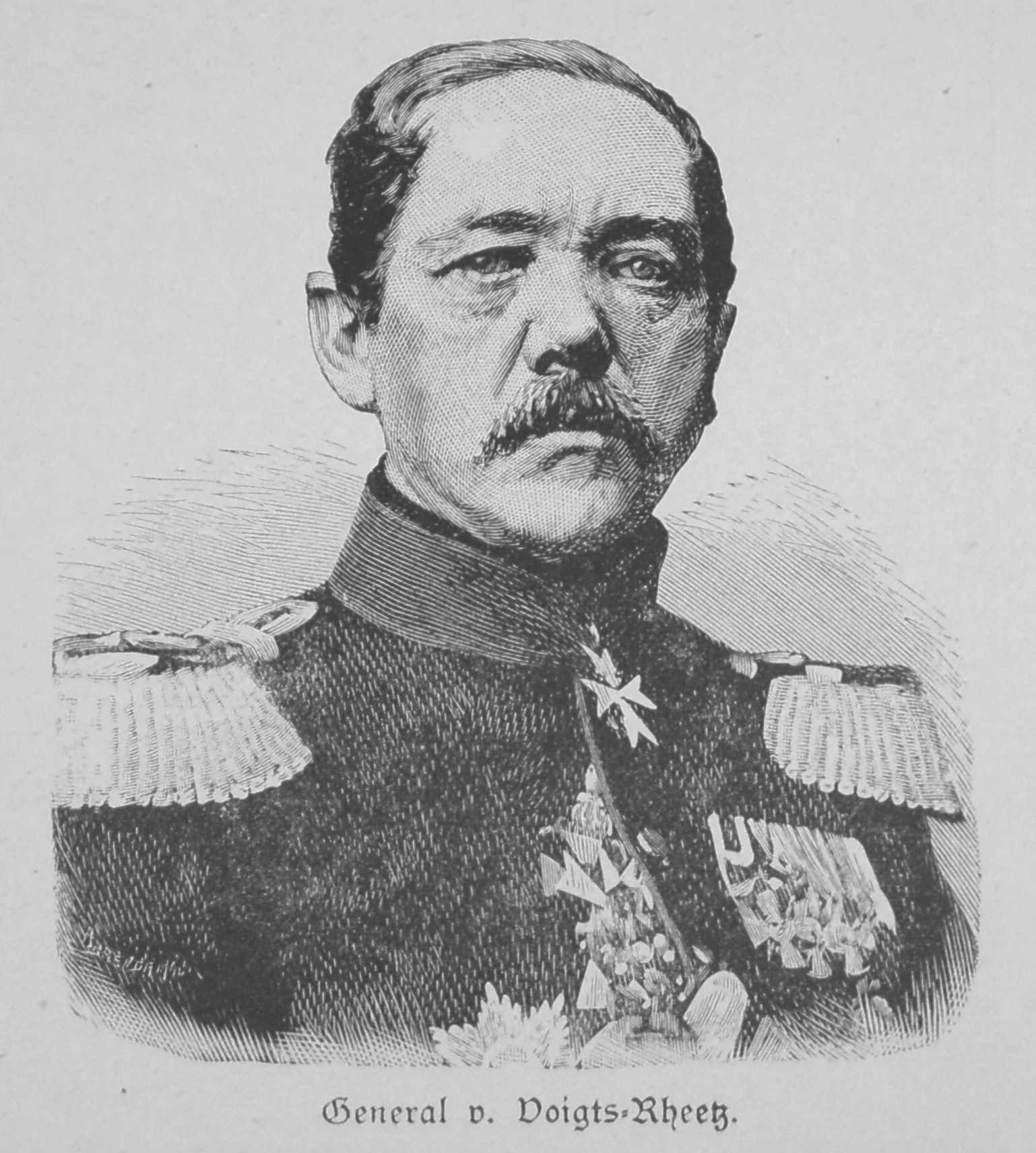
- Born: Konstanz Bernhard von Voigts-Rhetz; 16 July 1809; Seesen, Duchy of Brunswick, Kingdom of Westphalia
- Died: 13 April 1877 (aged 67); Wiesbaden, Province of Hesse-Nassau, Kingdom of Prussia, German Empire
- Relatives: ∞ 4 July 1861 Eleonore "Laure" Wilhelmine Munchen, sister of Alphonse Munchen
- Military career
- Allegiance: Kingdom of Prussia; German Confederation; North German Confederation; German Empire
- Branch: Prussian Army
- Service years: 1826–1873
- Rank: General of the Infantry
- Units: 9th Infantry Brigade; 7th Infantry Division
- Commands: X Army Corps
- Conflicts: Polish insurrection in the Province of Posen, Spring 1848; Austro-Prussian War; Franco-Prussian War; • Battle of Beaune-la-Rolande
- Awards: Pour le Mérite with oak leaves Order of St. George

Konstantin Bernhard von Voigts-Rhetz (16 July 1809 – 13 April 1877) was a Prussian general who served in the Austro-Prussian War and the Franco-Prussian War.

== Biography ==
Konstanz Bernhard von Voigts-Rhetz was born in Seesen in the Duchy of Brunswick, then part of the short-lived Kingdom of Westphalia. He was the son of the forestry, government and departmental councilor Viktor August Wilhelm Arnold von Voigts-Rhetz (1775–1841) and his wife Dorothea "Dorette" Julie Karoline, née von Uslar (1782–1865) He entered the Adolfinum-Gymnasium in Bückeburg at the age of 10, and would excel in math, science, history and geography.

Voigts-Rhetz entered the Prussian 9th Infantry Regiment (called Colbergsches) in Stettin on 12 October 1826, was promoted from Unteroffizier to Portepee-Fähnrich on 15 November 1827 and was made an officer (2nd Lieutenant) on 12 February 1829. Between 1833 and 1835 Voigts-Rhetz attended the Prussian Military Academy. In 1837 he was attached to the topography division. He joined the General Staff in 1839 and was promoted to captain on 12 April 1842 and major on 1 April 1847.

Voigts-Rhetz joined the staff of the V Corps in 1847. When revolutions broke out in 1848 he helped suppress the insurrection in Posen. After the insurrection was quelled Voigts-Rhetz engaged in a dispute with the royal commissioner for Posen, General Karl Wilhelm von Willisen. Both Voigts-Rhetz and Willisen used the press to justify their actions.

In 1852 Voigts-Rhetz became chief of staff of the V Corps. After being promoted to colonel in 1855 he was given command of the 9th Infantry Brigade in 1858, with the rank of a major-general. In 1859, he became Director of the General War Department in the Prussian War Ministry. In 1860, he was given command of the Fortress of the German Confederation in Luxembourg. In 1863 he was promoted to lieutenant-general and given command of the 7th Infantry Division. In 1864 he became commander in chief of the garrison at Frankfurt am Main.

During the Austro-Prussian War Voigts-Rhetz served as chief of staff of the First Army, led by Prince Friedrich Karl of Prussia. Voigts-Rhetz was an opinionated soldier and critical of Chief of Staff Helmuth von Moltke, however was intelligent and courageous. In this function he contributed to the Prussian victories at Münchengrätz, Gitschin and Sadowa. After the war he was made governor-general of the newly annexed Province of Hanover and commander of the newly established X Corps.

During the Franco-Prussian War, von Voigts-Rhetz's X Corps became part of the 2nd Army, again led by Prince Friedrich Karl. With these troops, von Voigts-Rhetz took part in the battles at Mars-la-Tour and Gravelotte. After Gravelotte, X Corps was part of the troops besieging Metz. After the fall of Metz, von Voigts-Rhetz and X Corps were sent to the Loire, where he was victorious at Beaune-la-Rolande. After the end of the war, he remained in command of the Corps until he retired in 1873 for health reasons. He was given a donation of 150.000 thalers for his services during the war.

== Promotions ==
- 12 October 1826 Musketier (Musketeer)
- 15 November 1827 Portepee-Fähnrich (Officer Cadet)
- 12 February 1829 Seconde-Lieutenant (2nd Lieutenant)
- 30 March 1840 Premier-Lieutenant (1st Lieutenant)
- 12 April 1842 Kapitän (Captain)
- 1 April 1847 Major
- 22 March 1853 Oberst-Lieutenant (Lieutenant Colonel)
- 12 July 1855 Oberst (Colonel)
- 22 November 1858 General-Major (Major General)
- 29 January 1863 General-Lieutenant (Lieutenant General)
- 22 March 1868 General der Infanterie (General of the Infantry)

== Awards, decorations and honours (excerpt) ==
=== German States ===
- Kingdom of Prussia:
  - Knight of the Order of the Red Eagle, 3rd Class with Bow and Swords, 1848; Grand Cross with Oak Leaves and Swords on Ring, 2 September 1873
  - Service Award Cross
  - Knight of Honour of the Johanniter Order, 1852; Knight of Justice, 1867
  - Pour le Mérite (military), 11 September 1866; with Oak Leaves, 31 December 1870
  - Iron Cross (1870), 1st Class with 2nd Class on Black Band
  - Grand Commander's Cross of the Royal House Order of Hohenzollern, in Diamonds and with Swords, 16 June 1871
  - Knight of the Order of the Black Eagle, 11 December 1873
- Duchy of Anhalt: Grand Cross of the House Order of Albert the Bear, 10 October 1864
- Brunswick: Grand Cross of the Order of Henry the Lion, with Swords
- (Saxe-Coburg and Gotha) (Duchy of Saxe-Altenburg) (Saxe-Meiningen) Ernestine duchies: Commander of the Saxe-Ernestine House Order, 2nd Class, July 1858
- Luxembourg: Order of the Oak Crown, Commander's Cross with Star (LEK2a)
  - later reclassified as Grand Officer (LEK2)
- Mecklenburg-Schwerin: Military Merit Cross, 1st Class
- Oldenburg: Grand Cross of the House and Merit Order of Duke Peter Friedrich Ludwig, with Swords, 18 June 1869

=== Foreign Orders ===
- Russian Empire:
  - Knight of the Order of St. George, 4th Class, December 1870
  - Knight of the Order of St. Anna, 1st Class

== Literature ==
- Howard, Michael, The Franco-Prussian War: The German Invasion of France 1870–1871, New York: Routledge, 2001. ISBN 0-415-26671-8.
- Wawro, Geoffrey, The Franco-Prussian War: The German Conquest of France in 1870-1871, Cambridge University Press, 2005, ISBN 978-0-521-61743-7
- Wawro, Geoffrey, The Austro-Prussian War: Austria's War with Prussia and Italy in 1866, Cambridge University Press, 1997, ISBN 978-0-521-62951-5
- Moltke, Helmuth von (1867). The Campaign of 1866 in Germany.
- Craig, Gordon A. (1964). The Battle of Koniggratz: Prussia's Victory Over Austria, 1866.
