= X Corps (German Empire) =

X Army Corps X. Armee-Korps
- Flag of the Staff of a Generalkommando (1871–1918)
- Active: 11 October 1866–1919
- Country: Prussia / German Empire
- Type: Corps
- Size: Approximately 44,000 (on mobilisation in 1914)
- Garrison/HQ: Hannover/Adolf-Straße 2P
- Shoulder strap piping: White
- Engagements: Franco-Prussian War Battle of Mars-la-Tour Battle of Spicheren Siege of Metz Battle of Beaune-la-Rolande Battle of Orléans Battle of Le Mans World War I Battle of the Frontiers First Battle of the Marne

Insignia
- Abbreviation: X AK

The X Army Corps / X AK (German: X. Armee-Korps) was a corps level command of the Prussian and German Armies before and during World War I.

X Corps was one of three formed in the aftermath of the Austro-Prussian War (the others being IX Corps and XI Corps). The Corps was formed in October 1866 with headquarters in Hannover. The catchment area included the newly annexed Kingdom of Hanover (thereafter the Province of Hanover), the Grand Duchy of Oldenburg and the Duchy of Brunswick.

During the Franco-Prussian War it was assigned to the 2nd Army.

In peacetime, it was assigned to the III Army Inspectorate. which became the 2nd Army at the start of the First World War. It was still in existence at the end of the war, in Armee-Abteilung B, Heeresgruppe Herzog Albrecht von Württemberg at the extreme southern end of the Western Front. The Corps was disbanded with the demobilisation of the German Army after World War I.

== Franco-Prussian War ==
During the Franco-Prussian War of 1870–71 the army corps fought under the command of General von Voigts-Rhetz in several battles including the Battle of Mars-la-Tour, Battle of Spicheren, Siege of Metz, Battle of Beaune-la-Rolande, Battle of Orléans and Battle of Le Mans.

== Flags of the Line Infantry regiments ==
Due to the large number of Line Infantry regiments then in existence, on 18 December 1890, Kaiser Wilhelm II ordered that the flag colours were to be the same as that of the uniform epaulettes. This was to ensure that each corps attained uniformity. IX and X Corps wore white epaulettes. Notwithstanding this, the flags of the Jäger Battalions would be green.

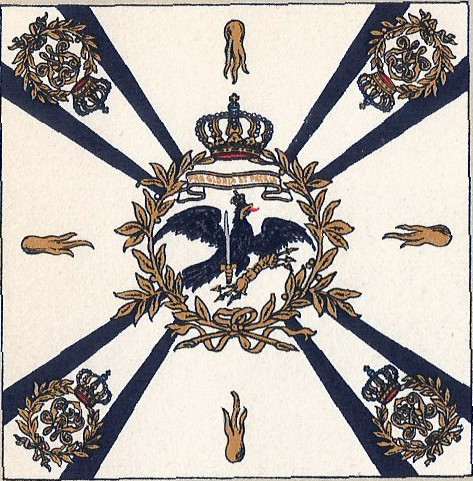
Flag of the Line Infantry regiments of the IX and X Corps (except Jägers)

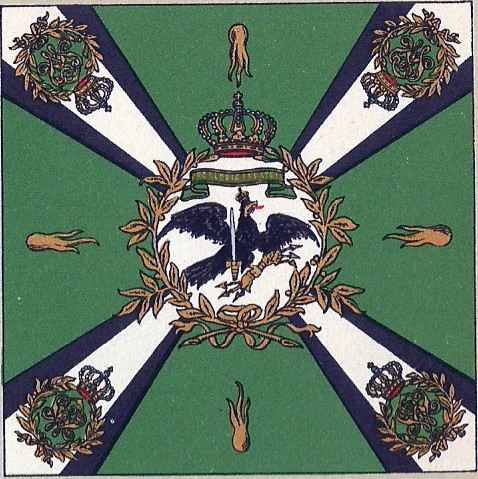
Flag of the Jägers

== Peacetime organisation ==
The 25 peacetime Corps of the German Army (Guards, I - XXI, I - III Bavarian) had a reasonably standardised organisation. Each consisted of two divisions with usually two infantry brigades, one field artillery brigade and a cavalry brigade each. Each brigade normally consisted of two regiments of the appropriate type, so each Corps normally commanded 8 infantry, 4 field artillery and 4 cavalry regiments. There were exceptions to this rule:

V, VI, VII, IX and XIV Corps each had a 5th infantry brigade (so 10 infantry regiments)
II, XIII, XVIII and XXI Corps had a 9th infantry regiment
I, VI and XVI Corps had a 3rd cavalry brigade (so 6 cavalry regiments)
the Guards Corps had 11 infantry regiments (in 5 brigades) and 8 cavalry regiments (in 4 brigades).

Each Corps also directly controlled a number of other units. This could include one or more

Foot Artillery Regiment
Jäger Battalion
Pioneer Battalion
Train Battalion

Peacetime organization of the Corps
Corps	Division	Brigade	Units	Garrison
X Corps	19th Division	37th Infantry Brigade	78th (East Frisian) Infantry "Duke Frederick William of Brunswick"	Osnabrück, III Bn at Aurich
X Corps	19th Division	37th Infantry Brigade	91st (Oldenburg) Infantry	Oldenburg
X Corps	19th Division	38th Infantry Brigade	73rd (Hannover) Fusiliers "Field Marshal Prince Albrecht of Prussia"	Hannover
X Corps	19th Division	38th Infantry Brigade	74th (1st Hannover) Infantry	Hannover
X Corps	19th Division	19th Field Artillery Brigade	26th (2nd Hannover) Field Artillery	Verden an der Aller
X Corps	19th Division	19th Field Artillery Brigade	62nd (East Frisisan) Field Artillery	Oldenburg, Osnabrück
X Corps	19th Division	19th Cavalry Brigade	19th (Oldenburg) Dragoons	Oldenburg
X Corps	19th Division	19th Cavalry Brigade	13th (1st Hannover) King's Uhlans	Hannover
X Corps	20th Division	39th Infantry Brigade	79th (3rd Hannover) Infantry "von Voigts-Rhetz"	Hildesheim
X Corps	20th Division	39th Infantry Brigade	164th (4th Hannover) Infantry	Hamelin, III Bn at Holzminden
X Corps	20th Division	40th Infantry Brigade	77th (2nd Hannover) Infantry	Celle
X Corps	20th Division	40th Infantry Brigade	92nd (Brunswick) Infantry	Braunschweig
X Corps	20th Division	20th Field Artillery Brigade	10th (1st Hannover) Field Artillery "von Scharnhorst"	Hannover
X Corps	20th Division	20th Field Artillery Brigade	46th (Lower Saxony) Field Artillery	Wolfenbüttel, Celle
X Corps	20th Division	20th Cavalry Brigade	16th (2nd Hannover) Dragoons	Lüneburg
X Corps	20th Division	20th Cavalry Brigade	17th (Brunswick) Hussars	Braunschweig
X Corps	Corps Troops		10th (Hannover) Jäger Battalion	Goslar
X Corps	Corps Troops		10th (Hannover) Pioneer Battalion	Minden
X Corps	Corps Troops		10th (Hannover) Train Battalion	Hannover
X Corps	Corps Troops		6th Telegraph Battalion	Hannover
X Corps	Hannover Defence Command (Landwehr-Inspektion)			Hannover

== World War I ==
=== Organisation on mobilisation ===
On mobilization on 2 August 1914 the Corps was restructured. 19th Cavalry Brigade was withdrawn to form part of the 9th Cavalry Division and the 20th Cavalry Brigade was broken up. The 17th (Brunswick) Hussars was raised to a strength of 6 squadrons before being split into two half-regiments of 3 squadrons each; the half-regiments were assigned as divisional cavalry to 19th and 20th Divisions. Likewise, the 16th (2nd Hannover) Dragoons formed two half-regiments which were assigned as divisional cavalry to 17th and 18th Divisions of IX Corps. Divisions received engineer companies and other support units from the Corps headquarters. In summary, X Corps mobilised with 25 infantry battalions, 9 machine gun companies (54 machine guns), 6 cavalry squadrons, 24 field artillery batteries (144 guns), 4 heavy artillery batteries (16 guns), 3 pioneer companies and an aviation detachment.

Initial wartime organization of the Corps
Corps	Division	Brigade	Units
X Corps	19th Division	37th Infantry Brigade	78th Infantry Regiment
X Corps	19th Division	37th Infantry Brigade	91st Infantry Regiment
X Corps	19th Division	38th Infantry Brigade	73rd Fusilier Regiment
X Corps	19th Division	38th Infantry Brigade	74th Infantry Regiment
X Corps	19th Division	19th Field Artillery Brigade	26th Field Artillery Regiment
X Corps	19th Division	19th Field Artillery Brigade	62nd Field Artillery Regiment
X Corps	19th Division		half of 17th Hussar Regiment
X Corps	19th Division		1st Company, 10th Pioneer Battalion
X Corps	19th Division		19th Divisional Pontoon Train
X Corps	19th Division		1st Medical Company
X Corps	19th Division		3rd Medical Company
X Corps	20th Division	39th Infantry Brigade	79th Infantry Regiment
X Corps	20th Division	39th Infantry Brigade	164th Infantry Regiment
X Corps	20th Division	39th Infantry Brigade	10th Jäger Battalion
X Corps	20th Division	40th Infantry Brigade	77th Infantry Regiment
X Corps	20th Division	40th Infantry Brigade	92nd Infantry Regiment
X Corps	20th Division	20th Field Artillery Brigade	10th Field Artillery Regiment
X Corps	20th Division	20th Field Artillery Brigade	46th Field Artillery Regiment
X Corps	20th Division		staff and half of 17th Hussar Regiment
X Corps	20th Division		2nd Company, 10th Pioneer Battalion
X Corps	20th Division		3rd Company, 10th Pioneer Battalion
X Corps	20th Division		20th Divisional Pontoon Train
X Corps	20th Division		2nd Medical Company
X Corps	Corps Troops		II Battalion, 20th Foot Artillery Regiment
X Corps	Corps Troops		21st Aviation Detachment
X Corps	Corps Troops		10th Corps Pontoon Train
X Corps	Corps Troops		10th Telephone Detachment
X Corps	Corps Troops		10th Pioneer Searchlight Section
X Corps	Corps Troops		Munition Trains and Columns corresponding to II Corps

=== Combat chronicle ===
On mobilisation, X Corps was assigned to the 2nd Army forming part of the right wing of the forces for the Schlieffen Plan offensive in August 1914 on the Western Front.

It was still in existence at the end of the war in Armee-Abteilung B, Heeresgruppe Herzog Albrecht von Württemberg at the extreme southern end of the Western Front.

== Commanders ==
The X Corps had the following commanders during its existence:

From	Rank	Name
30 October 1866	General der Infanterie	Konstantin Bernhard von Voigts-Rhetz
12 December 1873	General der Kavallerie	Prince Albert of Prussia
10 July 1888	General der Infanterie	Leo von Caprivi
24 March 1890	Generalleutnant	Walther Bronsart von Schellendorff
27 January 1893	General der Infanterie	August Wilhelm von Seebeck
4 April 1899	General der Infanterie	August von Bomsdorff
9 February 1908	General der Infanterie	Dr. Alfred von Loewenfeld
29 May 1909	General der Infanterie	Otto von Emmich
22 December 1915	Generalleutnant	Walther von Lüttwitz
21 August 1916	Generalleutnant	Konstantin Schmidt von Knobelsdorf

== See also ==
- Franco-Prussian War order of battle
- German Army order of battle (1914)
- Order of battle of the First Battle of the Marne
- German Army order of battle, Western Front (1918)
- List of Imperial German artillery regiments
- List of Imperial German cavalry regiments
- List of Imperial German infantry regiments

== Bibliography ==
- Cron, Hermann (2002). Imperial German Army 1914-18: Organisation, Structure, Orders-of-Battle [first published: 1937]. Helion & Co. ISBN 1-874622-70-1.
- Ellis, John; Cox, Michael (1993). The World War I Databook. Aurum Press Ltd. ISBN 1-85410-766-6.
- Haythornthwaite, Philip J. (1996). The World War One Source Book. Arms and Armour. ISBN 1-85409-351-7.
- Histories of Two Hundred and Fifty-One Divisions of the German Army which Participated in the War (1914-1918), compiled from records of Intelligence section of the General Staff, American Expeditionary Forces, at General Headquarters, Chaumont, France 1919. The London Stamp Exchange Ltd. 1989 [1920]. ISBN 0-948130-87-3.
- The German Forces in the Field; 7th Revision, 11th November 1918; Compiled by the General Staff, War Office. Imperial War Museum, London and the Battery Press. 1995 [1918]. ISBN 978-1-870423-95-3.
