= Battle of Mars-la-Tour =

1870 battle of the Franco-Prussian War

- Part of the Franco-Prussian War
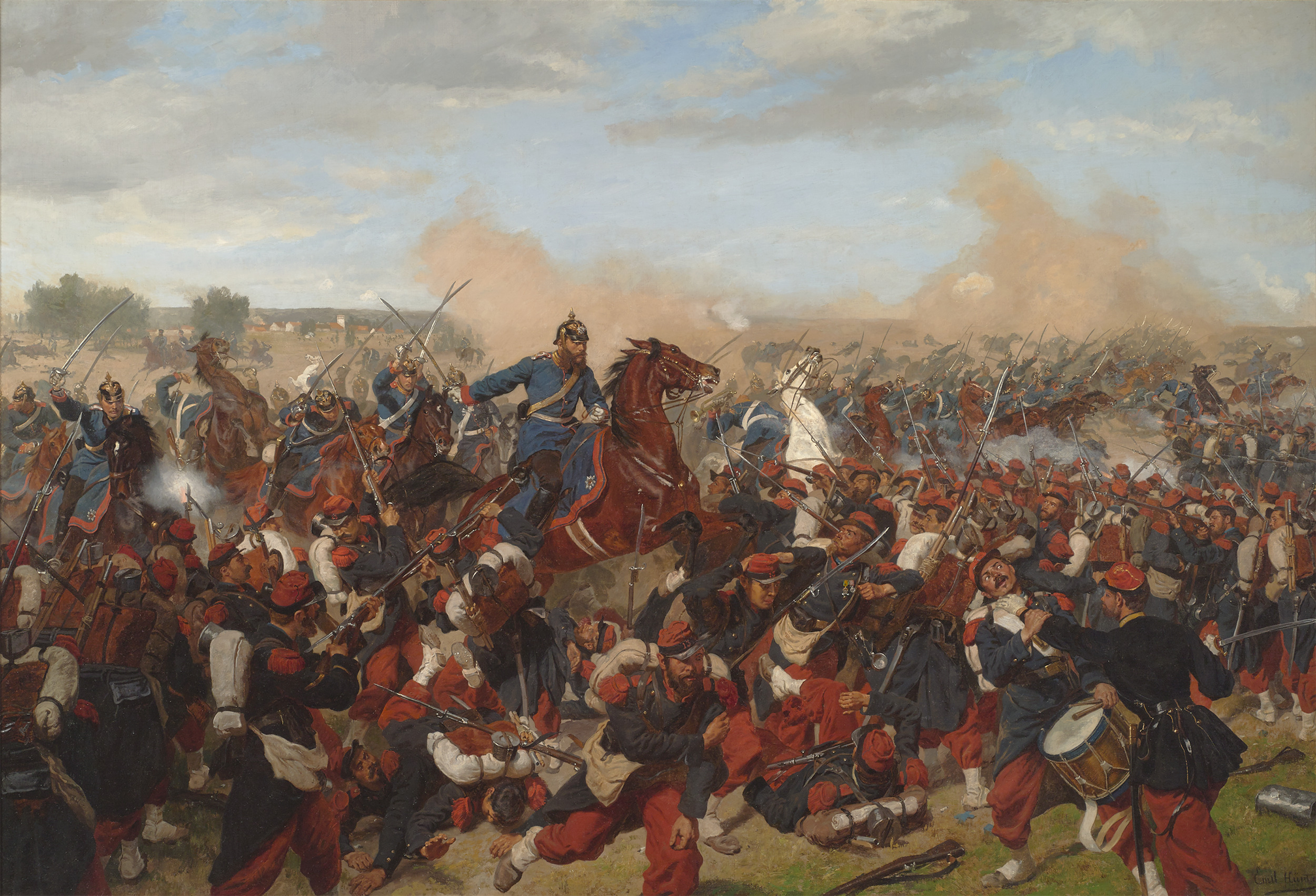
- Heinrich XVII, Prince Reuß, on the side of the 5th Squadron I Guards Dragoon Regiment at Mars-la-Tour, 16 August 1870; Emil Hünten, 1902
| Date | 16 August 1870 |
| Location | Mars-la-Tour, France 49°06′11″N 5°52′21″E |
| Result | Prussian victory |

Belligerents
| (German Empire) North German Confederation: Kingdom of Prussia | (Second French Empire) French Empire |

Commanders and leaders
| (Kingdom of Prussia) Friedrich Karl | (Second French Empire) François Bazaine |

Units involved
| (Kingdom of Prussia) Second Army | (Second French Empire) Army of the Rhine |

Strength
| 80,000; 210+ guns | 80,000 |

Casualties and losses
| 15,799 4,421 killed 10,411 wounded 967 missing 2,736 horses | 17,007 1,367 killed 10,120 wounded 5,472 missing |

The Battle of Mars-la-Tour (also known as the Battle of Vionville or Battle of Rezonville) was fought on 16 August 1870, during the Franco-Prussian War, near the village of Mars-la-Tour in northeast France. One Prussian corps, reinforced by two more later in the day, encountered the entire French Army of the Rhine in a meeting engagement and, following the course of battle, the Army of the Rhine retreated toward the fortress of Metz.

== Prelude ==
After the Battle of Spicheren on 6 August, the German High Command under Graf Helmuth von Moltke the Elder believed that the French Army of the Rhine would not fight on the eastern side of the Moselle. After 12 August, German cavalry reconnaissance made clear the French intention to fight after all. At 1800 on 14 August, Moltke ordered the Second Army under Prince Friedrich Karl to prepare to cross the Moselle and send all available cavalry to the area between Metz and Verdun to ascertain the French movements. On the morning of 15 August, King Wilhelm I, convinced by Quartermaster General Eugen Anton Theophil von Podbielski's argument that the French would not fight east of Metz, ordered the First Army under General Karl Friedrich von Steinmetz to move forward to the western side of Moselle as well.

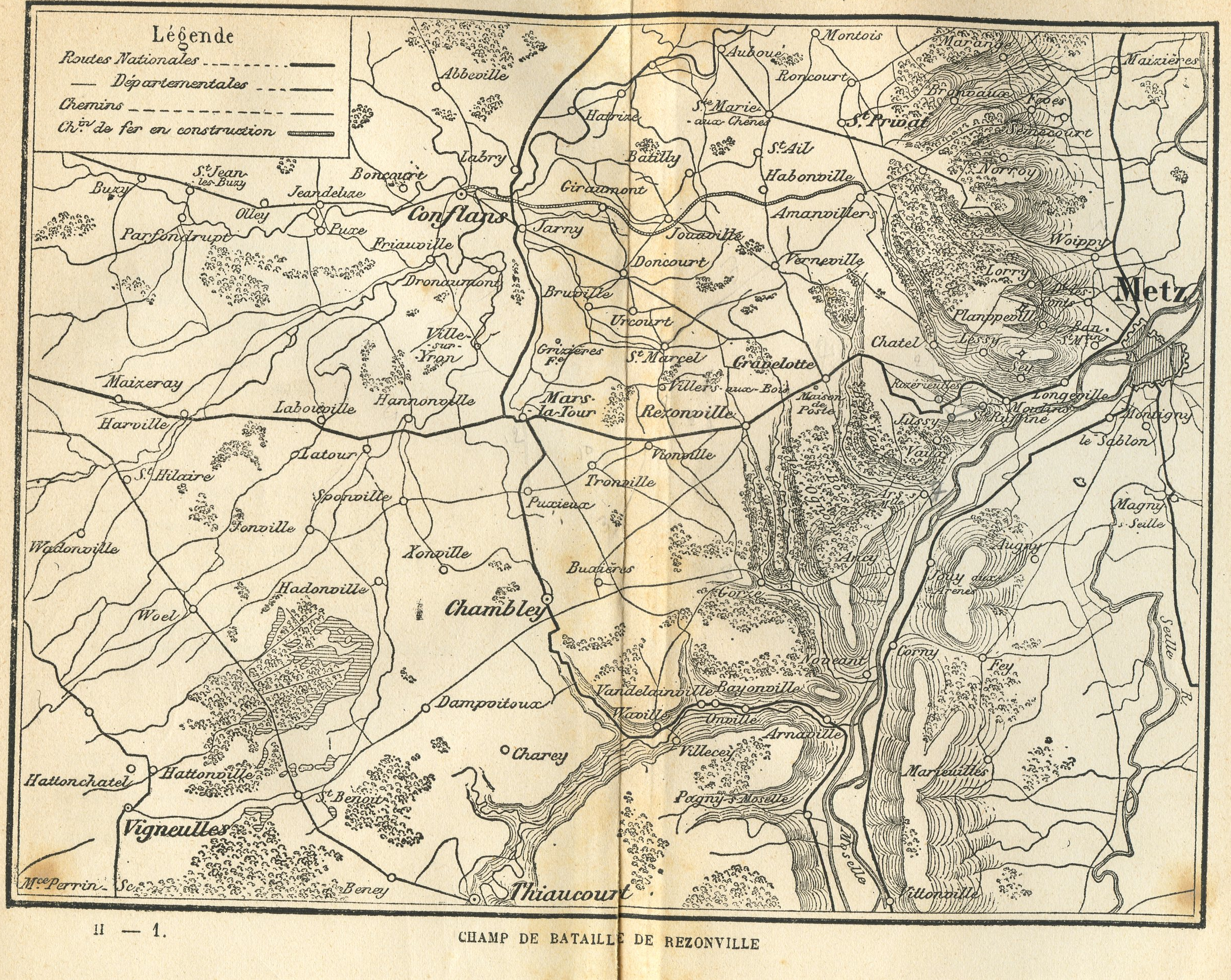
Map of the area of operations (in French).

Meanwhile, Prince Friedrich Karl on 14 August ordered his III and XII Corps to cross the Moselle on 15 August and advance to the Seille, while his four other corps followed behind them. At 1100 15 August, Moltke sent a telegram to Friedrich Karl, informing him that the French were probably retreating without delay from Metz to Verdun. Friedrich Karl ordered III Corps under General Constantin von Alvensleben to cross the Moselle. The divisions of the corps marched off at 1700, the men not having had time to eat. The 5th Infantry Division crossed the bridge at Novéant, which the French had failed to blow up. The 6th Infantry Division erected a light pontoon bridge at Champey, sending its artillery and supply trains to cross at Pont-à-Mousson. The divisions reached their positions near midnight, sleeping only for a short while.

The French withdrawal to the west was ordered on 13 August, interrupted on 14 August by the Battle of Borny-Colombey and resumed on 15 August. Fighting between German and French cavalry went on all day on 15 August to the south-west of Metz, the Germans forcing the French to retreat back toward Metz. At 1830 on 15 August, Moltke ordered Second Army to cut off the French line of retreat along the Metz-Verdun roads and left to Friedrich Karl's judgement the best means to accomplish this task. Friedrich Karl had already made clear in an 1100 telegram to royal headquarters that reports from III Corps had convinced him that the French were retreating toward the Meuse with full speed and the Second Army would have to hurry to cut them off. At 1900 Friedrich Karl ordered III Corps to advance in force to Mars-la-Tour and Vionville. X Corps under General Konstantin Bernhard von Voigts-Rhetz and two cavalry divisions would assist III Corps in the offensive toward the Metz-Verdun roads.

The French were, in fact, not retreating at full speed; the cavalry actions with the Germans, the blocking of roads by supply trains and the spread-out dispositions of the French corps, convinced the Army of the Rhine's commander Marshal François Achille Bazaine to delay the retreat from 0400 until noon 16 August. The French staff officers were busy organizing the supply trains and road traffic, when the battle of Mars-la-Tour began at 0900 on 16 August. Moltke and the royal headquarters had wrongly assumed that a battle would not be fought until the Germans had reached the supposed French positions at the Meuse and directed the German armies to march toward the river without delay. The westward march of the German armies would leave the German troops at Mars-la-Tour heavily outnumbered and without all possible support. Thanks to Moltke's bungling, the French had fifteen divisions against only four German ones; the German III and X Corps should have been wiped out on 16 August, with eight more German divisions available for destruction the next day. The French were the favorites to win the battle at Mars-la-Tour on 16 August and break out toward the Meuse. The tactical superiority of the Prussian army and the lack of vigor and decisiveness on the part of the French high command foiled the French efforts.

== Battle ==
=== Morning ===
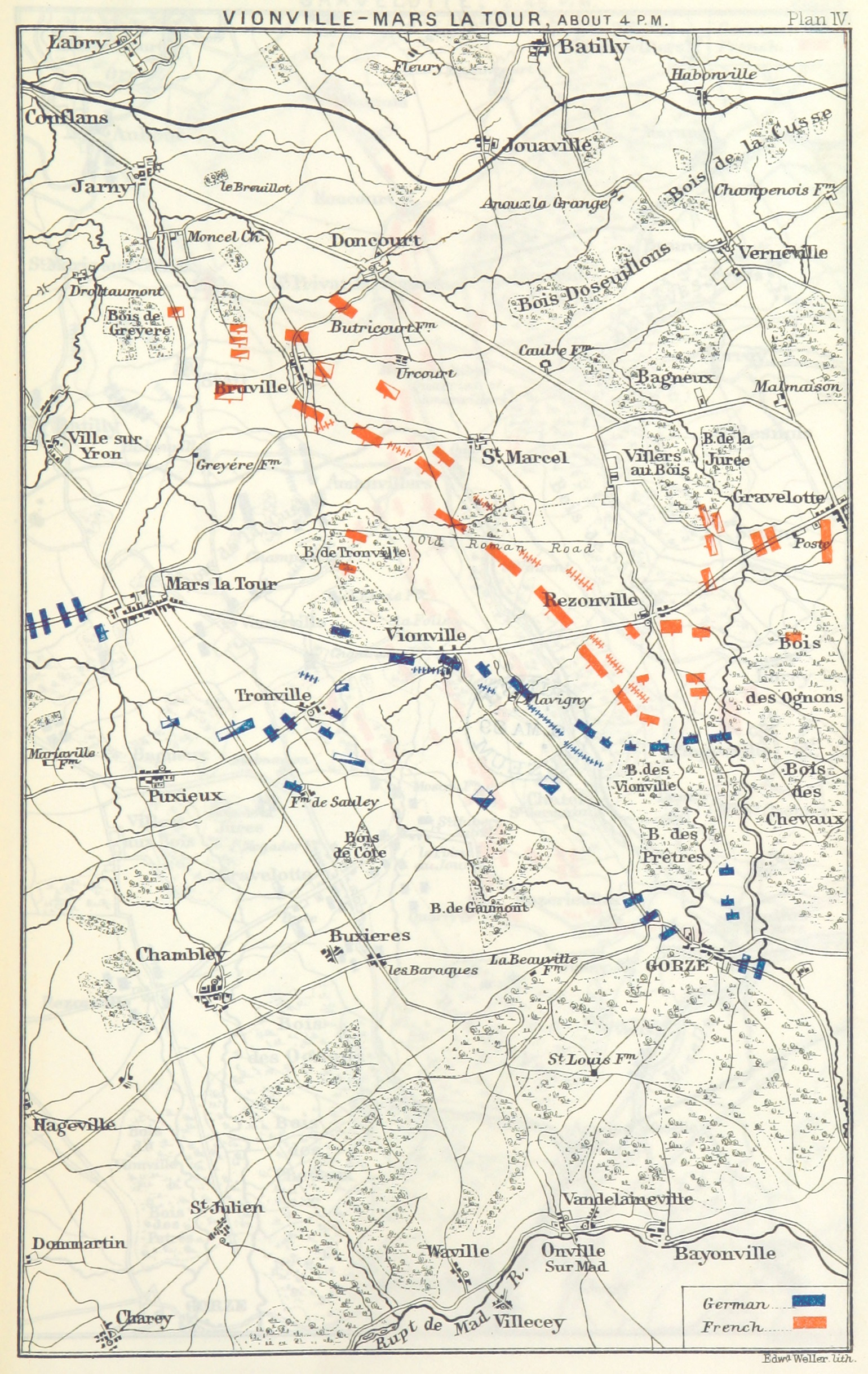
Dispositions at 1600 hours and general map of the area

In the evening of 15 August, Voigts-Rhetz ordered the 5th Cavalry Division under General Paul von Rheinbaben to conduct a reconnaissance-in-force against the French positions near Rezonville. Around 0830 on 16 August, Murat's French dragoon brigade west of Vionville was busy cooking food in a camp and did not employ cavalry or infantry patrols, allowing Redern's hussar brigade to close in without difficulty. A German battery set up position on a nearby height and fired on the surprised French. More German batteries followed and opened up with their guns, throwing the entire French brigade into savage disorder. The French cavalry promptly fled to the east, re-assembling on the Rezonville plateau. The German horse artillery moved forward, firing on Gramont's cuirassier brigade near Rezonville. By 0930, the German cavalry could not support their artillery, as French infantry had by now formed up and were advancing on Vionville, subjecting the Germans to their fire. The German horse artillery fired on the French infantry, receiving French counter-battery fire in turn.

The 6th Cavalry Division was ordered by Alvensleben at 0200 to cross the Moselle by 0530 and lead III Corps. This was only accomplished by 0700, after which the division was told by 5th Infantry Division of French cavalry positions near Rezonville. At 0900, another order arrived from Alvensleben, instructing 6th Cavalry Division to secure the Rezonville plateau. A cavalry brigade under Lieutenant Colonel Rauch that was advancing on the heights, was fired upon from the Bois de Vionville and was forced to retreat after heavy losses. Grüter's brigade had more success around 0915, its cavalry sending French skirmishers fleeing, while its artillery raked French infantry camps near the Bois de St. Arnould.

The French responded with great force. Marshal François Certain Canrobert's 6th Army Corps sent two divisions to Vionville and Flavigny. General Charles Auguste Frossard's 2nd Army Corps sent Bataille's division to occupy Vionville, Verge's division to control the heights north of Gorze and Lapasset's brigade to occupy the Bois de St. Arnould. The German artillery batteries at Vionville were now subject to artillery and skirmisher fire and were sent fleeing. By 1000, the German cavalry was compelled to retreat all down the line before the superior force of the French. At this stage, the Prussian 5th and 6th Infantry Divisions of III Corps reached the battlefield.

III Corps marched up from the Moselle valley on the morning of 16 August. At 0730 5th Infantry Division began marching along the road from Novéant to Gorze, their objective being Vionville. Its advance guard, the 9th Infantry Brigade under General von Döring, arrived at Gorze at 0900, where 6th Cavalry Division had already re-deployed. They received reports from III Corps outposts and the 6th Cavalry Division of French forces advancing on Gorze along the Rezonville plateau. Prussian troops began ascending the plateau around 0900. Two squadrons of Prussian dragoons were forced back by French infantry fire. Commanded by Colonel von Garrelts, the 1st and 2nd musketeer battalions of the 48th Infantry Regiment advanced, the 1st on the left and the 2nd on right with each in a two-line formation, up the ridge to capture the Bois de Vionville and had by 1015 made sufficient progress for the 1st light artillery battery under Captain Stüphasius to unlimber on their flank and for General von Döring to move up the rest of his men in support. The fusilier battalion of the 48th deployed in two lines to the left of the battery, while the 3rd Rifle Battalion secured the nearby Anconville farm.

The commanding general of 5th Infantry Division, von Stülpnagel, first thought that the 9th Infantry Brigade would suffice to deal with the French advance, enabling the rest of the division to move on Flavigny but a personal view of the combat convinced him otherwise. He ordered all 24 of his division's guns into action under the centralized command of Major Gallus. The French 1st Infantry Division under General Verge deployed on the plateau, seeking to outflank the Prussians on both flanks. The 48th Infantry Regiment's two musketeer battalions, reinforced by three rifle companies from 3rd Rifle Battalion, engaged in intense combat, including hand-to-hand fighting, against the French in the Bois de Vionville and had by 1100 mostly captured it. To the east, the Prussian Guard Regiment advanced directly north from Gorze and two of its battalions slowly pushed back Lapasset's brigade in the Bois de St. Arnould.

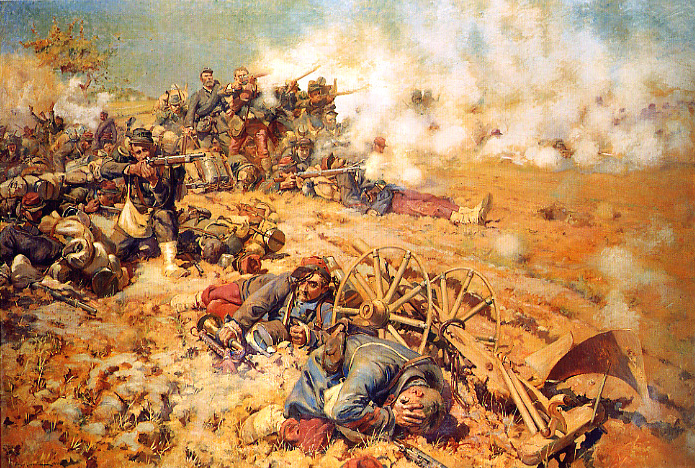
La ligne de feu, 16 août 1870 by Pierre-Georges Jeanniot (1886). French infantry at the battle of Mars-la-Tour.

To the west, an attempt by the 48th Infantry Regiment's fusilier battalion to flank the French positions on the plateau was outflanked in turn by the French, who used their superior numbers to good effect. The battalion was slaughtered and routed by the French. Major Count Schlippenbach's 1st Battalion of the 10th Infantry Brigade's 52nd Infantry Regiment advanced in open company columns to plug the gap and save the now-exposed German artillery. They made initial headway and pushed back the French but eventually fell victim to overwhelming French infantry firepower with all the battalion's officers killed or wounded. They did succeed in buying time for more German reinforcements to arrive. General von Döring was killed at this point, while moving to his left wing. As the French advanced to destroy the crumbling left wing of the 5th Infantry Division, the 2nd Battalion and fusilier battalion of the 52nd Infantry Regiment under Colonel von Wulffen moved up the plateau and used their fire and bayonets to chase the French back to Flavigny. German losses were heavy, with the fusilier battalion commander Major Herwarth von Bittenfeld killed and the 2nd Battalion's commander Major von Bünau wounded. The fusilier battalion nearly ran out of ammunition. Other artillery batteries of III Corps near Tronville provided fire support that contributed to the success of the 52nd. The German artillery could now move forward on the left flank. An X Corps detachment of two infantry battalions, two dragoon squadrons and one artillery battery arrived to reinforce 5th Infantry Division, raising its artillery strength to 30 guns and creating a strong position for the German batteries by 1200. The heavy German artillery fire forced the French to support 2nd Army Corps with guns from the army reserve.

Accompanied by Alvensleben, 6th Infantry Division and the corps artillery began moving from Arnaville to Mars-la-Tour at 0500. At 0630 they received a cavalry reconnaissance report of French formations between Vionville and Tronville. At 0800, the division spotted the French camps themselves. Alvensleben personally reconnoitered the French positions. Believing that he faced the French rearguard, Alvensleben ordered 6th Infantry Division to move north past Mars-la-Tour and block the French retreat to the west. The divisional artillery batteries under Major General von Bülow moved up and formed a gun line by 1030, bombarding the French infantry between Vionville and Flavigny and softening them up for the German infantry assault to come. French infantry fire inflicted casualties on the German artillerymen, who lacked infantry support of their own.

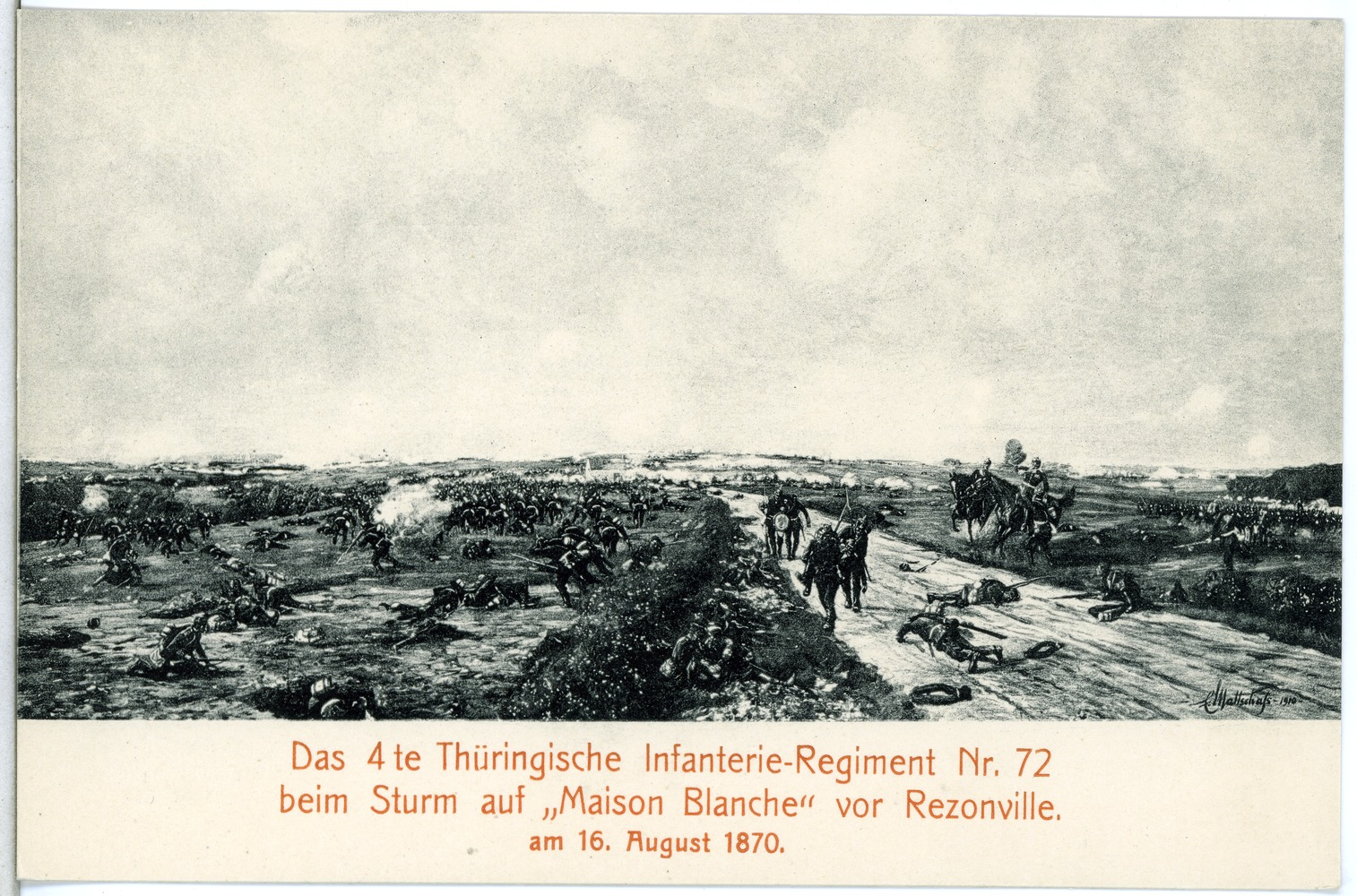
The 4th Thuringian Infantry Regiment No. 72 storming Maison Blanche in front of Rezonville on 16 August 1870.

The 6th Infantry Division was now in line with Tronville. Lieutenant General Gustav von Buddenbrock, commander of the division, conducted a personal reconnaissance of the Vionville-Flavigny area. Finding both villages controlled by substantial numbers of Frenchmen, he concentrated all the force at his disposal to capture them. His 12th Brigade advanced along both sides of the road from Mars-la-Tour to Vionville, while 11th Brigade used the road from Tronville. Two German regiments, the 35th and 64th, launched an exemplary coordinated attack on Vionville, throwing their companies forward in well-organized bounds, using ravines and woods to cover their approach, gaining fire superiority at 300 meters and assaulting the village from the north, west and south at 1130. The place was secured and the French regiment of chasseurs guarding it routed in thirty minutes, with large numbers of them surrendering. The German victory was the direct result of the thorough peacetime training of the German infantry companies and battalions and the exploitation of initiative by German officers.

The initial attack on Flavigny by one battalion of the 35th was less successful, with French infantry fire slashing them to a disorganized remnant when they merely attempted to cross the cemetery hill near Flavigny. Flavigny was conquered by 1200 through Prussian artillery firepower that reduced the hamlet to a burning rubble from multiple sides. Regiments from the 6th and 5th Infantry Divisions stormed the village from the west and the south, firming up the center of the III Corps battle line for the rest of the day. Two 5th Infantry Division battalions advanced north from Flavigny to take the ground in front. 6th Infantry Division pushed back the French along the road to Rezonville.

=== Afternoon ===
With Vionville and Flavigny lost and the French 2nd Army Corps retreating toward Rezonville, Bazaine and Frossard at 1230 ordered the cavalry to stabilize the course of the battle. The 3rd Lancers at Rezonville was ordered to attack the Prussian pursuers but did not charge home because "no definite object of attack had been pointed out to them". The Cuirassiers of the Guard moved to attack, forming up in two lines of two squadrons with the fifth as reserve. The Prussian infantry companies fired by file and massacred them at 200 meters range. The French lost 230 men and 243 horses, and the rest fled as a helpless remnant. Lieutenant Colonel Leo von Caprivi, chief of staff of X Corps, advised Rauch's 17th Hussars to charge the disorganized French cuirassiers at 1245. Rauch promptly did so, while Lieutenant Colonel Eberstein's 11th Hussars hunted down the French infantry stragglers. They also destroyed a French Guard battery and captured the guns, but could not haul them away for want of draught horses. The 3rd French Chasseur battalion and two French cavalry squadrons arrived and forced the Germans to retreat.

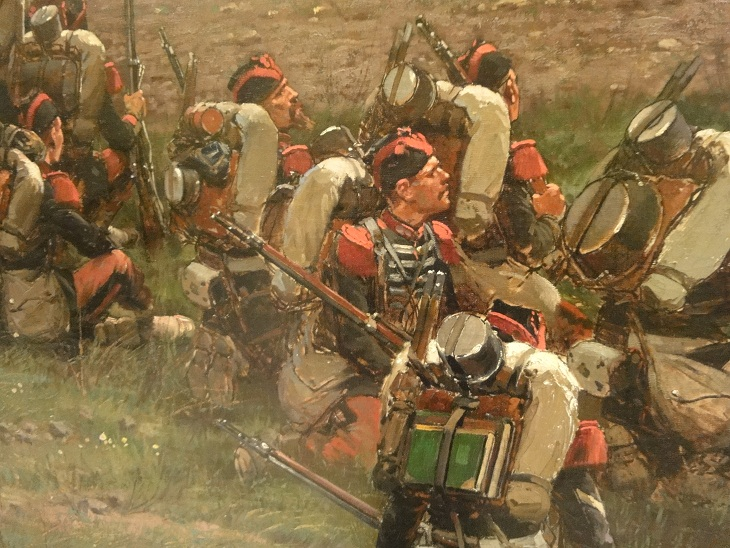
Grenadiers of the French Imperial Guard. Detail from Édouard Detaille's painting of the battle of Rezonville.

Once 2nd Army Corps defeat became clear, Alvensleben ordered the 6th Cavalry Division to pursue. At the same time, Bazaine moved the Grenadier and Voltigeur Divisions forward to support 2nd Army Corps. 6th Cavalry Division was thus halted on the Rezonville plateau at 1300 by an onslaught of French infantry and artillery fire before it could even fully deploy and was forced to withdraw both of its brigades after heavy casualties. The cavalry did enable the forward movement of German artillery to more advantageous positions. The German artillery pounded the French infantry incessantly, forcing the French to hang back and preventing them from exploiting the German infantry's ammunition shortage or the casualties of the German cavalry. As the 6th Prussian Infantry Division advanced on Rezonville, it was subject to flanking infantry and artillery fire by Canrobert's 6th Army Corps to the north along the so-called Roman road, forcing the Prussian division to halt its attack and front north. The Prussians suffered heavy losses from the French guns. They beat off French attacks on their position but at a high cost under the intense French fire. 5th Infantry Division's 10th Brigade advance on Rezonville from the south reached the Metz-Verdun road but was then thrown back by overwhelming French infantry firepower, which killed or wounded nearly all officers of the brigade. Out of ammunition and largely destroyed, the 10th Brigade retreated to Vionville and Flavigny.

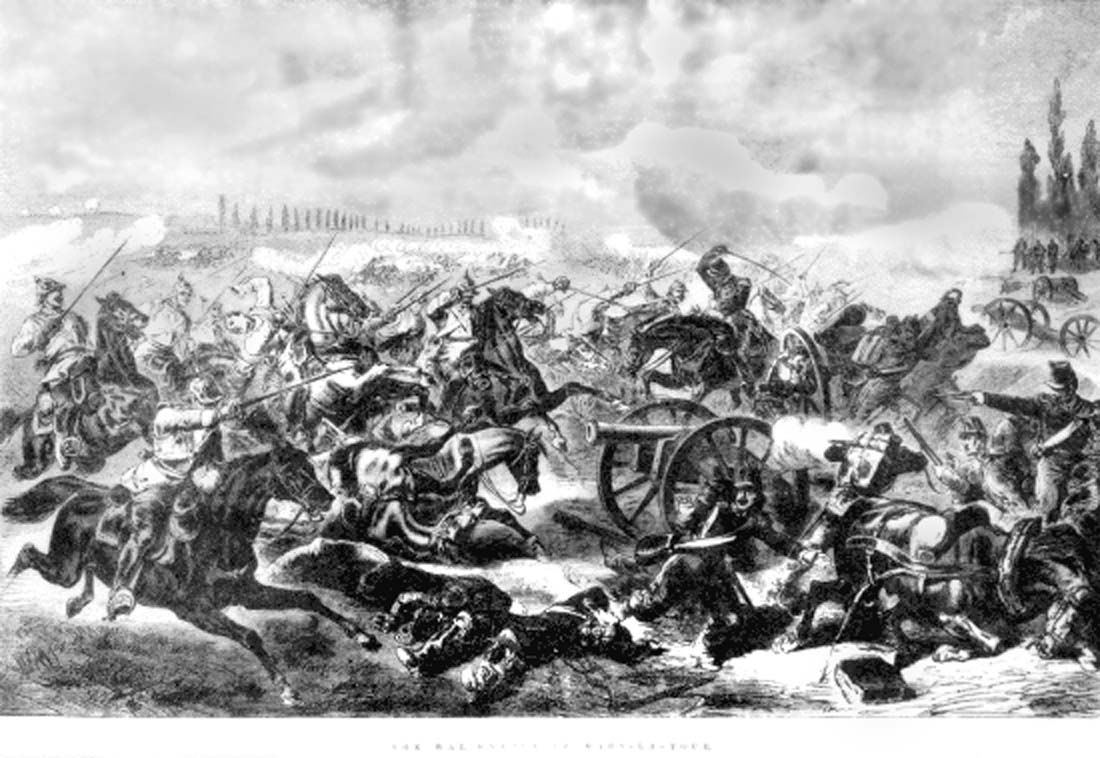
Von Bredow's Death Ride - the Prussian 7th Cuirassiers charge the French guns. Canadian Illustrated News, 19 November 1870

Bazaine saw the arrival of more Prussian forces up the Moselle valley against his left flank as the biggest threat to his position. Accordingly, at noon, he re-deployed the Imperial Guard, the Voltigeur Division and the reconstituted remnants of 2nd Army Corps on his left. All other available forces were directed to outflank the Prussian left wing. At 1330, two French divisions advanced against the German left flank to the west of Vionville, with 4th Army Corps on the way. An X Corps demi-brigade had arrived on the battlefield to reinforce the Germans at 1145 and secured the woods near Tronville by 1230. They were soon attacked by the long-range fire of the French chassepots to which they could not reply owing to the inferior range of their Dreyse needle guns. With the German fire weakening, Canrobert moved to re-capture Vionville. By 1400, Alvensleben's III Corps was facing four deployed French corps. With all his infantry and artillery committed and largely spent, only his cavalry could stop Canrobert's onslaught. Alvensleben directed 5th Cavalry Division to secure the corps left flank with two brigades, while the third heavy brigade under Major-General Friedrich Wilhelm Adalbert von Bredow would remain at his disposal. To protect the German position, Alvensleben sent his chief of staff, Colonel von Voigts Rhetz, to Bredow with orders to silence Canrobert's batteries along the Roman road.

==== Von Bredow's Death Ride ====
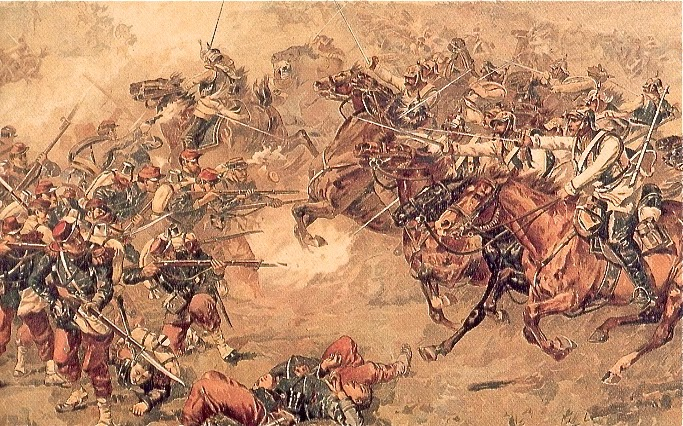
The 7th Cuirassiers' charge by Franz Amling, 1890.

Noting that "it will cost what it will", Bredow took care to organize the brigade, consisting of the 7th Cuirassiers, 13th Dragoons and 16th Uhlans. The 13th Dragoons did not participate in the charge, having been detached earlier in the battle. In what would become known as "Von Bredow's Death Ride", the cavalrymen rode out from Prussian lines at 1400, Bredow using the depression north of Vionville and gun smoke to mask movements from French observers until the very last moment. Erupting into view some 1,000 meters from the French lines, the Prussian cavalry charged in line into and through two French gun lines, killing French gunners and scattering Canrobert's soldiers in all directions. Two brigades of Forton's French cavalry division, some 3,100 men, attempted to counter-charge into Bredow's flank and rear but were partially dispersed by Canrobert's infantry, who shot down any cavalry they could see without discrimination. Bredow's brigade managed to extricate itself and withdrew to its own lines by 1500. The French cavalry did not pursue. Of the 800 horsemen who had started out, only 420 returned.

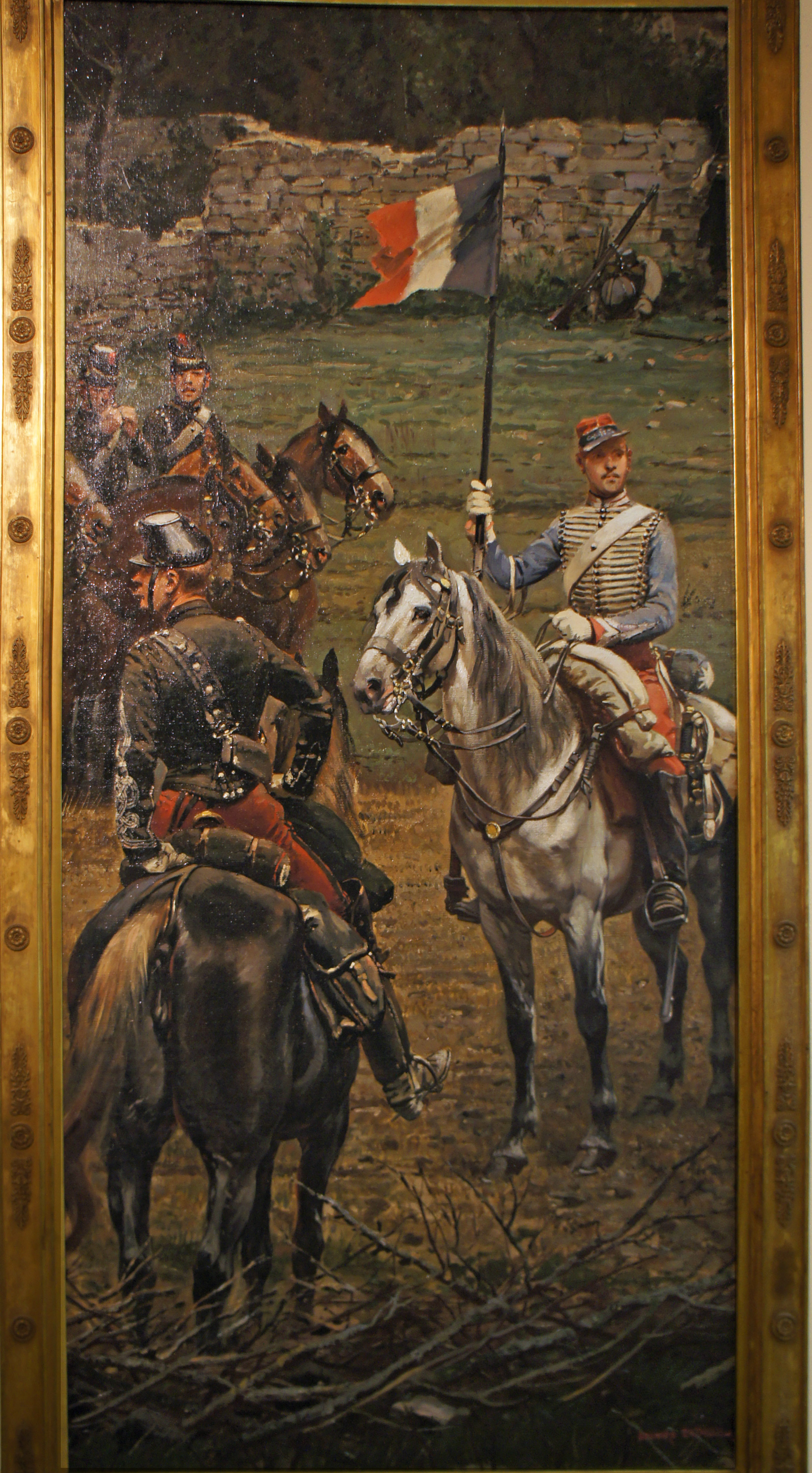
On the right, a sergeant of the French 1st Hussars carries the flag of Marshal François Certain Canrobert. On the left, the captain of the 6th chasseurs à cheval, commanding the escort of the staff of the 6th Army Corps. Fragment from Édouard Detaille's panorama of the Battle of Rezonville.

It was at this moment that Bazaine ordered Canrobert's 6th Army Corps to stop its attack and the pressure on the Prussian 6th Infantry Division ceased. The battle west of Rezonville around the Metz-Verdun road evolved into an artillery duel. On the German left, Barby's 11th Cavalry Brigade was holding its ground north of Tronville. The French and German artillery exchanged shell fire at first and when Grenier's Division from 4th Army Corps arrived, the French began to advance at 1445. Fire from French skirmisher swarms and mitrailleuses overwhelmed Barby's cavalry at 500-meters range and the Germans fell back slowly on Tronville. Four French divisions, two from 3rd Army Corps, Grenier's from General Landmirault's 4th Army Corps and Trixier's from 6th Army Corps, were now massed against the German left flank and poised to outflank it. Faced with French artillery fire, all German forces north of Vionville began to withdraw slowly, delaying the French for an hour. They were helped by the wet ground, which impeded the French movements. French counter-battery fire forced the advanced Prussian batteries, which had nearly exhausted their ammunition, to abandon their positions and restock on ammunition south-west of Vionville.

=== Arrival of German reinforcements ===
As the French stood poised to overwhelm the heavily-outnumbered III Corps, X Corps 20th Infantry Division under General von Kraatz reached the battlefield near Tronville at 1600, having marched 27 miles (43 km). 20th Infantry Division's staff officers and Kraatz personally reconnoitered the vicinity of Tronville and Flavigny and identified the III Corps center as badly weakened. Kraatz ordered his division to reinforce that position immediately. The roar of cannon fire had caused X Corps commander General von Voigts-Rhetz to investigate it and upon arriving in Tronville, reports from his chief of staff Caprivi and the ongoing battle convinced Voigts-Rhetz to move his entire corps at once to support III Corps at 1130. At Tronville, two batteries of X Corps artillery under Baron von der Goltz were joined by two divisional batteries and they concentrated a highly successful fire on Grenier's French artillery. Major Körber's four batteries nearby were joined by a battery of horse artillery, and the German gun mass then blasted the French skirmisher swarms at 750 meters and sent them running back north in disarray. By 1600, III and X Corps had 210 guns supporting them on the battlefield.

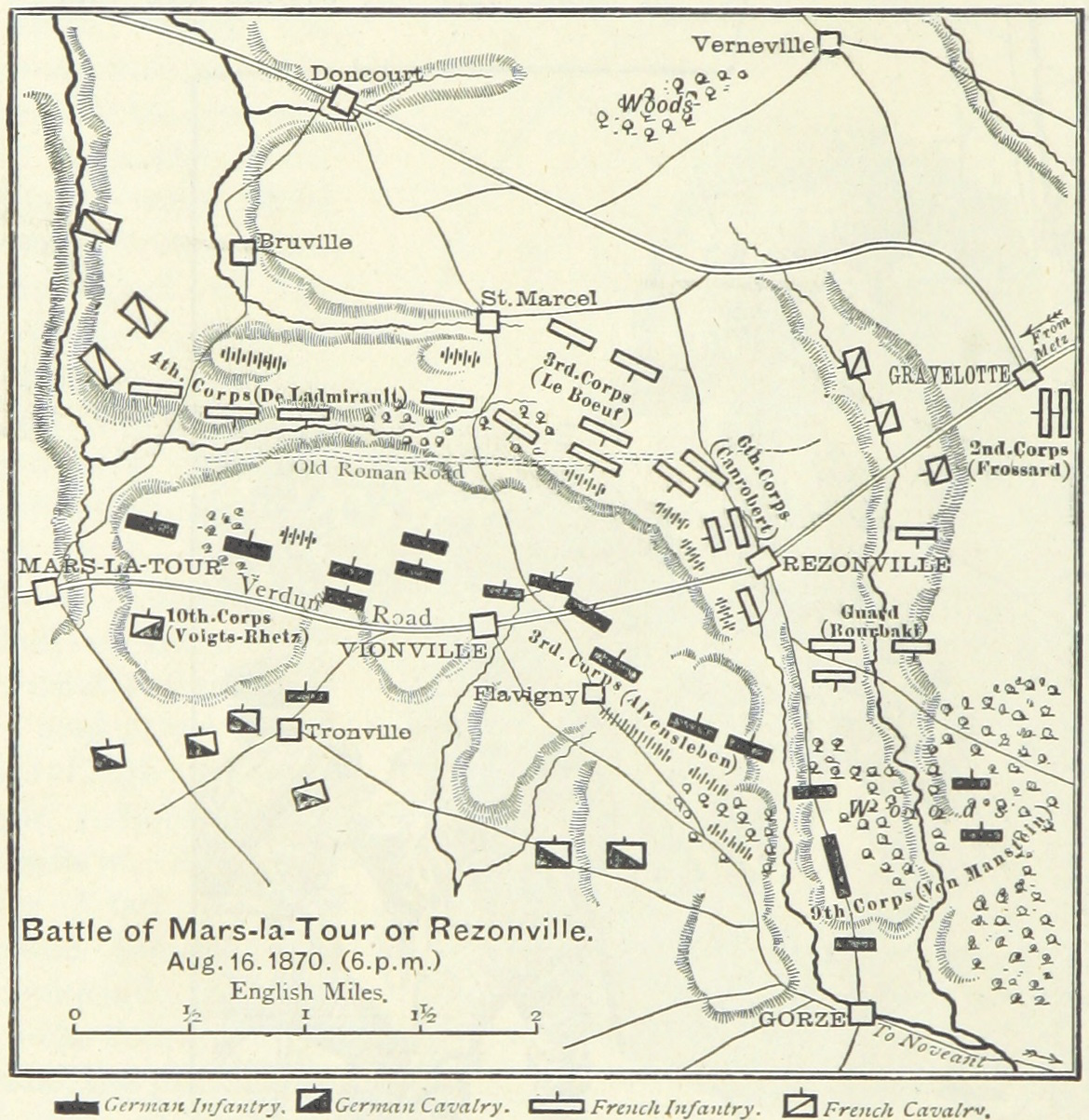
Dispositions at 1800 hours.

Two battalions from the 20th Infantry Division's 79th Regiment formed up near Tronville at 1530. They held their positions on the eastern edges of a nearby wood and withstood the French infantry fire directed against them. The 40th Brigade deployed at Tronville at 1630. They advanced to secure the ground east and north of it and had to endure only French shell fire. The French still had superior forces available but did not pursue their attack, largely thanks to Bazaine's obsession with the French left flank. He ordered the 3rd Army Corps under Lebouef on his right to merely hold their positions. At 1500, Bazaine sent 3rd Army Corps to his left flank to protect Rezonville. As a result, most of Lebouef's troops did not fight at all on 16 August. Bazaine's order was a great help to Alvensleben's III Corps.

Prince Friedrich Karl did not become aware of the precariousness of III Corps struggle until 1400, when a report from Kraatz informed him of the situation. He rode 14 miles (23 km) with his staff to the battlefield, gaining the Rezonville plateau at 1600 to the cheers of his troops. The III Corps and French infantry positions on the plateau, reinforced by strong artillery forces, were so firm that frontal attacks would be impossible. Friedrich Karl decided to fight offensively only with X Corps to the left when it arrived, while III Corps, with the help of X Corps 20th Infantry Division, would fight primarily with the artillery. The artillery batteries of the 5th, 16th and 20th Infantry Divisions were concentrated east of Flavigny under the command of General von Bülow, where they maintained a continuous fire on the French artillery north of the Metz-Verdun road. Isolated attacks by French infantry were beaten off by Prussian artillery before the French could even get within range of the Prussian infantry's needle guns. Two German battalions of 78th East Friesland Regiment under Colonel von Lyncker attempted to capture a height (989) south of Rezonville but failed after a few hundred meters. Lyncker was wounded along with all his company commanders. Two grenadier battalions of the 12th Regiment under Lieutenant Colonel von Kalinowski, supported by two 16th Infantry Division artillery batteries, pushed forward a line of skirmishers to a valley below the 989 height. Three battalions from the 20th Infantry Division arrived and also attempted to capture the 989 height, likewise failing under the French fire. They did gain a position on the slope of the height and defeat French attempts to throw them back. Apart from these relatively modest successes and failures, III Corps situation was stable by 1700.

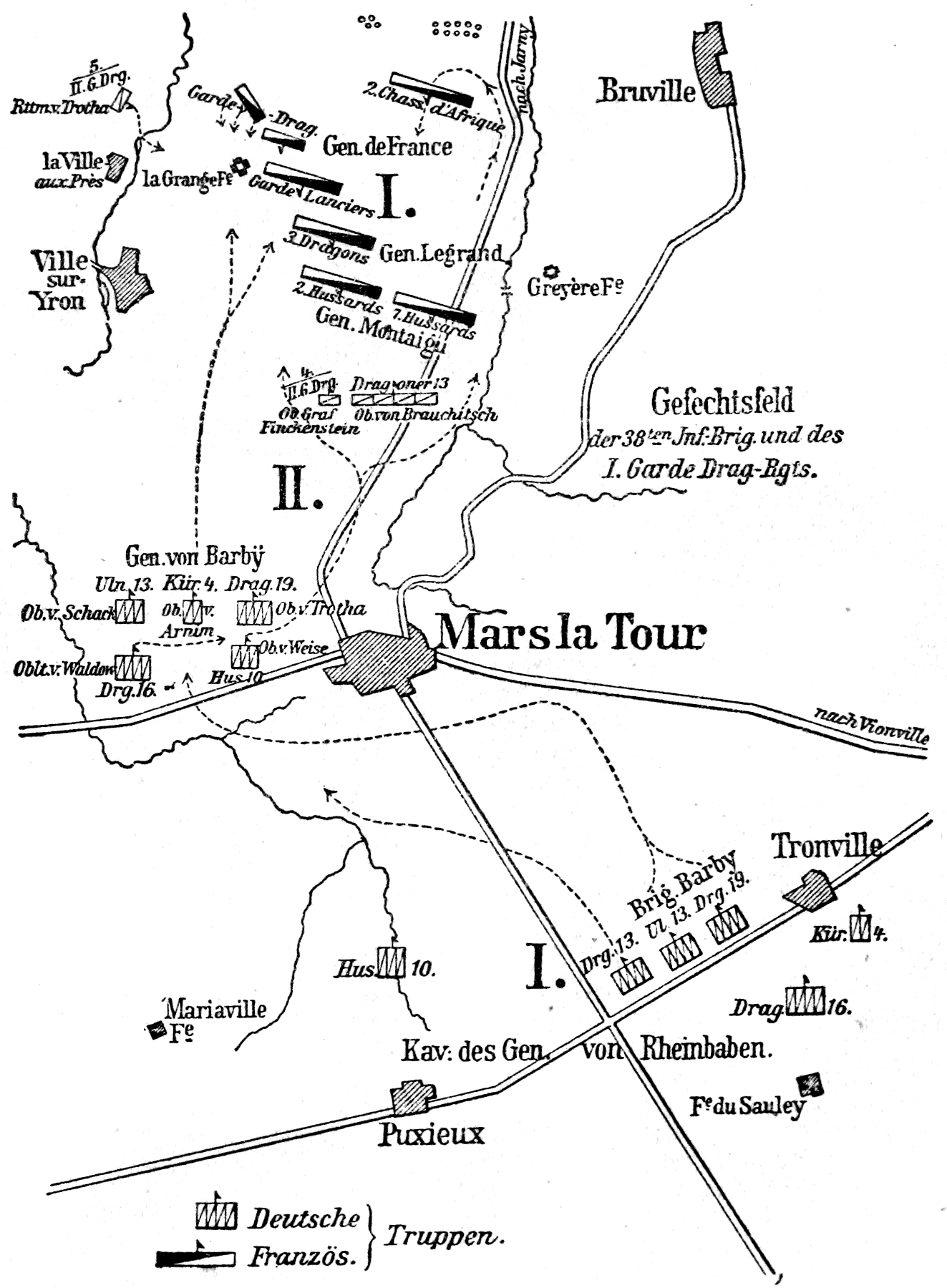
The cavalry battle at 1845.

Meanwhile, half of 19th Infantry Division under General Emil von Schwartzkoppen reached Tronville and Kraatz requested that they attack the French right wing to the north-east. Schwartzkoppen moved out and concentrated his 39th Brigade in an arc north-east of Mars-la-Tour. At 1700, the infantry companies of the 39th Brigade advanced north-east in rushes of 100 meters, laid down and rushed again, all under constant French chassepot and mitrailleuse fire. Its five battalions got within 30 meters of the positions of Grenier's infantry. The French infantry fired by file and shattered the Prussians. Adding to the Prussian disaster, Cissey's Division outflanked the Prussians on their left. The 39th Brigade retreated and the French pursuit fire nearly annihilated its remnants. Some 300 exhausted Prussians, having marched 27 miles and attacked the French immediately on arrival, were captured by the French.

At 1800, the French crossed the ravine north of the Roman road and advanced on Mars-la-Tour. Voigts-Rhetz's cavalry launched repeated charges to hold them off and the French retreated back over the ravine. The 13th Line infantry regiment of Grenier's Division was ridden down and the 2nd Chasseurs d'Afrique cavalry regiment forced back. The Germans used the gained time and space to deploy more artillery batteries to reinforce their left flank. Landmirault's 4th Army Corps deployed six regiments of cavalry on its left flank west of Bruville and north of Mars-la-Tour. Barby's cavalry brigade and two more regiments moved to confront them. At 1845, the opposing cavalry masses collided in a struggle involving 5,000 horsemen and 40 squadrons. Each side sought to outflank the other in the melee. The German regiments succeeded in imposing themselves on the French flank and rear and the entire French cavalry force disintegrated in a rout, fleeing toward Bruville with dust clouds rising behind them. After their complete victory in the greatest and most important cavalry battle of the entire Franco-Prussian War, the Prussian cavalry regiments reformed their ranks and withdrew toward Mars-la-Tour, having defeated the threat to the Prussian left flank. With darkness approaching, Landmirault gave up on his attempts to capture Mars-la-Tour and Tronville. By 1900, the Prussian positions north of Tronville were untroubled save for harassment fire from French artillery.

On the Prussian right, IX Corps under General Albrecht Gustav von Manstein reached the battlefield at 1600. The 72nd Regiment of the 16th Infantry Division gained the northern edges of the Bois de St. Arnould at 1700 and advanced up the ridge to its north. Despite relentless French fire and considerable casualties, the Regiment captured the height (970) but was then driven back by French reserves at 1730. The 40th Regiment advanced in support and took back the 970 ridge, but was compelled in turn to retreat by yet more French reserves. The 11th Regiment assaulted and took back the height at 1800 and was also forced to retreat by Bazaine's reserves. A French attempt to exploit their success was repulsed as the Prussian infantry fired by file.

Around 1800, Bazaine ordered the 2nd brigade of the Voltigeurs of the Guard to take secure the 989 height. They succeeded against the Prussian infantry but accurate Prussian artillery fire forced the French to abandon it. South of the 970 height, the struggle waged back and forth after 1900, with neither side able to gain ground owing to the effectiveness of the firepower of their enemies. With the full strength of IX Corps deploying at his left by 1900, Prince Friedrich Karl ordered III and X Corps to move on Rezonville. Led by artillery batteries, the Prussian advance was stopped by the fire of a concentration of 54 guns of the French Imperial Guard under General Charles-Denis Bourbaki, compelling the Prussian batteries to fall back after a brief response. The 6th Cavalry Division had been called upon by Friedrich Karl, and they charged the French skirmishers along the Rezonville road but while they panicked some, they could make no permanent headway against the French infantry fire. As the strength of the French forces was too great, Friedrich Karl's general attack on Rezonville was not undertaken.

The battle ended at 2100 after twelve hours. The warm summer day gave way to a cold night, as the troops rested in their bivouacs and the lines of outposts maintained a watch over the blood-soaked fields.

== Aftermath ==
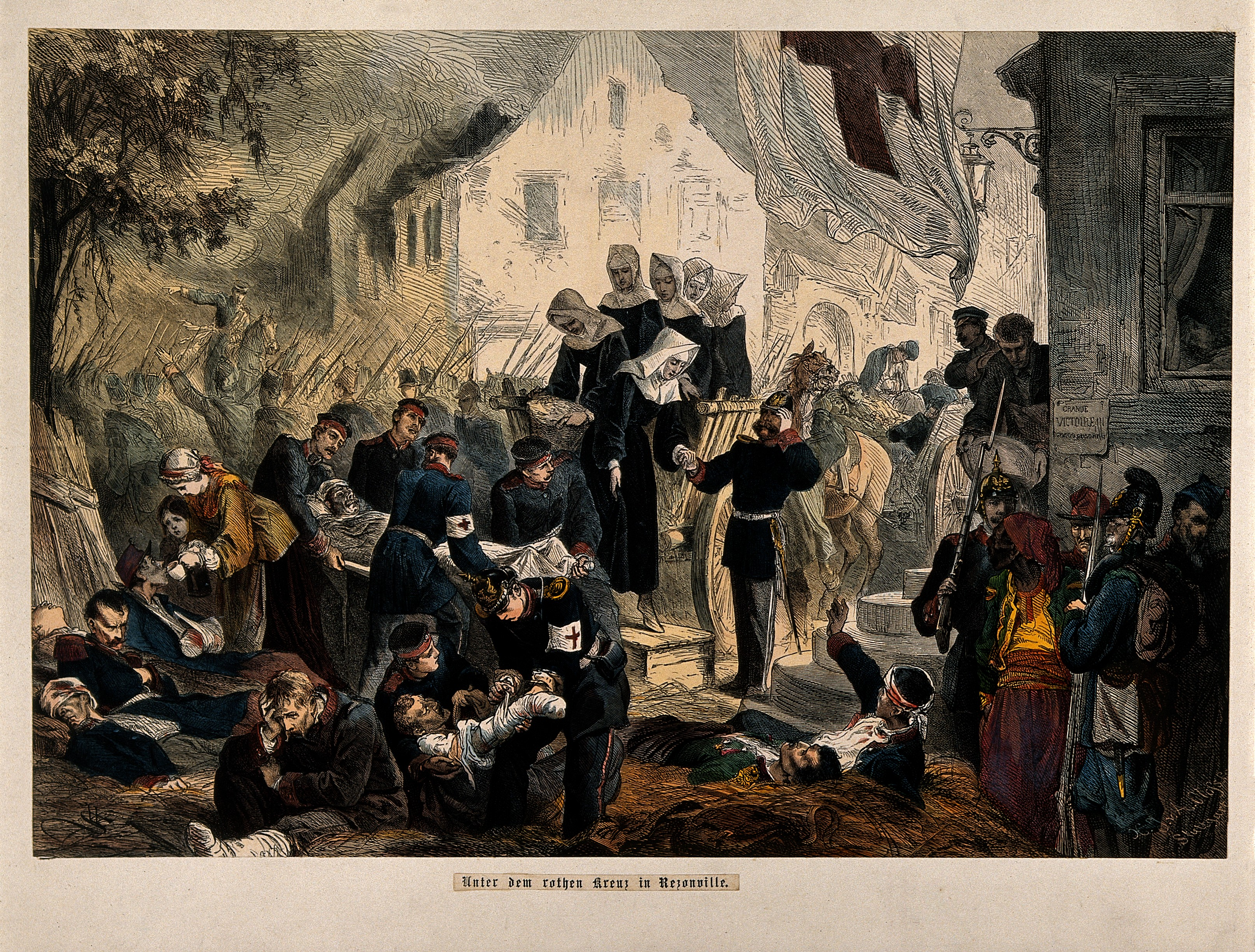
Treatment of the Prussian wounded at Rezonville.

Between 22:00 and 23:00, Friedrich Karl ordered the Guards and XII Corps to assemble at Mars-la-Tour on 17 August. After a stream of reports on the battle from III and X Corps and present staff officers, the royal headquarters in the afternoon of 16 August ordered 1st Army under Steinmetz to prepare to cross the Moselle over to the left bank. Steinmetz implemented orders to the effect and two pontoon bridges were erected on the night of 16–17 August for VII and VIII Corps. The Germans were amassing all available forces to defeat any French attack on 17 August.

Bazaine believed he had fought equal forces on 16 August and would have to deal with an immensely superior enemy on 17 August. French ammunition expenditure had been colossal and ammunition and food stocks would have to replenished before the fight could begin again. The French supply trains were too far back near the Moselle for resupply to be accomplished on 16 August. The French soldiers were physically exhausted and morally shaken by the long and severe battle and one later French military writer opined that the entire French army would have retreated in panic on 17 August had the Germans advanced. Citing the need to acquire more ammunition and the distance from the supply trains, Bazaine issued an order on the night of 16–17 August for his army to fall back closer to Metz. The strong defensive positions of the fortress would, he thought, enable him to inflict massive losses on the Germans and crush their armies. After resupplying, Bazaine would begin anew the march to the Meuse on 19 and 20 August. Despite some skirmishing on 17 August, the Prussians did not pursue the French in force, as attacking that day was not their intention. The French withdrew to the Plappeville plateau east of Gravelotte over the course of the day. There the Battle of Gravelotte would be fought on 18 August.

=== Analysis ===
Mars-la-Tour casualties
| Unit | Total casualties | KIA and DOW | WIA | MIA |
|---|---|---|---|---|
| III Corps | 6,955 | 1,863 | 4,889 | 203 |
| X Corps | 5,151 | 1,614 | 2,994 | 543 |
| IX Corps | 1,236 | 176 | 928 | 32 |
| VIII Corps | 1,050 | 268 | 717 | 67 |
| 5th Cavalry Division | 892 | 122 | 636 | 78 |
| 6th Cavalry Division | 294 | 81 | 186 | 29 |
| Guards Cavalry Division | 220 | 41 | 162 | 17 |
| Total German | 15,799 | 4,421 | 10,411 | 967 |
| 6th Corps | 5,648 | - | - | - |
| 2nd Corps | 5,286 | - | - | - |
| 4th Corps | 2,458 | - | - | - |
| Imperial Guard | 2,123 | - | - | - |
| 3rd Corps | 846 | - | - | - |
| Reserve Cavalry | 535 | - | - | - |
| Reserve Artillery | 111 | - | - | - |
| Total French | 17,007 | - | - | - |

Tactically, neither side succeeded in dislodging the other from their positions during the day. The French withdrew during the night. The battle was a strategic victory for the Prussians. Bazaine had failed to make it to Verdun. After the Battle of Gravelotte on 18 August, the Prussians trapped Bazaine in the city on 19 August, and the Siege of Metz ensued, concluding with the surrender of the French Army of the Rhine on 27 October.

Von Bredow's death ride "was perhaps the last successful cavalry charge in Western European warfare". Its success won it renown among military historians, which created a myth to the effect that for some decades 'Bredow’s achievement was the norm', that cavalry could still play a decisive role in battle in a modern war between equally equipped forces, and so cavalry units continued to be part of the armed forces of major European powers for the next half century.

III Corps 15 artillery batteries expended 11,520 rounds during the battle, an average of 768 rounds per battery. Following the consumption of another 2,740 rounds at Gravelotte on 18 August, the corps restocked on 20 August by completely emptying its five artillery ammunition columns, as well as two more assigned to it from other corps. The 25 battalions of III Corps fired 720,496 rounds of small arms ammunition during the battle, an average of 28,819 per battalion. Some of the front-line infantry battalions of III Corps at Mars-la-Tour were the first German infantry formations to face significant ammunition shortages during the war. III Corps, like all other German corps, had abundant supplies of ammunition; the problem was rather that the infantry battalions at the front were so closely engaged with the enemy that they had become too separated from their ammunition columns and quick replenishment was difficult or impossible. Ammunition shortages were limited to only some of the front-line formations; overall, at Mars-la-Tour and during the war as a whole, German infantry ammunition expenditure was less than expected.

=== Casualties ===
German losses were 15,799 officers and men, including 236 officers and 4,185 men killed, 470 officers, 9,932 men and 9 surgeons wounded and 5 officers and 962 men missing. Horse casualties totalled 2,736. The III Corps suffered 44 per cent of the German casualties and lost 6,955 officers, men and surgeons, including 1,863 killed, 4,889 wounded and 203 missing. The French lost 17,007 officers and men, including 879 officers and 16,128 men, along with one artillery piece.
