= Battle of Beaune-la-Rolande =

Coordinates: 48°04′N 2°26′E

- Part of the Franco-Prussian War
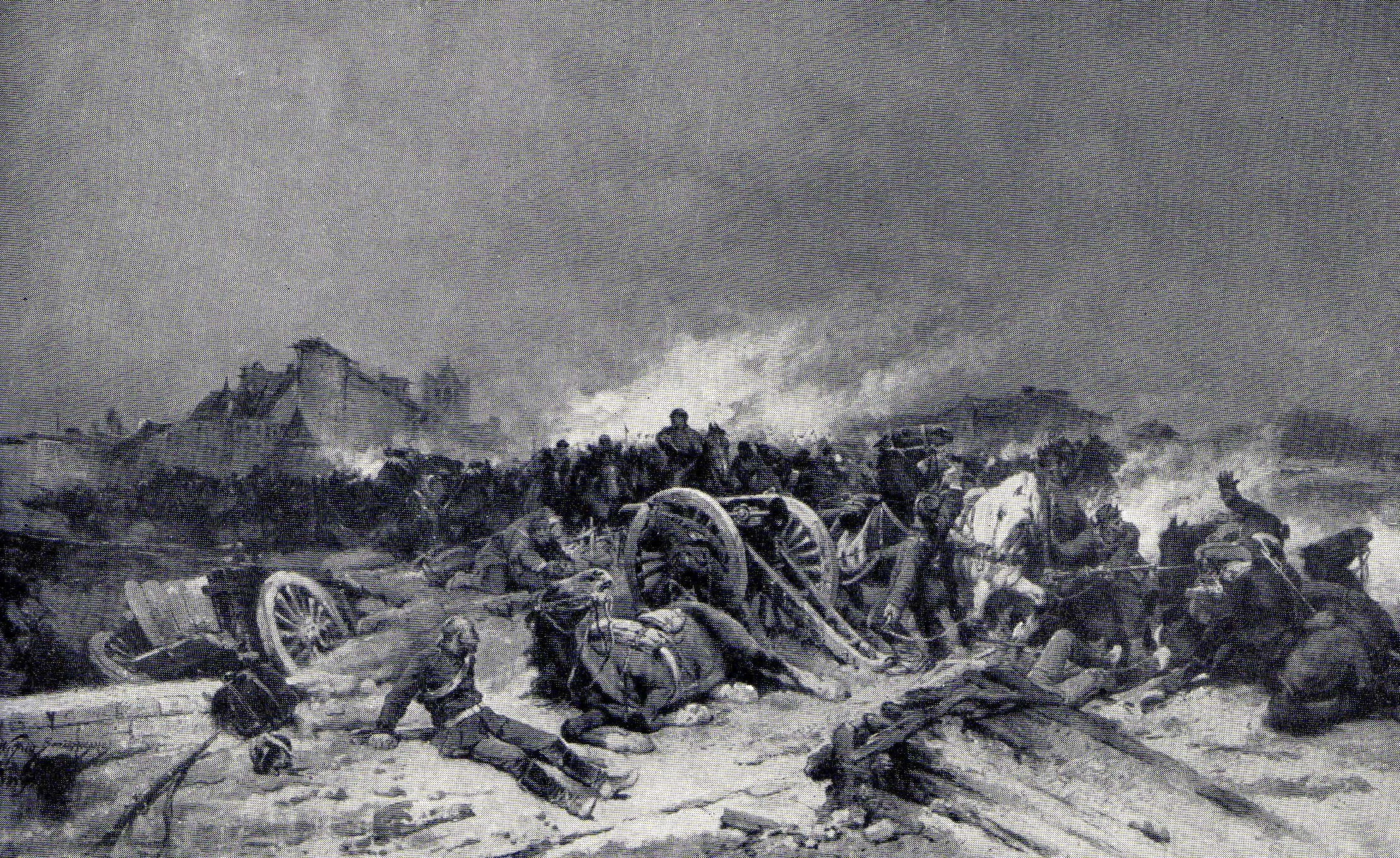
- A near-contemporary depiction of the battle
| Date | 28 November 1870 |
| Location | Canton of Beaune-la-Rolande, France |
| Result | Prussian victory |

Belligerents
| North German Confederation: (Kingdom of Prussia) Prussia | French Republic |

Commanders and leaders
| Prince Friedrich Karl; Konstantin Bernhard von Voigts-Rhetz; Frederick Francis II | General Crouzat |

Strength
| 9,000–12,000 soldiers 70 artillery pieces Up to 40,000 soldiers and 174 guns | 31,000–60,000 soldiers 140 artillery pieces |

Casualties and losses
| 854–1,000 killed or wounded | 4,000–8,000 casualties |

The Battle of Beaune-la-Rolande on 28 November 1870 took place during the Franco-Prussian War, which was won by Prussia. In an attempt to relieve the Siege of Paris, French General Crouzat's XX Corps launched an attack against three Prussian brigades resting in Beaune-la-Rolande. These brigades were from the Prussian X Corps which was detailed to guard the flanks and rear of the force besieging Paris and provide early warning of any French counter-attacks. The French committed a force of 60,000 men, largely conscripts of the Garde Mobile, and 140 guns against the Prussians' 9,000 men and 70 guns, mostly drawn from regular troops, although military historian Gaston Bodart estimated their strength at 40,000 men and 174 guns. Despite the superiority of numbers the French attack failed to take the village and was ultimately forced to retreat by Prussian reinforcements.

Prussian losses amounted to 817 soldiers and 37 officers with the French losing between 4,000 and 8,000 men. The French XX Corps changed its plan of attack, bypassing the village, but was unsuccessful at relieving the siege of Paris, which surrendered on 28 January 1871 and ended the war. The battle is notable for demonstrating the fragility of a conscript army when faced with seasoned, regular troops even when numerically superior, and for the involvement of impressionist painter Frédéric Bazille and electrical engineer Alexander Siemens.

== Background ==
The Prussian army had begun its invasion of France in August and was already laying siege to Paris. The recently appointed General Aurelle and his Army of the Loire ordered the XX Corps under General Crouzat to the Orléans area to push aside the Prussian X Corps, led by Prince Friedrich Karl, which was posted to Beaune-la-Rolande to provide early warning of a French relief force for Paris. The three Prussian brigades at Beaune-la-Rolande were under the command of Konstantin Bernhard von Voigts-Rhetz and were resting after pursuing retreating French forces. The nearest reinforcements were ten miles away at Pithiviers under General Constantin von Alvensleben.

General Crouzat had a force of between 31,000 and 60,000 men and 140 artillery pieces against the Prussian 9,000 to 40,000 men and 70 guns to 174 guns. The French force were equipped with the Chassepot rifle which had almost double the effective range of the Prussian Dreyse and also held the element of surprise. With this in mind an attack was launched at 11.30am against the village which was protected only by a small walled churchyard and a six-foot wall along its south side, the French committed two brigades (6000 men) to this charge.

== Battle ==
=== First attack ===
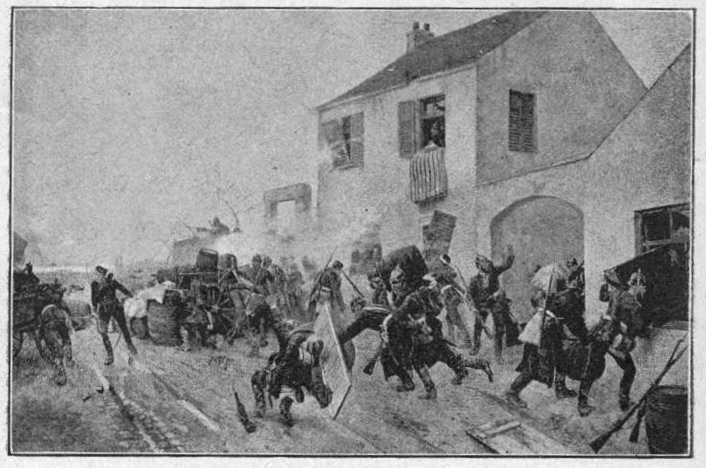
Prussian troops barricading the streets of Beaune-la-Rolande

The Prussians, coming under heavy French artillery fire, withdrew all bar 13 companies of infantry (1,200 men) from the village and awaited the assault. Opening fire at 200 paces, the French assaults were halted at the edge of the village, its roads now protected by barricades. The most successful attack was made by the 3rd Zouave Regiment which left 700 dead and wounded men on the field before breaking. Every one of General Crouzat's staff officers were killed or wounded whilst encouraging the attack.

=== Second attack ===
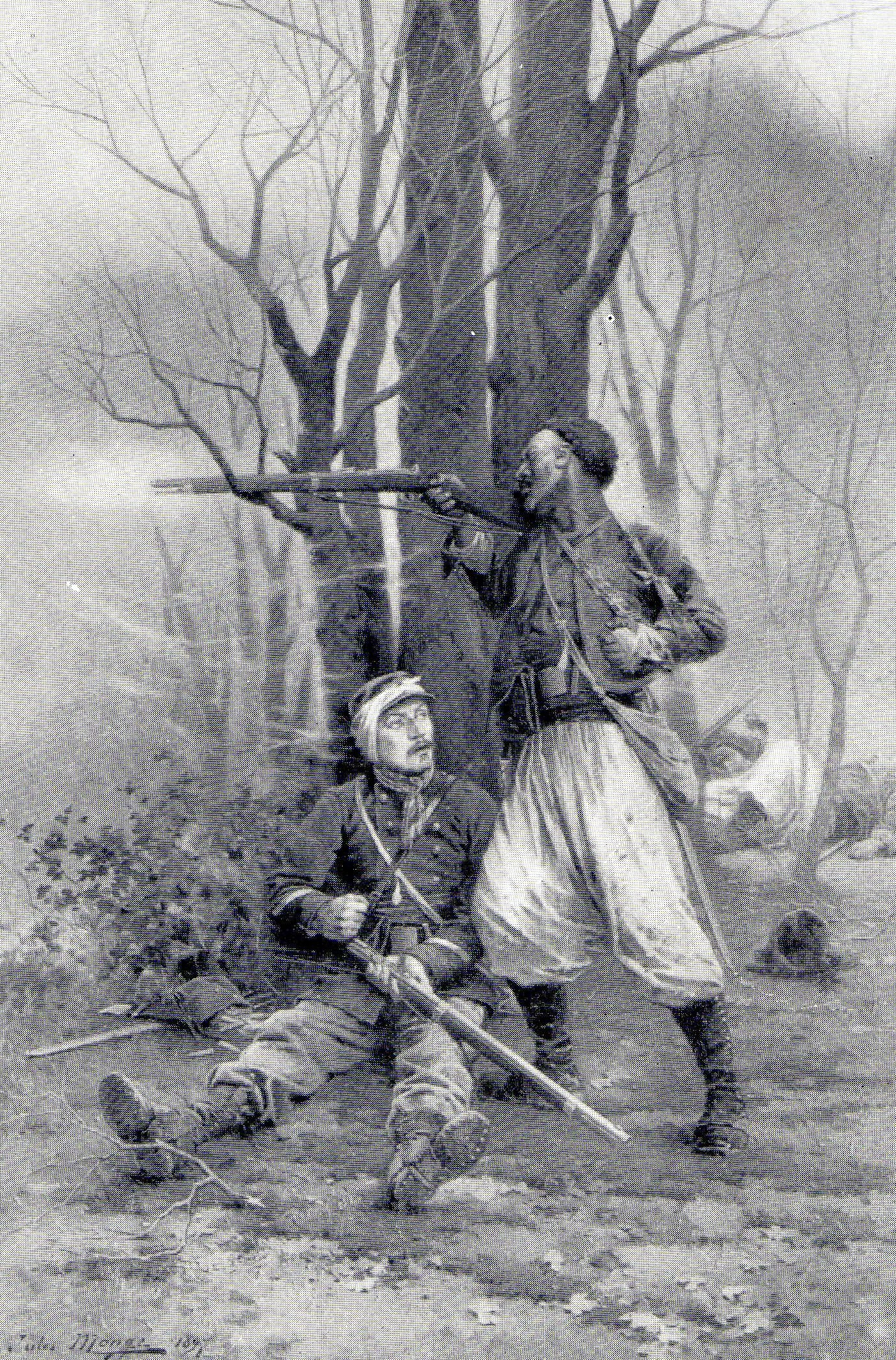
An engraving depicting French troops at the battle

A second attack was sent at 1.30pm with the Prussians running low on ammunition. The defenders held their fire until the French were almost upon them, unleashing a volley which was followed by half an hour of frenzied close combat before the French were repulsed once more. The remaining Prussian forces, including all of the artillery which had pulled back from the village, were reformed at nearby Romainville where they joined with reinforcements from Alvenleben's unit under Wolf Louis Anton Ferdinand von Stülpnagel and attacked the French on the eastern side of the village, finally driving the attackers off.

=== Third attack ===
Crouzat, determined to take the village, ordered one more attack after dark. This attack was delivered straight along the road into the village and came close to breaching the outer defences but was again driven back by the concentrated volleys of Prussian fire. The French had lost heart for the battle and the majority of the men refused their officers' orders to close with the enemy, discharged their rifles at the enemy and ran away.

== Aftermath ==
=== Analysis ===
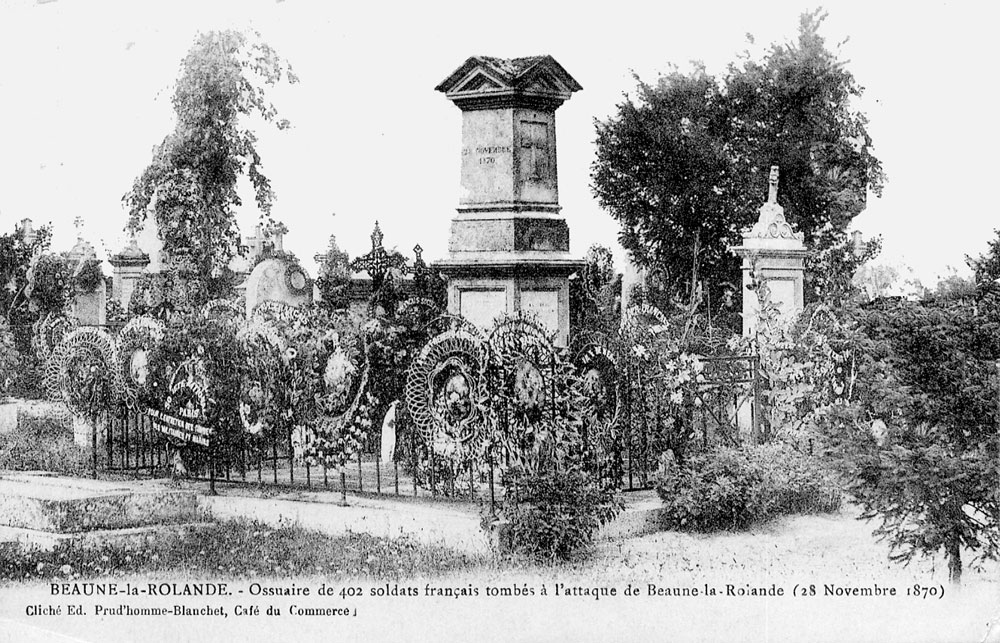
An ossuary containing the remains of 402 French soldiers killed at Beaune-la-Rolande

Military analysts were shocked at the news of the defeat of 30,000 men by 12,000 and many attempts were made to explain why it could have happened. The low morale of the French forces is often cited; the majority were recent conscripts of the Garde Mobile and had seen a string of defeats, German occupation of their land and the siege of the capital. Aurelle was known to be a harsh commander who, for the twenty days preceding the battle, did not permit his troops to be billeted in towns or villages, instead forcing them to bivouac and live off the land. This was intended to improve discipline and harden the troops but simply reduced their morale.

It is cited as one of the first occasions where the fragility of a large recently conscripted army was demonstrated. The Garde Mobile could only be relied upon when defending a fortified position and were almost useless for an attack launched in the style of the Napoleonic Wars. However, almost the entire French regular army was already lost at the battles of Sedan and Metz. This was one of the primary reasons that the Prussians were victorious in the Franco-Prussian War following a string of unexpected French reverses, of which Beaune-la-Rolande was the most spectacular. A sortie from Paris was intended to coincide with the battle but this was delayed until November 30, news of the delay not reaching Aurelle until after the battle due to poor winds for the hot air balloons used as messengers. Upon receiving news of this sortie the Army of the Loire wheeled to the right to bypass Beaune-la-Rolande and march on Paris.

=== Casualties ===
French casualties amounted to around 8,000 soldiers killed and wounded and 100 taken prisoner. The Prussians lost 817 soldiers and 37 officers killed. The French impressionist painter Frédéric Bazille, serving as an enlisted man in the 3rd Zouaves, was killed in action at Beaune-la-Rolande whilst leading his unit in the first attack, his officer having been injured. Alexander Siemens, the German electrical engineer who founded the Society of Telegraph Engineers and Electricians, also fought in the battle as a private in the Prussian army, received a wound and was awarded the Iron Cross for courage.
