= Siege of Metz (1870) =

Battle of the Franco-Prussian War

- Part of the Franco-Prussian War
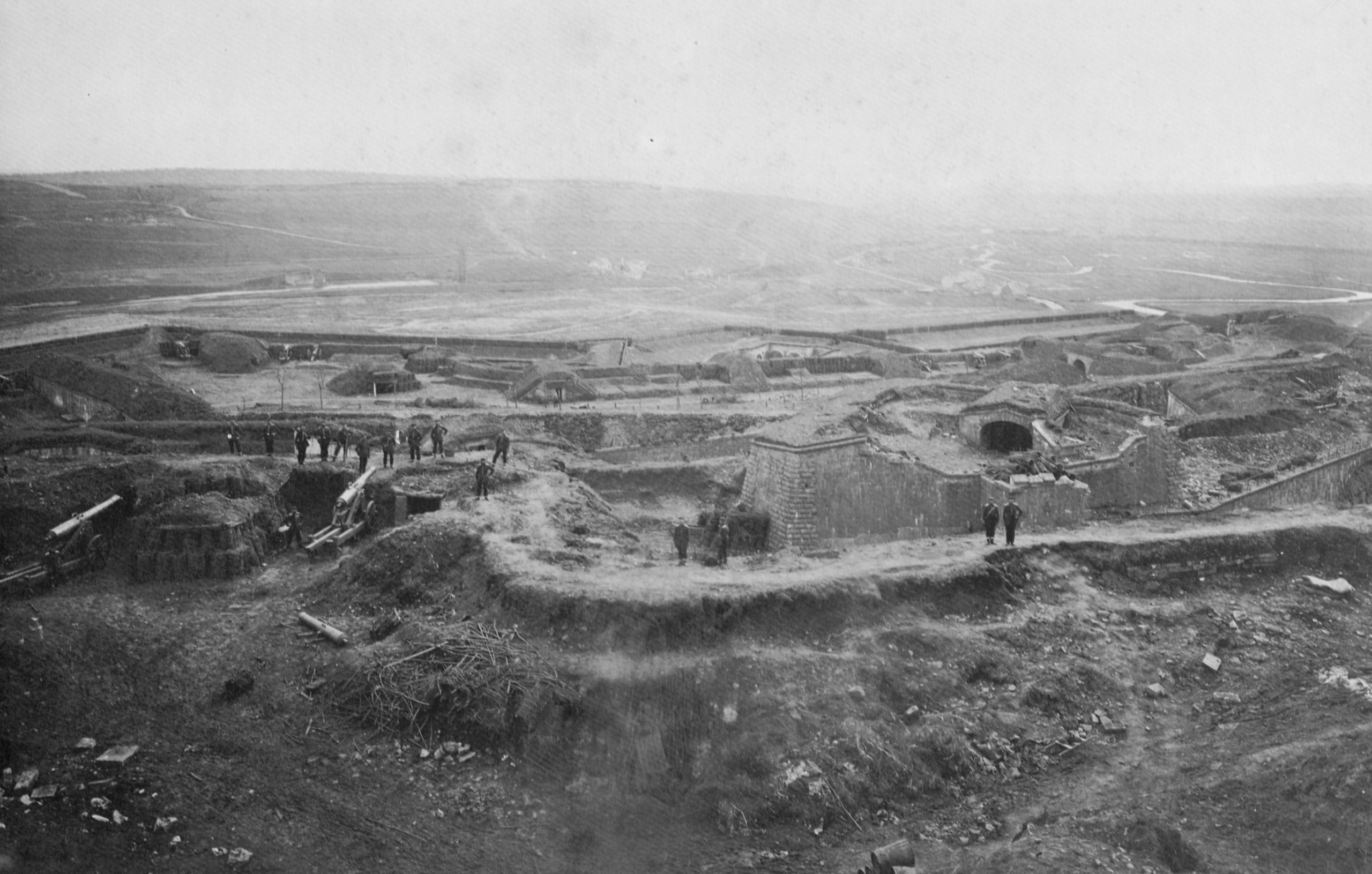
- One of the Metz forts under German occupation after the French surrender
Date	19 August – 27 October 1870 (2 months, 1 week and 1 day)
Location	Metz, France 49°07′13″N 6°10′40″E
Result	German victory
Territorial changes	Metz occupied by the allied German armies

Belligerents
North German Confederation (Kingdom of Prussia) Prussia Hesse-Darmstadt	(Second French Empire) French Empire

Commanders and leaders
Prince Friedrich Karl; Friedrich Franz II	François Bazaine (surrendered)

Units involved
Elements of (Kingdom of Prussia) First Army (Kingdom of Prussia) Second Army	Army of the Rhine

Strength
Initially: 168,435; 642 field guns September: 197,326	154,481; 694 field guns 2,876 fortress guns

Casualties and losses
5,740 killed and wounded 40,000 sick	12,481 killed and wounded, 193,000 men, 622 field guns, 2,876 fortress guns, 72 mitrailleuses, 260,000 rifles captured

The Siege of Metz was a siege fought during the Franco-Prussian War from 19 August to 27 October 1870, and ended in a decisive allied German victory.

The French Army of the Rhine under François Bazaine retreated into the Metz fortress after its defeat by the Germans at the Battle of Gravelotte on 18 August 1870. The fortress was promptly surrounded by German forces under Prince Friedrich Karl of Prussia. The French Army of Châlons was sent to relieve the Army of the Rhine but was itself encircled and annihilated by the German armies at the Battle of Sedan on 1–2 September.

Unable to capture the fortress by bombardment or storm, the besieging Germans resorted to starving the French to submission. French attempts to break out ended in defeat at the battles of Noisseville on 31 August – 1 September and Bellevue on 7 October. French food supplies ran out on 20 October and François Achille Bazaine surrendered the fortress and the entire Army of the Rhine, some 193,000 men, into German hands on 27 October.

The annihilation of the French Army of the Rhine freed Prince Friedrich Karl's armies for operations against French forces in the Loire river valley for the rest of the war. Metz was annexed into the German Empire after the signing of the Treaty of Frankfurt on 10 May 1871.

== Background ==
After being held at the Battle of Gravelotte, Marshal Bazaine retreated into the defenses of Metz. There he was besieged by over 150,000 Prussian troops of the First and Second Armies on 19 August.

== Prelude ==
Napoleon III and Marshal Patrice de MacMahon formed the new French Army of Châlons, to march on to Metz to rescue Bazaine. Napoleon III personally led the army with Marshal MacMahon in attendance. The Army of Châlons marched north-east towards the Belgian border to avoid the Prussians before striking south to link up with Bazaine. The Prussians, under the command of Field Marshal Count Helmuth von Moltke, took advantage of this maneuver to catch the French in an encirclement. He left the Prussian First and Second Armies besieging Metz, except three corps detached to form the Army of the Meuse under the Crown Prince of Saxony. With this army and the Prussian Third Army, Moltke marched northward and caught up with the French at Beaumont on 30 August. After a stiff fight in which they lost 5,000 men and 40 cannons, the French withdrew toward Sedan. Having reformed in the town, the Army of Châlons was immediately isolated by the converging Prussian armies. Napoleon III ordered the army to break out of the encirclement immediately. With MacMahon wounded on the previous day, General Auguste-Alexandre Ducrot took command of the French troops in the field. The Army of Châlons was trapped and destroyed at the Battle of Sedan.

== Siege ==
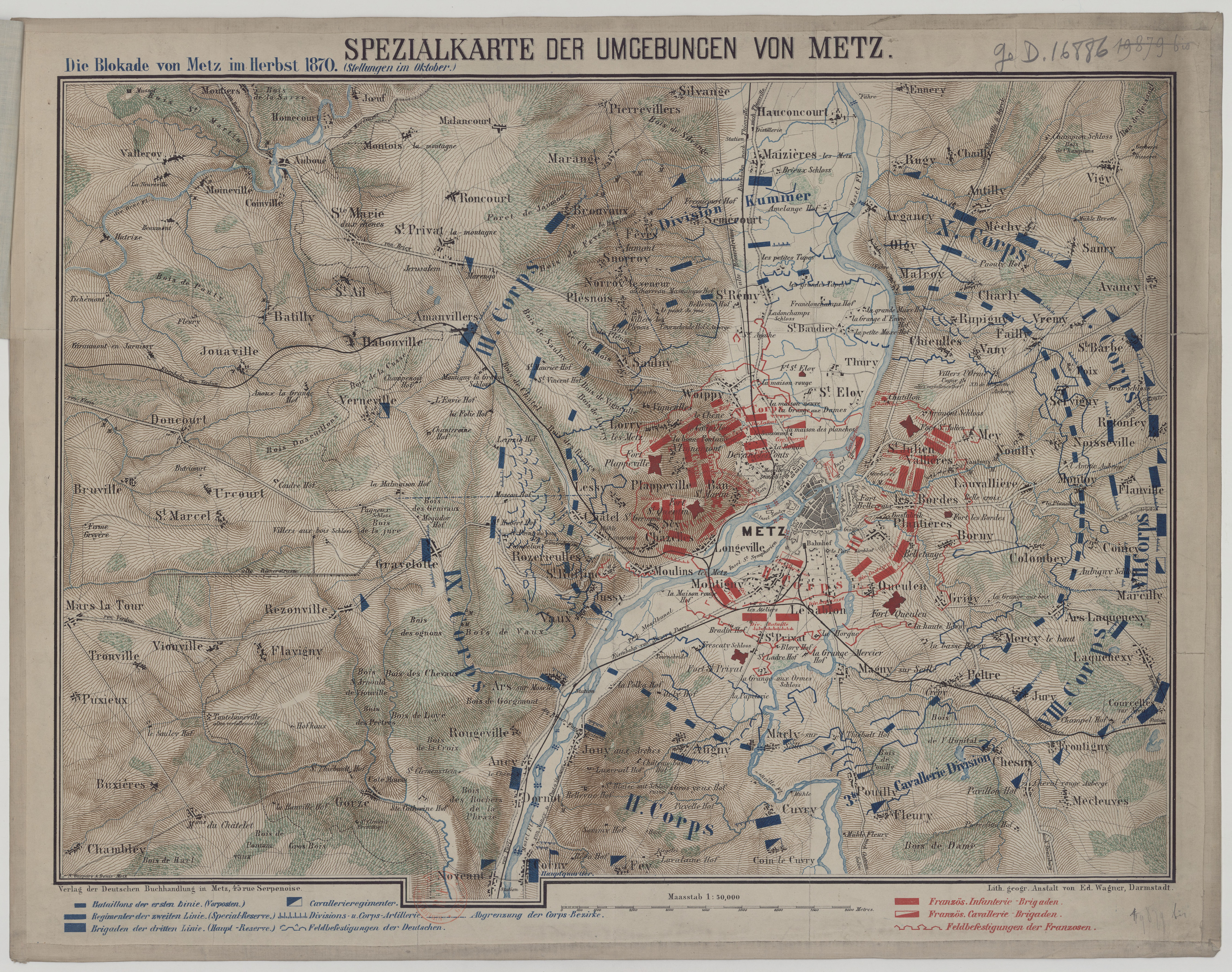
Siege of Metz (Part 1)

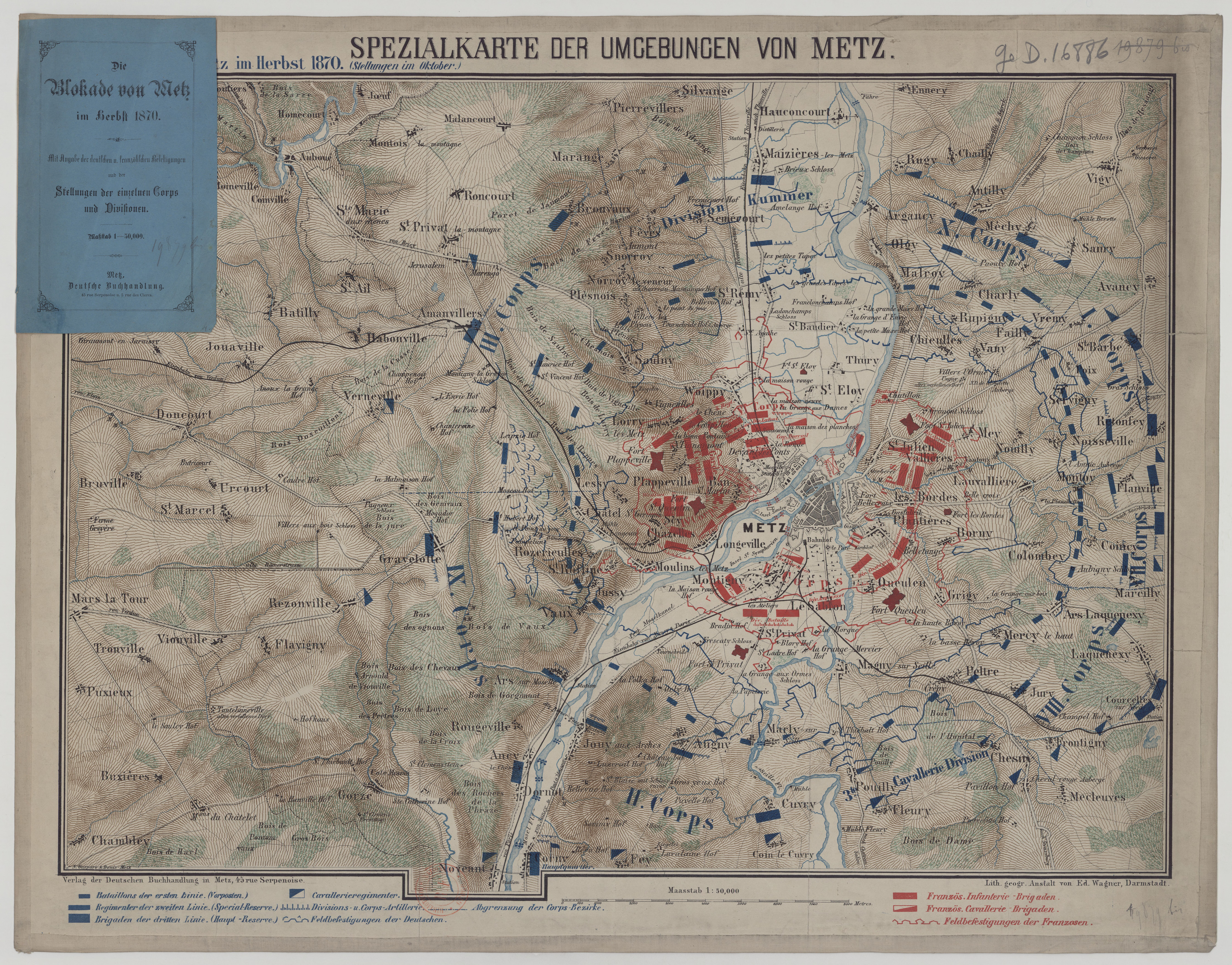
Siege of Metz (Part 2)

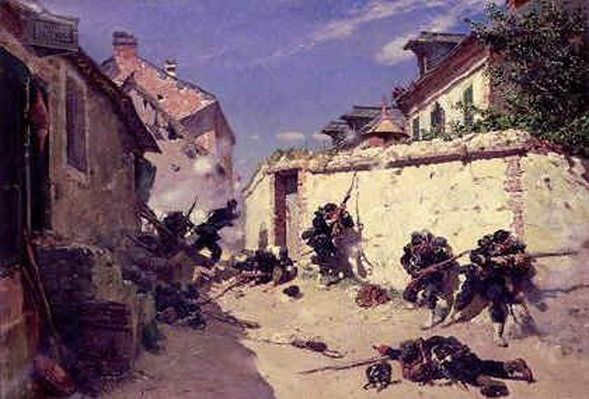
Defence of Metz by the French Army – painting by Alphonse-Marie-Adolphe de Neuville

The French calculated they had enough food for 70,000 civilians for three and a half months and five months worth of provisions for a regular garrison. Because the entire Army of the Rhine was trapped in the fortress, the provisions only lasted for 41 days and the oats for 25. The Germans brought up 50 heavy siege guns from Germany to bombard Metz, but the fortress was too heavily stocked with artillery and well-built for it to be taken with the means available to the Germans. Unable to silence the fortress guns sufficiently to conduct siege operations, the besiegers opted to starve out the trapped French army. By September, about 25% of the 197,326-strong German siege force still lacked proper accommodations and the sick list in military hospitals grew to 40,000 men. The Germans supplemented their meat rations with tinned food. The French situation was much worse, with riots breaking out among the starving army and city residents.

The French attempted to break the siege first at Noisseville on 31 August – 1 September and again at Bellevue on 7 October but were repulsed each time. Each side lost about 5,000 total men killed and wounded in these two attempts.

On 20 October, the food provisions of the fortress ran out and the French Army of the Rhine subsisted afterward on the flesh of 20,000 horses, which were consumed at a rate of 1,000 per day. Bazaine was forced to surrender his entire army on 27 October because of starvation. The Prussians offered the honors of war to the defeated French army, but, contrary to usual practice, Bazaine refused.

On 29 October, Prussian flags were raised on Metz's outworks and the French Army of the Rhine marched out silently and in good order. They were taken prisoner by a Prussian Corps at each gate, put into bivouacs and supplied with food. The Germans allowed the French officers to keep their swords and remain in Metz, which was largely unharmed by the siege. The Germans immediately sent a train of food and live cattle to the city they had just conquered. The French prisoners were sent by way of Saarbrücken and Trier to prisoners of war camps, guarded by Landwehr battalions. Bazaine was sent as a captive to Kassel. The German 26th Brigade was stationed in Metz as garrison, with General von Kummer as commandant. Dead horses, unburied corpses and burnt or putrefying refuse greeted the German conquerors on their entry, a testament to the suffering the French had endured.

== Aftermath ==
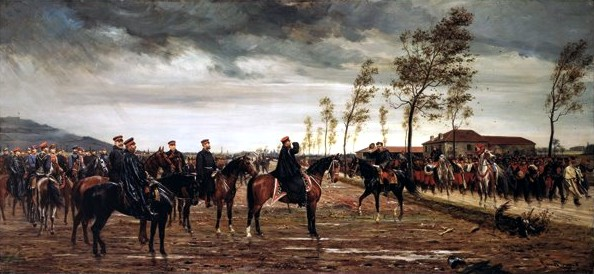
The Surrender of the French Army at Metz, Conrad Freyberg (1876)

Prince Friedrich Karl and the Prussian Second Army were now free to move against the French force in the Loire area. The siege is commemorated by the "Siegesmarsch von Metz" which uses parts of the "Die Wacht am Rhein". One notable figure present on the Prussian side was the prominent philosopher Friedrich Nietzsche, who served as a medical attendant. Nietzsche contracted both diphtheria and dysentery during the siege, worsening his already poor state of health.

=== Casualties ===
The French lost 167,000 enlisted men and 6,000 officers taken to prisoner-of-war camps on 27 October, as well as 20,000 sick who temporarily stayed behind in Metz. Material losses were enormous and amounted to 622 field guns, 2,876 fortress guns, 72 mitrailleuses, 137,000 chassepots, 123,000 other small arms, vast stores of ammunition and 56 French Imperial Eagles, all captured by the Germans. The Germans lost 5,500 enlisted men and 240 officers killed and wounded, as well as large numbers of sick.
