= Battle of Coulmiers =

Franco-Prussian War, 9 Nov 1870

Coordinates: 47°55′N 1°39′E

- Part of the Franco-Prussian War
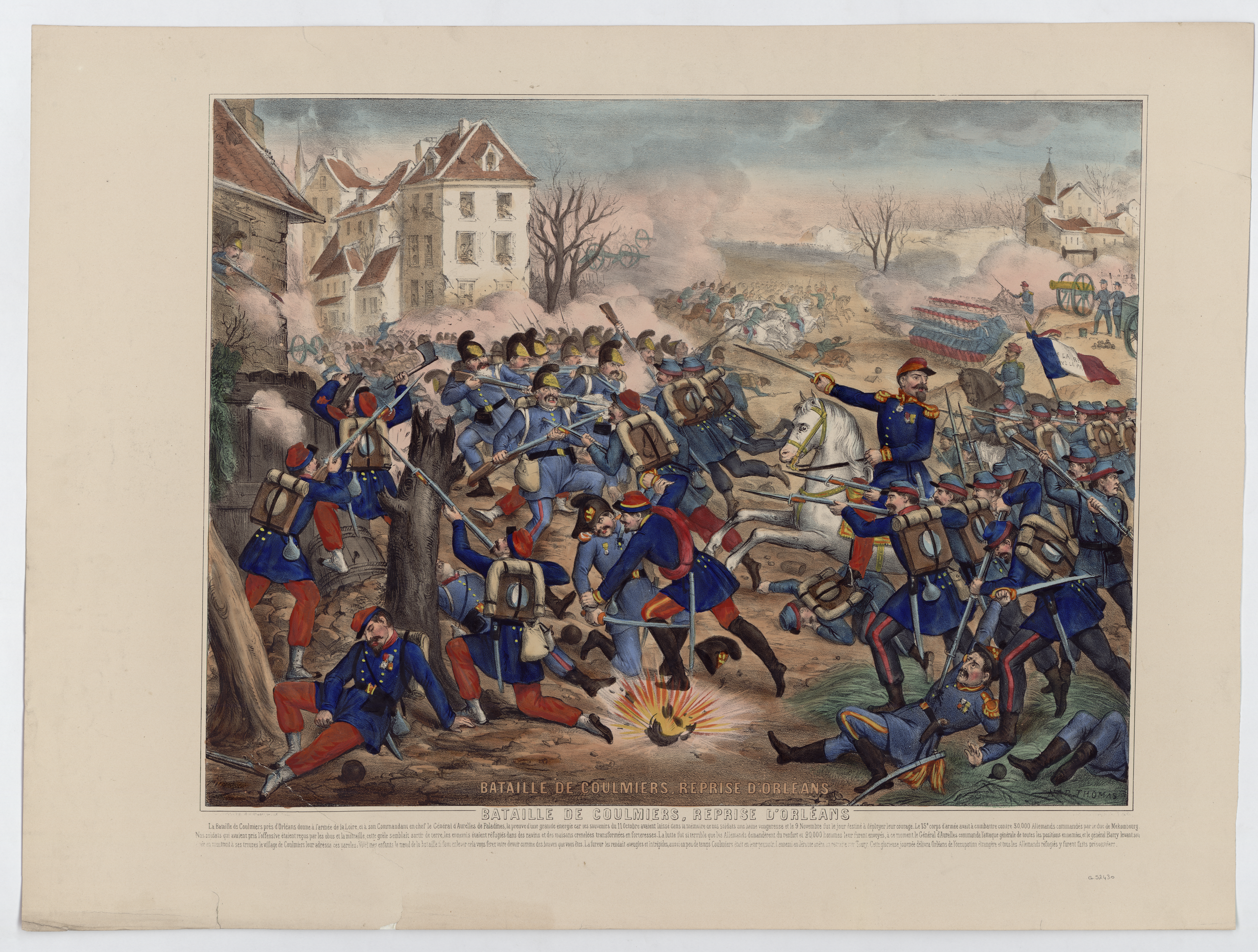
Date	9 November 1870
Location	Coulmiers, Loiret, France
Result	French victory

Belligerents
French Republic	Bavaria

Commanders and leaders
Jean-Baptiste d'Aurelle	Ludwig von der Tann

Strength
About 70,000 men	About 20,000 men

Casualties and losses
1,500 dead and wounded	1,112 soldiers and 54 officers, 1,000 prisoners

The Battle of Coulmiers was fought on 9 November 1870 between French and Bavarian forces during the Franco-Prussian War, ending in French victory.

== The struggle ==
The Army of the Loire, under General D'Aurelle de Paladines, surprised a Bavarian army under Ludwig Freiherr von und zu der Tann-Rathsamhausen at the village of Coulmiers, west of Orléans. The French artillery detachment shelled the Bavarian camp with percussion-fused shells, causing panic in the camp and causing the Bavarian garrison to retreat in disorder during a direct bayonet charge by French infantry. Forcing the Bavarian forces into retreating from the battlefield led to one of the very few French victories in the war.

== Aftermath ==
The news of Coulmiers was relayed to besieged Paris and caused great excitement in the city, prompting the Government of National Defense within the city to launch "the Great Sortie" against the Prussian siege lines around the city. At the same time, the Army of the Loire stopped its march towards Paris, conforming to the wishes of General D'Aurelle, who argued that his raw, badly-supplied men needed time to rest. Despite an urging Léon Gambetta, Aurelles locked himself into Orleans. Coulmiers's victory would not be exploited and reinforced German troops would eventually retake Orleans.
