= Armée de la Loire =

French army of the Franco-Prussian War

- The flag of the Second French Empire
- Active: 1870–1871
- Countries: Second French Empire; French Algeria
- Allegiance: France
- Branch: army
- Type: light infantry
- Engagements: Franco-Prussian War; Second Battle of Orléans Battle of Le Mans

The Armée de la Loire was a French army of the Franco-Prussian War. It was formed in October 1870 by Léon Gambetta, interior minister and minister for war in the Government of National Defence, then taking refuge in Tours after the French defeat at Sedan on 2 September 1870 had destroyed the Imperial field army. The newly raised force was formed out of francs-tireurs (volunteer irregulars), provincial Gardes Mobiles (territorials), naval forces, zouaves and tirailleurs from Algeria, plus regular soldiers in depots and reservists. Together these diverse units formed the 15th army corps under Joseph Édouard de la Motte Rouge. Apart from the North African units, the Army had few officers with fighting experience, insufficient artillery, and under-trained troops. It fought at the Battle of Orléans (1870) and Battle of Le Mans (1871) and was dissolved on 14 March 1871.

== Formation ==
The armée de la Loire was formed in the area south of the Loire River in October 1870 by the Government of National Defense. Its intended purpose was to advance north on the flank of the Prussian army besieging Paris and to lift the siege. The army was formed of two parts, one assembled near Blois that included the 16th and 17th Corps and one near Bourge and Vierzon which included the 18th and 20th Corps.

== Military operations ==
=== October–November 1870 ===
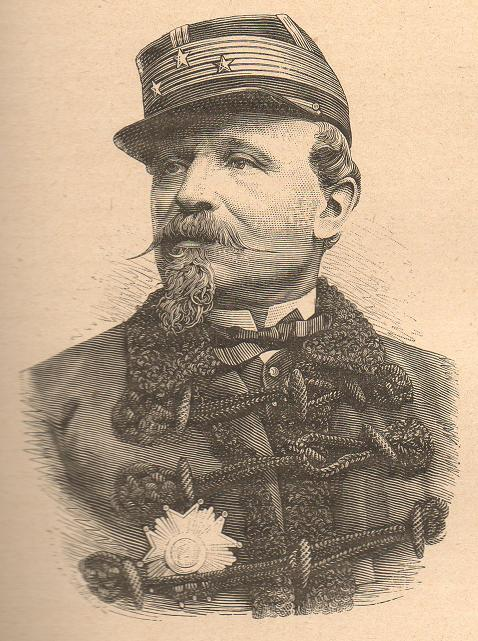
General Antoine Chanzy

On 10 October, at Artenay (Loiret), the armée de la Loire was defeated by the I Bavarian Korps (General von der Thann), protecting the south flank of the German forces besieging Paris. The armée had to abandon Orléans on 11 October and Léon Gambetta sacked La Motte-Rouge and replaced him with General Louis d'Aurelle de Paladines, who set up base in Salbris, in Sologne. The armée with 70,000 men and 150 guns reinforced the 16th Corps (General Antoine Chanzy) and the 17th Corps (General Louis-Gaston de Sonis). It beat the Bavarians at Coulmiers (Loiret) on 9 November and retook Orléans but the Bavarians were reinforced by Frederick Francis of Mecklenburg-Schwerin who had besieged Toul and later by the contingents of Prince Frederick Charles of Prussia, made available by the surrender of Marshal Bazaine at Metz (27 October). Gambetta reinforced the armée de la Loire with the 18th Corps (General Billot) and the 20th Corps (General Crouzat). The force was beaten on 28 November at the Battle of Beaune-la-Rolande (Loiret) by the Prussians and fell back on Orléans. On 1 and 2 December, the 16th and 17th corps were the victors at Villepion and Terminiers (1 December), against forces led by Prince Leopold of Bavaria but beaten at the Battle of Loigny-Poupry on 2 December. Orléans was re-taken by the Germans on 4 December in the Second Battle of Orléans.

=== December ===
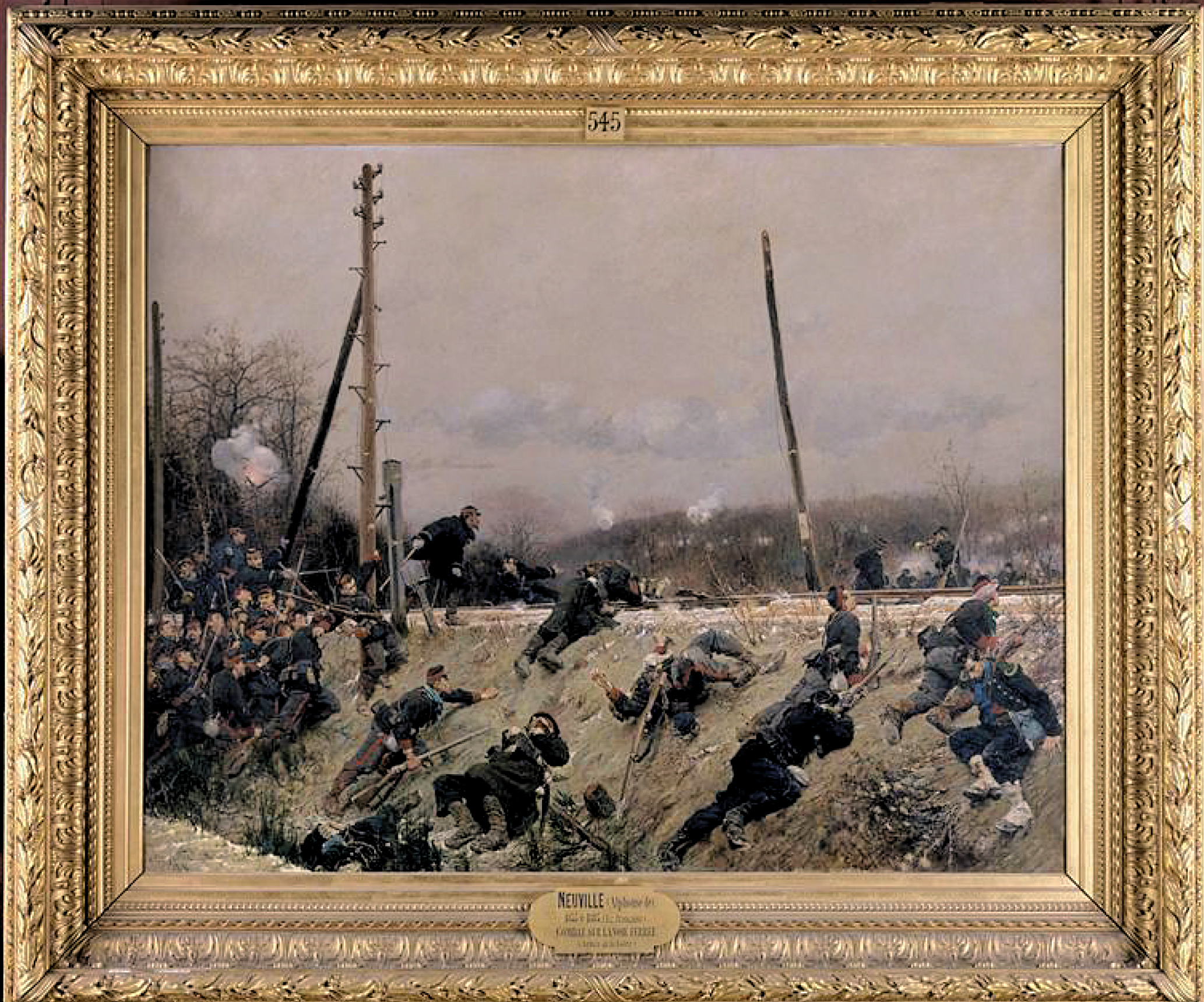
Alphonse de Neuville. Army of the Loire: Combat on a railway track. 1874

After the defeat at Loigny and the reoccupation of Orléans by the Germans on 4 December, the armée de la Loire found itself separated into two groups. Gambetta thus decided to reorganise its troops into two armées and to dismiss general d'Aurelle de Paladines. One part, regrouping 18th and 20th corps to form the Armée de l'Est, under General Bourbaki, was based at Gien and Salbris in order to send help to Belfort then resisting the Germans. The other part, 16th and 17th corps, commanded by Chanzy, set up base in Beaugency and thus became the second armée de la Loire. To it were also added the 19,000 poorly equipped troops left over from the closure of Camp Conlie in December 1870. It met the Prussians at Josnes and Villarceaux on 7 and 8 December, at Beaugency from 8–10 December, then at Fréteval and Château-du-Loir (Sarthe) on 14 and 15 December. Although reinforced by 21st corps under general Jaurès, it lost the battle of Le Mans to the south-west of Le Mans on 11 and 12 January 1871, with 7,000 of its troops dead or wounded, 22,000 captured and 50,000 deserters. The battles continued at Sillé-le-Guillaume (Sarthe) on 15 January and at Saint-Mélaine on 18 January. The armée thus retrenched behind the river Mayenne, until the armistice signed by the provisional government on 28 January 1871. On 14 March 1871 the armée was dissolved.
