= Von der Tann (gunboat) =

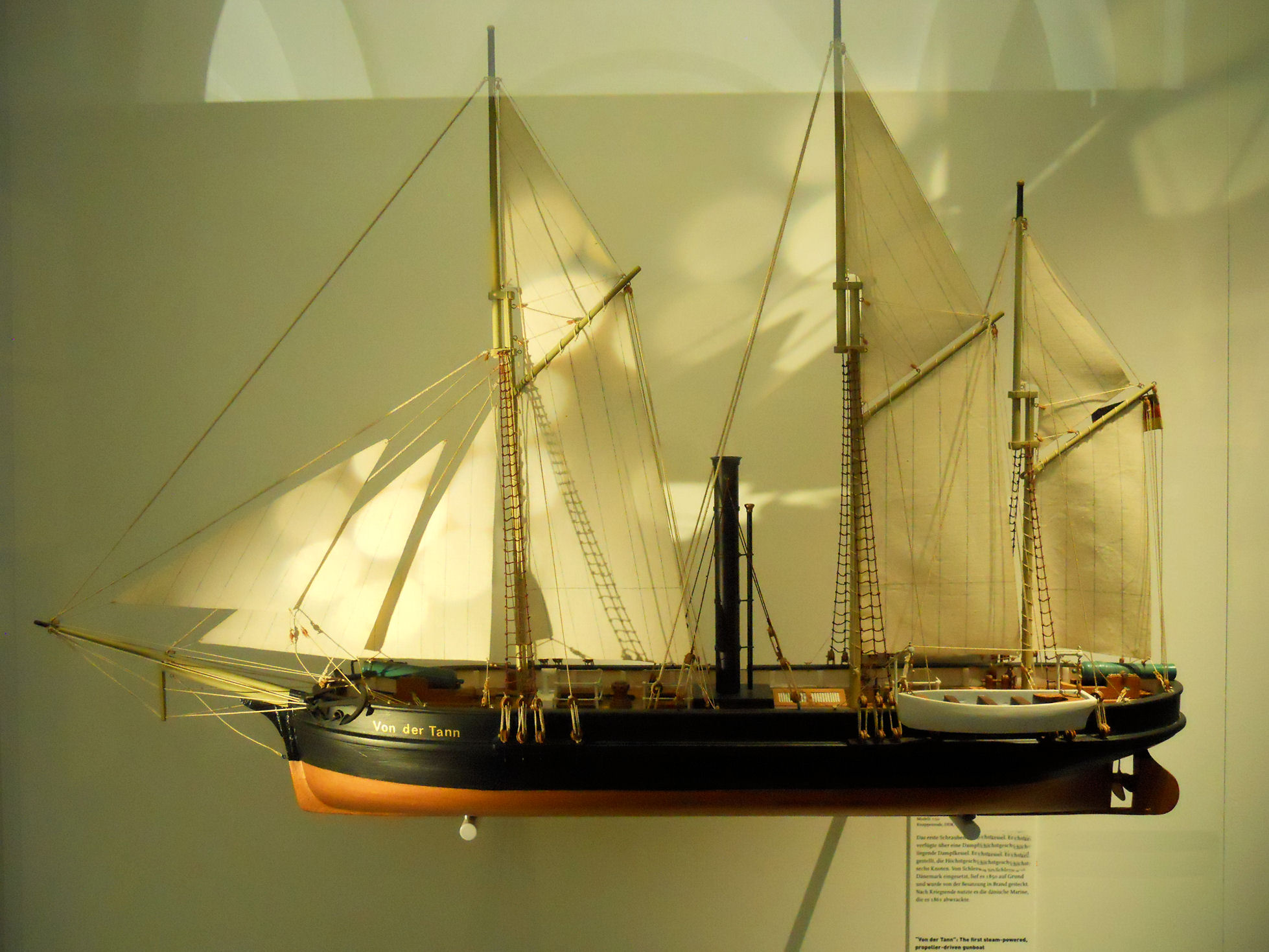
- Model of Von der Tann

History

Schleswig-Holstein
- Name: Von der Tann
- Namesake: Ludwig von der Tann
- Builder: Hilbert Shipyard, Kiel; Bernitt Shipyard, Neustadt in Holstein
- Laid down: 1848
- Acquired: 5 February 1849
- Renamed: Støren
- Stricken: 1860
- Fate: beached in action with Danish warships off Neustadt in Holstein in 1850; salvaged and rebuilt; surrendered to Danish Navy; in service as Støren until 1860

General characteristics
- Tons burthen: 120 t (120 long tons; 130 short tons) (rebuilt)
- Length: 25.1 m (82 ft 4 in) (original design); 31.3 m (102 ft 8 in) (rebuilt)
- Beam: 4.9 m (16 ft 1 in) (original design); 5.2 m (17 ft 1 in) (rebuilt)
- Draught: 1.83 m (6 ft 0 in)
- Depth of hold: 2.7 m (8 ft 10 in)
- Propulsion: 1 × two-cylinder expansion steam engine with 150 indicated horsepower (110 kW)
- Complement: 1 officer, 28 men
- Armament: 2 × 60-pounder smooth-bore bomb cannons

Von der Tann was a steam-powered 120 ton gunboat built in 1849 at Conradi shipyards in Kiel for the small joint navy of the two duchies of Schleswig and Holstein. She was the first propeller-driven gunboat in the world.

== History ==
During the First War of Schleswig, 1848–1850 between Denmark and the two duchies, the Schleswig-Holstein navy comprised three paddlewheelers with sail rigging, a schooner and 12 gunboats; their task was to protect the coast against Danish raids.

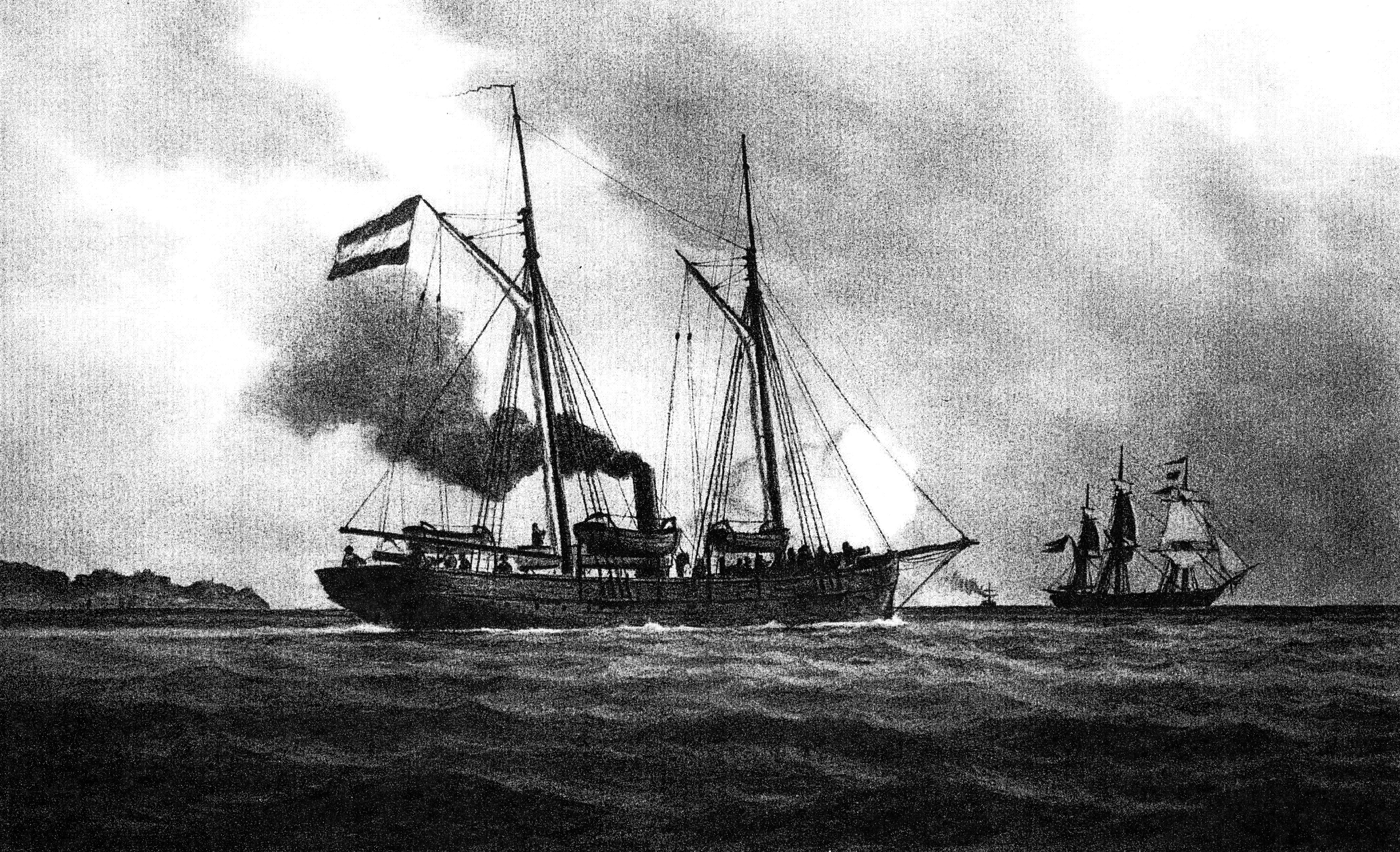
Von der Tann 1849. Painting by Lüder Arenhold, 1891

Initially called Gunboat No. 1, Von der Tann was the most modern of these ships. Her steam engine, built by August Howaldt at Schweffel und Howaldt's works in Kiel, gave her 36 horsepower (27 kW) and a top speed (under steam) of six knots. She carried the rigging of a three-mast schooner, with a very tall funnel behind the main mast. Her armament comprised two 64-pounder guns mounted on swivels fore and aft plus four three-pounder howitzers.

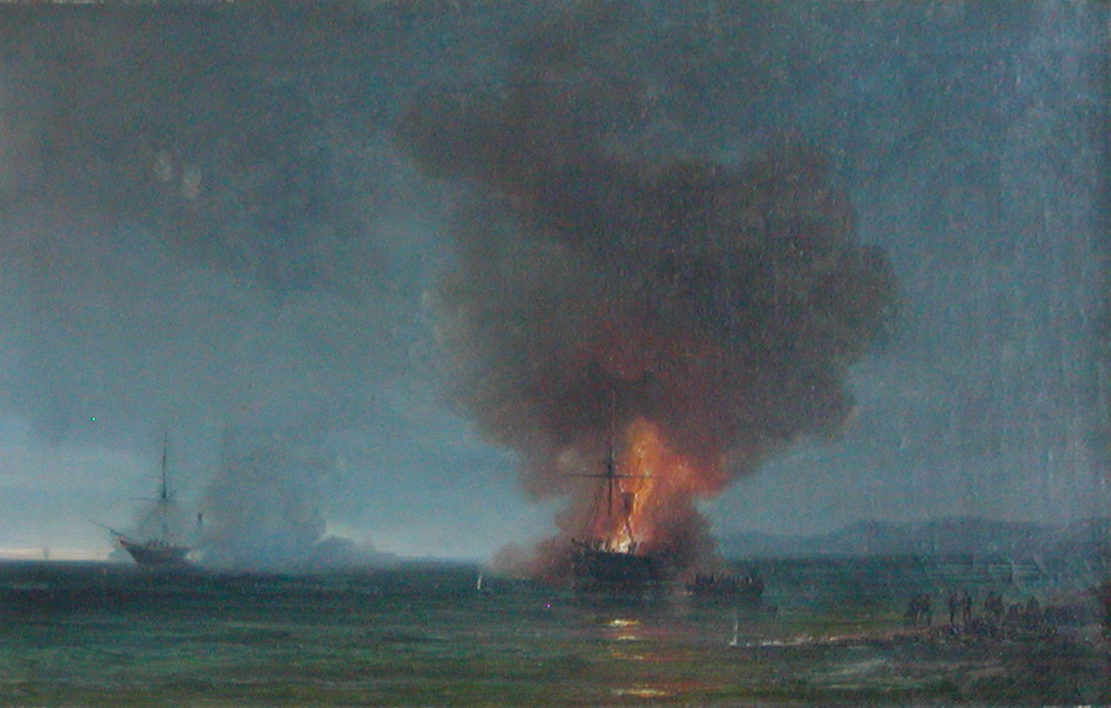
Vilhelm Melbye: Von der Tann aground at Neustadt. (The Hekla seen in the background)

During the night of 20/21 July 1850, Von der Tann had captured a Danish freighter in the bay of Lübeck, but was not permitted to enter the neutral port of Travemünde which belonged to the Free Hanseatic City of Lübeck. When Von der Tann attempted to enter the port of Neustadt in Holstein, she was engaged by Danish naval forces, the ships Heckla and Valkyren. During the ensuing battle, Von der Tann accidentally ran aground just outside Neustadt harbor. The ship was abandoned and set on fire by her crew, but was later repaired and put back into service. In 1853, after the end of the First War of Schleswig, Von der Tann was taken over by the Danish navy and renamed Støren. She was decommissioned and scrapped in 1862. The engine was reused in the gunboat Hauch.

== Legacy ==
A model and some pieces of wreckage are on display at the Ostholstein-Museum in Neustadt.

A later ship of the same name was the Imperial German battlecruiser SMS Von der Tann. Both were named after the Bavarian general Ludwig Freiherr von und zu der Tann-Rathsamhausen who, as a young officer, had organized and commanded the militia of Schleswig.
