= Louis d'Aurelle de Paladines =

French general (1804–1877)

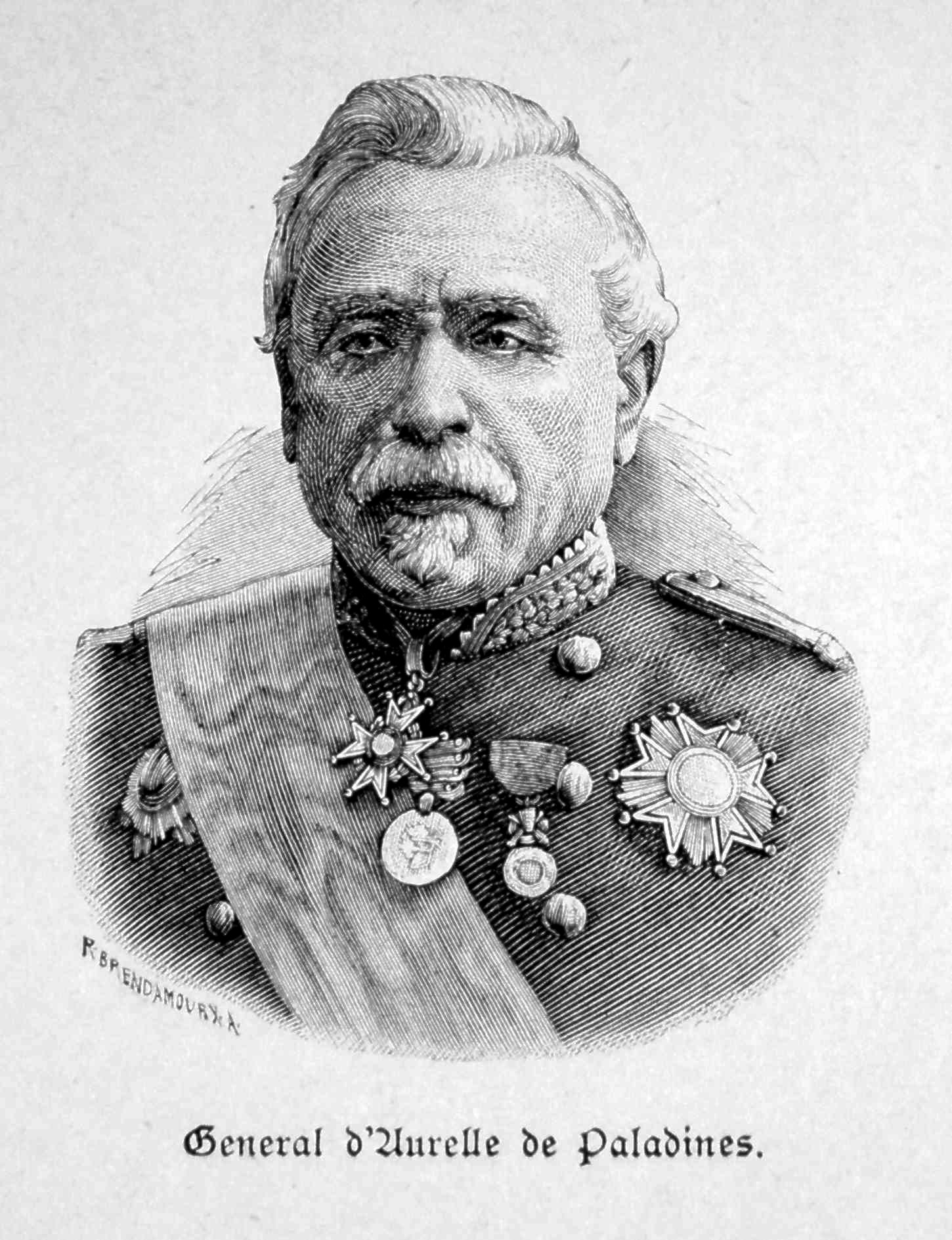
- Born: 9 January 1804; Le Malzieu-Ville, France
- Died: 17 December 1877 (aged 73); Versailles, France
- Military career
- Allegiance: Bourbon Restoration (France) July Monarchy; French Second Republic; Second French Empire; French Third Republic
- Branch: French Army
- Service years: 1824–1872
- Rank: Général de Division
- Conflicts: Conquest of Algeria; Crimean War; Franco-Austrian War; Franco-Prussian War
- Awards: Legion of Honour (Grand Croix)

Louis Jean-Baptiste d'Aurelle de Paladines (French pronunciation: [lwi ʒɑ̃ batist doʁɛl də paladin]; 9 January 1804 – 17 December 1877) was a French general.

== Life ==
He was born at Le Malzieu-Ville, Lozère, educated at the Prytanée National Militaire and St Cyr, and entered the army as sub-lieutenant of foot in 1824. He served with distinction in Algeria between 1841 and 1848, becoming lieutenant-colonel and an officer of the Legion of Honour; took part in the Roman campaigns of 1848 and 1849, and was made colonel.

He served as general of brigade throughout the Crimean War of 1854-56, being promoted general of division and commander of the Legion of Honour. During the campaign in Lombardy in 1859 he commanded at Marseille, and superintended the despatch of men and stores to the seat of war, and for his services he was made a grand officer of the Legion of Honour.

Placed on the reserve list in 1869, he was recalled to the Marseille command on the outbreak of the Franco-German War of 1870-71. After the first capture of Orléans by the Germans, he was appointed by the Government of National Defense, in November 1870, to the command of the Army of the Loire (notwithstanding his monarchist and catholic beliefs). He was at first very successful against von der Tann-Rathsamhausen, winning the battle of Coulmiers and compelling the Germans to evacuate Orléans, but the capitulation of Metz had set free additional German troops to oppose him, and, after his defeat at Beaune la Rolande and subsequent unsuccessful fighting near Orléans, resulting in its recapture by the Germans in December, Aurelle retreated into the Sologne and was superseded. After the government surrendered to Prussia in January 1871, General Paladines was appointed as head of the National Guard, whose members deeply resented having him as their commander.

After the armistice he was elected to the National Assembly by the departments both of Allier and Gironde. He sat for Allier as a member of the Centre gauche parliamentary group and was one of the fifteen officers chosen to assist in the peace negotiations. He was decorated with the grand cross of the Legion of Honour, and was given the command at Bordeaux, but retired in 1872. Elected a life senator in 1875, he supported the monarchical majority of 1876. He died at Versailles in 1877.

He was the author of La Première Armée de la Loire, published in 1872.
