= HDMS Hauch =

Danish gunboat (1862–1900)

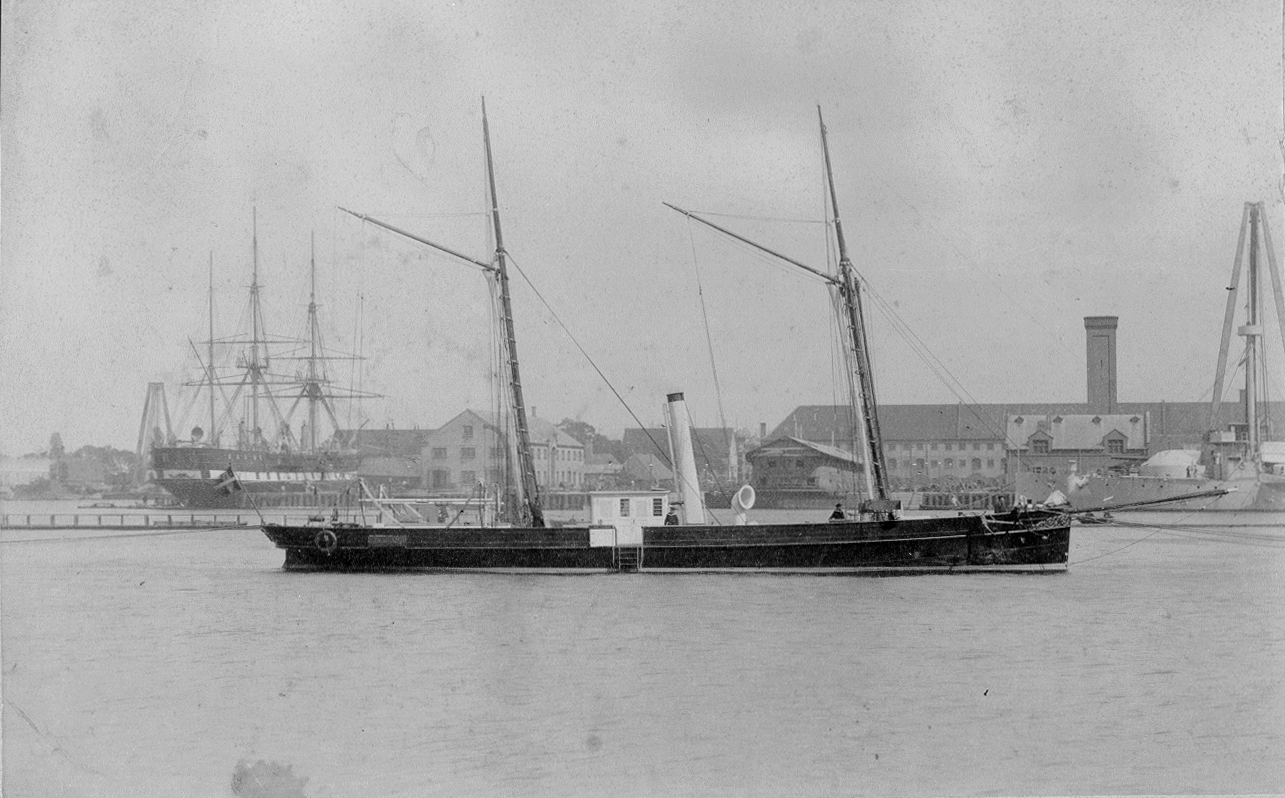
- HDMS Hauch outside Holmen, Copenhagen harbour

History

Denmark
- Name: HDMS Hauch
- Builder: Danish Naval Shipyard, Copenhagen
- Launched: 10 September 1862
- Commissioned: 6 July 1863
- Decommissioned: 22 November 1900
- Home port: Copenhagen
- Fate: Empty hull sold in 1901

General characteristics
- Class & type: Steam gunboat
- Length: 27.4 m (90 ft)
- Beam: 5 m (16 ft)
- Draught: 1.9 m (6.2 ft)
- Propulsion: 150 HP steam engine,1886: 200 HP steam engine.
- Speed: 10.9 knots (1886)
- Armament: 1 30 lb canon, changed to 18 lb canon in 1864; 4 x 4 pound howitzer

HDMS Hauch was a Danish gunboat, launched in 1862 and under command the following year. It was named after the naval officer Jens Erik Hauch, who died during the Battle of Copenhagen, while bravely defending the decommissioned frigate Kronborg against three Royal Navy ships of the line. Hauch can be viewed as a scaled-down version of the preceding six gunboats of the Thura class. Hauch was built entirely in iron and the smaller size meant that it could only accommodate a single cannon. The 30 lb smoothbore cannon was not very accurate and was replaced by a smaller, but rifled 18 lb cannon in 1864. Towards the end of her career the armament consisted of two small smoothbore cannons (falconets), used for warning shots during fisheries inspection duties. The steam engine was reused from the scrapped gunboat Støren. This engine lasted until 1886, when it was replaced by a new Burmeister & Wain 200 HP steam engine.

== Duty ==
Hauch, under command of Lieutenant William August Carstensen and a crew of 25 entered service in July 1863 as flagship of a steamship squadron of rear admiral C.E. van Dockum. The squadron consisted of HDMS Absalon, HDMS Esbern Snare, HDMS Fylla, HDMS Willemoes, HDMS Buhl, HDMS Krieger and HDMS Marstrand. However, the ship did not live up to expectations. It was first and foremost too slow, most likely due to the small length, as it was designed to fit the locks on the Eider Canal. The ship was under command of lieutenant Peter Urban Bruun with a crew of 24 during the second Schleswig War in 1864, but never engaged in fighting. After the war it was considered to sell the ship, but instead Hauch was placed on land for the next 16 years. Here she remained until 1880, where a need for a fisheries inspection vessel arose.

== Marine surveys ==
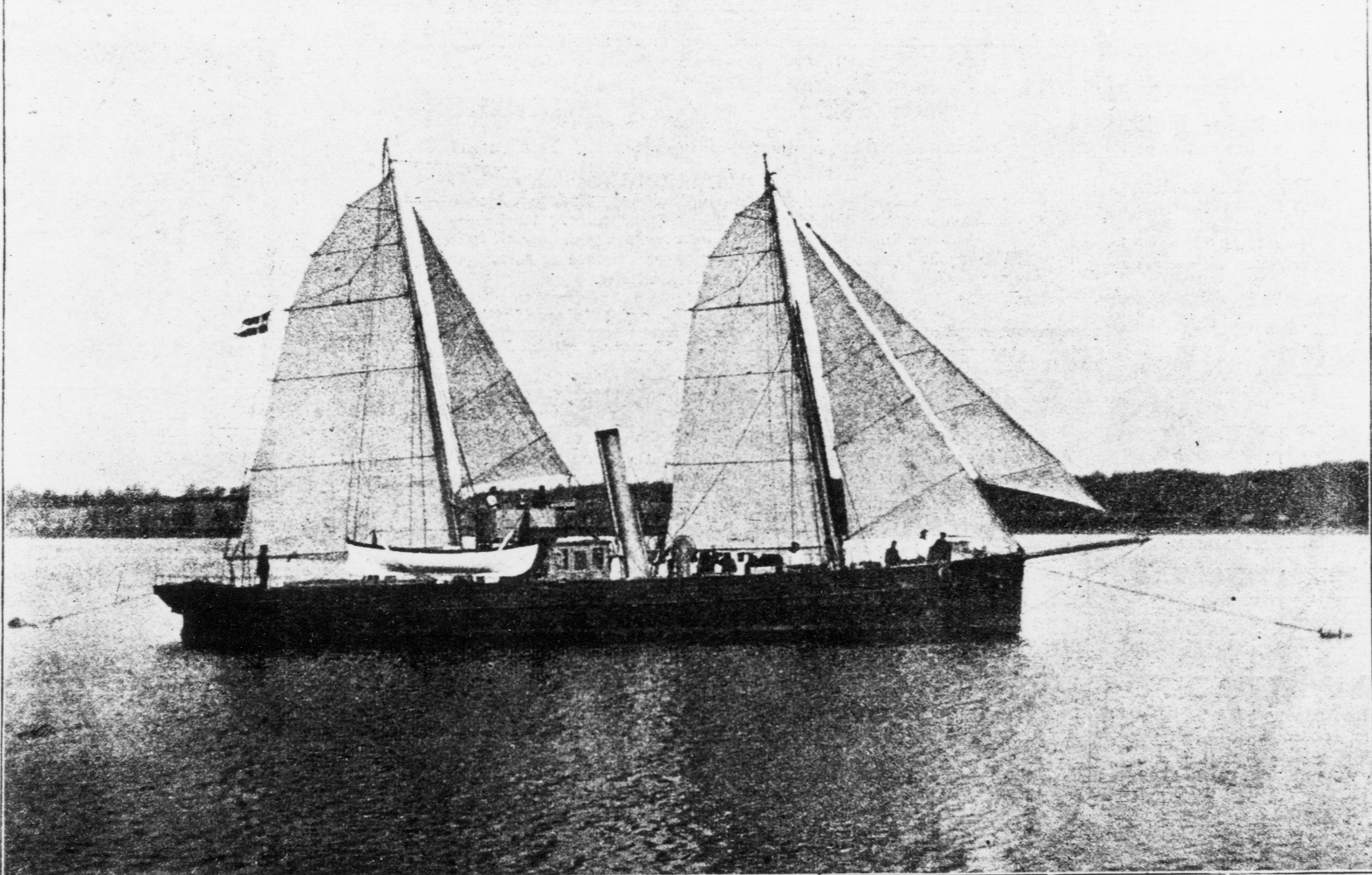
HDMS Hauch in her later years, where experiments with rigging her with sails were performed

Between 1880 and 1896 Hauch served as a fisheries inspection vessel for the Kattegat and Danish Straits, typically from March through November. The zoologist C.G. Johannes Petersen participated in many of the cruises, in particular in the years 1883-1886. This resulted in a report on the scientific results of the investigations, often seen as the first major contribution to the research field marine benthic ecology, as C.G. Johannes Petersen realised that there were pronounced patterns in the distribution of the different species. Certain species seemed to always occur together, which led him as the first to define the concept of a benthic community. Hauch was decommissioned in 1900. The engine was removed and reused in refitting the steam ferry Sallingsund into a fisheries research vessel. The hull of Hauch was sold for scrap in 1901 for 2,100 kroner.

In 1889, at the age of 14, the later Nobel-laureate August Krogh served as a voluntary 'marine intern' on Hauch.
