= Le Malzieu-Ville =

- Commune
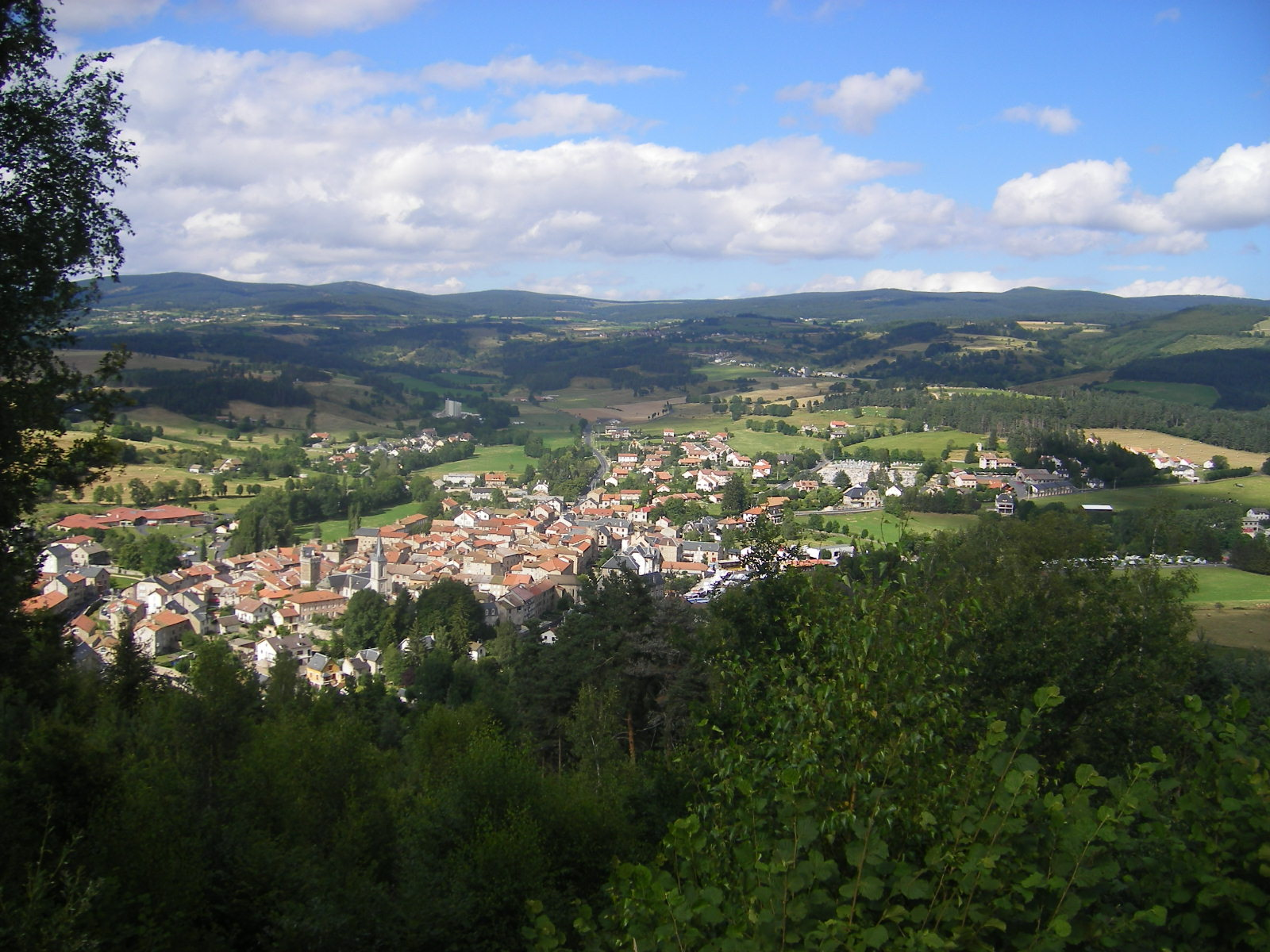
- View of Le Malzieu-Ville

- Coat of arms
- Location of Le Malzieu-Ville
- Location within France Location within Occitanie
- Coordinates: 44°51′25″N 3°19′53″E
- Country: France
- Region: Occitania
- Department: Lozère
- Arrondissement: Mende
- Canton: Saint-Alban-sur-Limagnole
- Intercommunality: Terres d'Apcher-Margeride-Aubrac

Government
  - Mayor (2020–2026): Jean-Noël Brugeron
- Area^{1}: 7.80 km^{2} (3.01 sq mi)
- Elevation: 860 m (2,820 ft)
- Highest elevation: 1,063 m (3,488 ft)
- Lowest elevation: 826 m (2,710 ft)
- Population (2023): 745
  - Density: 95.5/km^{2} (247/sq mi)
- Time zone: UTC+01:00 (CET)
  - Summer (DST): UTC+02:00 (CEST)
- INSEE/Postal code: 48090 /48140
- ^{1} French Land Register data, which excludes lakes, ponds, glaciers > 1 km^{2} (0.386 sq mi or 247 acres) and river estuaries.

Le Malzieu-Ville (French pronunciation: [lə malzjø vil]; Occitan: Lo Malasiu) is a commune in the Lozère department in southern France. It is a member of Les Plus Beaux Villages de France (The Most Beautiful Villages of France) Association. Notable features include medieval ramparts, a church, a tourist office, and a leisure park along the river Truyère.

== Demography ==
Historical population
Year	Pop.	±% p.a.
1968	794	—
1975	874	+1.38%
1982	924	+0.80%
1990	947	+0.31%
1999	970	+0.27%
2007	878	−1.24%
2012	793	−2.02%
2017	730	−1.64%
2023	745	+0.34%
Source: INSEE

== Notable people ==
- Vital de Lestang (1588-1621), Bishop of Carcassonne
- Louis Bertrand Pierre Brun de Villeret (1773-1845), General, born and died at Le Malzieu
- Louis d'Aurelle de Paladines (1804-1877), General, born at Le Malzieu

== See also ==
- Communes of the Lozère department
