= Coulmiers =

- Commune
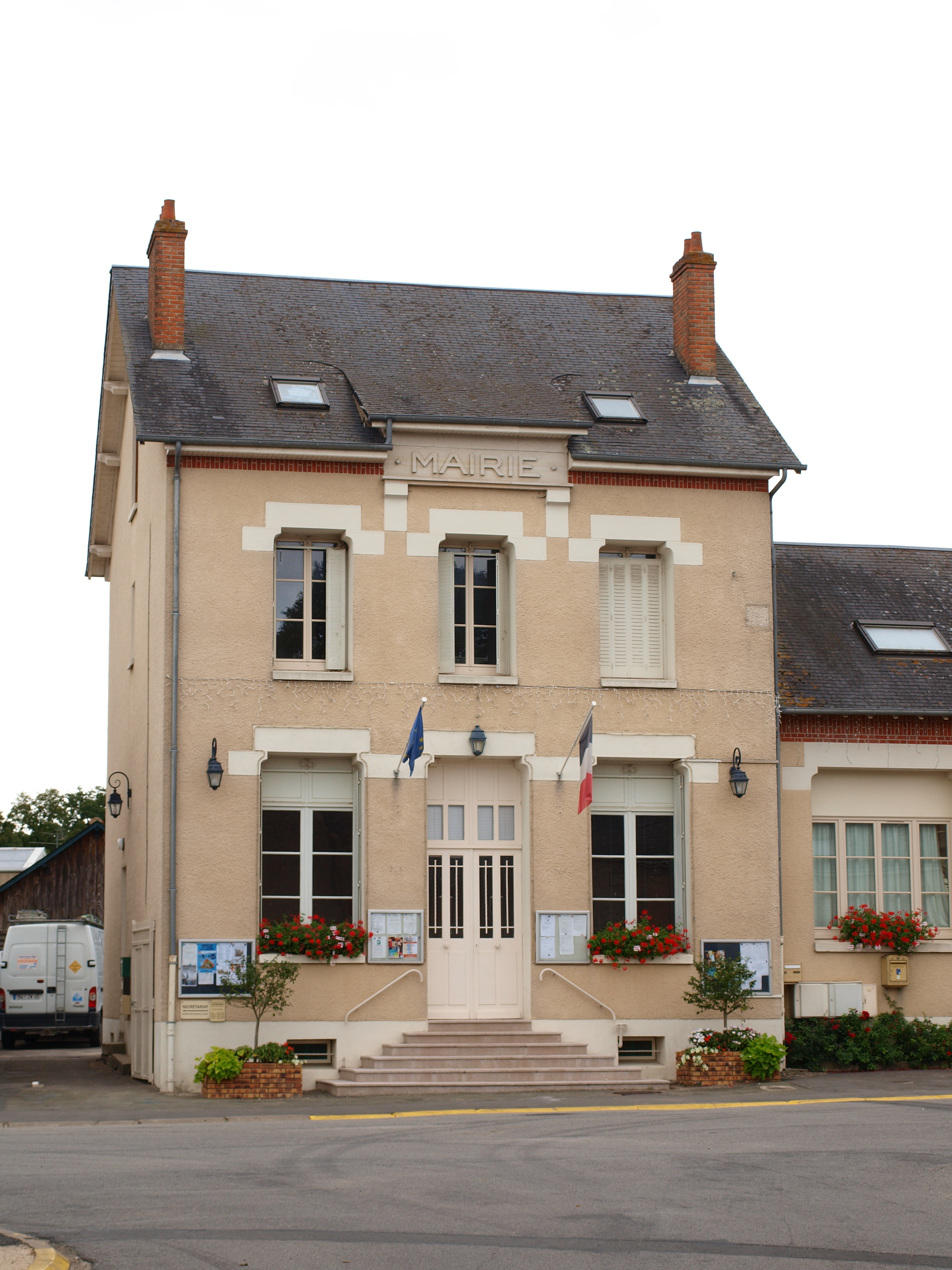
- The town hall in Coulmiers

- Coat of arms
- Location of Coulmiers
- Location within France Location within Centre-Val de Loire
- Coordinates: 47°55′56″N 1°39′52″E
- Country: France
- Region: Centre-Val de Loire
- Department: Loiret
- Arrondissement: Orléans
- Canton: Meung-sur-Loire

Government
  - Mayor (2020–2026): Elisabeth Manchec
- Area^{1}: 14.28 km^{2} (5.51 sq mi)
- Highest elevation: 121 m (397 ft)
- Lowest elevation: 108 m (354 ft)
- Population (2023): 576
  - Density: 40.3/km^{2} (104/sq mi)
- Demonym: Colmériens
- Time zone: UTC+01:00 (CET)
  - Summer (DST): UTC+02:00 (CEST)
- INSEE/Postal code: 45109 /45130
- ^{1} French Land Register data, which excludes lakes, ponds, glaciers > 1 km^{2} (0.386 sq mi or 247 acres) and river estuaries.

Coulmiers (French pronunciation: [kulmje]) is a commune in the Loiret department in north-central France.

== History ==
This was the site of the defeat of the Prussian Army in the Battle of Coulmiers, November 9, 1870.

== See also ==
- Communes of the Loiret department
