= SMS Von der Tann =

Battlecruiser of the German Imperial Navy

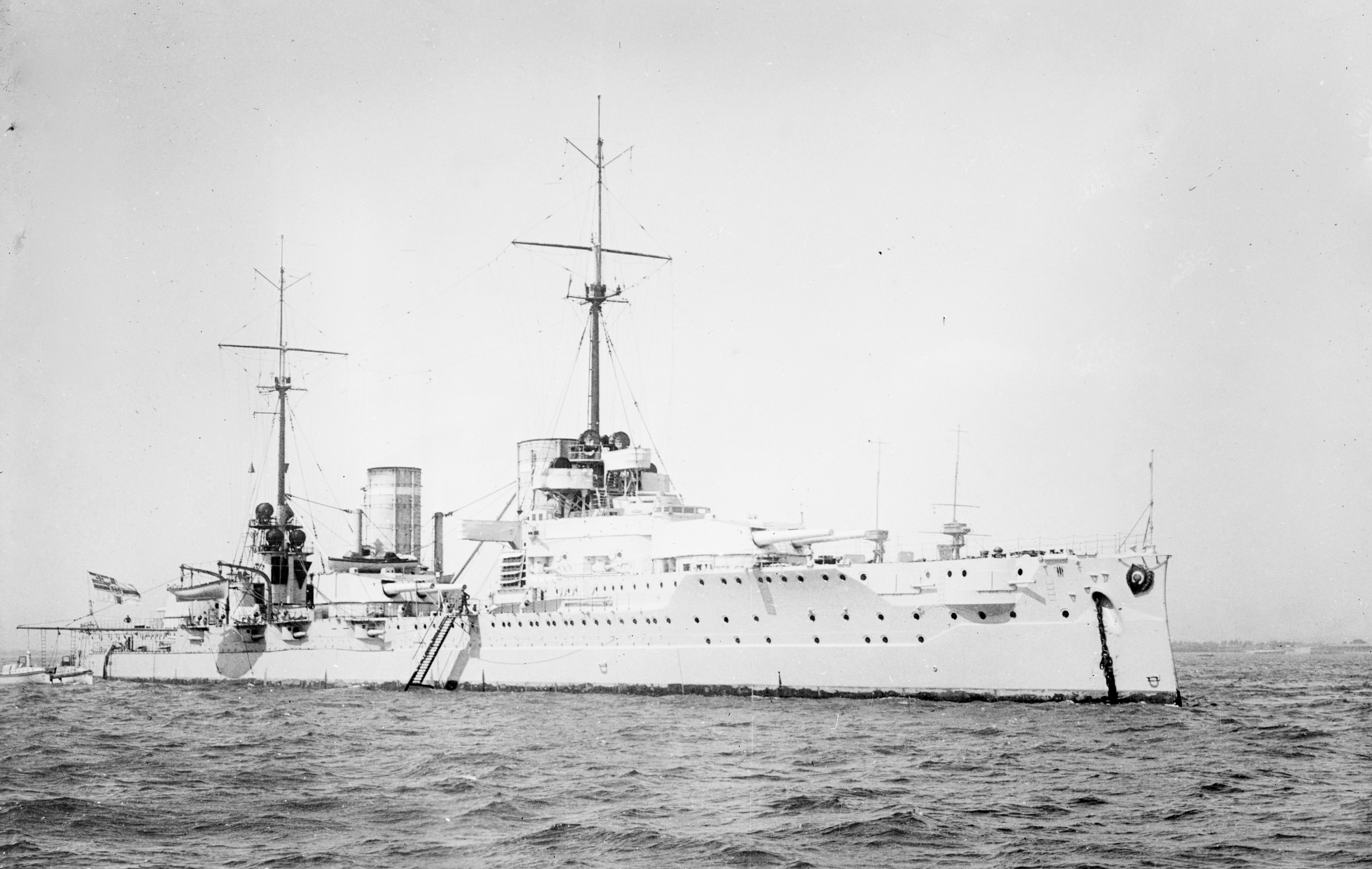
- Von der Tann before the war

Class overview
- Operators: Imperial German Navy
- Preceded by: None
- Succeeded by: Moltke class
- Completed: 1

History

German Empire
- Name: SMS Von der Tann
- Namesake: Ludwig von der Tann
- Ordered: 26 September 1907
- Builder: Blohm & Voss, Hamburg
- Laid down: 21 March 1908
- Launched: 20 March 1909
- Commissioned: 1 September 1910
- Fate: Scuttled at Scapa Flow on 21 June 1919, wreck raised December 1930 and scrapped at Rosyth.

General characteristics
- Type: Battlecruiser
- Displacement: Design: 19,370 t (19,060 long tons); Full load: 21,300 t (21,000 long tons)
- Length: 171.7 m (563 ft 4 in)
- Beam: 26.6 m (87 ft 3 in)
- Draft: Designed: 8.91 m (29 ft 3 in); Full load: 9.17 m (30 ft 1 in)
- Installed power: 18 Schulz-Thornycroft boilers; 41,426 shp (30,891 kW)
- Propulsion: 4 × Parsons steam turbines; 4 × screw propellers
- Speed: Design: 24.8 knots (45.9 km/h; 28.5 mph); Maximum: 27.75 knots (51.39 km/h; 31.93 mph)
- Range: 4,400 nmi (8,100 km; 5,100 mi) at 14 knots (26 km/h; 16 mph)
- Complement: 41 officers; 882 men
- Armament: 8 × 28 cm (11 in) SK L/45 guns; 10 × 15 cm (5.9 in) SK L/45 guns; 16 × 8.8 cm (3.5 in) SK L/45 guns; 4 × 45 cm (17.7 in) torpedo tubes
- Armor: Belt: 80 to 250 mm (3.1 to 9.8 in); Turret faces: 230 mm (9.1 in); Conning tower: 250 mm (9.8 in); Torpedo bulkhead: 25 mm (0.98 in)

SMS Von der Tann (Note: "SMS" stands for "Seiner Majestät Schiff ", or "His Majesty's Ship" in German.) was the first battlecruiser built for the German Kaiserliche Marine (Imperial Navy), as well as Germany's first major turbine-powered warship. At the time of her construction, Von der Tann was the fastest dreadnought-type warship afloat, capable of reaching speeds in excess of 27 knots (50 km/h; 31 mph). She was designed in response to the British Invincible class. While the German design had slightly lighter guns—28 cm (11 in), (Note: The measurements used here and elsewhere in the article refer to the diameter of the bore of the gun.) compared to the 30.5 cm (12 in) Mark X mounted on the British ships—Von der Tann was faster and significantly better-armored. She set the precedent of German battlecruisers carrying much heavier armor than their British equivalents, albeit at the cost of smaller guns.

Von der Tann participated in a number of fleet actions during the First World War, including several bombardments of the English coast. She was present at the Battle of Jutland, where she destroyed the British battlecruiser HMS Indefatigable in the opening minutes of the engagement. Von der Tann was hit several times by large-caliber shells during the battle, and at one point in the engagement, the ship had all of her main battery guns out of action either due to damage or malfunction. Nevertheless, the damage was quickly repaired and the ship returned to the fleet in two months.

Following the end of the war in November 1918, Von der Tann, along with most of the High Seas Fleet, was interned at Scapa Flow pending a decision by the Allies as to the fate of the fleet. The ship met her end in 1919 when German caretaker crews scuttled their ships to prevent their division among Allied navies. The wreck was raised in 1930, and scrapped at Rosyth from 1931 to 1934.

== Development ==
=== Background ===
HMS Indomitable, one of the Invincible-class battlecruisers that prompted Von der Tann's design

The genesis of the battlecruiser Von der Tann began on 17 May 1906 with an order from Kaiser Wilhelm II for a design competition for a fast battleship that combined the speed of earlier armored cruisers with the firepower of a battleship. Wilhelm directed that the new ship should have a primary armament of at least four 28 cm (11 in) guns and a top speed of at least 3 knots (5.6 km/h; 3.5 mph) faster than the latest battleships. He envisioned the new ship forming a fast division of the main fleet, which could also perform reconnaissance duties. He stated that the Nassau-class battleships then under development should be used as a basis for the new ship. Admiral Alfred von Tirpitz, then the State Secretary of the Reichsmarineamt (Imperial Navy Office), opposed the concept for a number of reasons, but the announcement on 31 May that the British Royal Navy's latest armored cruisers, the Invincible class, would be armed with eight 30.5 cm (12 in) guns brushed aside Tirpitz's objections.

The Kaiser's design competition could not be carried out, as the navy's design department was already busy completing work on what would become the Nassau class of dreadnought battleships. They would also soon need to begin work on the next armored cruiser, designated "F", to follow the latest cruiser Blücher, which was to be laid down in early 1907. But the Kaiser and his supporters would nevertheless significantly shape the project for cruiser "F". The General Navy Department agreed that future armored cruisers must be capable of fighting in the line of battle as a fast wing, which required battleship-grade armament. They suggested a ship armed with six or eight 28 cm (11 in) guns and capable of 23 knots (43 km/h; 26 mph). (Note: In comparison, the battleship counterparts of the Nassau class were armed with twelve of the guns and had a top speed of 19 knots (35 km/h; 22 mph).) Arguments continued, including the publication of an article in the journal Marine-Rundschau in July 1906 by Waldemar Vollerthun, who argued that the two types—battleships and armored cruisers—were fundamentally incompatible due to their differing tactical roles.

Senior officers disagreed over the intended role of the new ship; Tirpitz envisioned the new ship as a replication of the British Invincibles, mounting heavier guns, lighter armor, and higher speed with the intention of using the ship as a fleet scout and to destroy the opposing fleet's cruisers. Tirpitz had no intention of using the ship in the main battle line. Wilhelm II however, along with most of the RMA, was in favor of incorporating the ship into the battle line after initial contact was made, which necessitated much heavier armor. The insistence upon the capability to fight in the battle line was a result of the numerical inferiority of the German High Seas Fleet to the Royal Navy. Initial proposals suggested a main battery of 30.5 to 34.3 cm (12.0 to 13.5 in) guns, but financial limitations necessitated the use of smaller, less expensive weaponry. The same 28 cm twin-gun turrets that had been developed for the last two Nassau-class battleships would be used for cruiser "F". (Note: German warships were ordered under provisional names. Additions to the fleet were given a single letter; ships intended to replace older or lost vessels were ordered as "Ersatz (name of the ship to be replaced)".)

=== Design preparation ===
As the reality of the British introduction of the battlecruiser type sank in over the summer of 1906, Tirpitz eventually concluded on 18 July that he could no longer maintain his objections for military and political reasons. He instructed the General Navy Department, Construction Department, and the Weapons Department to prepare designs for a new cruiser armed with eight 30.5 cm guns, along with a new battleship armed with twelve of the guns. The projected cost of the former led Tirpitz to quickly abandon it, while latter became the Helgoland class. But on 4 September, he requested another cruiser design, this time with the armament scaled back to 28 cm guns. Other requirements included a secondary battery of eight or ten 15 cm (5.9 in) guns, displacement and price no greater than Nassau, and improved armor protection compared to Blücher.

Blücher, the previous German armored cruiser

Several proposals were presented in a meeting on 15 September, which resolved many of the disagreements over the ship's design. Rudolf von Eickstedt, the naval architect in charge of the Construction Department, argued that since the explosive trials for the proposed protection systems for Blücher had not been completed, the construction should be postponed to allow for any alterations to the design for cruiser "F". He also argued that guns of 21 cm or 24 cm (9.4 in) caliber would be sufficient to penetrate the armor of the new British battlecruisers. However, Admiral August von Heeringen, of the General Navy Department, stated that for the ship to be able to engage battleships, the 28 cm guns were necessary. Admiral Eduard von Capelle, the deputy director of the RMA, stated that depending on tests of the underwater protection system slated to be carried out in November, the main battery might have to be reduced in caliber to offset the weight of any improvements to the protection system that might need to be made. Tirpitz rejected the idea of a reduction in caliber, even if it required increasing displacement over the agreed-upon 19,000 metric tons (18,700 long tons).

Among the preliminary designs were options that carried the secondary guns either in four twin-gun turrets or in casemates in a central battery. Those proposals with turret-mounted secondary guns were rejected, leaving two for further consideration: Project I and Project II. The former carried its main guns in two twin turrets, fore and aft, and four single turrets, two per side amidships. Project II carried its guns in four twin turrets, two of which were amidships. Eickstedt submitted a competing proposal for a ship with six 28 cm guns and a secondary battery of 17 cm (6.7 in) guns. These would have been mounted on the centerline, which provided the same broadside as the other two designs, but at about 800 t (790 long tons; 880 short tons) less displacement. Tirpitz rejected the idea, citing the political problem of responding to an eight-gun British ship with a six-gun German vessel.

By 28 September, the design staff had submitted three basic arrangements to the Kaiser: "1a", with two twin turrets and four single turrets; "2a", with four twin turrets; and "5a", with three twin turrets on the centerline and two single mounts in forward wing positions. All three variants mounted their secondary guns in a casemate battery. The Kaiser approved "2a", which the design staff continued to refine, producing "2b" by moving the wing turrets to an en echelon arrangement that provided a theoretical broadside of all eight guns (though severe blast effects prevented this in practice). During a meeting on 7 November, the navy's senior leadership reviewed the two proposals, along with an updated version of "5a"; the General Navy Department preferred the greater firepower granted by "5a", and cited the blast effects in their objection to "2b". Tirpitz argued that "5a" would require a significant increase in displacement to match the speed of "2b". He and Eickstedt settled on "2b" as their preferred design, which finally settled the matter. At the same meeting the decision was made to switch from triple-expansion steam engines to steam turbines for the propulsion system, which would increase speed to 24 knots (44 km/h; 28 mph); this produced the "2a_{1}" variant; improvements to the protection scheme and increases to the designed horsepower resulted in the final version, "2c_{1}".

On 22 June 1907, the Kaiser authorized construction of cruiser "F", to be named Von der Tann, after Ludwig Freiherr von und zu der Tann-Rathsamhausen, a Bavarian general who fought in the Franco-Prussian War of 1870. The contract was awarded to the Blohm & Voss shipyard in Hamburg on 26 September 1907. The ship cost 36.523 million Marks, an increase of thirty-three percent over Blücher and a doubling of the price of the previous armored cruiser Scharnhorst. The significant increases in price caused major problems for the German fleet, as the Naval Laws that governed the construction program assumed that prices would remain fairly stable over time.

== Design ==
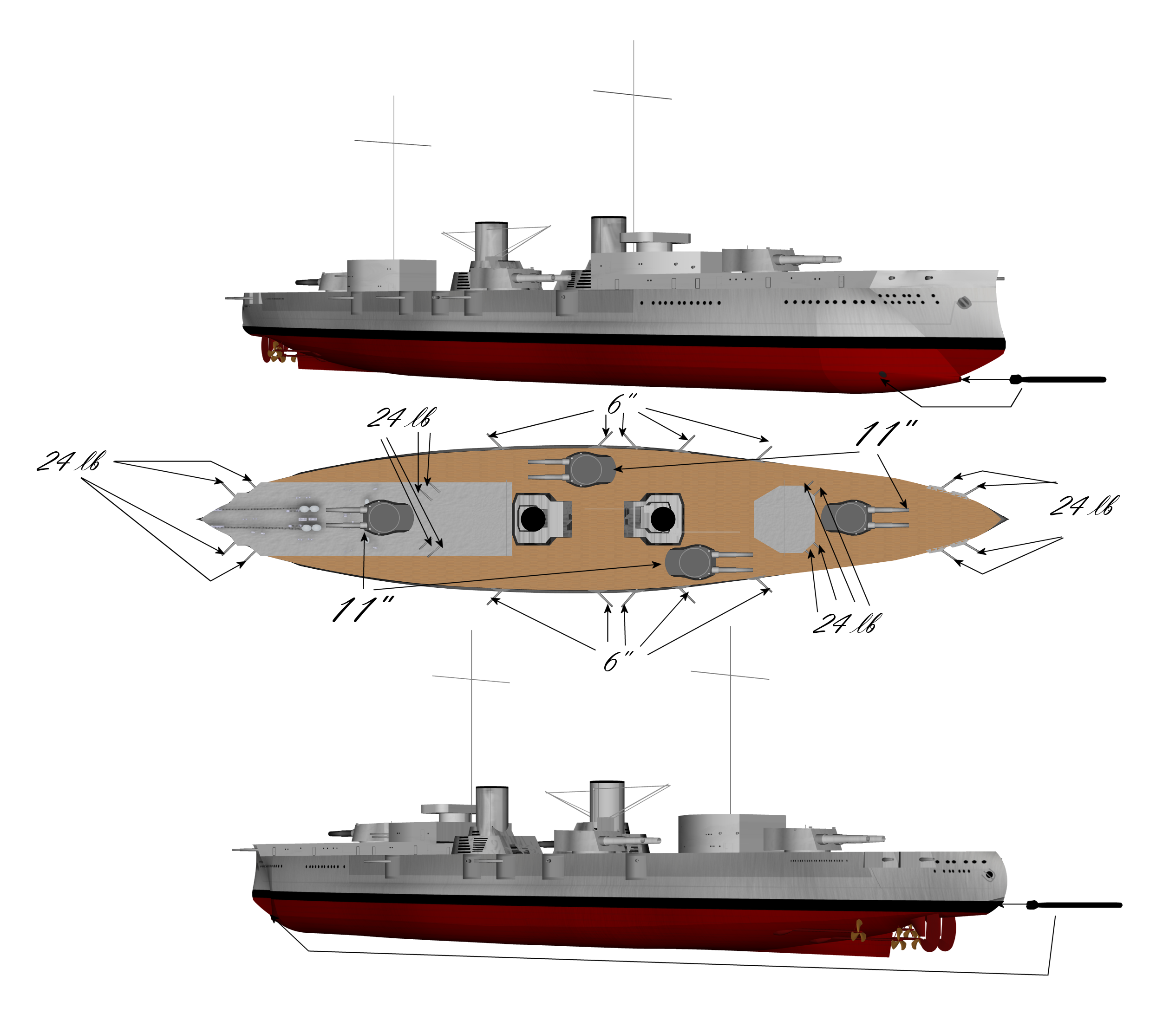
CG-rendering of Von der Tann

=== General characteristics ===
Von der Tann was 171.5 m (562 ft 8 in) long at the waterline and 171.7 m (563 ft 4 in) long overall. She had a beam of 26.6 m (87 ft 3 in), which was increased to 27.17 m (89 ft 2 in) with the installation of anti-torpedo nets. Her draft measured 8.91 m (29 ft 3 in) forward and 9.17 m (30 ft 1 in) aft. She displaced 19,370 metric tons (19,060 long tons) as designed and up to 21,300 t (21,000 long tons) at full load. Her hull was constructed with transverse and longitudinal steel frames and was divided into fifteen watertight compartments, with a double bottom that ran for 75 percent of the length of the hull.

The ship was a good sea boat with gentle motion, though she had a slight weather helm. Steering was controlled by a pair of rudders placed side by side. She was difficult to control while steaming in reverse. With the rudder hard over, she lost up to sixty percent speed and heeled up to eight degrees. Frahm anti-roll tanks were fitted during construction, but these proved to be ineffective and they only reduced rolling by 33%. Bilge keels were later added to improve stability, and the space previously used for the anti-roll tanks was instead used as extra fuel storage. The ship was able to carry an additional 180 t (200 short tons) of coal in the voids used by the anti-roll tanks.

The ship's crew compartments were arranged such that the officers were accommodated in the forecastle. This arrangement was found to be unsatisfactory, and not repeated in later classes. Interior decks were covered with linoleum, while exposed decks received 60 mm (2.4 in) of teak planking. Von der Tann was designed to be fitted with a lattice mast, but the ship was completed with standard pole masts instead. In 1914, spotting posts were attached to the masts in order to observe the fall of artillery fire. The ship was equipped with eight searchlights for use in night fighting; four were placed on the forward and aft conning towers apiece. In 1915, seaplane trials were conducted on Von der Tann, and a crane was attached on the aft deck to lift the seaplane aboard the ship. Early in her career, Von der Tann was equipped with anti-torpedo nets, but these were removed towards the end of 1916.

=== Machinery ===
Von der Tann on her speed trials in 1910

Von der Tann was the first large German warship to use steam turbines. Her propulsion system consisted of four steam turbines arranged in two sets: high pressure turbines, which ran the outer two shafts, and low pressure turbines, which powered the inner two shafts. Each shaft drove a 3-bladed screw propeller that was 3.6 m (12 ft) in diameter. The turbines were divided into three engine rooms. Steam for the turbines was provided by eighteen coal-fired double-ended water-tube boilers that were split into five boiler rooms. The boilers were ducted into two widely spaced funnels, one just aft of the fore mast and the other amidships.

Her engines were rated at 42,000 metric horsepower (41,000 shp) for a top speed of 24 knots (44 km/h; 28 mph), though on sea trials she significantly exceeded both figures, reaching 79,007 metric horsepower (77,926 shp) for 27.4 knots (50.7 km/h; 31.5 mph). In one instance during a cruise from Tenerife to Germany, the ship averaged 27 knots (50 km/h; 31 mph) for an extended period, and reached a maximum speed of 28 knots (52 km/h; 32 mph). At the time of her launch, she was the fastest dreadnought-type warship afloat. She had a designed coal storage capacity of 1,000 t (980 long tons) but at full load, could carry up to 2,600 t (2,600 long tons). This enabled a cruising radius of 4,400 nautical miles (8,100 km; 5,100 mi) at 14 knots (26 km/h; 16 mph). Von der Tann's electrical plant consisted of six turbo generators that had a total output of 1,200 kW (1,600 hp) at 225 volts.

Like many German capital ships, (Note: The higher quality coal was generally reserved for the smaller craft, whose crews were less able to clean the boilers at the increased rate demanded by the low-quality coal. As a result, German capital ships were often supplied with poor coal, in the knowledge that their larger crews were better able to perform the increased maintenance.) Von der Tann had chronic problems with the often low-quality coal available for the ship's boilers. Following the end of the raid on Scarborough, Von der Tann's commander, Captain Max von Hahn, remarked that "the inadequacy of our coal and its burning properties results in heavy smoke clouds and signals our presence." During the battle of Jutland, the ship was unable to maintain fires in all of her boilers after 16:00, due to the poor quality coal. Many other German ships suffered the same difficulties during the battle, including Derfflinger and Seydlitz. After 1916, the coal firing in the boilers was supplemented by spraying tar-oil on the coal, which improved the combustion rate.

=== Armament ===
Von der Tann's forward turret

Von der Tann carried eight 28 cm (11 in) SK L/45 (Note: In Imperial German Navy gun nomenclature, "SK" (Schnelladekanone) denotes that the gun is quick firing, while the L/45 denotes the length of the gun. In this case, the L/45 gun is 45 caliber, meaning that the gun is 45 times long as it is in diameter.) guns, mounted in four twin-gun turrets: one fore, one aft, and two staggered wing turrets. The wing turrets were staggered en echelon, allowing all eight guns to fire on either broadside over a wide arc. The guns were emplaced in the C/1907 turntable mount, which was traversed electrically, while the guns themselves used hydraulics to change elevation. The guns could be elevated up to 20 degrees, which enabled a maximum range of 18,900 m (20,700 yd). A refit in 1915 increased this to 20,400 m (22,300 yd). The main guns fired a 302 kg (670 lb) armor-piercing shell that had a muzzle velocity of 875 m/s; the main propellant charges were encased in a brass cartridge. A total of 660 projectiles were stored in four shell rooms, each containing 165 shells. These shells were fitted with caps to improve armor penetration; at a range of 10,000 m (10,940 yd), the shells were expected to penetrate 280 mm (11 in) of nickel steel. At a range of 12,000 m (13,120 yd), penetration fell to 200 mm (7.9 in). Barrel life was expected to be around 200 firings before the guns needed to be relined.

Unlike her British contemporaries, Von der Tann also carried a heavy secondary battery, consisting of ten 15 cm (5.9 in) SK L/45 guns, casemated in C/06 pivot mounts, each with 100 high explosive and 50 armor-piercing shells. At construction, these guns could fire their 45.3 kg (100 lb) shells at targets up to 13,500 m (14,800 yd) away; after the 1915 refit, their maximum range was extended to 16,800 m (18,400 yd). Their expected rate of fire was six to eight shells per minute. Aiming was conducted using a pair of telescopic sights per gun. The gun crews numbered eight men per weapon.

She was also armed with sixteen 8.8 cm (3.5 in) SK L/45 guns, to defend against torpedo boats and destroyers. These were also emplaced in pivot mounts, of the C/01-06 type, with a total of 3,200 shells for these guns. The ammunition came in self-contained cartridges, unlike the larger guns that used separate shells and propellant charges. These guns fired a 9 kg (20 lb) shell at the high rate of 25 to 30 rounds per minute, up to a range of 10,694 m (11,695 yd), which was quite long for a smaller caliber weapon. It was found that these guns could rarely be used, as they either suffered from interference from the main and secondary batteries, or they were washed out by the bow or stern waves. In late 1916, following repair work after the damage sustained during the Battle of Jutland, Von der Tann had her 8.8 cm (3.5 in) guns removed and the firing ports welded shut. Four 8.8 cm flak guns were installed on the aft superstructure before Jutland, but two were later removed.

As was customary for capital ships of the time, (Note: German tactical doctrine emphasized the belief that major naval battles would quickly devolve into a close range action, and potentially into an uncontrolled melee; under these predicted conditions, capital ships would need to be able to launch torpedoes at their opponents.) Von der Tann was equipped with four 45 cm (17.7 in) torpedo tubes, with a total of eleven torpedoes. These were located in the bow, the stern, and two on the broadside, all below the waterline. The torpedoes carried a 110 kg (240 lb) warhead, and had an effective range of 2 km (1.04 nmi) when set for a speed of 32 kn (59 km/h), and 1.5 km (0.81 nmi) at 36 kn (67 km/h).

=== Armor ===
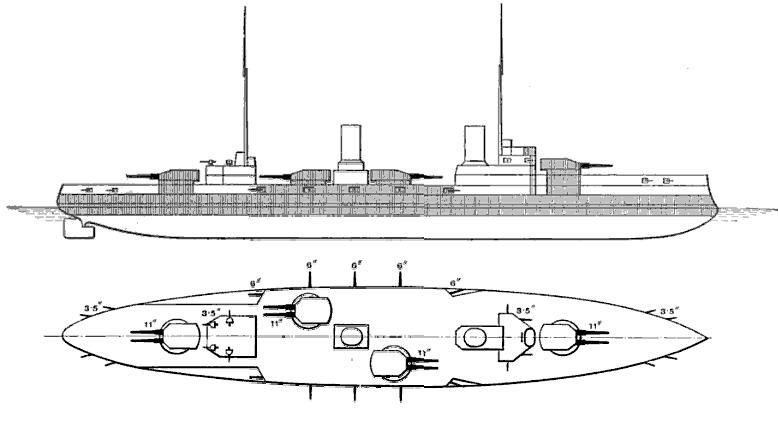
Von der Tann as depicted in Brassey's Naval Annual in 1913; shaded areas represent armor protection.

Von der Tann's armor consisted of Krupp cemented and nickel steel. Her side armor was divided into three components: a strake that extended for the full length of the hull, which comprised the belt armor. Above that, another strake that began at frame 16 (just aft of the rear main battery turret) and extended to frame 105 (just forward of the fore turret) was referred to as the citadel. Lastly, a third strake above the citadel covered the secondary battery casemates, extending for the same length as the citadel. The main belt was 250 mm (9.8 in) thick for the length of the citadel. Further aft, it reduced to 100 mm (3.9 in) and tapered down to 80 mm (3.1 in) at the top edge. The bow section of the belt tapered from 120 mm (4.7 in) down to 100 mm at the stem, and it too decreased to 80 mm at the upper edge. The citadel strake was 200 mm (7.9 in) thick, with the exception of where it covered the wing barbettes, where it increased to 225 mm (8.9 in). Armor protection for the casemates was reduced to 150 mm (5.9 in). All of the side armor was mounted on a layer of 50 mm (2 in) of teak. Transverse bulkheads capped the citadel and casemate strakes to prevent shells fired end-on from penetrating into the ship's vitals; the forward bulkhead was 200 mm thick, tapering slightly to 170 mm (6.7 in) at the edges, while the aft bulkhead was 170 mm.

A curved armor deck covered the entire ship; the central, flat portion was 0.875 m (2 ft 10.4 in) above the waterline, while the sloped sides extended down to 1.6 m (5 ft 3 in) below, where it connected to the bottom of the belt armor. Inside the citadel, the flat deck was 25 mm (0.98 in) thick, while the sloped sides increased to 50 mm in thickness. Forward of the citadel, the flat and sides of the deck were a uniform 50 mm, while the stern section of the deck was increased to 80 mm on the flat and 50 mm on the sides. Atop the casemate, another 25 mm upper deck provided additional protection. Like the armored cruiser Blücher before her, she was protected by a torpedo bulkhead, 25 mm thick. It was set back a distance of 4 meters (13 ft) from the outer hull skin, the space in between being used to store coal.

The forward conning tower was protected by 250 mm on the sides, while the aft conning tower by 200 mm. The four turrets had 230 mm (9.1 in) faces, 180 mm (7.1 in) sides and backs, and 90 mm (3.5 in) on the sloped roofs (decreasing to 60 mm (2.4 in) on the roof flats. They sat on armored barbettes that were 200 mm thick on their exposed sides, with the exception of the forward mount, which received 230 mm on the front; their inboard sides, where they were less likely to be hit, were reduced to 170 mm thickness. Below the deck, where they were protected by the citadel and belt armor, they were reduced to 30 mm (1.2 in) on the centerline turrets and 40 mm (1.6 in) on the wing mounts. Von der Tann's 15 cm guns were fitted with 80 mm thick gun shields, while most of the 8.8 cm guns received 50 mm thick shields (the stern and bow guns were not so-equipped).

Because the Von der Tann was designed to fight in the battle line, her armor was much thicker than that of the British battlecruisers. Von der Tann weighed over 2,000 tons more than the Indefatigable class, and used 10% more of her weight for armor than the battlecruisers she faced at the Battle of Jutland. Additionally, Von der Tann was unique amongst contemporary battlecruisers in the incorporation of the torpedo bulkhead, a feature that was repeated in follow-on designs.

== Service history ==
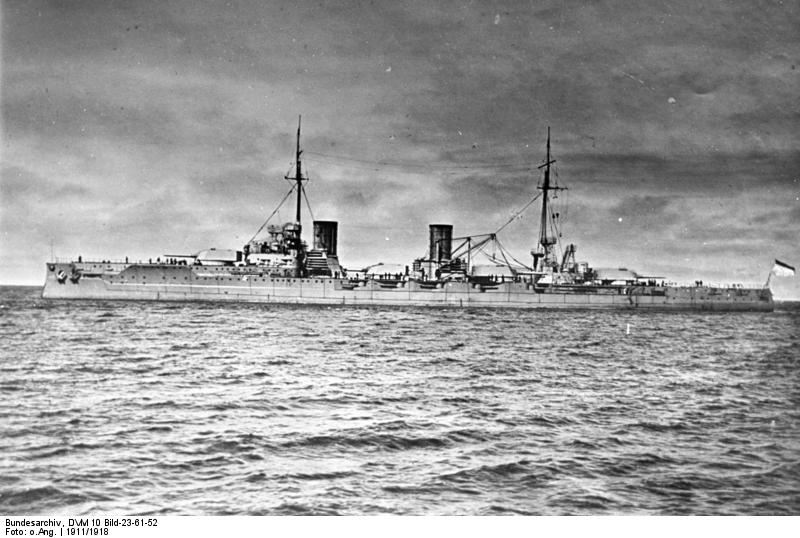
Von der Tann in 1911

The keel for Von der Tann was laid down on 21 March 1908, and the ship was launched nearly a year later on 20 March 1909. General Luitpold von der Tann-Rathsamhausen, a nephew of the ship's namesake and then the commander of III Royal Bavarian Corps, christened the ship at the launching ceremony. In May 1910, Von der Tann sailed from the Blohm & Voss shipyard in Hamburg to receive her final fitting-out in the Kaiserliche Werft (Imperial Dockyard) at Kiel. The German Navy was chronically short of crews at the time, so dockyard workers had to bring the ship to Kiel. On 1 September 1910, the ship was commissioned into the German Navy, with a crew composed largely of men from the dreadnought Rheinland. Her first commander was Kapitän zur See (KzS–Captain at Sea) Robert Mischke. During sea trials, she reached an average speed of 27 kn (50 km/h) over a six-hour period, with a top speed of 28.124 knots (52.086 km/h; 32.365 mph) with the engines at maximum output.

Von der Tann was sent to South America after completing her trials, departing Germany on 20 February 1911. She stopped in the Canary Islands on the way. She visited Rio de Janeiro, Brazil, arriving there on 14 March, where she was visited by the Brazilian president, Hermes da Fonseca, before continuing on to Itajaha on 23 March. During this period, she cruised with the German light cruiser Bremen, which was in the area. From there, she continued to Bahía Blanca, Argentina on 27 March, where many of her crew went ashore to visit the city. She stayed there until 8 April when she left for Bahia, Brazil, which she reached six days later. From there, Mischke and his staff made a visit to Buenos Aires on 30 March. On 17 April, she departed for home, arriving back in Wilhelmshaven on 6 May. The purposes of the cruise were twofold: to test the ship on an extended voyage in the tropics, and to obtain armament contracts from South American countries by impressing them with what was "widely advertised as the fastest and most powerful warship then afloat."

Two days after arriving in port, Von der Tann joined I Scouting Group. In June, she steamed to Vlissingen in the Netherlands, where she embarked Crown Prince Wilhelm and his wife Cecilie to take them to attend the coronation of King George V of the United Kingdom. The ceremonies included a Fleet Review at Spithead that lasted from 20 to 29 June, where Von der Tann represented Germany. The battlecruiser then carried the Crown Prince and Princess back to Germany. She returned to operations with the fleet in August, and on 29 September, she became the flagship of I Scouting Group, replacing Blücher in that role. The unit was at that time commanded by Vizeadmiral (Vice Admiral) Gustav Bachmann. In July 1912, while Von der Tann was undergoing an engine overhaul, the new battlecruiser Moltke replaced Von der Tann as flagship. KzS Max Hahn replaced Mischke as the ship's captain in September. She briefly served as the flagship of the deputy commander, Konteradmiral (Rear Admiral) Franz von Hipper, from 21 to 26 September. On 1 October, Von der Tann became the flagship of the 3rd Admiral of Reconnaissance Forces, KAdm Felix Funke; on 1 March 1914, Funke was transferred to command III Battle Squadron and he was replaced by KzS Arthur Tapken, who was soon promoted to Konteradmiral on the 22nd.

=== First World War ===
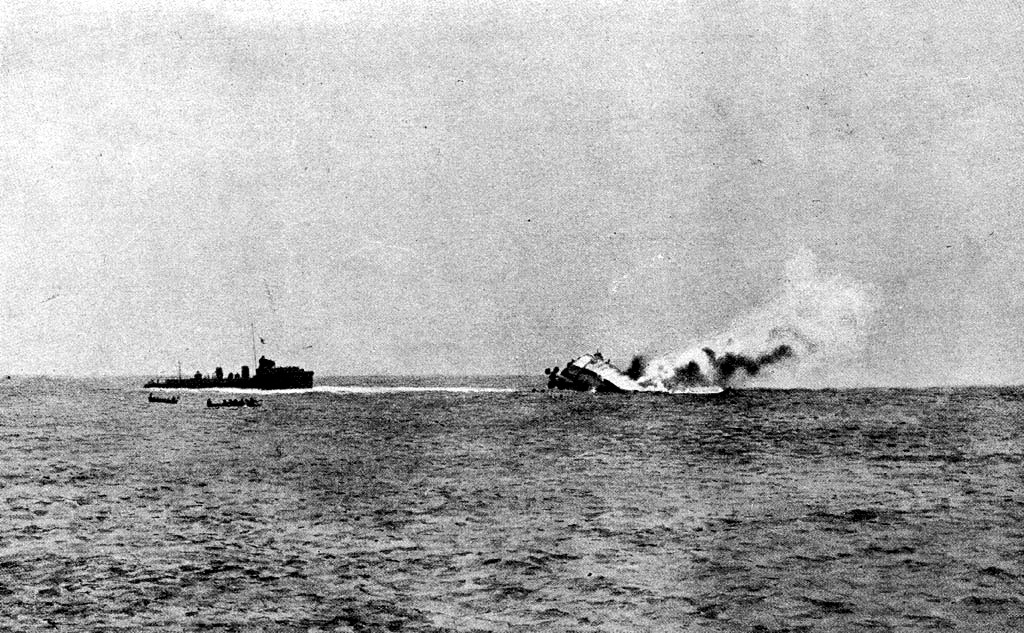
SMS Mainz sinking, with the British destroyer HMS Lurcher alongside, picking up survivors

==== 1914 ====
Following the outbreak of the First World War in July 1914, Von der Tann's first major sortie occurred when the ship took part in the unsuccessful search for British battlecruisers, after the Battle of Heligoland Bight, in August 1914. During the action, Von der Tann had been stationed in Wilhelmshaven Roads, and had been ordered to raise steam as early as 08:20, to assist the German cruisers under attack in the Heligoland Bight. At 08:50, Rear Admiral Hipper requested permission from Admiral Friedrich von Ingenohl, the commander in chief of the High Seas Fleet, to send Von der Tann and Moltke to relieve the beleaguered German cruisers.

Von der Tann was ready to sail by 10:15, more than an hour before the British battlecruisers arrived on the scene. However, the ship was held up by low tide, which prevented the battlecruisers from crossing the bar at the mouth of the Jade Estuary. At 14:10, Von der Tann and Moltke were able to cross the Jade bar, and Hipper ordered the German light cruisers to fall back on the two heavy ships, while Hipper himself was about an hour behind in the battlecruiser Seydlitz. At 14:25, the remaining light cruisers, Strassburg, Stettin, Frauenlob, Stralsund, and Ariadne, rendezvoused with the battlecruisers. Seydlitz arrived on the scene by 15:10; Ariadne succumbed to battle damage and sank. Hipper ventured forth cautiously to search for the two missing light cruisers, Mainz and Cöln. By 16:00, the German flotilla began returning to the Jade Estuary, arriving at approximately 20:23.

Later that year Von der Tann was present at the Raid on Yarmouth, on 2–3 November. At 16:30 on the 2nd, Von der Tann, along with Seydlitz (Hipper's flagship), Moltke, the armored cruiser Blücher, and the four light cruisers Strassburg, Graudenz, Kolberg, and Stralsund, departed the Jade Estuary, bound for the English coast with the intent to lay minefields in British sea lanes. At 18:00, two dreadnought battle squadrons of the High Seas Fleet departed to provide support. Hipper's force veered north in an arc to avoid Heligoland and the British submarines stationed there, and then increased speed to 18 knots. At approximately 06:30 the following morning, Hipper's battlecruisers spotted the British minesweeper Halcyon and opened fire, which drew the attention of the destroyer Lively. Hipper realized that he was wasting time, and that further pursuit would run his ships into a known minefield, so he ordered his ships back to sea. As the flotilla was turning away, the battlecruisers fired several salvos at Great Yarmouth, to little effect. By the time the British Admiralty was fully aware of the situation, the German force had retreated back to home waters.

The High Seas Fleet's disposition on the morning of 16 December

Von der Tann also participated in the raid on Scarborough, Hartlepool and Whitby, on 15–16 December. The raid was another attempt to lure out a portion of the Grand Fleet and destroy it, with the whole of the High Seas Fleet standing by in support. Von der Tann delayed the raid itself by several days, because Admiral Ingenohl was unwilling to send forth I Scouting Group at anything less than full strength, and Von der Tann was undergoing routine repairs in early December. I Scouting Group, along with II Scouting Group, composed of the four light cruisers Kolberg, Strassburg, Stralsund, and Graudenz, and two torpedo boat flotillas, left the Jade at 03:20. Hipper's ships sailed north, through the channels in the minefields, past Heligoland to the Horns Reef light vessel, at which point the ships turned westward, towards the English coast. The main battle squadrons of the High Seas Fleet left in the late afternoon of the 15th. During the night of 15 December, the main body of the High Seas Fleet encountered British destroyers, and fearing the prospect of a night-time torpedo attack, Admiral Ingenohl ordered the ships to retreat.

Upon nearing the British coast, Hipper's battlecruisers split into two groups. Seydlitz, Moltke, and Blücher went north to shell Hartlepool, while Von der Tann and Derfflinger went south to shell Scarborough and Whitby. The two ships destroyed the coast guard stations in both towns, along with the signalling station in Whitby. By 09:45 on the 16th, the two groups had reassembled, and began to retreat eastward. Hipper was unaware of Ingenohl's withdrawal, and following the bombardment of the target cities, turned back to rendezvous with the German fleet. By this time, David Beatty's battlecruisers were in position to block Hipper's chosen egress route, while other forces were en route to complete the encirclement. At 12:25, the light cruisers of II Scouting Group began to pass the British forces searching for Hipper. One of the cruisers in the 2nd Light Cruiser Squadron spotted Stralsund, and signaled a report to Beatty. At 12:30, Beatty turned his battlecruisers towards the German ships. Beatty presumed that the German cruisers were the advance screen for Hipper's ships, however, those were some 50 km (31 mi) ahead. The 2nd Light Cruiser Squadron, which had been screening for Beatty's ships, detached to pursue the German cruisers, but a misinterpreted signal from the British battlecruisers sent them back to their screening positions. (Note: Beatty had intended on retaining only the two rearmost light cruisers from Goodenough's squadron; however, Nottingham's signalman misinterpreted the signal, thinking that it was intended for the whole squadron, and thus transmitted it to Goodenough, who ordered his ships back into their screening positions ahead of Beatty's battlecruisers.) This confusion allowed the German light cruisers to escape, and alerted Hipper to the location of the British battlecruisers. The German battlecruisers wheeled to the northeast of the British forces and made good their escape.

==== 1915–1916 ====
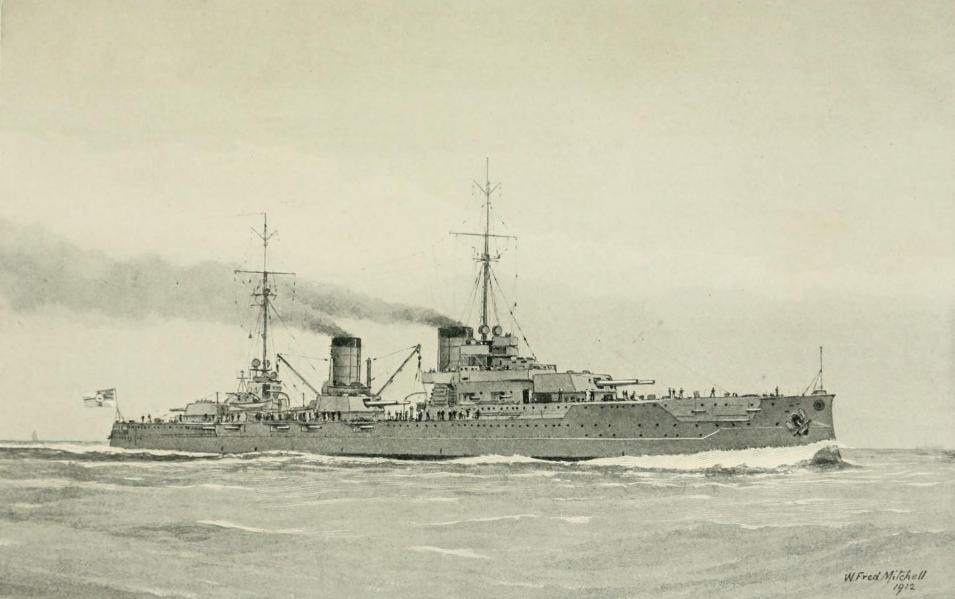
Illustration of Von der Tann under way

Von der Tann was being refitted at the time of the Battle of Dogger Bank, and so she missed this action. She was replaced by the armored cruiser Blücher, which was sunk during the battle. A detachment of men from Von der Tann had been sent to Blücher and went down with the ship. In 1915 the ship took part in operations in the North and Baltic Seas. On 10 August 1915, Von der Tann shelled the island fortress at Utö, in the eastern Baltic, during which she took part in an artillery duel with the Russian armored cruiser Admiral Makarov. Von der Tann also engaged the Russian armored cruiser Bayan and five destroyers, during which Von der Tann was struck by a shell through the funnel, which caused no casualties. On 3–4 February 1916, Von der Tann participated in the fleet advance to welcome home the commerce raider Möwe. That month, KzS Hans Zenker replaced Hahn as Von der Tann's commander. The ship was also present during the fleet sorties of 5–7 March, 17 April, 21–22 April, and 5 May.

Von der Tann also took part in the bombardment of Yarmouth and Lowestoft on 24–25 April. Hipper was away on sick leave, so the German ships were under the command of Konteradmiral Friedrich Boedicker. The German battlecruisers Derfflinger, Lützow, Moltke, Seydlitz and Von der Tann left the Jade Estuary at 10:55 on 24 April, and were supported by a screening force of 6 light cruisers and two torpedo boat flotillas. The heavy units of the High Seas Fleet sailed at 13:40, with the objective to provide distant support for Boedicker's ships. The British Admiralty was made aware of the German sortie through the interception of German Wireless signals, and deployed the Grand Fleet at 15:50.

By 14:00, Boedicker's ships had reached a position off Norderney, at which point he turned his ships northward to avoid the Dutch observers on the island of Terschelling. At 15:38, Seydlitz struck a mine, which tore a 50-ft (15-m) hole in her hull, just abaft of the starboard broadside torpedo tube, which allowed 1,400-t (1,500-short tons) of water to enter the ship. Seydlitz turned back, with the screen of light cruisers, at a speed of 15 knots. The four remaining battlecruisers turned south immediately in the direction of Norderney to avoid further mine damage. By 16:00, Seydlitz was clear of imminent danger, so the ship stopped to allow Boedicker to disembark. The torpedo boat V28 brought Boedicker to Lützow.

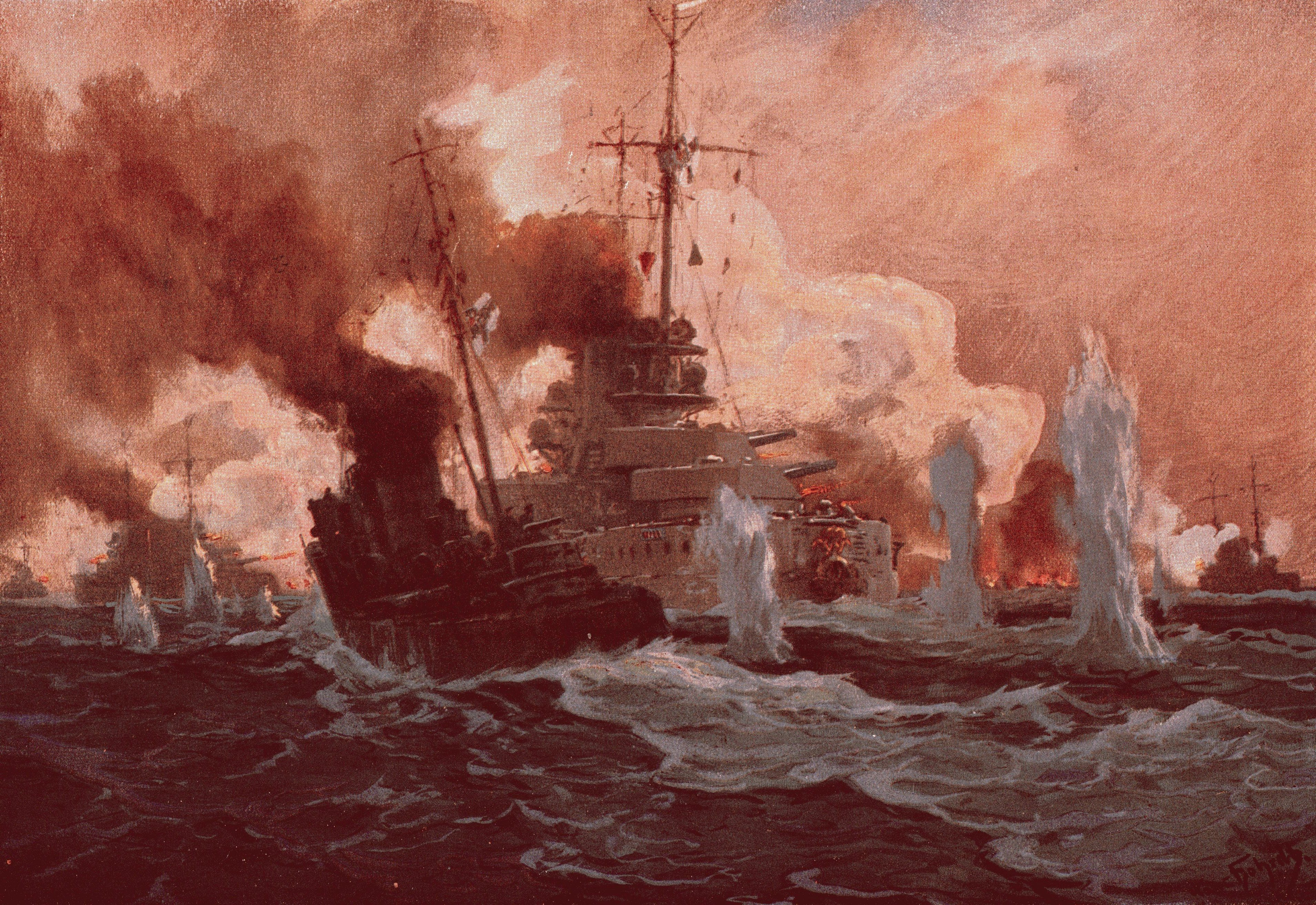
The German battlecruisers bombarding Lowestoft

At 04:50 on 25 April, the German battlecruisers were approaching Lowestoft when the light cruisers Rostock and Elbing, which had been covering the southern flank, spotted the light cruisers and destroyers of Admiral Tyrwhitt's Harwich Force. Boedicker refused to be distracted by the British ships, and instead trained his ships' guns on Lowestoft. The two 6 in (15 cm) shore batteries were destroyed, along with other damage to the town. Zenker later wrote:

Mist over the sea and the smoke from the ships ahead made it difficult for us to make out our targets as we steered for Lowestoft. But after we turned [to the north], the Empire Hotel offered us an ample landmark for effective bombardment. At 05:11 we opened fire with our heavy and medium calibers on the harbor works and swing bridges. After a few "shorts" the shooting was good. From the after-bridge a fire in the town, and from another vantage point a great explosion at the entry [to the harbor] were reported.

At 05:20, the German raiders turned north, towards Yarmouth, which they reached by 05:42. The visibility was so poor that the German ships fired one salvo each, with the exception of Derfflinger, which fired fourteen rounds from her main battery. The German ships turned back south, and at 05:47, encountered for the second time the Harwich Force, which had by then been engaged by the six light cruisers of the screening force. Boedicker's ships opened fire from a range of 13,000 yd (12,000 m). Tyrwhitt immediately turned his ships around and fled south, but not before the cruiser Conquest sustained severe damage. Due to reports of British submarines and torpedo attacks, Boedicker broke off the chase, and turned back east towards the High Seas Fleet. At this point, Scheer, who had been warned of the Grand Fleet's sortie from Scapa Flow, turned back towards Germany.

==== Battle of Jutland ====
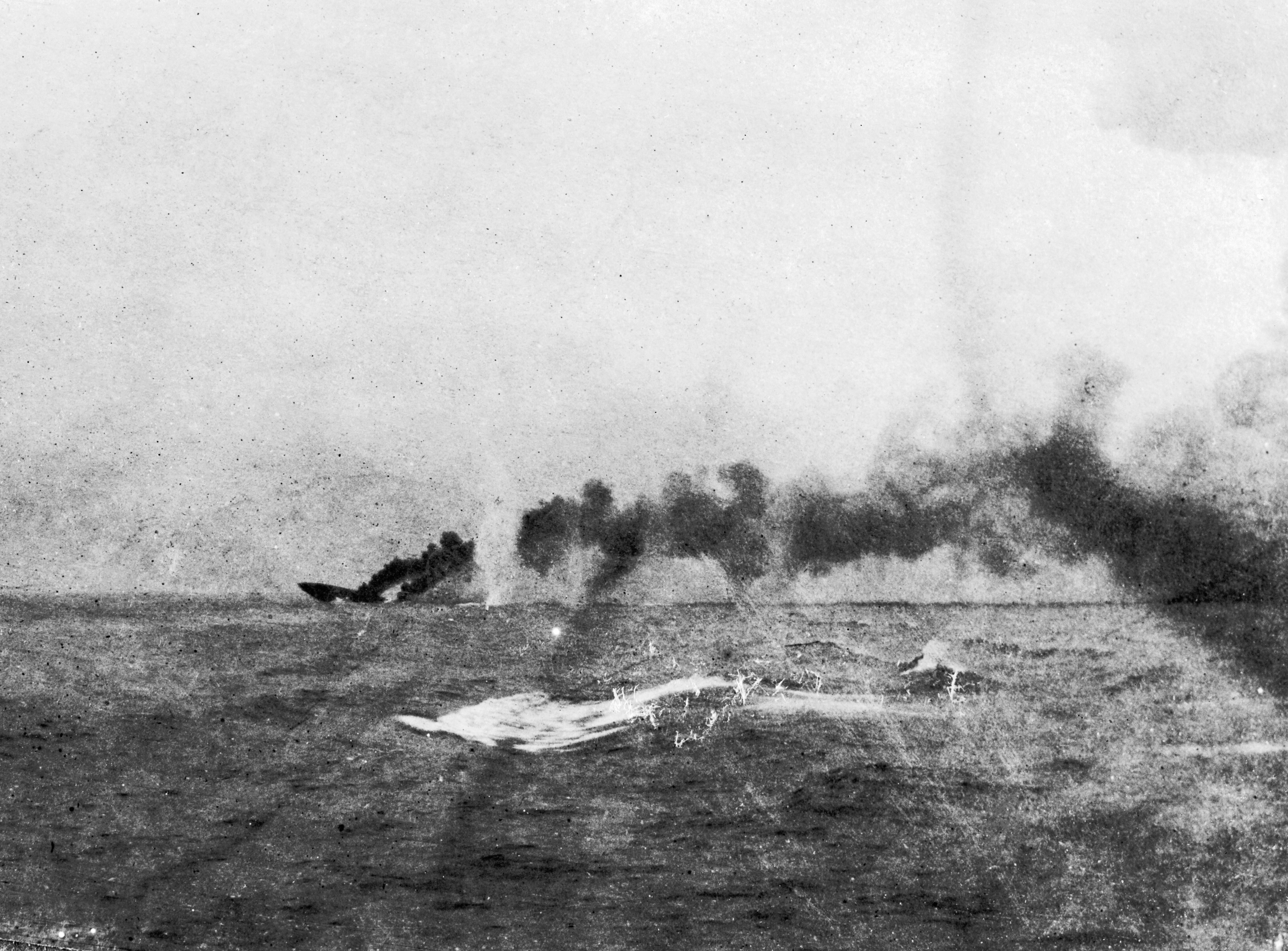
HMS Indefatigable sinking after having been struck by shells from Von der Tann

Von der Tann participated in the Battle of Jutland, as part of Hipper's First Scouting Group. Von der Tann was the rearmost of five battlecruisers in Hipper's line. Shortly before 16:00 CET, (Note: The times mentioned in this section are in CET, which is congruent with the German perspective. This is one hour ahead of UTC, the time zone commonly used in British works.) on 31 May 1916, Hipper's force encountered Beatty's battlecruiser squadron. The German ships were the first to open fire, at a range of approximately 15,000 yd (14,000 m). At 16:49, Von der Tann fired her first shot at Indefatigable. Fourteen minutes of firing later, Von der Tann had scored five hits on Indefatigable out of 52 heavy shells fired, one of which caused Indefatigable to explode and sink. An observer on the battlecruiser New Zealand, which was directly ahead of Indefatigable, later remarked that he saw "the Indefatigable hit by two shells from the Von der Tann, one on the fore turret. Both appeared to explode on impact. After an interval of thirty seconds, the ship blew up. Sheets of flame were followed by dense smoke which obscured her from view."

Following the destruction of Indefatigable, Beatty turned his force away, while the British 5th Battle Squadron closed in on the German battlecruisers, opening fire from approximately 19,000 yd (17,000 m). Von der Tann and Moltke, the two rearmost of Hipper's squadron, came under fire from the three lead British battleships of the 5th BS: Barham, Valiant, and Malaya. The German battlecruisers began zig-zagging to avoid the gunfire from the British ships. At 17:09, six minutes after sinking Indefatigable, Von der Tann was hit by one 15 in (38 cm) shell from Barham, which struck beneath the waterline and dislodged a section of the belt armor, causing Von der Tann to take in 600 tons of water. This hit temporarily damaged the ship's steering gear, and combined with Von der Tann's zig-zagging cause her to fall out of line to port. The German Official History commented that "the greatest calamity of a complete breakdown of the steering gear was averted, otherwise, Von der Tann would have been delivered into the hands of the oncoming battleships as in the case of Blücher during the Dogger Bank action."

Maps showing the maneuvers of the British (blue) and German (red) fleets on 31 May – 1 June 1916

At 17:20, a 13.5 in (34 cm) shell from the battlecruiser Tiger struck the barbette of Von der Tann's A turret. A chunk of armor plate was dislodged from inside the turret, and struck the turret training gear, which jammed the turret at 120 degrees. This put the turret out of action for the duration of the engagement. At 17:23, the ship was hit again by a 13.5 in (34 cm) shell from Tiger, which struck near the C turret and killed 6 men. The shell holed the deck and created enough wreckage that the turret was unable to traverse, and the starboard rudder engine room was damaged. The C turret was out of action until the wreckage could be cut away. Smoke from a fire caused by burning practice targets that had been stowed below the turret obscured the ship. Sections of the torpedo nets were knocked loose and trailed behind the ship. However, they were cut loose before they could catch in the propellers. New Zealand, which had been engaging Von der Tann following Indefatigable's destruction, lost sight of her target and shifted fire to Moltke. At 17:18, the range to Von der Tann from Barham had closed to 17,500 yd (16,000 m), at which point Von der Tann opened fire on the British battleship. Shortly thereafter, at 17:23, Von der Tann registered a hit on Barham. However, after firing only 24 shells, Von der Tann had to return to her earlier target, New Zealand, because her fore and aft turrets had since been disabled, and her amidships turrets were no longer able to target Barham.

At 18:15, the guns of the last active turret jammed in their mountings, leaving Von der Tann without any working main armament. Regardless, she remained in the battle line to distract the British gunners. Because she was no longer firing her main guns, Von der Tann was able to maneuver in an erratic manner, such that she could avoid British gunfire. By 18:53, the ship's speed fell from 26 to 23 kn (48 to 43 km/h). Over an hour and a half after having failed due to mechanical difficulties, D turret was repaired and again ready for action. Von der Tann sustained her fourth and final heavy shell hit at 20:19, when one 15-inch shell from Revenge struck the aft conning tower. Shell splinters penetrated the conning tower, killing the Third Gunnery Officer and both rangefinder operators and wounding every other crewman in the tower. Shell fragments and other debris fell through the ventilating shaft and onto the condenser, which put out all the lights in the ship. Eleven minutes later, at 20:30, B turret was again clear for action, and by 21:00, C turret was also in working order. However, both of the amidships turrets suffered further mechanical difficulties that put them out of action later during the battle.

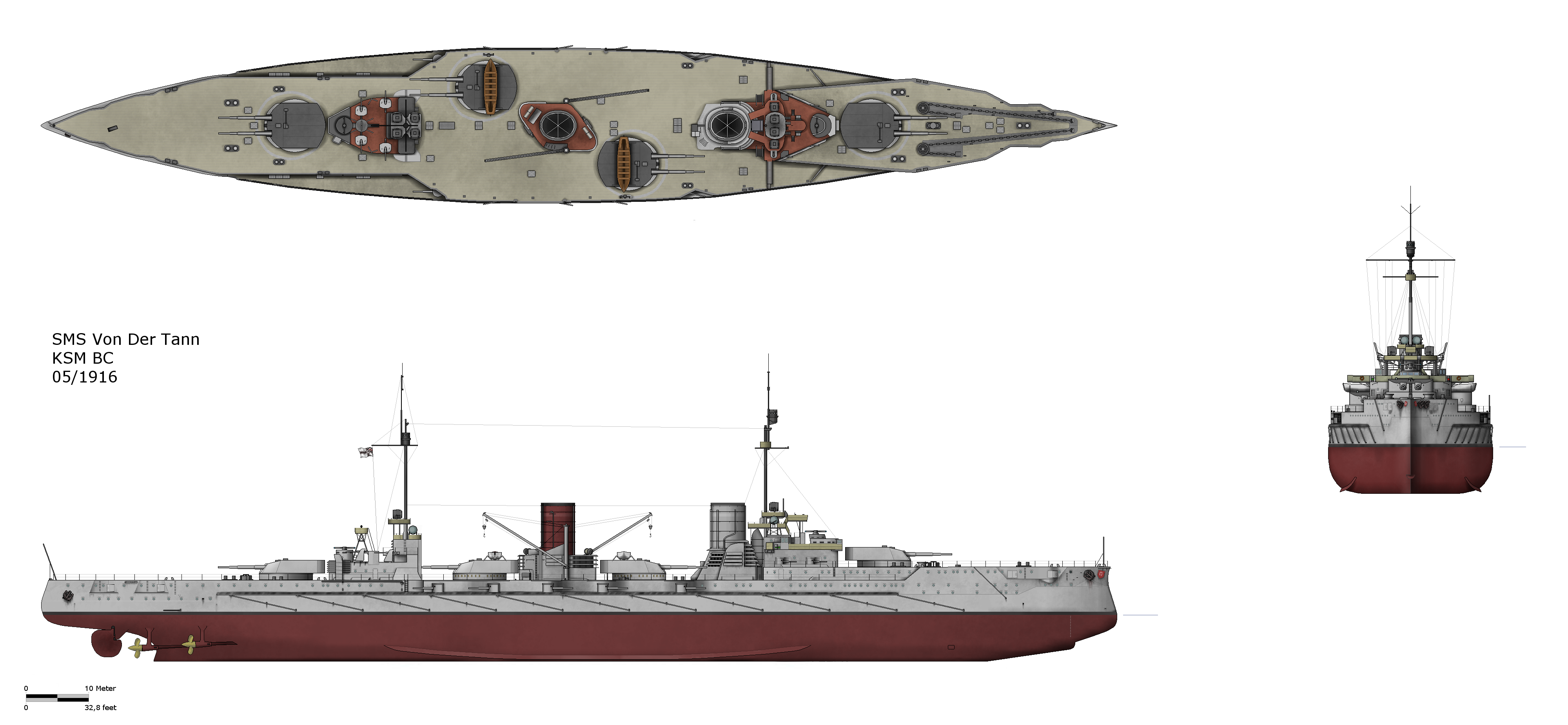
Von der Tann in her configuration at Jutland

At approximately 22:15, Hipper, with his flag now in Moltke, ordered his battlecruisers to increase speed to 20 knots, and to fall into the rear of the main German line. Neither Derfflinger, due to battle damage, nor Von der Tann, due to the dirtiness of her boiler fires, could steam at more than 18 knots. Derfflinger and Von der Tann took up positions astern of II Squadron, and were later joined by the old pre-dreadnoughts Schlesien and Schleswig-Holstein at 00:05. At 03:37, the British destroyer Moresby fired a torpedo at the rear of the German line; this passed closely across Von der Tann's bow, and forced the ship to turn sharply to starboard to avoid being hit. Close to the end of the battle, at 03:55, Hipper transmitted a report to Admiral Scheer, informing him of the tremendous damage his ships had suffered. By that time, Derfflinger and Von der Tann each had only two guns in operation, Moltke was flooded with 1,000 tons of water, and Seydlitz was severely damaged. Hipper reported: "I Scouting Group was therefore no longer of any value for a serious engagement, and was consequently directed to return to harbor by the Commander-in-Chief, while he himself determined to await developments off Horns Reef with the battlefleet."

During the course of the battle, two of Von der Tann's main turrets were knocked out by British gunfire, while her other two turrets suffered mechanical failures. The ship was firing so fast that several of the main guns in the amidships turrets became overheated and jammed in their recoil slides, and could not be returned to working order. Von der Tann was without her main battery for 11 hours, although three turrets were restored to working order before the end of the battle; D turret only after much cutting away of bent metal with oxyacetylene torches—afterwards the guns could be worked only by hand. Her casualties amounted to 11 dead and 35 wounded. During the battle Von der Tann fired 170 heavy shells and 98 secondary caliber shells.

==== Later actions ====
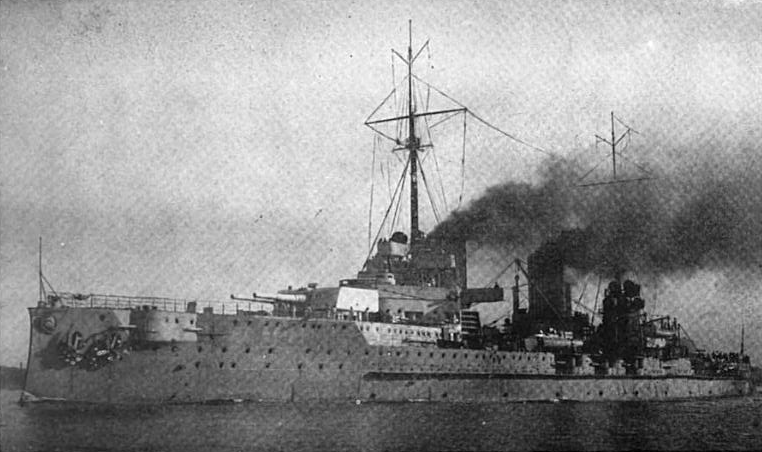
Von der Tann in 1911

After Jutland, she underwent repairs from 2 June until 29 July. After returning to the fleet, Von der Tann took part in several unsuccessful raids into the North Sea in 1916. During the first of these, conducted on 18–19 August, Von der Tann was one of two remaining German battlecruisers still in fighting condition (along with Moltke), so three dreadnoughts were assigned to I Scouting Group for the operation: Markgraf, Grosser Kurfürst, and Bayern. I Scouting Group was to bombard the coastal town of Sunderland, in an attempt to draw out and destroy Beatty's battlecruisers. Admiral Scheer and the rest of the High Seas Fleet, with fifteen dreadnoughts of its own, would trail behind, providing cover. The British were aware of the German plans, and sortied the Grand Fleet to meet them. By 14:35, Scheer had been warned of the Grand Fleet's approach and, unwilling to engage the whole of the Grand Fleet just eleven weeks after the decidedly close call at Jutland, turned his forces around and retreated to German ports.

Further sorties were conducted on 25–26 September, 18–19 October, 23–24 October, as well as the advance on 23–24 March 1917; none of these resulted in action with British forces. KzS Konrad Mommsen relieved Zenker in April. Von der Tann served as the flagship of Rear Admiral Ludwig von Reuter during the fleet advance to Norway on 23–25 April 1918, as well as in the sortie on 8–9 July.

=== Fate ===
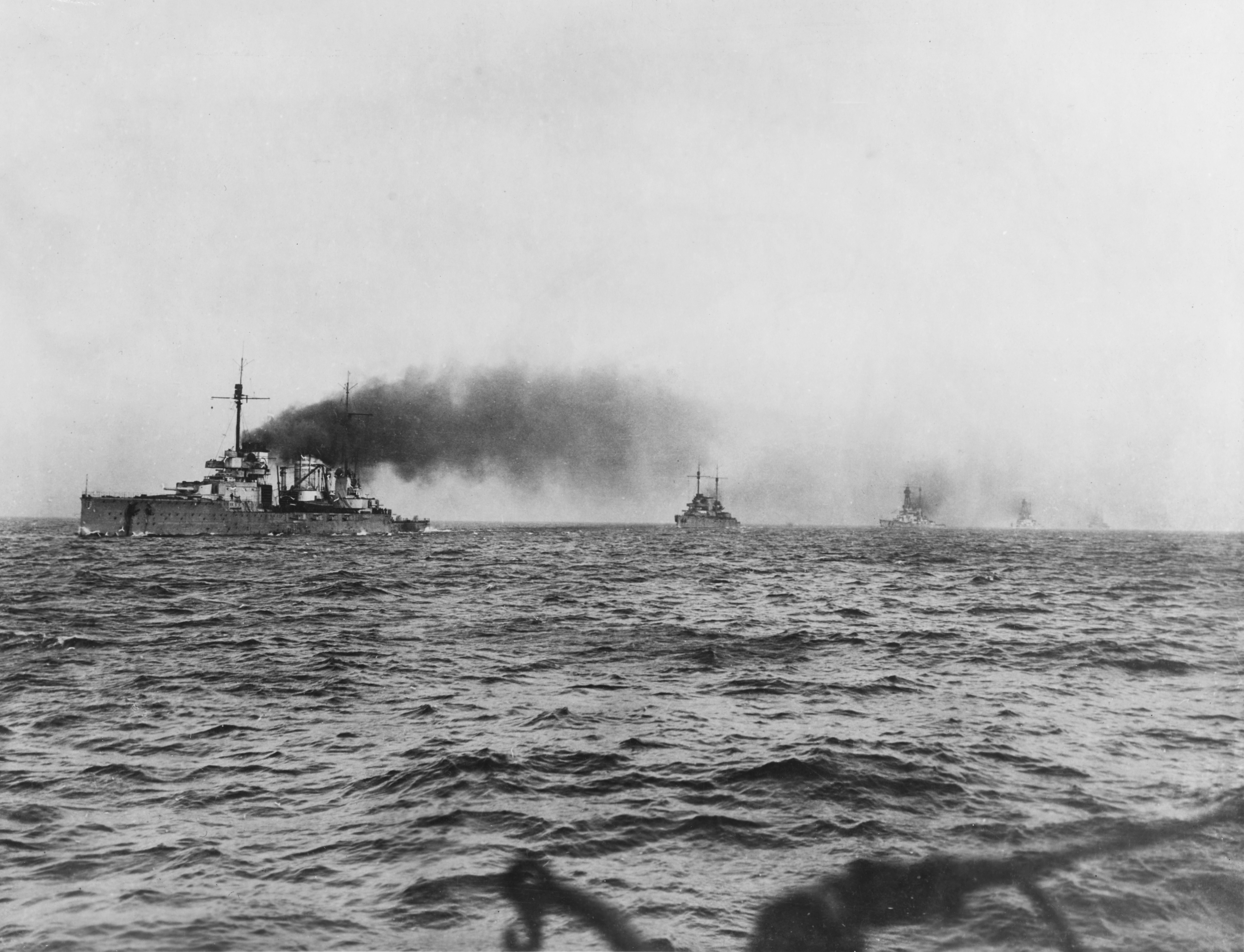
The German battlecruisers sailing into Scapa Flow. Von der Tann is the fifth ship in the line, behind Seydlitz, Moltke, Hindenburg, and Derfflinger

Von der Tann was to have taken part in a final fleet action at the end of October 1918, days before the Armistice was to take effect. The bulk of the High Seas Fleet was to have sortied from their base in Wilhelmshaven to engage the British Grand Fleet; Scheer—by now the Grand Admiral (Grossadmiral) of the fleet—intended to inflict as much damage as possible on the British navy, in order to retain a better bargaining position for Germany, despite the expected casualties. However, many of the war-weary sailors felt the operation would disrupt the peace process and prolong the war. While the High Seas Fleet was consolidating in Wilhelmshaven, sailors began deserting en masse. As Von der Tann and Derfflinger passed through the locks that separated Wilhelmshaven's inner harbor and roadstead, some 300 men from both ships climbed over the side and disappeared ashore. On the morning of 29 October 1918, the order was given to sail from Wilhelmshaven the following day. Starting on the night of 29 October, sailors on Thüringen and then on several other battleships mutinied. The unrest ultimately forced Hipper and Scheer to cancel the operation. Informed of the situation, the Kaiser stated "I no longer have a navy."

Following the capitulation of Germany in November 1918, most of the High Seas Fleet, under Reuter's command, were interned in the British naval base in Scapa Flow. Prior to the departure of the German fleet, Admiral Adolf von Trotha made clear to Reuter that he could not allow the Allies to seize the ships, under any conditions. The fleet rendezvoused with the British light cruiser Cardiff, which led the ships to the Allied fleet that was to escort the Germans to Scapa Flow. The massive flotilla consisted of some 370 British, American, and French warships. The fleet initially stopped in the Firth of Forth on 21 November, from which they were sent in smaller groups to Scapa Flow. On 24 November, Von der Tann, the other battlecruisers, and several destroyers were moved, arriving in Scapa Flow the next day. Beginning on 3 December, German merchant ships arrived to slowly reduce the crews of the ships to only those needed to maintain the vessels. Over the following week and a half, some 15,000 men were repatriated, leaving less than 5,000 sailors and officers as skeleton crews. Just 200 officers and men were left per capital ship. In addition, their guns were disabled through the removal of their breech blocks. Von der Tann was interned at Scapa Flow under the command of Kapitän-Leutnant Wollante.

While in Scapa Flow, a soldiers' council was formed aboard the ship; the council took complete, dictatorial control of the vessel for the duration of the interment. The fleet remained in captivity during the negotiations that ultimately produced the Treaty of Versailles. Reuter believed that the British intended to seize the German ships on 21 June 1919, which was the deadline for Germany to have signed the peace treaty. Unaware that the deadline had been extended to the 23rd, Reuter ordered the ships to be sunk at the next opportunity. On the morning of 21 June, the British fleet left Scapa Flow to conduct training maneuvers, and at 11:20 Reuter transmitted the order to his ships. The ship sank in two hours and fifteen minutes.

The British initially intended to leave the wrecks where they sank, but they quickly determined that they would be hazards to navigation. In 1920, the government began selling off salvage rights. The task of raising Von der Tann was secured by Cox & Danks Shipbreaking Co. During preparation work, three workers were nearly killed when their oxy-acetylene cutters set off a major explosion. The blast tore holes in the still submerged vessel and allowed water into the compartment that had been emptied with compressed air; by the time the men were rescued, the compartment had refilled almost completely and the men were up to their necks. Nevertheless, the ship was successfully brought up on 7 December 1930. A collapse of scrap metal prices in 1931 temporarily delayed the sale of Von der Tann to February 1933, when she was sold to the shipbreakers Metal Industries in Rosyth. The ship was towed there in July, arriving on the 9th. Demolition work began on 12 July and was completed by 23 May 1934.
