= Ludwig Freiherr von und zu der Tann-Rathsamhausen =

19th-century Bavarian general (1815–1881)

Freiherr Ludwig Samson Heinrich Arthur
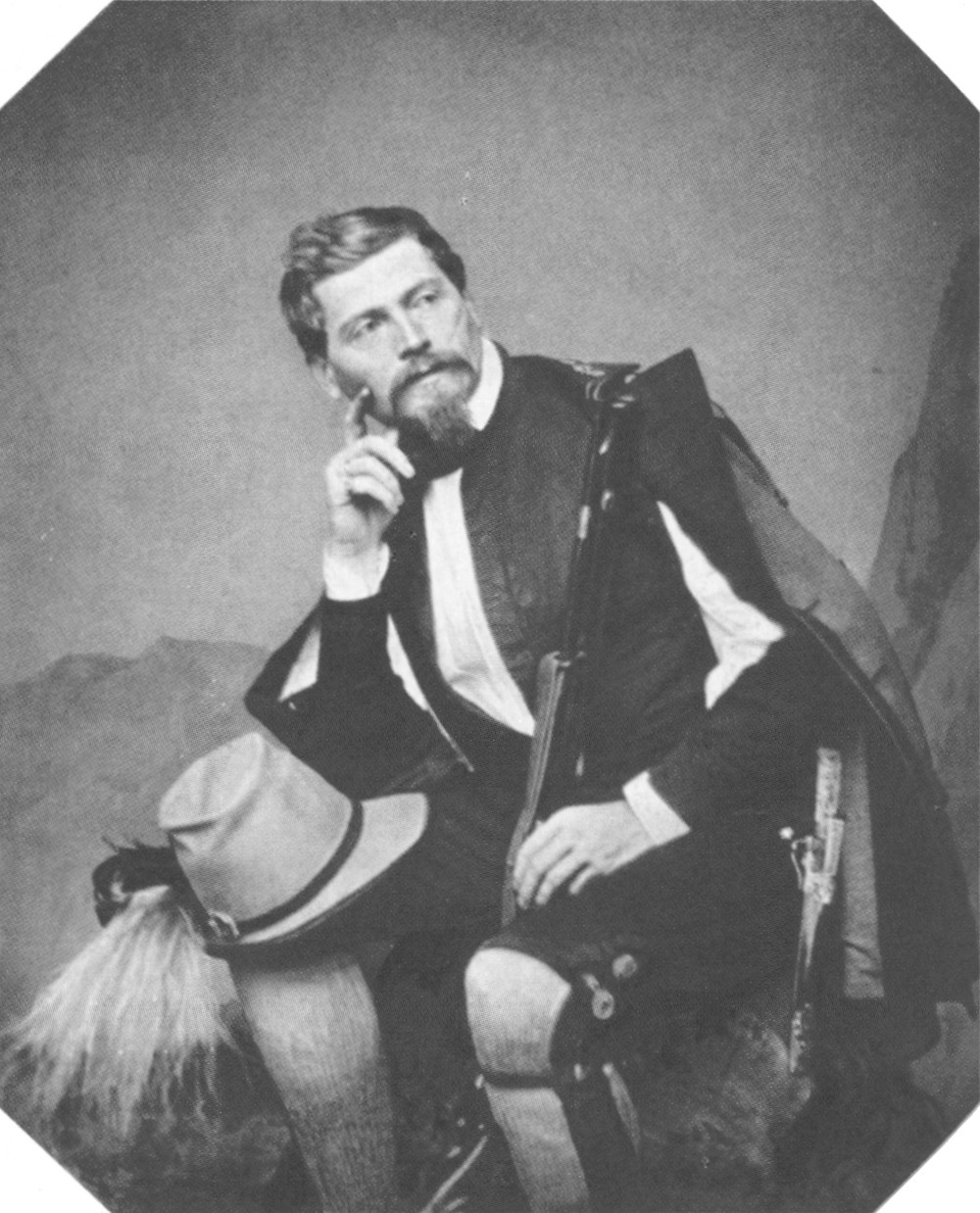
- Photograph by Franz Hanfstaengl, c. 1860
- Born: 18 June 1815; Darmstadt, Grand Duchy of Hesse
- Died: 26 April 1881 (aged 65); Meran, County of Tyrol, Austria-Hungary
- Military career
- Allegiance: Kingdom of Bavaria; German Empire
- Branch: Bavarian Army; Imperial German Army
- Rank: General of the Infantry
- Commands: I Royal Bavarian Corps
- Conflicts: First Schleswig War; Austro-Prussian War; Franco-Prussian War
- Awards: Military Order of Max Joseph; Military Merit Order (Bavaria); Pour le Mérite; Order of the Crown; Order of the Red Eagle; Iron Cross

Ludwig Samson Heinrich Arthur Freiherr von und zu der Tann-Rathsamhausen (18 June 1815 – 26 April 1881) was a Bavarian general.

== Early life ==
Born in Darmstadt, on the day of Waterloo, Ludwig was a descendant from the old family of von der Tann, which had branches in Bavaria, Alsace and the Rhine provinces; he attached his mother's name (she being the daughter of an Alsatian nobleman, Freiherr von Rathsamhausen) to his father's in 1868 by license of the king of Bavaria. Ludwig I, the second king of Bavaria, stood sponsor for the child, who received his name and also "Arthur", in honour of Arthur Wellesley, 1st Duke of Wellington. He received a careful education, and in 1827 became a page at the Bavarian court, where a great future was predicted for him.

== Military career ==
Von der Tann entered the military under the artillery branch in 1833, and was after some years placed on the general staff. He attended the manoeuvres of the Austrian army in Italy under Field Marshal Radetzky and, in a spirit of adventure, joined a French military expedition operating in Algiers against the Tunisian frontier.

=== First Schleswig War ===
On his return he became a close personal friend of the Bavarian Crown Prince Maximilian (afterwards King Maximilian II). In 1848 he was promoted to major, and in that year he distinguished himself greatly as the leader of a Schleswig-Holstein light corps in the First Schleswig War between Denmark and a coalition of German states. At the close of the first campaign he was awarded the Order of the Red Eagle by the king of Prussia, and his own sovereign awarded him the Military Order of Max Joseph and promoted him to lieutenant-colonel. In 1849 he served as chief of staff to the Bavarian contingent at the front and distinguished himself at the lines of Dybbøl. He then visited Haynau's headquarters in the Hungarian War before returning to Schleswig-Holstein to serve as von Willisen's chief of staff in the Idstedt campaign.

=== Austro-Prussian War ===
Then came the threat of war between Prussia and Austria, and von der Tann was recalled to Bavaria. The crisis ended with the surrender of Olmütz (November 1850), and he saw no further active service until 1866, rising in the usual way of promotion to colonel (1851), major-general (1855), and lieutenant-general (1861). In the earlier years of this period he was the aide-de-camp and constant companion of King Maximilian. In the Austro-Prussian War of 1866 he served as chief of staff to Prince Karl Theodor of Bavaria, who commanded the South German contingents. The almost entirely unfavorable outcome of the military operations led to vehement attacks on him in the press, but the unreadiness and ineffectiveness of the troops and the general lack of interest in the war on the part of the soldiers had foredoomed the South Germans to failure in any case.

=== Franco-Prussian War ===
He continued to enjoy the favour of the king and was promoted to the rank of general of the infantry (1869), but the bitterness of his disappointment of 1866 never left him. He was grey-haired at forty-two, and his health was impaired. In 1869 von der Tann-Rathsamhausen, as he was now called, was appointed commander of the I. Bavarian Corps. This corps he commanded during the Franco-Prussian War of 1870/71, and it was in this war that he secured his reputation as one of the foremost of German soldiers. His gallantry was conspicuous at the battles of Wörth and Sedan. Transferred in the autumn to an independent command on the Loire, he conducted the operations against d'Aurelle de Paladines, at first with marked success, and forced the surrender of Orléans. He had, however, at Coulmiers to give way before a numerically larger French force; but reinforced, he fought several successful engagements under the Grand Duke of Mecklenburg-Schwerin near Orléans.

After the end of the war he was reappointed commander-in-chief of the I. Bavarian Corps, a post which he held until his death in 1881 at Meran. He received the Grand Cross of the Bavarian Military Order, and from the King of Prussia the first class of the Iron Cross and the Pour le Mérite. In 1878 the German emperor named von der Tann honorary colonel of a Prussian infantry regiment, gave him a life pension, and named one of the new Strassburg forts after him.

== Honours and awards ==
Commemoration

- A gunboat of the Schleswig-Holstein navy, Von der Tann, named after him in 1849.
- The German World War I battlecruiser SMS Von der Tann was named after him.
- The 11th Royal Bavarian Infantry Regiment (part of the 6th Royal Bavarian Division formed in 1900 in Regensburg) was designated "Von der Tann" in his honor.
- Naming of "Fort Tann" Fort No. 8 at Strasbourg by emperor Wilhelm I (1873)
- Honorary Citizen of the City of Munich (1871)
- Monument on Marktplatz von Tann (Rhön) (1900)
- Naming of Von-der-Tann-Straße in Erlangen (1900), Munich, Dortmund, Wuppertal (1901), Hamburg, Nuremberg, Neustadt and Regensburg (1901)
- Composer Andreas Hager wrote in 1880 in his homage to "General von der Thann march", as the parade of his regiment (Royal Bav. 11th Infantry Regiment "Von der Thann") has been assigned.

Orders and decorations

- Bavaria:
  - Knight of Merit of the Bavarian Crown, 17 April 1853; Commander, 1 January 1862
  - Knight of the Military Order of Max Joseph, 26 April 1854; Commander, 1 September 1870; Grand Cross, 22 October 1870; Chancellor, 22 August 1876
  - Commander of the Merit Order of St. Michael, 25 August 1858
  - Army Memorial Cross (1866)
  - Grand Cross of the Military Merit Order
  - Cross of Honour of the Order of Ludwig, 1877
- Austria: Knight of the Iron Crown, 1st Class, 1860
- Belgium: Officer of the Order of Leopold, 9 July 1861; Grand Cordon, 9 February 1866 (military)
- Greece: Grand Commander of the Redeemer
- Hanover: Grand Cross of the Royal Guelphic Order, 1864
- Hesse-Kassel: Commander of the Wilhelmsorden, 2nd Class, 13 October 1852
- Hesse-Darmstadt:
  - Commander of the Merit Order of Philip the Magnanimous, 1st Class, 12 June 1858
  - Grand Cross of the Ludwig Order, 24 March 1877
- Lippe:
  - Cross of Honour of the House Order of Lippe, 1st Class with Swords
  - Military Merit Medal (Schaumburg-Lippe)
- Luxembourg: Grand Cross of the Oak Crown
- Modena: Commander of the Eagle of Este, 1857
- Mecklenburg:
  - Grand Cross of the Wendish Crown
  - Military Merit Cross, 1st Class (Schwerin)
- Ottoman Empire: Order of the Medjidie, 2nd Class
- Russia:
  - Knight of the White Eagle
  - Knight of St. Anna, 1st Class
  - Knight of St. Stanislaus, 1st Class
- Saxony: Grand Cross of the Albert Order, with War Decoration, 1871
- Prussia:
  - Knight of Honour of the Johanniter Order, 3 October 1844
  - Knight of the Red Eagle, 3rd Class with Swords, 19 September 1848; Grand Cross with Swords on Ring, 29 July 1876
  - Duppel Storm Cross, 18 April 1864
  - Iron Cross (1870), 2nd Class, 30 August 1870; 1st Class, October 1870
  - Pour le Mérite (military), 22 December 1870
  - Knight of the Royal Crown Order, 1st Class with Enamel Band of the Red Eagle Order and Swords, 16 June 1871
- Sweden-Norway:
  - Commander Grand Cross of the Sword, 6 September 1859
  - Grand Cross of St. Olav, 11 October 1872
- Waldeck and Pyrmont: Military Merit Cross, 1st Class
- Württemberg: Grand Cross of the Württemberg Crown, 1869

Military appointments

- Presentation à la suite of the 1st Field Artillery Regiment "Prince Leopold", 24 July 1878
- Appointment as Chief of the Royal Prussian 2 Lower Silesian Infantry Regiment No. 47, 8 August 1878
