= Grolman =

Grolman is a surname. Notable people with the surname include:

- Carl Ludwig Wilhelm Grolman (1775–1829), German statesman and Minister-President of Hesse
- Karl von Grolman (1777–1843), Prussian general and military reformer
- Wilhelm Heinrich von Grolman (1781–1856), Prussian jurist
