= German General Staff =

Full-time body at the head of the Prussian Army and German Army

Great General Staff
- Großer Generalstab (German)
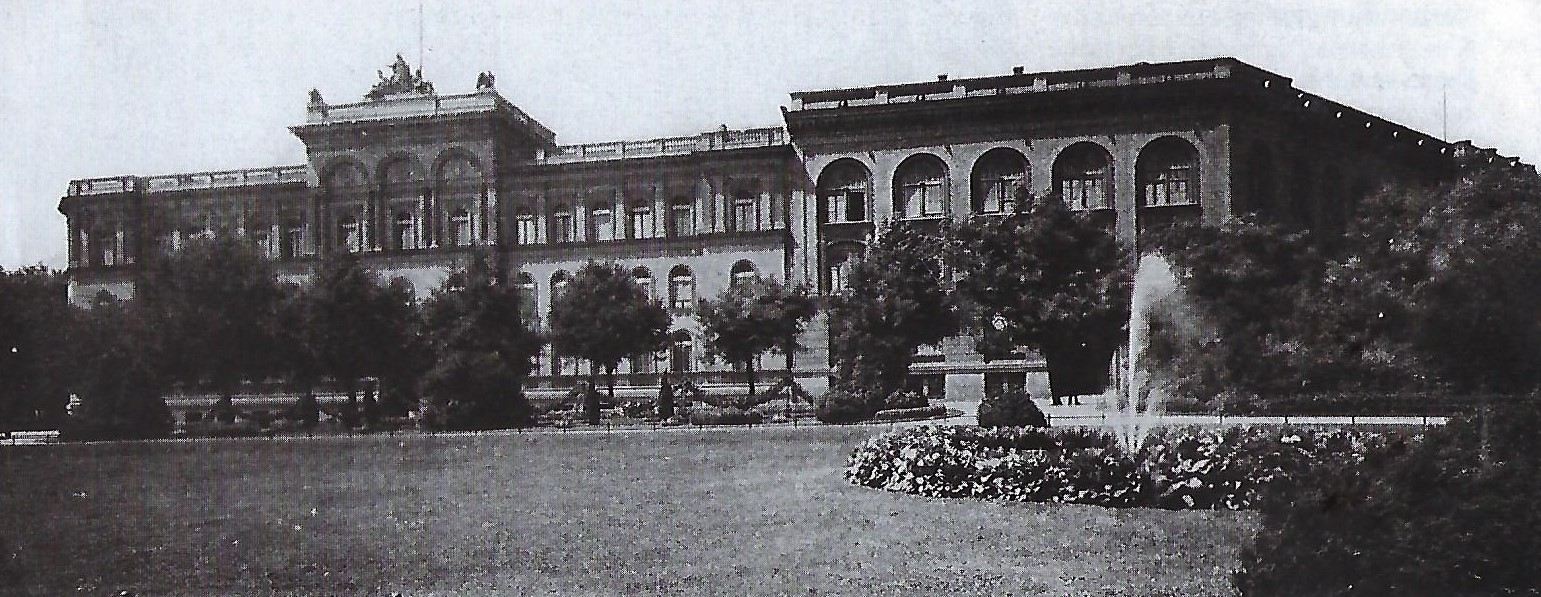
- Great General Staff building on the Königsplatz, Berlin in 1900
- Active: 1806–1945
- Country: Kingdom of Prussia; German Empire; German Reich
- Allegiance: Prussian Army; Imperial German Army; German Army
- Branch: Active duty
- Type: Staff
- Part of: Prussian Ministry of War; Oberkommando der Wehrmacht
- Garrison/HQ: Berlin

Commanders
- Notable commanders: Helmuth von Moltke the Elder; Alfred von Schlieffen; Helmuth von Moltke the Younger; Erich von Falkenhayn; Paul von Hindenburg; Franz Halder; Heinz Guderian

The German General Staff, originally the Prussian General Staff and officially the Great General Staff (German: Großer Generalstab), was a full-time body at the head of the Prussian Army and later, the German Army, responsible for the continuous study of all aspects of war, and for drawing up and reviewing plans for mobilization or campaign. It existed unofficially from 1806, and was formally established by law in 1814. The first general staff in existence, it was distinguished by the formal selection of its officers by intelligence and proven merit rather than patronage or wealth, and by the exhaustive and rigorously structured training which its staff officers undertook.

The Prussian General Staff also enjoyed greater freedom from political control than its contemporaries, and this autonomy was enshrined in law on the unification of Germany and the establishment of the German Empire in 1871. It came to be regarded as the home of German militarism in the aftermath of World War I, and the victorious Allies attempted to suppress the institution. It nevertheless survived to play its accustomed part in the German rearmament and World War II.

In a broader sense, the Prussian General Staff corps consisted of those officers qualified to perform staff duties, and formed a unique military fraternity. Their exhaustive training was designed not only to weed out the less motivated or less able candidates, but also to produce a body of professional military experts with common methods and outlook. General Staff–qualified officers alternated between line and staff duties but remained lifelong members of this special organization.

Until the end of the German Empire, social and political convention often placed members of noble or royal households in command of its armies or corps but the actual responsibility for the planning and conduct of operations lay with the formation's staff officers. For other European armies which lacked this professionally trained staff corps, the same conventions were often a recipe for disaster. Even the Army of the Second French Empire, whose senior officers had supposedly reached high rank as a result of bravery and success on the battlefield, was crushed by the Prussian and other German armies during the Franco-Prussian War in 1870–1871. That outcome highlighted poor French administration and planning, and lack of professional education.

The chief of staff of a Prussian formation in the field had the right to disagree, in writing, with the plans or orders of the commander of the formation, and appeal to the commander of the next highest formation (which might ultimately be the king, or emperor, who would be guided by the head of the Great General Staff). This served as a check on incompetence and also served for the objecting officer to officially disassociate himself from a flawed plan. Only the most stubborn commanders would not give way before this threat.

For these reasons, Prussian and German military victories were often credited professionally to the chief of staff, rather than to the nominal commander of an army. Often the commander of an army was himself a member of the General Staff, but it was now institutionally recognized that not only was command leadership important, but effective staff work was a significant key to success in both pre-war planning and in wartime operations.

== History ==
=== Early history ===
Before the nineteenth century, success on the battlefield largely depended on the military competence of the sovereign. Duke Frederick William introduced the term Generalstabsdienst (General Staff Service) for the Prusso-Brandenburgian army in 1640. While Frederick the Great brought success to the Prussian arms, his successors lacked his talent, so generalship in the Army declined, even though they were assisted by a Quartermaster General Staff of adjutants and engineers established by Frederick the Great. Reformers in the army began to write and lecture on the need to preserve and somehow institutionalize the military talent that Frederick had assembled in his army. They argued that a carefully assembled cadre of talented officer staff could plan logistics and train the Army in peace as well as in war. In the last years of the eighteenth century, it became the practice to assign military experts to assist the generals of Prussia's Army, largely at the instigation of comparatively junior but gifted officers such as Gerhard von Scharnhorst and August von Gneisenau. Nevertheless, such measures were insufficient to overcome the inefficiency of the Army, which was commanded by aged veterans of the campaigns of Frederick the Great, almost half a century earlier.

In 1806, the Prussian Army was routed by the French Imperial Army led by Napoleon and his marshals at the Battles of Jena and Auerstedt. In the aftermath of this debacle, the Prussian Army and state largely collapsed. "Seldom in history has an army been reduced to impotence more swiftly or decisively." After the Peace of Tilsit in 1807, King Frederick William III appointed Scharnhorst, Gneisenau, Minister President Baron vom und zum Stein and several promising young officers to his Military Reorganization Commission. This commission acted as a general staff to plan and implement the reconstruction of the Prussian Army. They persuaded the king that to match the French commanders, who rose by merit, each Prussian commander of an Army, Corps and Division should have a staff-trained officer assigned as his adjutant. Scharnhorst intended them to "support incompetent Generals, providing the talents that might otherwise be wanting among leaders and commanders". The unlikely pairing of the erratic but popular Field Marshal Blücher as commander in chief with Lieutenant General Gneisenau as his chief of staff showed this system to its best advantage: Blücher lauded Gneisenau for his role in maneuvering the Prussian Army during a difficult retreat through the Harz mountains.

Gneisenau is recognized as the first "great Chief of Staff". He institutionalized the right of the commander's adviser to take part in command and control by advising the commander until he makes a decision. Gneisenau also founded mission tactics (Auftragstaktik), in which the commander determines the objective of an operation and allocates the forces used, while the subordinate on the spot determines how the objective will be attained.

In 1816, the reformer Karl von Grolman organised the Staff into Eastern (Russia), Southern (Austria), and Western (France and the other German states) Divisions. Sixteen staff officers served in the Prussian Ministry of War and six staff officers worked in the main embassies. Each army corps had one chief of staff and two other staff officers. In 1821 the Quartermaster General Staff was renamed to the General Staff, and its officers were identified by distinctive uniform markings, including a crimson trouser stripe. Staff positions did not depend on lineage. "General von Krauseneck, who was the Chief of the General Staff from 1829 to 1848, was the son of a Brandenburg organ player and had been promoted from the ranks. General von Rheyer, Chief of the Prussian General Staff from 1848 to 1857 was a shepherd in his youth."

The General Staff continually planned for likely and unlikely scenarios. In 1843, when Europe had been largely at peace for nearly thirty years and most major nations had no plans for war, observers noted sheaves of orders at the Prussian War Ministry, already made out to cover all foreseeable contingencies and requiring only a signature and a date stamp to be put into effect.

=== Selection and education of staff officers ===
The Military Reorganization Commission opened military schools in Königsberg and Breslau. On 15 October 1810 Scharnhorst opened the General War School (Allgemeine Kriegsschule), on the same day that the new University of Berlin opened nearby. The General War School trained selected officers for three years. One of its first directors was Carl von Clausewitz, who served until 1830. His monumental work On War (Vom Kriege) was published posthumously. From his studies and experiences during the Napoleonic Wars, he wrote a syllabus which became the staff's central doctrine. This standardization of doctrine — which was an attempt to grasp the philosophy underlying warfare, rather than setting a narrow set of rules such as those laid down by Antoine-Henri Jomini — was one of the distinguishing features of the Prussian General Staff.

Every General Staff officer had to be able, at any time, to take over the work of another and apply to it the same body of basic ideas and the same principles of operational and tactical thought.

On October 1, 1859, the General War School was renamed the War Academy (Kriegsakademie), which was supervised by the Inspector-General of Military Education. Students at the War Academy attended about 20 hours of lectures per week. Instruction was by professors from Berlin University and officers serving on the Great General Staff, who thereby enhanced their own educations. In 1872 the War Academy was taken from the Inspector of Military Education and placed under the Chief of the General Staff. The spirit of the academy was articulated by Chief of Staff Helmuth von Moltke, who emphasized the importance "of an active process of mental give and take between teacher and pupils, so as to stimulate the pupils to become fellow-workers".

Admission to the academy was highly selective. Officers with at least five years service who wanted to become General Staff officers prepared themselves for the entrance examination, which included tactics, surveying, geography, mathematics and French, with questions set to test understanding rather than rote memory. The graders of the essays did not know the names or regiments of the candidates. From hundreds of applicants, about one hundred were accepted every year to enter the first-year course at the academy. Those who performed satisfactorily were promoted to the second and then the third year.

In the first year, fourteen hours of lectures each week were on military subjects, including military history, while seventeen hours were non-military, which included general history, mathematics, science and a choice of French or Russian. Roughly the same time allocations were used in the last two years. Lectures were supplemented by visits to fortifications, arms factories and exercises of the railway regiment. During the three month summer breaks the students attended manoeuvres and were taken on field tactical exercises in which they commanded imaginary units. At the end of the course they took their second examination. Only about thirty students passed this extremely difficult test. They were then assigned (kommandiert) to the Great General Staff, while retaining their regimental attachments. After two years they took their third and final examination, after which five to eight officers were permanently posted to fill vacancies in the General Staff — a remarkable winnowing from the many who had entered the competition. Occasionally, an exceptional officer was appointed without this training: for example Max Bauer, who was trained as an artilleryman, became a prominent member of the Great General Staff, with the reputation of being the smartest man in the army.

Some graduates were not enthusiastic about the first year of their training. For example, Paul von Hindenburg thought that the history of ancient battles should be minimized to give more time to modern, and that trigonometry was only useful to those who would be surveyors. The final two years satisfied him. While at the academy he was invited into the social circle of Prince Alexander of Prussia, where he came "in touch with men of science as well as those in the state and court service.

After its defeat in the war against Prussia of 1866, Bavaria established its own War Academy and continued to train its own staff officers after the foundation of the German Empire in 1870.

=== Size of the staff ===
The General Staff of that time was a small, elite body, numbering as few as fifty officers and rarely exceeding one hundred officers. Only one or two officers were permanently assigned to the General Staff, described in official returns as des Generalstabs ("of the General Staff") at any time; most were attached to the General Staff while remaining affiliated to their parent regiments, usually for several years at a time, and were listed as im Generalstab ("on the General Staff"). When the General Staff was required to take the field during major campaigns, it remained a small but effective body. During the Franco-Prussian War for example, the staff that accompanied the headquarters of the King (as commander-in-chief) and was responsible for the direction of armies that totaled 850,000 men, consisted of the chief of staff, a quartermaster-general and an intendant-general whose duties were not directly concerned with military operations, three heads of departments, eleven other officers, ten draughtsmen, seven clerks and fifty-nine other ranks (orderlies, messengers, etc.).

Nor was there ever a large pool of officers to draw upon to perform General Staff duties. In 1871, there were only 375 officers fully qualified to serve on the General Staff, even after an emergency expansion during the Franco-Prussian War. In 1914, there were 625 General Staff-qualified officers for armies which had almost doubled in size since 1871.

=== Moltke the Elder ===
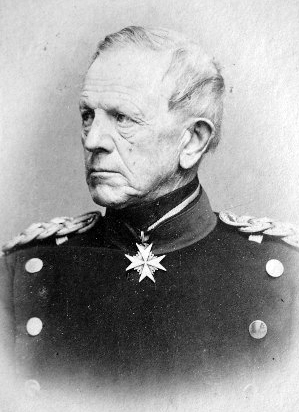
General Helmuth von Moltke the Elder, Chief of the General Staff from 1857 to 1888

In 1857, Helmuth von Moltke the Elder, a widely travelled officer who was a confidante of King William I, was appointed Chief of the General Staff. Under his control, the existing staff system was expanded and consolidated.

Each year, Moltke selected the best twelve graduates from the Kriegsakademie for his personal training as General Staff officers. They attended theoretical studies, annual manoeuvres, "war rides" (a system of tactical exercises without troops in the field) under Moltke himself, and war games and map exercises known as Kriegsspiele. Although these officers subsequently alternated between regimental and staff duties, they could be relied upon to think and act exactly as Moltke had taught them when they became the Chiefs of Staff of major formations. Moltke himself referred to them as the "nervous system" of the Prussian Army. In the victories which the Prussian Army was to gain against Austrian Empire and France, Moltke needed only to issue brief directives expressing his intentions to the main formations, leaving the staffs at the subordinate headquarters to implement the details according to the doctrines and methods he had laid down, while the Supreme Commands of his opponents became bogged down in mountains of paperwork and trivia as they tried to control the entire army from a single overworked headquarters.

Moltke's wide experience also prompted the General Staff to consider fields of study outside the purely military, and rapidly adapt them to military use. Immediately upon his appointment, he established the Abteilung (section or department) which studied and promoted the development of railway networks within Prussia and incorporated them into its deployment plans. He also formed telegraphic, and other scientific and technical departments within the General Staff and a Historical division, which analysed past and current conflicts and published accounts of them and lessons learned.

The General Staff reformed by Moltke was the most effective in Europe, an autonomous institution dedicated solely to the efficient execution of war, unlike in other countries, whose staffs were often fettered by meddling courtiers, parliaments and government officials. On the contrary, the General Staff itself had a powerful effect on Prussian, and later German, politics.

==== War with Denmark ====
The Second Schleswig War (1864), the political origins of which lay in Denmark's conflict with Prussia and Austria over the Schleswig–Holstein question, vindicated Moltke's concepts of operations and led to an overhaul of the command arrangements of the Prussian Army. Moltke envisaged a rapid attack to prevent the Danes falling back behind water obstacles which the Prussian Navy could not overcome. A rigid system of seniority placed Friedrich Graf von Wrangel, widely regarded as being in his dotage, in command. He ignored all of Moltke's directives and his own staff's advice, and by allowing the Danish Army to withdraw at its leisure he prolonged the war for several months. The resulting post mortem was to ensure a better (though not infallible) system for appointing commanders.

==== Seven Weeks' War ====
The Austro-Prussian War (1866) became almost inevitable after the end of hostilities with Denmark. Many Prussians regarded the war as a sad necessity. Moltke, describing his reasons for confidence to War Minister Albrecht von Roon, stated "We have the inestimable advantage of being able to carry our Field Army of 285,000 men over five railway lines and of virtually concentrating them in twenty-five days ... Austria has only one railway line and it will take her forty-five days to assemble 200,000 men." Although there were inevitable mistakes and confusion on the battlefield, Moltke's pre-war calculations were proved correct, and the Austrian army was brought to battle at Königgrätz and destroyed.

In contrast to the Prussian staff, Austrian staff officers gained their posts either by membership of the Austrian nobility and a desire to avoid tedious regimental duties, or after uninspiring training which made them into plodding, rule-bound clerks. In all aspects of preparation, planning and execution, their muddled efforts compared badly with that of their Prussian counterparts.

==== Prussian staff analysis and army improvements ====
In reviewing Prussian deficiencies against the Austrians, the General Staff made several improvements to increase the strategic and tactical proficiency of the King's army. Cavalry would no longer be held in reserve, but would actively screen the army's movements at all levels, make first contact with the enemy, and constantly observe hostile activities. Newly developed rifled artillery would no longer be placed in the rear of the order of march for employment behind the infantry; instead, a significant detachment would travel with the advanced guard of the leading corps or other major element, and the remainder would march with the front of the main body, providing immediate artillery coverage of the advanced guard on contact and of the main body during subsequent deployment on the field. A renewed emphasis was placed on maintaining contact with subordinate and superior commands, so that commanders always were informed of units' locations on the battlefield, reducing the "fog of war" effect. Finally, the introduction of the breech-loading infantry rifle marked a revolution in weapons effect, so that Moltke made the following analysis in 1865:

The attack of a position is becoming notably more difficult than its defense. The defensive during the first phase of battle offers a decisive superiority. The task of a skillful offensive will consist of forcing our foe to attack a position chosen by us, and only when casualties, demoralization, and exhaustion have drained his strength will we ourselves take up the tactical offensive.... Our strategy must be offensive, our tactics defensive.

==== Franco-Prussian War ====
The government of Napoleon III was undoubtedly startled by the Prussian victory over Austria, and urgently sought to reform their army to face the conflict with Prussia which seemed inevitable and imminent. Their senior officers entirely failed to grasp the methods of the Prussian General Staff. The Chief of Staff of the French Army, Maréchal de France Edmond Le Bœuf, fatuously stated in 1870 that the French Army was ready for war, "down to the last gaiter button." In the event, at the outset of the Franco-Prussian War, 462,000 German soldiers concentrated flawlessly on the French frontier while only 270,000 French soldiers could be moved to face them, the French army having lost 100,000 stragglers before a shot was fired through poor planning and administration. (Most of these were reservists who had not been able to join their units before the units were hastily dispatched to join the armies forming up near the frontier.)

During the war, there were again the inevitable mistakes due to the "fog of war", but German formations moved with a speed and precision which French staff officers, accustomed only to moving battalion-sized punitive columns, could not match. In the French army of the time, there was an anti-intellectual prejudice in favour of brave and unimaginative regimental officers over intelligent and well-trained staff officers. The French Army paid dearly for this bias in 1870 and 1871.

The result of the strategic preparation by Moltke (and diplomatic maneuvers by Chancellor Otto von Bismarck) was complete Prussian victory. After the victory, Germany was unified as the Prussia-dominated German Empire; King Wilhelm I of Prussia was proclaimed "German Emperor" on 18 January 1871. The German victory surprised many military professionals around the world. France had been considered a great military power while Prussia was widely considered a lesser power, despite its military successes in 1813–15 against Napoleon and more recently over Austria during the Seven Weeks' War of 1866. Many nations adopted Prussian staff methods and structures, with mixed success.

Throughout his tenure, Moltke pushed for the Prussian army to engage in reassessment and self-improvement at every command level to maintain tactical superiority relative to other nations. Moltke formalised the concept of mission-type tactics, which emphasized the importance of initiative at all levels of command, even the lowest. Every Prussian tactical manual published after the Franco-Prussian War included this passage:

A favorable situation will never be exploited if commanders wait for orders. The highest commander and the youngest soldier must always be conscious of the fact that omission and inactivity are worse than resorting to the wrong expedient.

=== From unification to World War I ===
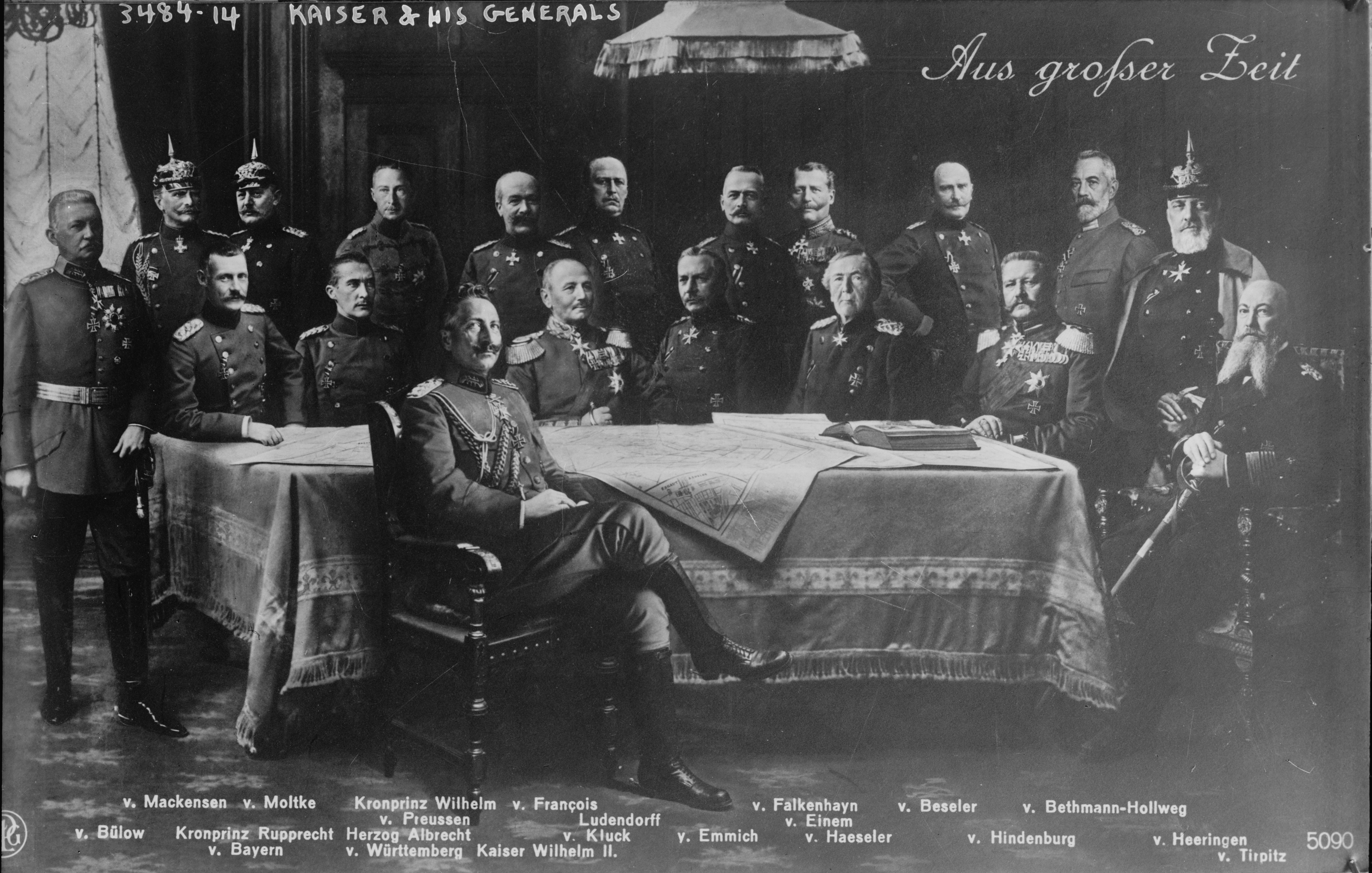
Wilhelm II with his generals

With unification the Prussian General Staff became the Imperial German General Staff, with seconded general staff officers from Saxony, Württemberg and Bavaria, and was responsible for military planning for the German Empire. They began preparing for what seemed to be another inevitable war with France, which was intent on revenge and recovery of the provinces annexed by Germany. Bismarck's diplomatic skill had prevented any hostile European coalition forming against Germany, but the young Kaiser William II replaced him in 1890 and turned away from their friendly accommodation with Russia in favor of an alliance with Austria-Hungary. Before long France and Russia allied.

Therefore, an encircled Germany faced the probability that of war on both Eastern and Western fronts. Prior to his retirement in 1888, Moltke's plan for such a conflict had always been to remain on the defensive against the French while committing the majority of German forces to face Russia. Changing geopolitical factors around the turn of the century, including the establishment of vast European colonial empires and especially the rapprochement between the United Kingdom and France eventually led the German General Staff to reassess the wisdom of such a strategy. Whereas Moltke and his immediate successor Alfred von Waldersee were confident in the ability of a relatively modest German garrison to defend the country's western frontier against the forces of Metropolitan France indefinitely, the General Staff under Alfred von Schlieffen determined that British neutrality in a future conflict could no longer be counted on, thus exposing Germany to the potential combined might of the British, French and their vast colonial empires in the west in case of any extended conflict.

To meet such a threat, Schlieffen and his successor Helmuth von Moltke the Younger drew up and continually refined the Schlieffen Plan to meet this eventuality. The Plan committed Germany to an early offensive against France while Russia was still mobilising and also required the invasion of neutral Belgium, effectively discounting any realistic prospect of maintaining British neutrality. In Bismarck's German constitution the Kaiser commanded the army and also appointed the chancellor and his cabinet, who had no control of the military. The elected representatives in the Reichstag were needed to pass budgets, but aside from this had no power over the conduct of the government. This was one of the seeds of the mass destruction of the First World War, as military planning was not subject to political control. Thus, the Schlieffen Plan was adopted without political input, even though it required the violation of the neutrality of Belgium, which the Germans had guaranteed by treaty. Nor was the German Navy's high command informed. It failed to take adequate account of logistics and the inability of horse-drawn transport to supply troops far from rail-heads. The plan has been accused of being too rigid. The philosopher Manuel de Landa argues that the Prussian army now favored the Jominian theory, which gave preeminence to the Army and to its autonomy, compared to the civilian control advocated by Clausewitz.

To an extent, the General Staff focused on perfecting the methods which had gained victory in the late nineteenth century. Although he maintained a formal demeanor, Moltke the Elder had been a flexible and innovative thinker in many fields. Schlieffen, by comparison, was a single-minded military specialist.

Nor had the General Staff, before the war, considered the use of potential allies such as Turkey, or dissident factions within the French, British and Russian empires, to distract or weaken the Allied war effort. "A swift victory over the main armies in the main theatre of war was the German General Staff's solution for all outside difficulties, and absolved them from thinking of war in its wider aspects."

The General Staff mistakenly predicted that China would win the First Sino-Japanese War.

==== Organization ====
The General Staff was divided between the central Großer Generalstab in Berlin and the general staffs of the corps and division HQs. The head of the Großer Generalstab was the "Chief of the General Staff" and was also the technical superior of all general staff officers. The Chief of the General Staff's chief deputy held the title of Generalquartiermeister. Beneath them were the five Oberquartiermeisters, who supervised the heads of the General Staff departments. The Railroad Department had the largest number of officers assigned, while the Second Department was the most important.

- Chief of the General Staff
  - Central Department
  - 6th Department: Annual Maneuver
  - Military History Department II: Older wars
- Oberquartiermeister I
  - 2nd Department: Operations
  - Railroad Department
  - 4th Department: Foreign Fortifications
- Oberquartiermeister II
  - 3rd Department: France and Great Britain
  - 9th Department: Netherland, Belgium, Switzerland, Spain, Italy, German Colonies
- Oberquartiermeister III
  - 5th Department: Operational studies
  - 8th Department: Kriegsakademie
- Oberquartiermeister IV
  - 1st Department: Scandinavia, Russia, Turkey
  - 10th Department: Austria-Hungary and the Balkans
- Oberquartiermeister V
  - Military History Department I: Recent wars
  - Archives and Library

=== World War I ===
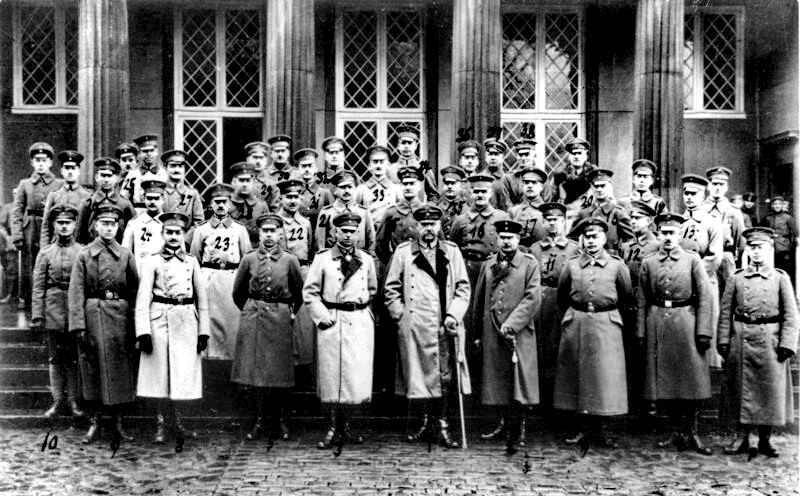
The German General Staff in Kassel, November 1918

In August 1914, following the pre-war mobilization plan, most of the General Staff, including the Oberquartiermeisters, were reassigned to the headquarters of the Armies and Corps. The remaining core became the "General Staff of the Field Army", part of the Oberste Heeresleitung (OHL, Supreme Army Command). The General Staff was streamlined into only three departments; Operations, Intelligence and Political Affairs.

The need for the system was promptly demonstrated when Supreme Commander Kaiser Wilhelm II proposed to concentrate against Russia, not France. Chief of the General Staff Helmuth von Moltke the Younger and Generalquartiermeister, Hermann von Stein convinced him that this was unthinkable because the thousands of orders could not be quickly rewritten and because the French with their quicker mobilization and excellent railways would be attacking a German border in force long before the Russians. One of the eight German Armies was commanded by Crown Prince Wilhelm of Prussia, paired with Konstantin Schmidt von Knobelsdorf, a senior general staff officer — the kaiser instructed his thirty-two-year-old son: "whatever he advises you must do". The system also removed uncertainty about the competence of Army Commanders Rupprecht, Crown Prince of Bavaria and Albrecht, Duke of Württemberg, though both were well-trained soldiers. Other armies were commanded by highly experienced staff officers, for example Paul von Hindenburg was given command of the Eighth Army, the only one facing the Russians invading East Prussia, with Erich Ludendorff as chief of staff.

The interactions between a commander and his chief of staff were elucidated by a successful practitioner of both roles, Hans von Seeckt

The decision is taken in private, and when the two men come out, there is only one decision. They have amalgamated it; they share one mind with each other. Should the opinions have differed, in the evening of this happy day in a military marriage the two halves will no longer know who gave in. The outside world and military history will not have knowledge of a domestic quarrel. The competence of command and control is based on this fusion of the two personalities. It does not matter if the order bears the commander's signature, or if the Chief of Staff has signed it for the High Command (today 'For the commander') according to our old custom. The commander always issues his orders through his Chief of Staff, and even the most senior subordinate leader must submit himself to his orders without objection, because his orders will always be given on behalf of the supreme commander.

The Schlieffen Plan was scuttled when the shaken Moltke ordered the German right wing in France to retire during the First Battle of the Marne. Soon Moltke was replaced by Erich von Falkenhayn who was already the Prussian war minister. After failing to dislodge the Entente in Flanders, he put the Western Front on the defensive. He was replaced at the war ministry in early 1915, and in 1916 Hindenburg and Ludendorff took over as advisers to the supreme commander. They led OHL in aggressively intervening in German political and economic life, changing the original goal of defending Germany's borders to conquest and expansion. A consequence of wartime attrition was the premature deployment of Kriegsakademie students to army and corps general staffs, some of them before reaching their second year curriculum. Later, standards for General Staff assignment were altered due to the closure of the Kriegsakademie, to allow examined officers to serve as staff apprentices, raising concerns that these new General Staff Corps officers were not evaluated or trained at the level of those they were replacing.

Superior German staff work at division, corps and army level throughout the war was a major contributor to their run of successes. At the beginning of 1918 — having defeated the Russians — Hindenburg and Ludendorff resolved to win in the west. Tactically, their staff work was brilliant. Using only weapons that had failed at Verdun, they devised a long, comprehensive list of measures to smash through enemy field fortifications, which were then taught to all ranks in the attacking units. The German Army had tactical success during the Spring Offensive, but the Allies held strategic points. They were sure that a series of successful breakthroughs would snap their enemy's resolve, ignoring the fact that each victory sapped German strength, while their foes were continually strengthened by Americans flooding into France. The Germans were overwhelmed during the Hundred Days Offensive, and eventually agreed to an Armistice of 11 November 1918 with the Allies.

=== Interwar period ===
The victors' fear was encapsulated by the clause in the Treaty of Versailles: "The Great German General Staff and all similar organisations shall be dissolved and may not be reconstituted in any form." The German Army was limited to 4,000 officers. The Weimar Republic's armed forces, the Reichswehr, was led by Hans von Seeckt. He camouflaged the General Staff by renaming it the Truppenamt ("troop office"), and selected many General Staff officers to fill the available places. The War Academy (Kriegsakademie) was abolished, but training of General Staff officers continued, dispersed among the Wehrkreise (Military District) headquarters but overseen by tutors from the Truppenamt. General Staff officers continued to play major roles in the nation, most strikingly when former chief of staff Paul von Hindenburg was elected Reichspräsident in 1925.

When Adolf Hitler became Reichskanzler in 1933, he instructed the Truppenamt/General Staff to ignore the Versailles restrictions; he would create a greatly expanded Wehrmacht, including the Army, the Navy, and a new Air Force. A new War Academy (Kriegsakademie) was established in 1935. The General Staff advised Hitler that the Army could not be fully modernized until 1944 or 1945. When Hitler went to war in 1939, the tank columns were still followed by horse-drawn artillery pieces. Throughout the war, German industry was unable to furnish small arms in sufficient quantities, forcing the Army to rely heavily on older weapons, prizes of war, and adaptations of former designs produced in conquered countries, thus producing an arsenal filled with an array of incompatible pieces, unlike the smaller variety of standard small arms used by the Allies.

Initially, the Army's leaders feared that their leading role as the defenders of Germany would be usurped by the unruly SA, the Nazi party's political militia. When Hitler suppressed the SA in the Night of the Long Knives, the army stood aside and effectually acquiesced in the extrajudicial murders involved, including those of army officers. While the General Staff welcomed Hitler's expansion of the army, they were opposed to many of his wilder schemes and continually urged caution. When several of Hitler's early moves such as the remilitarization of the Rhineland, the Anschluss with Austria and the occupation of the Sudetenland succeeded despite advice from the General Staff that these might bring about a premature war with France and Britain, Hitler was further convinced that his intuition was superior to the General Staff's intellectual analysis.

When Hindenburg died, the Army replaced their oath to the constitution with one to the Führer Adolf Hitler. Hitler was soon able to curtail the Army's traditional independence, by the fortuitous disgrace of the commander in chief of the armed forces, Werner von Blomberg, and false accusations of homosexuality against the commander in chief of the army, Werner von Fritsch. (The combined scandals were known as the Blomberg–Fritsch affair.)

The armed forces command structure was changed by Hitler in 1938, with an Armed Forces HQ (the Oberkommando der Wehrmacht, usually contracted to OKW) placed over the army command (Oberkommando des Heeres or OKH) and the other service commands, and almost entirely displacing the Reich War Ministry. However, OKW from its inception had generally weaker, more pliant staff officers than OKH and the Luftwaffe. A weakness of both the Kriegsakademie curriculum and General Staff doctrine was that it focused primarily on tactical and operational matters. There was no institution comparable to the United States National War College or the British Imperial Defence College where higher-ranking officers of all services could study wider economic, political and diplomatic issues related to broad strategy.

Since commanders were no longer selected by pedigree, the chiefs of staff were no longer joint commanders. Their role was

The commander must be supported by obedient, independent and critical advising General Staff officers (Fuehrergehilfen). They provide him with information and advice, prepare decisions, turn them into orders and measures and supervise their execution. If necessary, they urge the commander to decide and act. Their thinking and actions must be guided by his will and intentions and must be determined by his decisions and orders.

=== World War II ===
Towards the end of the War of 1914 to 1918, the General Staff had almost wholly usurped the political power of the state. At the beginning of World War II, by contrast, its influence was less than it had been at the outset of the First World War and actually declined during the war.

In part this was due to the increasing pre-eminence of the other branches of the German armed forces, in particular of the Luftwaffe. The commander in chief of the Luftwaffe, Hitler's friend and political colleague Hermann Göring, always had personal influence with Hitler which no Army leader had. Another was the increasing tension between OKH and OKW. While the need for a joint headquarters to coordinate the work of all the services was desirable in theory, for example to determine industrial and manpower priorities and avoid duplication of effort, OKW was increasingly used as an alternate Army planning staff by Hitler. At the same time, OKW failed in its task of overseeing the overall war effort, resulting in wasteful diversion of resources to several competing and unregulated forces (such as the SS) responsible only to themselves or to Hitler alone.

After 1941, OKH was largely responsible for operations on the Eastern Front only (and administration of the army as a whole), while OKW directed operations on the other fronts. There were now effectively two general staffs, often competing with each other, with arbitration of all disputes in the hands of Hitler, further increasing his personal power. Finally, in late 1941, Hitler dismissed Field Marshal Walther von Brauchitsch, the commander in chief of the Army, and assumed direct command of the Army himself. From this time onwards, neither OKW nor OKH could independently plan or conduct operations, but merely implemented Hitler's often flawed commands.

At a lower level, training of General Staff officers continued, but the course was still almost as long, intense, and exclusive as in peacetime. Properly-trained staff officers became increasingly scarce, and in some cases newly qualified staff officers lacked the dedication or moral courage of their predecessors.

==== 20 July plot ====
Before and during the early part of the war, some General Staff officers, notably the Chief, Franz Halder, considered a coup d'état to remove Hitler from power, and avoid what they believed would be a disastrous and premature war. They planned a coup as response to Hitler ordering war on Czechoslovakia to seize the Sudetenland, when Britain and France were opposed. But France and Britain capitulated at Munich, which removed the danger of war and justified Hitler's policy; the dissidents let the matter drop. In November 1939, Halder, still fearing the war would end in disaster, discussed a coup with Army C-in-C von Brauchitsch and Carl Goerdeler of the Schwarze Kapelle, but finally decided Hitler was untouchable until Germany met a "setback".

Opposition to Hitler nevertheless continued, including among the General Staff officers of the Ersatzheer ("Replacement Army"), which had charge of all new troops being organized in Germany for the field army. They set up Operation Valkyrie, in which Ersatzheer detachments would take control of Germany. On 20 July 1944, the conspirators tried to kill Hitler, thought they had succeeded, and initiated Valkyrie. But most line officers and the bulk of the General Staff refused to obey the Valkyrie plotters; when Hitler was known to be alive, the coup collapsed entirely.

However, many General Staff officers were clearly implicated in the plot, and the General Staff was revealed as a center of dissent. In the months after 20 July, several dozen General Staff officers were arrested and in most cases executed. Also, Luftwaffe, SS, or "National Socialist Leadership Officers" were appointed to positions normally occupied by General Staff officers in new or rebuilt formations.

== Bundeswehr ==
On May 15, 1957, the first chief of staff of the Bundeswehr, General Heusinger, spoke at the opening of the new Army Academy (Heeresakademie), pointing out that General Staff officers are "the defenders and guardians of the values of German military tradition", extending back 147 years. German students are admitted to the Army Academy after studying at a Federal Armed Forces University (Universität der Bundeswehr) in Munich or Hamburg, followed by several years of line duty. Officers from other NATO countries are their classmates. The academy also teaches a 10-month Army General Staff Officer Course for officers from non-NATO countries.

In the Bundeswehr there are General Staff officers, but no General Staff officer branch or corps. The chief of staff of the Federal Armed Forces is the supreme military representative of the Bundeswehr and the principal military adviser to the Government. In the event of war the Federal Republic of Germany is the only NATO country which immediately relinquishes operational command over all combat units of her armed forces to NATO commanders. Hence the Bundeswehr does no operational defense planning, which was the classic task of former German General Staffs. Therefore, the role of the General Staff officer is as the adviser to an operational commander, "his main task is to advise his commander in all matters, and he is entitled to the commander's attention".

Most General Staff officers are graduates of the Federal Armed Forces Command and General Staff Academy (Führungsakademie) in Hamburg. General Staff officers are rotated through line commands to keep them familiar with everyday unit problems. General Staff officers are identified by crimson facings on their uniforms and by inserting "i. G." (im Generalstabsdienst) after their rank. Less than four per cent of officers are members of the General Staff. There are five General Staff officers in each Bundeswehr division. At the headquarters of Allied Forces Central Europe in Brunssum Netherlands there are roughly one hundred German officers, but only seventeen are General Staff officers.

The Bundeswehr retains the German army's tradition of mission-oriented command and control (Auftragstaktik). Moreover, "lower-rank officers are frequently superiors of higher-rank officers".

== Leadership ==
† denotes people who died in office.

=== Chiefs of the Prussian General Staff ===
No.	Portrait	Chefs des Großen Generalstabs	Took office	Left office	Time in office
1	Gerhard von Scharnhorst	Gerhard von Scharnhorst (1755–1813)	1 March 1808	17 June 1810	2 years, 108 days
2	Karl von Hake	Karl von Hake (1768–1835)	17 June 1810	March 1812	2 years
3	Gustav von Rauch	Gustav von Rauch (1774–1841)	March 1812	March 1813	1 year
(1)	Gerhard von Scharnhorst	Gerhard von Scharnhorst (1755–1813)	March 1813	28 June 1813 †	3 months
4	August Neidhardt von Gneisenau	August Neidhardt von Gneisenau (1760–1831)	28 June 1813	3 June 1814	340 days
5	Karl von Grolman	Karl von Grolman (1777–1843)	3 June 1814	November 1819	5 years
6	Johann Rühle von Lilienstern	Johann Rühle von Lilienstern (1780–1847)	November 1819	11 January 1821	1 year
7	Karl Freiherr von Müffling	Karl Freiherr von Müffling (1775–1851)	11 January 1821	29 January 1829	8 years, 18 days
8	Wilhelm von Krauseneck	Wilhelm von Krauseneck (1774–1850)	29 January 1829	13 May 1848	19 years, 105 days
9	Karl von Reyher	Karl von Reyher (1786–1857)	13 May 1848	7 October 1857 †	9 years, 147 days
10	Helmuth von Moltke the Elder	Helmuth von Moltke the Elder (1800–1891)	7 October 1857	18 January 1871	13 years, 103 days

=== Chiefs of the German General Staff ===
No.	Portrait	Chefs des Großen Generalstabs	Took office	Left office	Time in office
1	Helmuth von Moltke the Elder	Generalfeldmarschall; Helmuth von Moltke the Elder (1800–1891)	18 January 1871	10 August 1888	17 years, 205 days
2	Alfred von Waldersee	General der Kavallerie; Alfred von Waldersee (1832–1904)	10 August 1888	7 February 1891	2 years, 181 days
3	Alfred von Schlieffen	General der Kavallerie; Alfred von Schlieffen (1833–1913)	7 February 1891	1 January 1906	14 years, 328 days
4	Helmuth von Moltke the Younger	Generaloberst; Helmuth von Moltke the Younger (1848–1916) (Note: Nephew of Moltke the Elder.)	1 January 1906	14 September 1914	8 years, 256 days
5	Erich von Falkenhayn	General der Infanterie; Erich von Falkenhayn (1861–1922)	14 September 1914	29 August 1916	1 year, 350 days
6	Paul von Hindenburg	Generalfeldmarschall; Paul von Hindenburg (1847–1934)	29 August 1916	3 July 1919	2 years, 308 days
7	Wilhelm Groener	Generalleutnant; Wilhelm Groener (1867–1939)	3 July 1919	7 July 1919	4 days
8	Hans von Seeckt	Generaloberst; Hans von Seeckt (1866–1936)	7 July 1919	15 July 1919	8 days

==== First Quartermasters-General ====
No.	Portrait	Erster Generalquartiermeister	Took office	Left office	Time in office
1	Erich Ludendorff	General der Infanterie; Erich Ludendorff (1865–1937)	29 August 1916	26 October 1918	2 years, 58 days
2	Wilhelm Groener	Generalleutnant; Wilhelm Groener (1867–1939)	30 October 1918	15 July 1919	258 days

=== Chiefs of the Troop Office ===
No.	Portrait	Chefs des Truppenamtes	Took office	Left office	Time in office
1	Hans von Seeckt	Generalmajor; Hans von Seeckt (1866–1936)	11 October 1919	26 March 1920	167 days
2	Wilhelm Heye	Generalmajor; Wilhelm Heye (1869–1947)	26 March 1920	February 1923	2 years, 10 months
3	Otto Hasse	Generalmajor; Otto Hasse (1871–1942)	February 1923	October 1925	2 years, 8 months
4	Georg Wetzell	Generalmajor; Georg Wetzell (1869–1947)	October 1925	27 January 1927	1 year, 3 months
5	Werner von Blomberg	Generalmajor; Werner von Blomberg (1878–1946)	27 January 1927	30 September 1929	2 years, 246 days
6	Baron Kurt von Hammerstein-Equord	Generalmajor; Baron Kurt von Hammerstein-Equord (1878–1943)	30 September 1929	31 October 1930	1 year, 31 days
7	Wilhelm Adam	Generalmajor; Wilhelm Adam (1877–1949)	31 October 1930	30 September 1933	2 years, 334 days
8	Ludwig Beck	Generalmajor; Ludwig Beck (1880–1944)	1 October 1933	1 July 1935	1 year, 273 days

=== Chiefs of Staff of the Army High Command (OKH) ===
No.	Portrait	Chefs des Oberkommandos des Heeres	Took office	Left office	Time in office
1	Ludwig Beck	Generaloberst; Ludwig Beck (1880–1944)	1 July 1935	31 August 1938	3 years, 61 days
2	Franz Halder	Generaloberst; Franz Halder (1884–1972)	1 September 1938	24 September 1942	4 years, 23 days
3	Kurt Zeitzler	Generaloberst; Kurt Zeitzler (1895–1963)	24 September 1942	10 June 1944	1 year, 260 days
–	Adolf Heusinger	Generalleutnant; Adolf Heusinger (1897–1982); Acting (Note: Later served as the Inspector General of the Bundeswehr (1957–1961) and the Chair of the NATO Military Committee (1961–1964).)	10 June 1944	21 July 1944	41 days
–	Heinz Guderian	Generaloberst; Heinz Guderian (1888–1954); Acting	21 July 1944	28 March 1945	250 days
4	Hans Krebs	General der Infanterie; Hans Krebs (1898–1945) (Note: Committed suicide at the conclusion of the Battle of Berlin, along with General Wilhelm Burgdorf.)	1 April 1945	2 May 1945 †	31 days

=== Chief of Staff of the Armed Forces High Command (OKW) ===
No.	Portrait	Chef des Oberkommandos der Wehrmacht	Took office	Left office	Time in office
1	Wilhelm Keitel	Generalfeldmarschall; Wilhelm Keitel (1882–1946) (Note: Executed following the Nuremberg trials.)	4 February 1938	8 May 1945	7 years, 93 days
2	Alfred Jodl	Generaloberst; Alfred Jodl (1890–1946)	13 May 1945	23 May 1945	10 days

== See also ==
- Glossary of German military terms
- Staff (military)

== Printed sources ==
- Addington, Larry H. (1971). The Blitzkrieg Era and the German General Staff, 1865–1941. New Brunswick, N.J.: Rutgers University Press. ISBN 0-8135-0704-9.
- Boot, Max (2006). War Made New : Technology, Warfare, and the Course of History, 1500 to Today. New York: Gotham. ISBN 978-1-59240-222-9.
- Bucholz, Arden. Hans Delbrück and the German Military Establishment: War Images in Conflict. Iowa City: University of Iowa Press, 1985.
- Bucholz, Arden. Moltke, Schlieffen and Prussian War Planning. New York: Berg, 1991
- Buk-Swienty, Tom (2015). 1864 : the forgotten war that shaped modern Europe. London: Profile Books. ISBN 9781781252765.
- Delbrück, Hans (1894). Das Leben des Feldmarschalls Grafen Neidhardt von Gneisenau (2 ed.). Berlin: H. Walther.
- Dupuy, Trevor N. (1977). A Genius for War: The German Army and General Staff, 1897–1945. London: Prentice Hall. largely derivative in nature (Goerlitz and others) but easy reading
- Dyer, Gwynne (1985). War. Toronto: Stoddart. ISBN 0-517-55615-4. (New York: Crown ISBN shown)
- John King Fairbank; Kwang-Ching Liu; Denis Crispin Twitchett, eds. (1978). Late Ch'ing, 1800-1911. Vol. 11, Part 2 of The Cambridge History of China Series (illustrated ed.). Cambridge University Press. ISBN 9780521220293.
- Foley, Robert (2004). Alfred von Schlieffen's Military Writings. London: Frank Cass. ISBN 0-7146-4999-6.
- Goerlitz, Walter (1985). History of the German General Staff, 1657–1945. Boulder, Colorado: Westview Press. ISBN 0-8133-0195-5.
- Herwig, Holger (2009). The Marne, 1914 : the opening of World War I and the battle that changed the world. New York: Random House.
- Hindenburg, Marshal von (1921). Out of my life. Translated by F. A. Holt. New York: Harper & Brothers.
- Howard, Michael (1961). The Franco-Prussian War. London: Routledge. ISBN 0-415-02787-X.
- Hughes, Daniel J., ed. Moltke on the Art of War: Selected Writings. Novato, CA: Presidio, 1993.
- Jonas, Klaus W. (1961). The Life of Crown Prince William. Translated by C. W. Bangert. London: Routledge & Kegan Paul.
- Landa, Manuel de (1991). War in the Age of Intelligent Machines. New York: Zone Books. ISBN 0-942299-76-0.
- Liddell Hart, Basil (1930). History of the First World War. London: Pan. ISBN 0-330-23354-8.
- McElwee, William (1974). The Art of War: Waterloo to Mons. London: Purnell. ISBN 0-253-31075-X.
- Millotat, Oberst i.G. Christian O.E. (1992). Understanding the Prussian-German General Staff System (PDF). Carlisle Barracks, PA: Strategic Studies Institute. Archived (PDF) from the original on October 14, 2016. This article incorporates text from this source, which is in the public domain.
- Mombauer, Annika. Helmuth von Moltke and the Origins of the First World War. Cambridge, GB: Cambridge University Press, 2001.
- Overy, Richard (1996). Why the Allies Won: Explaining Victory in World War II. Pimlico. ISBN 978-0-7126-7453-9.
- Seeckt, General-Colonel Hans von (1929). Gedanken eines Soldaten. Berlin: Mittler.
- Stone, David (2011). Twilight of the Gods: The Decline and Fall of the German General Staff in World War II. Conway. ISBN 978-1844861361.
- Stoneman, Mark R. Wilhelm Groener, Officering and the Schlieffen Plan. PhD, Georgetown University, 2006. abstract
- Van Creveld, Martin (1977). Supplying War. Cambridge: Cambridge University Press. ISBN 0-521-21730-X.
- Vogt, Adolf (1974). Oberst Max Bauer : Generalstabsoffizier in Zwielicht 1869–1929. Osnabrück: Biblio Verlag.
- Wawro, Geoffrey (1997). The Austro-Prussian War: Austria's War with Prussia and Italy in 1866. Cambridge: Cambridge University Press. ISBN 9780521629515.
- Wheeler-Bennett, John (1967). The Nemesis of Power: The German Army In Politics, 1918–1945. London: Macmillan. OCLC 72387321.
- Wilkinson, Spenser (1895). The Brain of an Army : A Popular Account of the German General Staff (2nd ed.). Westminster: Archibald Constable.
- Zabecki, David (2008). Chief of Staff: Napoleonic Wars to World War I. New York: Naval Institute Press. ISBN 978-1591149903.
- Zuber, Terence (2011). The Real German War Plan 1904–14. Stroud, Gloucestershire: History Press. ISBN 978-0-7524-5664-5.
