= 3rd Hussars =

The 3rd Hussars or 3rd Hussar Regiment may refer to the following military units:

- 3rd The King's Own Hussars, a former British Army cavalry regiment
- 3rd (Brandenburg) Hussars “von Zieten”, a former hussar regiment of the Royal Prussian Army
