= Karl Freiherr von Müffling =

German general and cartographer (1775–1851)

Freiherr Karl von Müffling
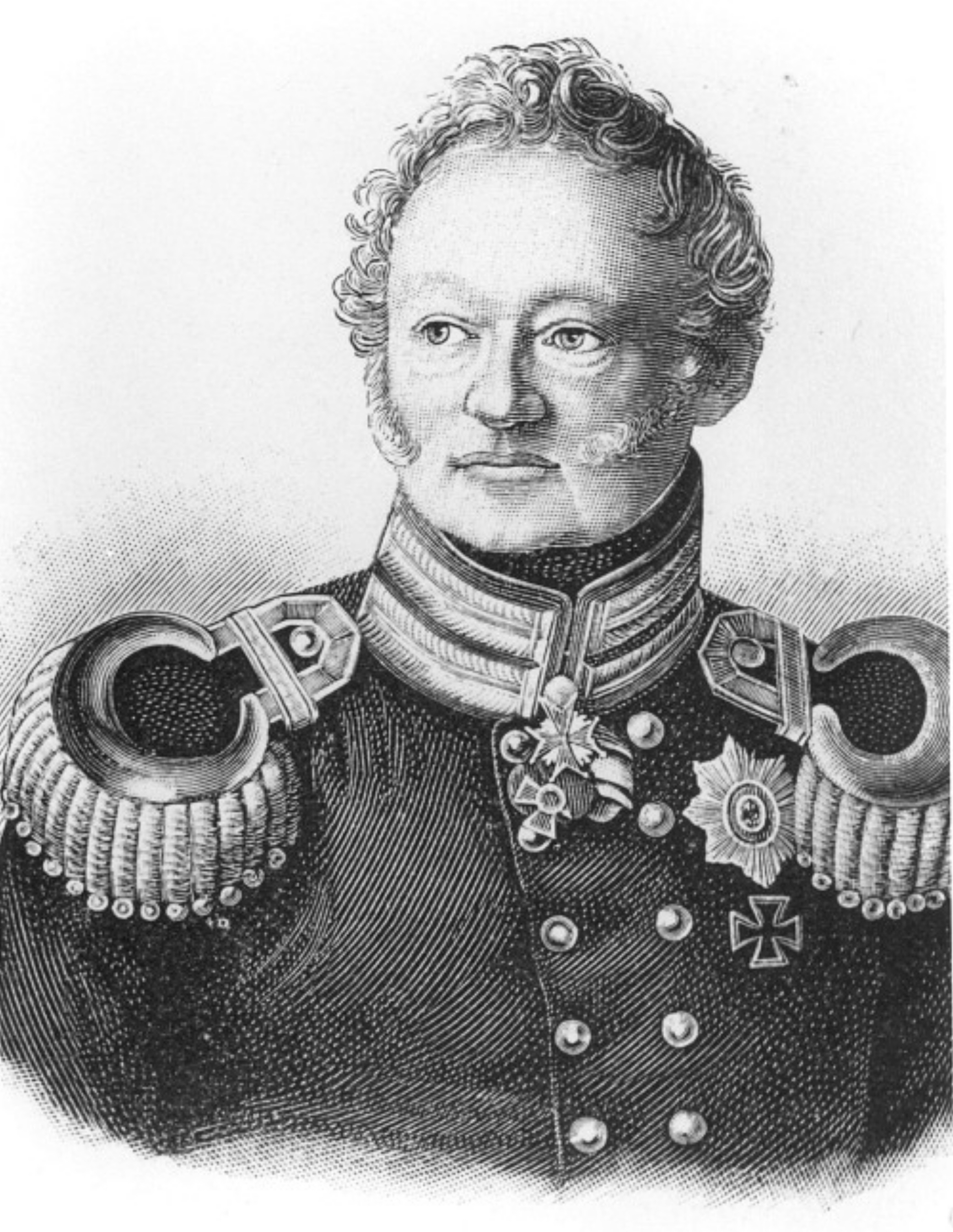
- Karl von Muffling, c.1837
- Born: 12 June 1775; Halle, Kingdom of Prussia
- Died: 10 January 1851 (aged 75); Berlin, Kingdom of Prussia
- Military career
- Allegiance: Kingdom of Prussia
- Branch: Prussian Army
- Service years: 1787–1847
- Rank: Generalfeldmarshall
- Nickname: Weiss
- Conflicts: War of the First Coalition
- Awards: Iron Cross; Pour le Mérite (military); Order of the Black Eagle

Friedrich Karl Ferdinand Freiherr von Müffling, nicknamed Weiss (12 June 1775 – 10 January 1851), was a Prussian Generalfeldmarschall and military theorist. He served as Blücher's liaison officer in Wellington's headquarters during the Battle of Waterloo and was one of the organizers of the final victory over Napoleon. After the wars he served a diplomatic role at the Congress of Aix-la-Chappelle and was a major contributor to the development of the Prussian General Staff as Chief. Müffling also specialized in military topography and cartography.

== Biography ==
Born in Halle, Müffling entered the Prussian army in 1790.

In 1799 Müffling contributed to a military dictionary edited by Lieutenant W. von Leipziger, and in the winter of 1802–1803, being then a subaltern, he was appointed to the newly formed general staff as quartermaster-lieutenant. He had already done survey work, and was now charged with survey duties under the astronomer Franz Xaver, Baron Von Zach (1754–1832). In 1805, when in view of a war with France the army was placed on a war footing, Müffling was promoted captain and assigned to the general staffs, successively, of General von Wartensleben, Frederick Louis, Prince of Hohenlohe-Ingelfingen and Gebhard Leberecht von Blücher.

In 1806 Müffling served under Hohenlohe, Karl August, Grand Duke of Saxe-Weimar-Eisenach, and Blücher, and was included in the capitulation of the latter's corps at Ratekau on 7 November 1806, the day after the Battle of Lübeck. After this he entered the civil service of the Duke of Weimar. He rejoined the army on the outbreak of the German Campaign of 1813, and was placed on the headquarters staff of the Army of Silesia.

The death of Gerhard von Scharnhorst from a wound received at Lützen forced a reorganization of the Prussian Army's command. August von Gneisenau succeeded Scharnhorst as Chief of Staff to Blucher. Müffling in turn was appointed as his deputy (Generalquartiermeister), although Gneisenau would have preferred Carl von Clausewitz.

His business qualities and common sense were greatly valued, though the temperamental differences between Müffling and Gneisenau often led to friction, especially as the former was in a measure the representative of the antiquated topographical school of strategists, to whom (rightly in the main) the disaster of the Battle of Jena was attributed. In the interval between the first occupation of Paris and the Hundred Days, Müffling served as chief of the staff to the Russian General Michael Andreas Barclay de Tolly and to General Friedrich Graf Kleist von Nollendorf. He was Prussian commissioner at the Duke of Wellington's headquarters in the Waterloo campaign, and was involved in the various controversies which centred round the events at the Battle of Waterloo on 18 June 1815.

After the final fall of Napoleon Müffling was a signatory to the Convention of St. Cloud and later served on the staff of the Army of Occupation in France. For some months he was military governor of Paris. He spent a part of his time on the Rhine in survey work, and was employed by King Frederick William III in various diplomatic missions. In 1821 he became chief of the general staff at Berlin, and though he has been accused of indulging his taste for topographical work at the expense of training for war, his work was not wasted, for he gave an excellent organization to the general staff, and executed elaborate and useful surveys. In 1829 he visited Constantinople and St Petersburg in connection with negotiations for peace between Russia and Turkey. He took a prominent part in the military and civil history of Prussia, and from 1838 to 1847 was governor of Berlin. He was also the inventor of a system of hachuring for maps. Failing health compelled his retirement in the latter year, and he died on 10 January 1851, at his estate of Ringhofen.

== Works ==
Under the initials of C(arl) von W(eiss), Muffling wrote various important works on military art and history:

- Operations plan der preuss-sächs. Armee 1800 (Weimar, 1807)
- marginalia on the archduke Charles's Grundsätze der höheren Kriegskunst für die Generäle der österreichischen Armee
- marginalia on Rühle von Lilienstern's Bericht über die Vorgänge bei der Hohenloheschen Armee 1806
- Die preussisch-russische Kampagne bis zum Waffenstillstande 1813 (Berlin, 1813)
- Geschichte der Armeen unter Wellington und Blücher 1819 (Stuttgart, 1817)
- Zur Kriegsgesch. der Jahre 1813-1814: die Feldzüge der schlesischen Armee von des Beendigung des Waffenstillstandes bis zur Eroberung von Paris (Berlin, 1824)
- Betrachtungen über die grossen Operationen und Schlachten 1813-1815 (Berlin, 1825)
- Napoleons Strategie 1813 (Berlin, 1827)
- an essay on the Roman roads on the lower Rhine (Berlin, 1834).

His reminiscences:

- Aus meinem Leben (Berlin, 1851).
- Narrative of my Missions to Constantinople and St. Petersburg, in the Years 1829 and 1830 (London, 1855); translated by David Jardine.

== Orders and decorations ==
- Kingdom of Prussia:
  - Iron Cross (1813), 1st Class
  - Pour le Mérite (military), with Oak Leaves, 3 June 1814
  - Service Award Cross
  - Knight of the Order of the Black Eagle, 18 November 1829; in Diamonds, 15 October 1840; with Collar 10 April 1847
- Austrian Empire: Knight of the Military Order of Maria Theresa, 1814
- Kingdom of France: Commander of the Military Merit Order
- Grand Duchy of Hesse: Grand Cross of the Ludwig Order
- Netherlands: Commander of the Military William Order, 22 March 1819
- Saxe-Weimar-Eisenach: Grand Cross of the Order of the White Falcon, 6 October 1817
- United Kingdom: Honorary Knight Commander of the Order of the Bath (military division), 20 October 1815
- Kingdom of Hanover: Grand Cross of the Royal Guelphic Order, 1825
- Russian Empire:
  - Knight of the Order of St. George, 4th Class, 10 December 1813; 3rd Class, 25 January 1817
  - Knight of the Order of St. Vladimir, 1st Class, 1829
  - Knight of the Order of St. Alexander Nevsky, in Diamonds, 1830
  - Knight of the Order of St. Andrew, in Diamonds, 8 October 1838
  - Knight of the Order of St. Anna, 1st Class in Diamonds

Military offices
Preceded by Johann Rühle von Lilienstern	Chief of the Prussian General Staff; 1821–1829	Succeeded by Wilhelm von Krauseneck
