= Wilhelm von Krauseneck =

Prussian military officer (1775–1850)

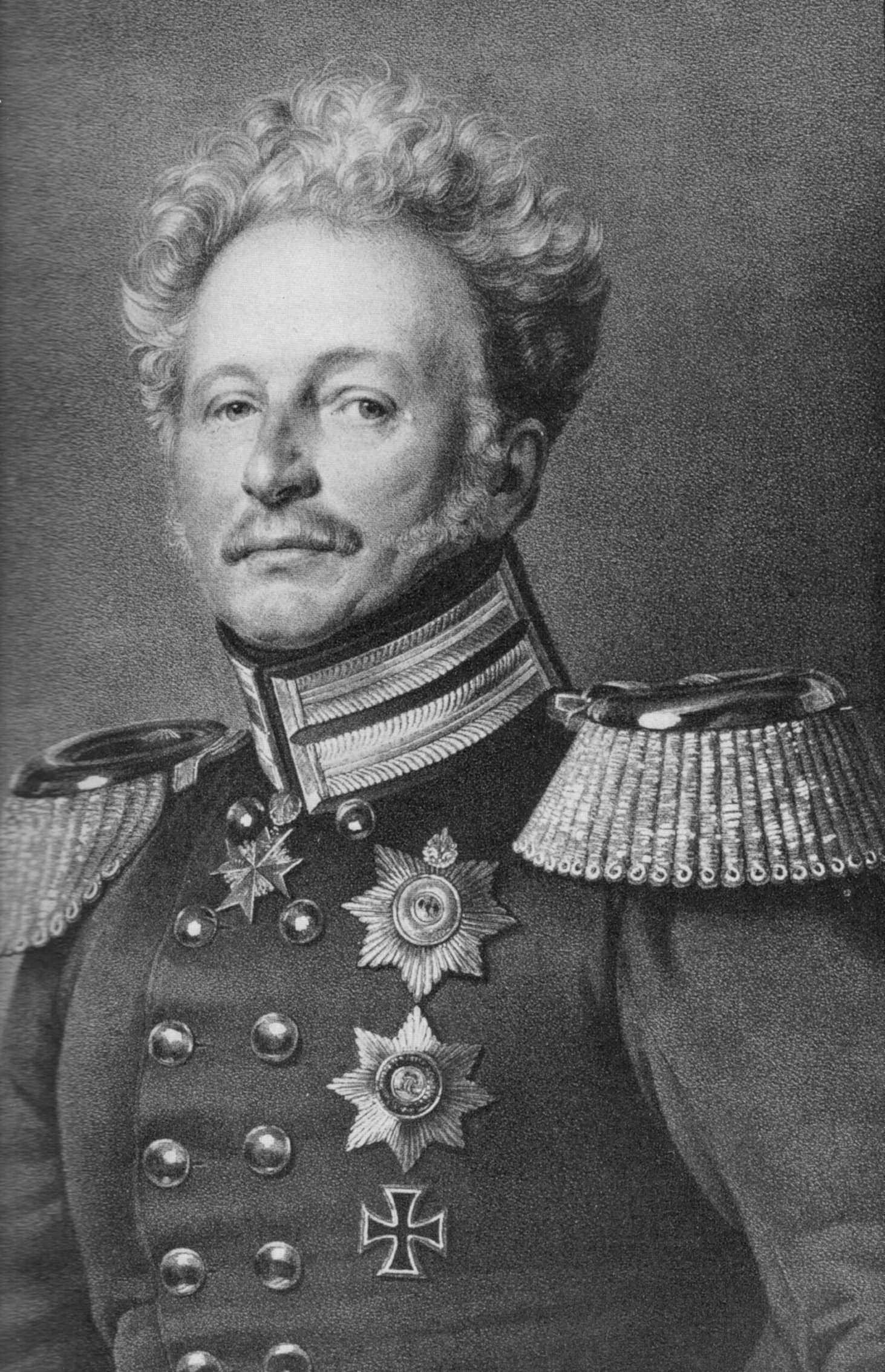
- Lithograph after a drawing by Franz Krüger.
- Born: Wilhelm Johann von Krauseneck; 13 October 1774; Bayreuth, Principality of Bayreuth
- Died: 2 November 1850 (aged 76); Berlin, Kingdom of Prussia
- Military career
- Allegiance: Kingdom of Prussia
- Branch: Prussian Army
- Service years: 1791–1848
- Rank: General der Infanterie
- Unit: 4th Grenadier Regiment
- Commands: Prussian General Staff (1829–1848)
- Conflicts: Napoleonic Wars; Revolutions of 1848
- Awards: See decorations section
- Other work: Member of the Prussian State Council

Wilhelm Johann von Krauseneck (13 October 1774 – 2 November 1850) was a Prussian military officer. He served as Chief of the Prussian General Staff from 1829 to 1848.

== Biography ==
=== Early career ===
In 1791, he began his training in the Prussian Army as a cadet at Plassenburg. He trained as a geographic engineer and in 1794 was sent to the territories taken over by the Kingdom of Prussia as part of the Second Partition of Poland, where he participated in surveying work. In 1797, he was promoted to Oberleutnant (first lieutenant) and assigned to the 2nd East Prussian Fusilier Brigade.

=== Napoleonic Wars ===
In 1806, he became commander of a company, which he led, among other events, in the Battle of Wackern. For his services in the battle, he was awarded the Pour le Mérite by King Frederick William III. In 1808, he was promoted to major and, at the request of General Gerhard von Scharnhorst, was transferred to artillery units. However, in 1809, Krauseneck applied for reassignment to the infantry and was granted a reassignment. That same year, he became a company commander in the 1st Foot Guard Regiment. In 1812, he was responsible for preparing regulations for the upcoming invasion of Russia and subsequently took command of the Grudziądz Fortress. A year later, he was assigned to the staff of the army commanded by Generalfeldmarschall (Field Marshal) Gebhard von Blücher and took part in the battles of Lützen and Bautzen. That same year, after being promoted to Oberstleutnant (lieutenant colonel), he became a regimental commander in General Bogislav von Tauentzien's brigade. However, he did not take direct command of the unit, as due to illness, he did not join it until 1814, by which time it had already been disbanded due to losses. Consequently, he again became a member of von Blücher's staff and participated in the Battle of Fère-Champenoise. At that time, he was awarded the Iron Cross 1st Class.

=== Later career ===
After the Treaty of Paris, he became commander of the Fortress of Mainz with the rank of Generalmajor (major general), a position he held until 1821, when he was appointed commander of the 6th Infantry Division. In 1829, he became Chief of the Prussian General Staff with the rank of Generalleutnant (lieutenant general). In this position, he advocated for Prussia's takeover of the fortresses in Ulm and Rastatt and approved the construction of new fortifications in Königsberg. In 1837, he was appointed a member of the Prussian State Council by King Frederick William III. He also implemented a new infantry training program, which came into effect in 1840. In 1842, he submitted a request to resign from his position, but Minister of War Hermann von Boyen rejected his request. The same happened in 1847. During the March Revolution, he initially opposed using the army against the demonstrators. However, under pressure from Crown Prince Wilhelm, he decided to bring the army into Berlin. After the unrest ended, he was supposed to replace von Boyen as Minister of War, but he declined and retired with the rank of General der Infanterie (general of the infantry). From 1842, he was colonel-in-chief of the 4th Grenadier Regiment.

== Decorations ==
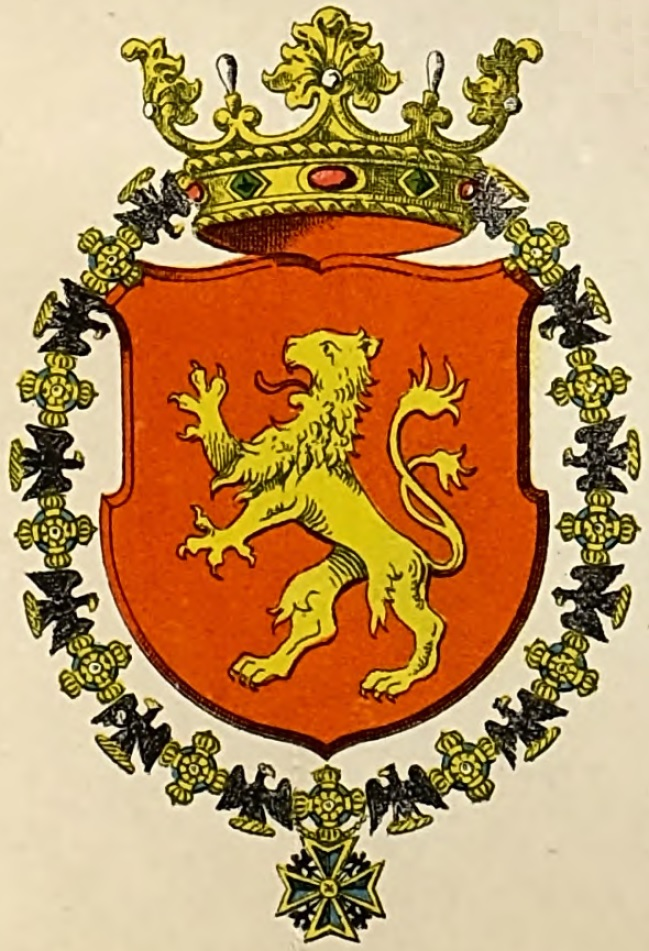
Krauseneck's coat of arms with the collar of the Order of the Black Eagle

Krauseneck's decorations (both domestic and foreign) include:

- Prussia:
  - Order of the Black Eagle with Diamonds
  - Pour le Mérite with Oak Leaves
  - Iron Cross
    - 1st Class
    - 2nd Class
- Hesse: Grand Cross of the Ludwig Order
- Austria: Commander of the Order of Leopold
- Russia:
  - Order of St. Andrew
  - Order of Saint Alexander Nevsky
  - Order of Saint Anna, 1st Class with Crown

== Bibliography ==
- Poten, Bernhard von (1883). "Krauseneck, Wilhelm von". Allgemeine Deutsche Biographie 17 (in German). pp. 82–84.

Military offices
| Preceded by Karl Freiherr von Müffling | Chief of the Prussian General Staff; 1829–1848 | Succeeded by Karl von Reyher |
