= Karl von Grolman =

Prussian general (1777–1843)

General of Infantry Karl von Grolman
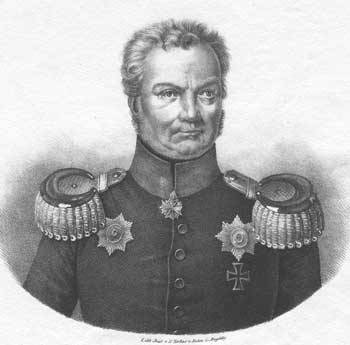

Chief of the Prussian General Staff
- In office 3 June 1814 – November 1819
- Monarch: Frederick William III
- Preceded by: August von Gneisenau
- Succeeded by: August von Lilienstern

Personal details
- Born: 30 July 1777 Berlin, Margraviate of Brandenburg, Kingdom of Prussia
- Died: 1 June 1843 (aged 65) Poznań, Province of Posen, Kingdom of Prussia
- Spouse: Sophie von Gerlach (m. 1804; died 1807) Hedwig von Rotenhan (m. 1816)
- Children: 10
- Awards: Order of the Black Eagle

Military service
- Allegiance: (Kingdom of Prussia) Prussia
- Branch/service: Prussian Army
- Years of service: 1791–1819
- Rank: General der Infanterie
- Battles/wars: See battles: Napoleonic Wars; War of the Fourth Coalition; Battle of Jena–Auerstedt; Battle of Eylau; Battle of Heilsberg; Peninsular War; Battle of Valencia; Battle of Albuera; Battle of Saguntum; War of the Sixth Coalition; Battle of Lützen; Battle of Bautzen; Battle of Haynau; Battle of Kulm (WIA); Battle of Leipzig; Battle of Paris; Hundred Days; Waterloo Campaign; Battle of Ligny; Battle of Waterloo

Karl Wilhelm Georg von Grolman(n) (30 July 1777 – 1 June 1843) was a Prussian general who fought in the Napoleonic Wars.

== Biography ==
Grolman was born in Berlin. He entered an infantry regiment at the age of thirteen years, was commissioned as an ensign in 1795, a second lieutenant in 1797, a first lieutenant in 1804, and a staff-captain in 1805. While still a subaltern, he had become one of Scharnhorst's intimate friends, and he was distinguished for his energetic and fearless character before the War of 1806. He served as a staff officer from Jena to the Peace of Tilsit and won the rank of major for distinguished service in action. After the downfall of Prussia and the subsequent peace, Grolman was one of the most active as Scharnhorst's assistants in the work of reorganization during 1809. He joined the Tugendbund and endeavoured to take part in Schill's abortive expedition, after which he entered the Austrian service as a major on the general staff.

Thereafter he journeyed to Cádiz to assist the Spanish against Napoleon and he led a corps of volunteers in the defence of that port against Marshal Victor in 1810. He was present at the Battle of Albuera, at Saguntum, and at Valencia, and became a prisoner of war at Valencia. Soon, however, he escaped to Switzerland, and in 1813 he returned to Prussia as a major on the general staff. He served successively under Colonel von Dolffs and General von Kleist as commissioner at the headquarters of the Russian general Barclay de Tolly.

Grolman took part with Kleist in the victory of Kulm and recovered from a severe wound received at that action in time to be present at the Battle of Leipzig. He played a conspicuous part in the campaign of 1814 in France after which he was made a major general. In this rank be was appointed quartermaster-general to Field Marshal Prince Blücher and after his chief and Gneisenau, Grolman had the greatest share in directing the Prussian operations of 1815.

In the decision, on 18 June 1815, to press forward to Wellington's assistance, Grolman actively concurred, and as the troops approached the battlefield, he is said to have overcome the momentary hesitation of the commander-in-chief and the chief of staff; himself giving the order to advance.

After the Peace of 1815, Grolman occupied important positions in the Ministry of War and the General Staff of the new Prussian Army, being dedicated to reforming the latter. His last public services were rendered in Poland as commander-in-chief, and practically as civil administrator of Grand Duchy of Posen, where he did much to promote the extension of German influence. He was promoted general of infantry in 1837 and died on 1 June 1843 at Posen. His two sons became generals in the Prussian army and the Prussian 18th Infantry Regiment bore his name.

General von Grolman supervised and provided much of the material for Damitz's Geschichte des Feldzugs 1815 (Berlin, 1837-1838), and Geschichte des Feldzugs 1814 in Frankreich (Berlin, 1842-1843).

== Family ==
He was the brother of Wilhelm Heinrich von Grolman.
