= 6th Division (German Empire) =

1816-1919 German Army infantry division

6th Division (6. Division); in 1870-71 and from August 2, 1914, 6th Infantry Division (6. Infanterie-Division)
- Active: 1818–1919
- Country: Prussia/Germany
- Branch: Army
- Type: Infantry (in peacetime included cavalry)
- Size: Approx. 15,000
- Part of: III. Army Corps (III. Armeekorps)
- Garrison/HQ: Düsseldorf (1818–20), Torgau (1820–50), Brandenburg (1850–1919)
- Engagements: Second Schleswig War: Dybbøl Austro-Prussian War: Königgrätz; Franco-Prussian War: Mars-la-Tour, Gravelotte, Metz, Orléans, Le Mans World War I: Battle of the Marne, Race to the Sea, Serbian Campaign, Verdun, Somme, Kerensky Offensive, 2nd Aisne, Hundred Days Offensive

Commanders
- Notable commanders: Wilhelm von Krauseneck, Gottlieb Graf von Haeseler, Hans Hartwig von Beseler, Ferdinand von Quast

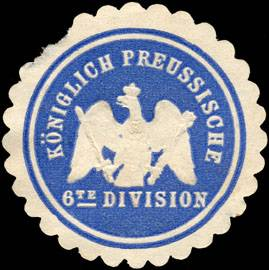
Sealing stamp of the Royal Prussian 6th Division.

The 6th Division (6. Division) was a unit of the Prussian Army. It was formed in Düsseldorf in 1816 as a brigade and became the 6th Division on September 5, 1818. The headquarters moved to Torgau in 1820 and then to Brandenburg in 1850. The division was subordinated in peacetime to the III Army Corps (III. Armeekorps). The division was disbanded in 1919 during the demobilization of the German Army after World War I. The division was recruited in the Province of Brandenburg.

The 6th Division fought in the Second Schleswig War of 1864, including the key Battle of Dybbøl, or Düppeler Heights. The division then fought in the Austro-Prussian War in 1866, including the Battle of Königgrätz. In the Franco-Prussian War of 1870-71, the division saw action in the battles of Mars-la-Tour, Gravelotte, Orléans, and Le Mans, and in the Siege of Metz.

The division was mobilized as the 6th Infantry Division in August 1914 and sent to the west for the opening campaigns of the war. In 1914 it fought in the Battle of the Marne and the Race to the Sea. It then settled into positional warfare in the trenches along the Somme. The division was sent east in late 1915 to participate in the Serbian Campaign. It fought in the early phases of the Battle of Verdun and in the Battle of the Somme in 1916. In mid-1917, it was sent to the Eastern Front in response to the Russian Kerensky Offensive. It returned to the Western Front in September 1917, and remained there until war's end, participating in the Second Battle of the Aisne in 1917 and in the German spring offensive of 1918 and the Allied offensives that followed. The division was rated among the best in the German Army by Allied intelligence.

== Order of battle in the Franco-Prussian War ==
During wartime, the 6th Division, like other regular German divisions, was redesignated an infantry division. The organization of the 6th Infantry Division in 1870 at the beginning of the Franco-Prussian War was as follows:

- 11. Infanterie-Brigade
  - Infanterie-Regiment Nr. 20
  - Infanterie-Regiment Nr. 60
- 12. Infanterie-Brigade
  - Infanterie-Regiment Nr. 24
  - Füsilier-Regiment Nr. 35
- Dragoner-Regiment Nr. 2

== Pre-World War I organization ==
German divisions underwent various organizational changes after the Franco-Prussian War. The organization of the division in 1914, shortly before the outbreak of World War I, was as follows:

- 11. Infanterie-Brigade
  - Infanterie-Regiment Graf Tauentzien von Wittenburg (3. Brandenburgisches) Nr. 20
  - Füsilier-Regiment Prinz Heinrich von Preußen (1. Brandenburgisches) Nr. 35
- 12. Infanterie-Brigade
  - Infanterie-Regiment Großherzog Friedrich Franz II von Mecklenburg-Schwerin (4. Brandenburgisches) Nr. 24
  - Infanterie-Regiment General-Feldmarshchall Prinz Friedrich Karl von Preußen (8. Brandenburgisches) Nr. 64
- 6. Kavallerie-Brigade
  - Kürassier-Regiment Kaiser Nikolas I. von Rußland (Brandenburgisches) Nr. 6
  - Husaren-Regiment von Zieten (Brandenburgisches) Nr. 3
- 6. Feldartillerie-Brigade
  - Feldartillerie-Regiment General-Feldzeugmeister (1. Brandenburgisches) Nr. 3
  - Kurmärkisches Feldartillerie-Regiment Nr. 39

== Order of battle on mobilization ==
On mobilization in August 1914 at the beginning of World War I, most divisional cavalry, including brigade headquarters, was withdrawn to form cavalry divisions or split up among divisions as reconnaissance units. Divisions received engineer companies and other support units from their higher headquarters. The 6th Division was again renamed the 6th Infantry Division. Its initial wartime organization was as follows:

- 11.Infanterie-Brigade:
  - Infanterie-Regiment Graf Tauentzien von Wittenburg (3. Brandenburgisches) Nr. 20
  - Füsilier-Regiment Prinz Heinrich von Preußen (1. Brandenburgisches) Nr. 35
- 12.Infanterie-Brigade:
  - Infanterie-Regiment Großherzog Friedrich Franz II von Mecklenburg-Schwerin (4. Brandenburgisches) Nr. 24
  - Infanterie-Regiment General-Feldmarshchall Prinz Friedrich Karl von Preußen (8. Brandenburgisches) Nr. 64
  - Brandenburgisches Jäger-Bataillon Nr. 3
- "1/2" Husaren-Regiment von Zieten (Brandenburgisches) Nr. 3
- 6.Feldartillerie-Brigade:
  - Feldartillerie-Regiment General-Feldzeugmeister (1. Brandenburgisches) Nr. 3
  - Kurmärkisches Feldartillerie-Regiment Nr. 39
- 2./Pionier-Bataillon von Rauch (1. Brandenburgisches) Nr. 3

== Late World War I organization ==
Divisions underwent many changes during the war, with regiments moving from division to division, and some being destroyed and rebuilt. During the war, most divisions became triangular - one infantry brigade with three infantry regiments rather than two infantry brigades of two regiments (a "square division"). An artillery commander replaced the artillery brigade headquarters, the cavalry was further reduced, the engineer contingent was increased, and a divisional signals command was created. The 6th Infantry Division's order of battle on February 16, 1918, was as follows:

- 12.Infanterie-Brigade:
  - Infanterie-Regiment Großherzog Friedrich Franz II von Mecklenburg-Schwerin (4. Brandenburgisches) Nr. 24
  - Infanterie-Regiment General-Feldmarschall Prinz Friedrich Karl von Preußen (8. Brandenburgisches) Nr. 64
  - Infanterie-Regiment Nr. 396
  - Machinengewehr-Scharfschützen-Abteilung Nr. 69
- 5.Eskadron/Husaren-Regiment von Zieten (Brandenburgisches) Nr. 3
- Artillerie-Kommandeur 64:
  - Feldartillerie-Regiment General-Feldzeugmeister (1. Brandenburgisches) Nr. 3
  - I.Bataillon/Fußartillerie-Regiment General-Feldzeugmeister (Brandenburgisches) Nr. 3
- Stab Pionier-Bataillon von Rauch (1. Brandenburgisches) Nr. 3:
  - 3./Pionier-Bataillon von Rauch (1. Brandenburgisches) Nr. 3
  - 5./Pionier-Bataillon von Rauch (1. Brandenburgisches) Nr. 3
  - Minenwerfer-Kompanie Nr. 6
- Divisions-Nachrichten-Kommandeur 6
