= List of heirs to the Prussian throne =

This is a list of those people who were heir apparent or heir presumptive to the Kingdom of Prussia from its foundation in 1701 to the end of the monarchy in 1918. From 18 January 1871 the Crown Prince of Prussia was also heir apparent to the German Empire. Those heirs who succeeded are shown in bold.

== Heirs to the Kingdom of Prussia ==
King	Heir	Relationship to king and status	Became heir; Reason	Ceased to be heir; Reason	Next in line
Friedrich I	**Crown Prince Friedrich Wilhelm**	Son; Heir apparent	18 January 1701; foundation of the Kingdom of Prussia	25 February 1713; succeeded	Philipp Wilhelm, Margrave of Brandenburg-Schwedt; 1701–1707, uncle
Friedrich I	**Crown Prince Friedrich Wilhelm**	Son; Heir apparent	18 January 1701; foundation of the Kingdom of Prussia	25 February 1713; succeeded	Friedrich Ludwig; 1707-1708, son
Friedrich I	**Crown Prince Friedrich Wilhelm**	Son; Heir apparent	18 January 1701; foundation of the Kingdom of Prussia	25 February 1713; succeeded	Philipp Wilhelm, Margrave of Brandenburg-Schwedt; 1708-1710, uncle
Friedrich I	**Crown Prince Friedrich Wilhelm**	Son; Heir apparent	18 January 1701; foundation of the Kingdom of Prussia	25 February 1713; succeeded	Friedrich Wilhelm; 1710–1711, son
Friedrich I	**Crown Prince Friedrich Wilhelm**	Son; Heir apparent	18 January 1701; foundation of the Kingdom of Prussia	25 February 1713; succeeded	Philipp Wilhelm, Margrave of Brandenburg-Schwedt; 1711, uncle
Friedrich I	**Crown Prince Friedrich Wilhelm**	Son; Heir apparent	18 January 1701; foundation of the Kingdom of Prussia	25 February 1713; succeeded	Friedrich Wilhelm, Margrave of Brandenburg-Schwedt; 1711–1712, first cousin
Friedrich I	**Crown Prince Friedrich Wilhelm**	Son; Heir apparent	18 January 1701; foundation of the Kingdom of Prussia	25 February 1713; succeeded	**Friedrich**; 1712–1713, son
Friedrich Wilhelm I	**Crown Prince Friedrich**	Son; Heir apparent	25 February 1713; father succeeded	31 May 1740; succeeded	Friedrich Wilhelm, Margrave of Brandenburg-Schwedt; 1713–1717, first cousin once removed
Friedrich Wilhelm I	**Crown Prince Friedrich**	Son; Heir apparent	25 February 1713; father succeeded	31 May 1740; succeeded	Prince Ludwig Karl Wilhelm; 1717–1719, brother
Friedrich Wilhelm I	**Crown Prince Friedrich**	Son; Heir apparent	25 February 1713; father succeeded	31 May 1740; succeeded	Friedrich Wilhelm, Margrave of Brandenburg-Schwedt; 1719–1722, first cousin once removed
Friedrich Wilhelm I	**Crown Prince Friedrich**	Son; Heir apparent	25 February 1713; father succeeded	31 May 1740; succeeded	Prince August Wilhelm; 1722–1740
Friedrich II	Prince August Wilhelm	Brother; Heir presumptive	31 May 1740; brother succeeded	12 June 1758; died	Prince Heinrich; 1740–1744, brother
Friedrich II	Prince August Wilhelm	Brother; Heir presumptive	31 May 1740; brother succeeded	12 June 1758; died	**Prince Friedrich Wilhelm**; 1744–1758, son
Friedrich II	**Prince Friedrich Wilhelm**	Nephew; Heir presumptive	12 June 1758; father died	17 August 1786; succeeded	Prince Heinrich; 1758–1767, brother
Friedrich II	**Prince Friedrich Wilhelm**	Nephew; Heir presumptive	12 June 1758; father died	17 August 1786; succeeded	Prince Heinrich; 1767–1770, uncle
Friedrich II	**Prince Friedrich Wilhelm**	Nephew; Heir presumptive	12 June 1758; father died	17 August 1786; succeeded	**Prince Friedrich Wilhelm**; 1770–1786, son
Friedrich Wilhelm II	**Crown Prince Friedrich Wilhelm**	Son; Heir apparent	17 August 1786; father succeeded	16 November 1797; succeeded	Prince Ludwig Karl; 1786–1795, brother
Friedrich Wilhelm II	**Crown Prince Friedrich Wilhelm**	Son; Heir apparent	17 August 1786; father succeeded	16 November 1797; succeeded	**Prince Friedrich Wilhelm**; 1795–1797, son
Friedrich Wilhelm III	**Crown Prince Friedrich Wilhelm**	Son; Heir apparent	16 November 1797; father succeeded	7 June 1840; succeeded	**Prince Wilhelm**, brother
Friedrich Wilhelm IV	**Prince Wilhelm**	Brother; Heir presumptive	7 June 1840; brother succeeded	2 January 1861; succeeded	**Prince Friedrich**, son
Wilhelm I	**Crown Prince Friedrich**	Son; Heir apparent	2 January 1861; father succeeded	18 January 1871; became heir also to the German Empire	**Prince Wilhelm**, son

== Heirs to the German Empire and the Kingdom of Prussia ==
Heir	Status	Relationship to monarch	Became heir		Ceased to be heir		Duration as heir	Next in succession Relation to heir	Monarch
Heir	Status	Relationship to monarch	Date	Reason	Date	Reason	Duration as heir	Next in succession Relation to heir	Monarch
Crown Prince Friedrich	Heir apparent	Eldest son	18 January 1871	Formation of the German Empire	9 March 1888	Became emperor	17 years, 1 month and 20 days	Prince Wilhelm; Son	Wilhelm I
Crown Prince Wilhelm	Heir apparent	Eldest son	9 March 1888	Father became emperor	15 June 1888	Became emperor	3 months and 6 days	Prince Wilhelm; Son	Friedrich III
Crown Prince Wilhelm	Heir apparent	Eldest son	15 June 1888	Father became emperor	9 November 1918	Monarchy abolished	30 years, 4 months and 25 days	Prince Eitel Friedrichl; 1888–1906; Younger brother	Wilhelm II
Crown Prince Wilhelm	Heir apparent	Eldest son	15 June 1888	Father became emperor	9 November 1918	Monarchy abolished	30 years, 4 months and 25 days	Prince Wilhelm; 1906–1918; Son	Wilhelm II
