= List of Marshals of the First French Empire =

Marshals appointed by Napoleon

Marshal of the Empire
- The baton of a Marshal; although often treated as such, Marshal was not a rank, rather, a reward
- Country: First French Empire
- Formation: 1804
- Abolished: 1815

Marshal of the Empire was a civil dignity in the First French Empire between 1804 and 1815. The successor of the dignity, the Marshal of France, is a five-star rank with a NATO code of OF-10, equivalent to an Admiral of France in the French Navy. The distinction was used sporadically and was vacant during parts of its history. A marshal was a grand officer of the Empire, entitled to a high-standing position at the court and to the presidency of an electoral college. In total, Napoleon granted 26 men a marshal's baton.

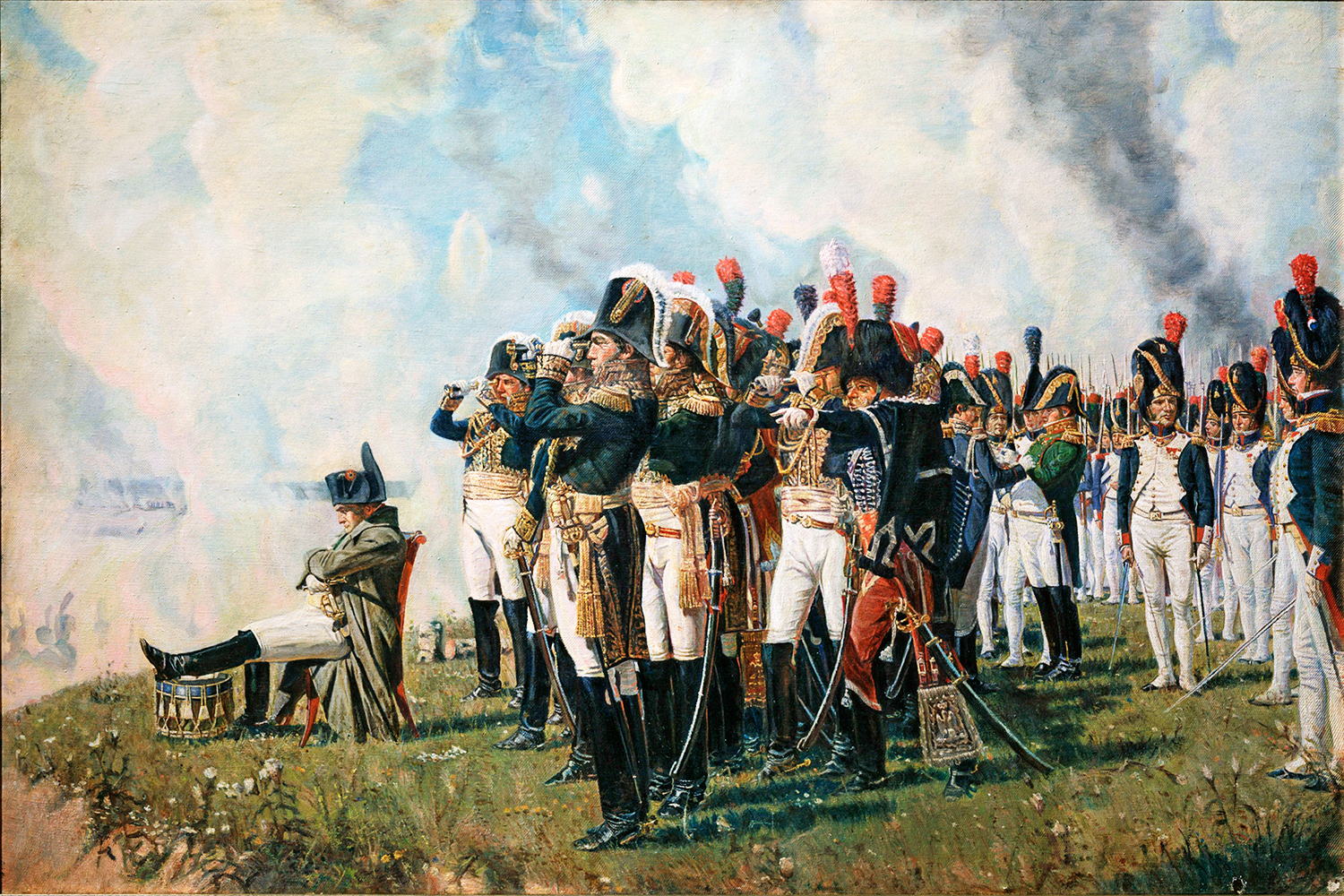
Napoleon near Borodino, an 1897 painting by Vasily Vereshchagin. Several Marshals (recognisable by their white-feathered bicornes) are depicted in the painting.

Unlike many positions, the Marshal of the Empire distinction was not a rank, rather a reward. Almost all officers to hold the position of Marshal were professional soldiers in the French Army. Some, including Józef Poniatowski, served in foreign armies. Of all 26, 5 were killed in action, or by accident. One Marshal was present at the Battle of Vitoria, fought in 1813, where the Duke of Wellington earned the British equivalent of the distinction. Most had defected to the royalists before the Battle of Waterloo and Napoleon's subsequent defeat, with only four (most notably Marshals Emmanuel de Grouchy and Michel Ney) serving under Napoleon at the Battle of Waterloo.

Auguste de Marmont, born in 1774, was the youngest officer to earn the distinction, while Francois Kellerman, born in 1735, was the oldest. The majority (18 out of 26) were given the title in 1804, while Grouchy received the last, in 1815, shortly before the Battle of Waterloo.

== List of Marshals ==
† — Indicates that the Marshal was either killed in action or killed by accident

List of Marshals of the First French Empire
Name	Image	Born	Died	Date of promotion
Louis-Alexandre Berthier†	painting of Louis-Alexandre Berthier	November 20, 1753	June 1, 1815	May 19, 1804
Joachim Murat	painting of Joachim Murat	March 25, 1767	October 13, 1815	May 19, 1804
Bon Adrien Jeannot de Moncey	painting of Bon Adrien Jeannot de Moncey	July 31, 1754	April 20, 1842	May 19, 1804
Jean-Baptiste Jourdan	painting of Jean-Baptiste Jourdan	April 29, 1762	November 23, 1833	May 19, 1804
André Masséna	painting of Andre Massena	May 6, 1758	April 4, 1817	May 19, 1804
Charles-Pierre François Augereau	painting of Charles-Pierre François Augereau	October 21, 1757	June 12, 1816	May 19, 1804
Jean-Baptiste Jules Bernadotte	painting of Jean-Baptiste Jules Bernadotte	January 26, 1763	March 8, 1844	May 19, 1804
Jean-de-Dieu Soult	painting of Jean-de-Dieu Soult	March 29, 1769	November 26, 1851	May 19, 1804
Guillaume Marie-Anne Brune	painting of Guillaume Marie-Anne Brune	May 13, 1763	August 2, 1815	May 19, 1804
Jean Lannes†	painting of Jean Lannes	April 11, 1769	May 31, 1809	May 19, 1804
Édouard Mortier†	painting of Édouard Mortier	February 13, 1768	July 28, 1835	May 19, 1804
Michel Ney	painting of Michel Ney	January 10, 1769	December 7, 1815	May 19, 1804
Louis-Nicolas Davout	painting of Louis-Nicholas Davout	May 10, 1770	June 1, 1823	May 19, 1804
Jean-Baptiste Bessières†	painting of Jean-Baptiste Bessières	August 6, 1768	May 1, 1813	May 19, 1804
François Christophe de Kellermann	painting of Francois Christophe de Kellerman	May 28, 1735	September 13, 1820	May 19, 1804
François Joseph Lefebvre	painting of Francois Joseph Lefebvre	October 25, 1755	September 14, 1820	May 19, 1804
Catherine-Dominique de Pérignon	painting of Catherine-Dominque de Perignon	May 31, 1754	December 25, 1818	May 19, 1804
Jean-Mathieu-Philibert Sérurier	painting of Jean-Mathieu-Philibert Serurier	December 8, 1742	December 21, 1819	May 19, 1804
Claude Victor Perrin	painting of Claude Victor-Perrin	December 7, 1764	March 1, 1841	July 13, 1807
Jacques Étienne Joseph Alexandre Macdonald	painting of Jacques Étienne Joseph Alexandre Macdonald	November 17, 1765	September 25, 1840	July 12, 1809
Nicolas Charles Oudinot	painting of Nicholas Charles Oudinot	April 25, 1767	September 13, 1847	July 12, 1809
Auguste Frédéric de Marmont	painting of Auguste Frédéric de Marmont	July 20, 1774	July 23, 1852	July 12, 1809
Louis-Gabriel Suchet	painting of Louis-Gabriel Suchet	March 2, 1770	January 3, 1826	July 8, 1811
Laurent de Gouvion Saint-Cyr	painting of Laurent de Gouvion Saint-Cyr	April 13, 1764	March 17, 1830	August 27, 1812
Józef Poniatowski†	painting of Józef Poniatowski	May 7, 1762	October 19, 1813	October 17, 1813
Emmanuel de Grouchy	painting of Emmanuel de Grouchy	October 23, 1766	May 29, 1847	April 17, 1815

== See also ==
- Field Marshal (United Kingdom)
