= Zieten Hussars =

Prussian and Imperial German cavalry regiment

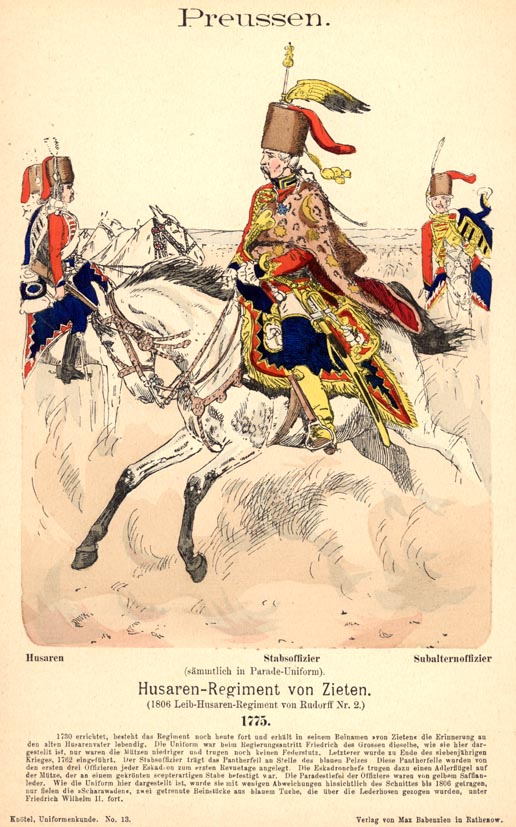
Zieten Hussars in 1775. (Note: On this drawing of Zieten Hussars, Knötel states that "established in 1730, the regiment still exists today (1730 errichtet, besteht das Regiment noch heute fort)" (Knötel, 1890, table 13).)

The Zieten Hussars, (Note: Also known as the Ziethen Hussars (both spellings are used in sources on military history)) (German: Husaren-Regiment "von Zieten"), last designation: "Hussars Regiment 'von Zieten' (Brandenburg) No. 3" (Husaren-Regiment von Zieten (Brandenburgisches) Nr. 3), was a hussar regiment of the Prussian Army. (Note: "This is a colorful set of Imperial German Kettle Drummers just before the beginning of World War One by Schirmer."("Imperial German Kettle Drummers, Kettle Drummer Hussar Regiment von Zieten Nr. 3". uniformology.com. Archived from the original on 2009-08-04.)) founded in 1730 and named after its first Colonel, Hans Joachim von Zieten.

Frederick the Great created it as the 2nd Hussar Regiment (H2), and in 1743 it adopted the distinctive tiger-skin pelisse for their parade uniforms, with company officers wearing fur caps with heron feathers and field officers using an eagles's wing. During the 1806 campaign of the War of the Fourth Coalition, the regiment was known as von Rudorff Hussar regiment, soon renamed Life Hussar Regiment von Rudorff (No.2) (German: No.2 Leib-Husaren von Rudorff).

The regiment capitulated at Ratekau following the defeat of 1806 and was disbanded. In 1807 it formed a squadron in its former depot as Freikorps Marwitz and amalgamated with Blücher's Corps to create the 1st Brandenburg Hussar Regiment on 7 September 1808 (Husaren Regiment Nr.3). The regiment's 2nd squadron served during the Russian Campaign of 1812 on the French side, and the regiment served throughout the 1813-1814 campaigns on the Coalition side, also participating in the 1815 campaign.

In 1860, before the unification of Germany, the regiment became a part of the Federal Army. But it took until 1861 to officially recognize the regimental tradition of the old Prussian 2nd Hussar Regiment. Shortly before the outbreak of World War I it formed part of the 6th Cavalry-Brigade in the 6th Division (Brandenburg Division) known as Husaren-Regiment von Zieten (Brandenburgisches) Nr. 3 ("Hussars Regiment "von Zieten" (Brandenburgian) No. 3") and was stationed in Rathenow; on mobilisation, the cavalry brigades were re-organised into independent divisions; the regiment remained as divisional cavalry, split between the 5th Division and the 6th Division.

== See also ==
- List of Imperial German cavalry regiments

== Notes ==
Footnotes

Citations
