= Wilhelm Heinrich von Grolman =

German jurist (1781–1856)

Wilhelm Heinrich von Grolman(n) (28 February 1781 – 1 January 1856) was a German jurist, president of the Prussian Kammergericht (Court of Appeals), and Wirklicher Geheimer Rat (Real Privy Councilor).

== Biography ==
Born in Berlin, Brandenburg, Grolman was the brother of the general Karl von Grolman. After studying law in Göttingen and Halle, he became an Auskultator at the city court of Berlin in 1801, Referendar at the district or provincial court in 1802, and Assessor at Marienwerder in 1804. Grolman was appointed government councilor in 1806, councilor of the Berlin Kammergericht in 1808, and member of the Brandenburg Pupillenkollegium in 1810.

When Prussia entered the Sixth Coalition in 1813, Grolman served as a Major and commanded a Brandenburg Landwehr battalion. He participated in the Battle of Hagelberg and the blockades of Magdeburg and Wesel. In July 1814 Grolman returned to his magistracy, but took command of his Landwehr battalion the following year during the Hundred Days. For his leadership at Fleurus and Wavre he was awarded the Iron Cross 1st Class.

Grolman returned to his legal career in 1816 and was named vice president of the Kleve Oberlandesgericht. In 1819 he participated in a Berlin ministry to reform the Prussian legislature, and, after its dissolution, was appointed vice president of the Oberlandesgericht of Magdeburg in 1821. Grolman became vice president of the Berlin Kammergericht in 1827, president of the Justruktionssenat in 1831 and the Oberappellationssenat in 1836, and a member of the privy council in 1840. He resigned in 1845.

Grolman was awarded with the Order of the Red Eagle. His first marriage was to a daughter of the Berlin doctor Ernst Ludwig Heim. His descendants include General Helmuth von Grolman (1898-1977), the first Wehrbeauftragter des Deutschen Bundestages (Ombudsman for the Military) of West Germany.

His grave is preserved in the Protestant Friedhof II der Jerusalems- und Neuen Kirchengemeinde (Cemetery No. II of the congregations of Jerusalem's Church and New Church) in Berlin-Kreuzberg, south of Hallesches Tor.
