= August Otto Rühle von Lilienstern =

Prussian army officer (1780–1847)

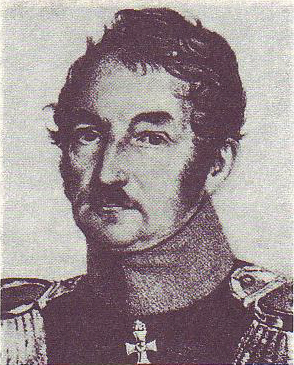
- Born: April 16, 1780; Berlin, Prussia
- Died: July 1, 1847 (aged 67); Salzburg, Austrian Empire
- Military career
- Allegiance: Prussia
- Branch: Prussian Army
- Conflicts: Napoleonic Wars

August Otto Rühle von Lilienstern, born 1780, died 1847. Prussian officer, joined Scharnhorst's Academy for Officers in the same class as Carl von Clausewitz. Later, they both taught at the Prussian General War School, which would become the Prussian War Academy, and Rühle became Clausewitz' second successor as its director. Rühle published many articles, kept official war diaries, and wrote a two-volume Manual for the Officer for Education in Peace and for Use in Action (Handbuch für den Offizier zur Belehrung im Frieden und zum Gebrauch im Felde), published in Berlin in 1817 and 1818. Lilienstern and Clausewitz, teaching at the same school at the time of publication of this manual, were in agreement on many points. For example, they agreed that war was political in nature (which was neither a novel nor a controversial idea) and that war was a Zweikampf. (That is, literally a "two-struggle," usually translated into English as "duel," though in fact the imagery and metaphor that Clausewitz pursued was a wrestling match.) Clausewitz made these ideas famous in his book On War. Their common views on such issues can be traced to the nature of the military intellectual community in Prussia and the common influence of Gerhard von Scharnhorst.

Lilienstern was a close friend of the landscape painter Caspar David Friedrich and his writing contributed to modern research of the artist.
